= Family Guy season 20 =

Season of television series

Family Guy
- Season 20
- Digital purchase image
- Showrunners: Richard Appel; Alec Sulkin
- Starring: Seth MacFarlane; Alex Borstein; Seth Green; Mila Kunis; Mike Henry; Patrick Warburton; Arif Zahir
- No. of episodes: 20

Release
- Original network: Fox
- Original release: September 26, 2021 – May 22, 2022

Season chronology
- ← Previous; Season 19 Next → Season 21

The twentieth season of Family Guy aired on Fox from September 26, 2021, to May 22, 2022. The twentieth season aired as a part of the show's 20th anniversary.

The series follows the dysfunctional Griffin family, consisting of father Peter, mother Lois, daughter Meg, son Chris, baby Stewie, and the family dog Brian, who reside in their hometown of Quahog.

During this season, the Griffin men spend a day with Stewie's rival Doug (LASIK Instinct), Peter has a secret meal affair with Bonnie (Cootie & The Blowhard), the Griffins must cover the death of a pizza delivery man and deliver pizzas to the rest of Quahog (The Lois Quagmire), Lois and Carter attend the funeral of Lois' old babysitter (Peterschmidt Manor), Meg becomes a getaway driver and dates a robber (Hard Boiled Meg), Stewie helps Chris put on a school play for Romeo + Juliet (The Jersey Bore), and Peter and Chris go on a road trip to Canada to prove the existence of Chris' girlfriend (Girlfriend, Eh?). This season also featured a cameo from Mike Judge, who reprised his role as Hank Hill from the American television series King of the Hill, who previously cameoed in Season 18 as Beavis and Butt-Head.

Season twenty premiered the run of the nineteenth production season, which is executive produced by Seth MacFarlane, Alec Sulkin, Richard Appel, Steve Callaghan, Danny Smith, Kara Vallow, Mark Hentemann, Tom Devanney, and Patrick Meighan. Sulkin and Appel returned as the series' showrunners.

The season premiered on ITV2 (UK) on Monday 8 August 2022.

== Voice cast and characters ==
- Seth MacFarlane as Peter Griffin, Brian Griffin, Stewie Griffin, Glenn Quagmire, Tom Tucker, Carter Pewterschmidt, Dr. Elmer Hartman, Seamus Levine.
- Alex Borstein as Lois Griffin, Elle Hitler
- Seth Green as Chris Griffin
- Mila Kunis as Meg Griffin
- Mike Henry as John Herbert, Bruce
- Patrick Warburton as Joe Swanson
- Arif Zahir as Cleveland Brown

=== Supporting characters ===
- Gary Cole as Principal Shepard
- Sam Elliott as Mayor Wild West
- Mark Hentemann as Opie
- Sanaa Lathan as Donna Tubbs-Brown
- Peter Macon as Preston Lloyd
- Marlee Matlin as Stella
- Rachael MacFarlane as Miss Tammy
- Chris Parnell as Doug
- Jay Pharoah as Brick Baker
- Jennifer Tilly as Bonnie Swanson

== Episodes ==
No. overall	No. in season	Title	Directed by	Written by	Original release date	Prod. code	U.S. viewers (millions)
370	1	"LASIK Instinct"	Steve Robertson	Kirker Butler	September 26, 2021	LACX02	1.56
Lois accidentally hits Doug with her car while dropping Stewie off at daycare. Doug's parents state in order to prevent them from pressing charges, Lois has to build Doug a tree house and go get her eyes checked, and she agrees to have the boys build it while she goes to the doctor to check out her vision. Dr. Hartman convinces Lois to get LASIK to correct her vision. However, the surgery is botched thanks to Dr. Hartman's cat, so she is rendered blind. Lois feels unseen as a result, so Meg, who feels unseen all the time, advises her mother to vent online, which is the only normal technique that makes her feel better. Lois becomes an internet celebrity as she starts the ICU program and exploits her condition for financial gain, but is surprised to discover her sight has come back. She attempts to keep the charade going until she accidentally outs herself on The Helen Disingenuous Show upon Reese Witherspoon bringing out a giant check, where she owns up to her mistakes. Meanwhile, after building Doug's tree house, the male Griffins are tasked to keep spending time with Doug in order to avoid a lawsuit by his father. Eventually, a fed up Stewie tells Doug they would rather be sued, since Peter basically has nothing, seeing as he drove Brian's car there. Stewie tries to call Doug's father to end the deal, but learns he was just faking the extra demands to make up for his father's neglect, and actually enjoyed their time together. Doug's dad arrives only to get his phone from Doug and immediately leaves to be with his mistress. While Brian and Chris plan to poop in the shoes of Doug's father, Stewie agrees to be friends with him in private as long as they remain rivals in public. Note: This is the first episode where Cleveland is voiced by Arif Zahir.
371	2	"Rock Hard"	Greg Colton	Matt McElaney	October 3, 2021	KACX20	1.28
While at an old record store, Peter and the guys recount tales of three rock legends: Peter imagines himself as Jim Morrison, who founds The Doors alongside Ray Manzarek, but various personal issues start to affect his music career, culminating in his death via a heroin overdose.; Spoofing Green Book, Jerome imagines himself as Muddy Waters (referred to as "Muddy Drawers"), who sells his soul to the devil in order to better his musical ability. His music career ends up in ruins when his new Italian American friend steals his songs, revealing himself to be Elvis Presley, and gets famous without giving him credit, leaving Muddy stuck in obscurity.; Stewie envisions himself as Elton John, who is pushed by his parents to become a gay musician. He then faces stress from his manager and drugs and manages to become a music icon. After winding up in the hospital, Elton wants him and his songwriting partner Bernie Taupin (played by Brian) to do a "what do they look like now" credits montage, only for him to be upset at how he ends up looking, then the two switch over to roasting Sean Hannity (a callback to a joke from the 17th season's finale).; After the stories, Peter states they should remember the four member band from the 60's who changed music forever. Quagmire thinks Peter is referring to The Beatles, but Peter says he was referring to The Trashmen, proceeding into a clip of "Surfin' Bird" with Peter, Cleveland, Joe and Quagmire as the band. Note: This episode was dedicated to Norm MacDonald, the original voice of Death, who had died the previous month from acute leukemia. However, the dedication is cut out from streaming versions.
372	3	"Must Love Dogs"	Mike Kim	Daniel Peck	October 10, 2021	KACX18	1.67
On Halloween night, Quagmire meets a woman named Carrie taking her niece trick or treating and the two hit it off. On a subsequent date, she reveals that she is an avid dog lover. Quagmire is shocked at this, but lies about loving dogs as well in order to keep the relationship going, and asks Brian to pose as his dog. Brian agrees, but only so he can see the relationship fail; he ups the ante by making Carrie think Quagmire proposed, and she accepts. Once she moves in, Quagmire is horrified at how her many dogs are ruining his life and he reaches his wits' end at the engagement party as a party guest (Haley Tju) compliments the dogs. After getting trampled by her dogs due to him saying walk in his engagement speech, he reveals that he actually hates dogs and that he recruited Brian to help out. Carrie breaks up with him, not because of his tastes, but because he lied to her. Quagmire admits that Brian was right, but vows revenge on him for ruining the relationship. Meanwhile, Stewie discovers that half of his Halloween candy was stolen, and Chris tells him it was Peter who did the same to Chris when he was young and offers to help Stewie. Chris advises his brother to hide it in the backyard, but Stewie later finds that the rest of his candy was stolen and expresses great grief. Unbeknownst to him, Chris was working with Peter to rob Stewie.
373	4	"80's Guy"	John Holmquist	Patrick Meighan	October 17, 2021	LACX01	1.37
Peter gives Chris some 1980s movies so he can learn how to impress a girl. When this gets Chris in trouble upon him being brought home by Joe, Peter is chastised for referencing his favorite decade, as a lot of the values espoused by its entertainment have not aged well. Undeterred, Peter attempts to prove to the family the 80s are still good, but is convinced otherwise after killing the Caddyshack gopher. Peter then tries to find other decades to explore, much to Lois' consternation. Peter is heartbroken at the fact that the 80s are no longer good and tries to commit suicide, but the Ghost of John Hughes tells him the 80s were simply a time of trying new things and convinces Peter to move on. Meanwhile, Stewie is sick of Doug upstaging him, so he volunteers to retrieve a frisbee that landed at the top of the jungle gym, which Doug says is a death trap to kids. The next day, Stewie is prepared to climb, but is surprised when Doug plans to do it as well. The two race to the top, and although Stewie wins, his foot gets stuck. Doug offers to help him out, and the two have a heart-to-heart about their rivalry. Stewie gives Doug the frisbee, but learns their bonding was a ploy to get the frisbee and hog the glory, but Stewie frees himself and catches up. They both fall to the ground, but realize they were not as high up as they thought. They share the credit for retrieving the frisbee, only to find that the kids who watched them climb the jungle gym have all left and replaced with other kids who say what they did meant nothing to them. The boys assure they are now friends. A movie is soon made about their adventure as Stewie sees the trailer. While he voices his opinion on Chris Pine portraying Doug and Paul Giamatti portraying him, Stewie gives it a shot when Chris Hemsworth portrays Stewie's thought girl.
374	5	"Brief Encounter"	Brian Iles	Travis Bowe	October 24, 2021	KACX19	1.38
Peter and the guys discover Duds & Suds, a laundromat that sells beer, and decide to wash their clothes there, while also describing which brands of underwear they use. However, Peter and Quagmire end up switching briefs by mistake, and start acting like each other. Quagmire uses Peter's laugh, makes immature jokes, becomes obsessed with "Surfin' Bird" and has an unseen fight with Ernie the Giant Chicken; all the while Peter uses Quagmire's catchphrases, has excessive sex with Lois, and treats Brian with contempt. Joe eventually deduces that Peter and Quagmire swapped briefs. Even after they switch back, the two still feel awkward and figure that such an event destroys their masculinity and that they cannot be friends anymore. However, after Lois explains how it should not kill a friendship, Peter and Quagmire reconcile. Meanwhile, Stewie wants to get rid of Chi Chi, a stuffed monkey that Lois gives him, since his presence complicates his relationship with Rupert. When Doug confesses to having a similar issue with Miss Tiggywinkles, the two agree to commit each other's murders. Doug "kills" Chi Chi by pushing him off a bookshelf, but Stewie is hesitant to kill Tiggywinkles upon finding that she is a real cat. Doug bribes Stewie with the chance to hang with Doug's kindergarten friends. Stewie bribes Brian into killing Tiggywinkles, but this attempt fails too when Tiggywinkles beats up Brian. Eventually, Tiggywinkles is either killed by Doug or died of natural causes. Either way, Doug prepares to send a photo of Stewie holding the cat. Stewie chases after Doug which gets interrupted when Doug's bully Tyler (Patton Oswalt) drives up and insults Doug. Doug mentions to Stewie that Tyler's "Doug" is his drunken stepfather.
375	6	"Cootie & The Blowhard"	Jerry Langford	Maggie Mull	November 7, 2021	LACX03	1.57
Stewie learns that he has cooties after sharing the Play-Doh with a girl in his class. Doug, who is playing doctor, backs up her claim and states that he is terminal. Stewie makes several attempts to become at peace with his death and raise awareness of his disease, but Brian will not take him seriously. He eventually heads to Burlington to get put down, but Brian talks him out of it by stating that he should just feel lucky to be alive and value whatever time he has left, even going so far as to eat the "tainted" Play-Doh in solidarity. Meanwhile, Joe goes away on a stakeout after Brian's tenth birthday party. When Peter tries to find him at his house, Bonnie invites him to stay for dinner where he becomes addicted to her cooking and is unable to enjoy what Lois makes. Although he continues to eat behind his family's back, Peter has trouble keeping what happened at the Swansons' a secret, viewing it as an affair of sorts. He eventually comes clean only to find that Lois does not care about what he did as it makes things easier for her, but does feel a bit hurt by it.
376	7	"Peterschmidt Manor"	Joseph Lee	Matt Pabian	November 14, 2021	LACX04	1.11
Peter buys a new pitching machine and becomes obsessed with it. When he attempts to use it to unclog a toilet, he ends up flooding the house, forcing the Griffins to live at Pewterschmidt Manor for the time being. Carter needs them to stay so he can attend the funeral of Lois' childhood nanny Meredith who abruptly quit while she was still young. While Lois heads off to the funeral with Carter, the others turn the manor into a hotel. Amidst all the shenanigans, Stewie and Brian attempt to set up Elle Hitler with Dr. Hartman, but ends up causing a love triangle between them and Principal Shepherd. When Elle chooses Hartman because he has money, Stewie ties up loose ends by tripping Hartman's mother into Shepherd's arms. Meanwhile, Lois and Carter make the drive to the funeral home three states over. Through Meredith's intermittently blind sister Jacqueline, Lois learns that Meredith was actually fired by Carter after Babs learned the two had an affair. Lois is furious at her father for ruining her childhood and ridding her of the one person who was there for her. While refusing to speak to him after the funeral, she falls asleep on the drive home as Carter calls in a favor from someone who he previously picked up from LAX. Arriving home, Carter shows Lois a man-made lake near his house where Lois can hang out whenever she misses Meredith.
377	8	"The Birthday Bootlegger"	Julius Wu	Mark Hentemann	November 21, 2021	LACX05	1.68
Peter is put in charge of extravagant monthly celebrations at the brewery in order to celebrate office birthdays including the musical number "June is Busting Out All Over" with Leslie Uggams, but these are soon quelled by the new manager Preston Lloyd (Peter Macon) who favors productivity above all else. Peter retaliates by throwing speakeasy-type secret parties inside an overlooked conference room. During one celebration, he borrows Marty McFly's amp and the noise gives him away due to it being near Preston's office where the sound knocks everything off his wall. This causes Preston to fire him. When Peter shows up at the office to collect his belongings, Opie, Stella, and the other workers show solidarity with him. This convinces Preston to rehire him, figuring that the employees might be more willing to work if they get to party each month. Meanwhile, Stewie pulls a prank on Doug and gives him a nosebleed, earning him his third strike and thus a one-day detention at the elementary school which Miss Tammy takes him to across the street. He views this as actual prison and comes out a ruffian, taking his anger out on his family. He tortures Chris by forcing him to watch a kiddie cartoon and threatens Rupert over not visiting him during detention. Lois manages to calm him down with a bubble bath, although he still has a back tattoo from the experience much to Brian's surprise.
378	9	"The Fatman Always Rings Twice"	Joe Vaux	Alex Carter	November 28, 2021	LACX06	1.45
In a 1940s film noir version of Quahog, Mac Bookpro (Peter Griffin) is a "Private Dick", who has just solved a case involving the unfaithful wife of Seamus. Soon after, he is greeted by Heddy Toothbrace (Lois Griffin), who asks him to investigate the case of her missing daughter, Sister Megan (Meg Griffin). Mac searches various places and starts to suspect Cardinal St. Louis (Carter Pewterschmidt), but after almost getting assaulted by Bogey (Mort Goldman) and Bacaw (Ernie the Giant Chicken), he soon hears about Megan's murder by gunshot. He discovers a roll of film in her remains. While the film is developing, he takes Heddy on a date. The pictures reveal that Heddy and the Cardinal are in cahoots with the mob, which is backed up by lesser mob member Karol (Chris Griffin), who discloses his underground alcohol business and his plans to corner the market. Mac heads to the church to confront the Cardinal, only to find him stabbed to death. Officer Ace Hardware (portrayed by Joe Swanson) shows up, stating that the bullet found in Megan matches the ones found in Mac's gun, and the murder turns out to be a setup to frame Mac and get him locked up. Mac is bailed out by newspaper reporter Red Weiner (Brian Griffin) and pursues Heddy to the harbor, where she reveals that she is innocent and was only fleeing the town for her own safety. Mac's cross-dressing secretary Fanny Patbottom (Stewie Griffin) reveals himself to be one of Megan's former orphans, whom she abused while the Cardinal was too busy with his bootlegging. Plotting revenge on everyone who did him wrong, he prepares to kill Mac with his own gun, but is knocked out by Seamus and arrested by Hardware and the police. With the case closed, Mac and Heddy prepare to marry in Hawaii, while Fanny is taken to the asylum to be lobotomized and castrated.
379	10	"Christmas Crime"	Mike Kim	Steve Callaghan	December 19, 2021	LACX07	1.53
There is a commercial about Happy Asking Panda which is a toy that has flashing eyes after getting data like collecting passwords and banking information. The Griffins gear up for Christmas as they witness Mayor Wild West unveiling a nativity scene he carved himself, but Brian is feeling cynical about the holiday, mainly because of its emphasis on commercialism. After a few too many drinks at the Drunken Clam, he accidentally rams his car into the nativity scene and hides the evidence by parking it among the other clunkers in the Spirit Airlines parking lot. West begins to question everyone in Quahog about the disappearance of his art, briefly hiring Brian to try and sniff out evidence, but eventually decides to cancel Christmas until the culprit is found, much to the family's disappointment. While picking up his aunt at the airport and getting tipped off by Stewie who wanted a Happy Asking Panda toy, West discovers an imprint of baby Jesus' head in the hood of Brian's car and has him arrested. From his cell at the Quahog Police Department, Brian sees how happy everyone is on Christmas, including Stewie who got his Happy Asking Panda, and discovers that the holiday is not just about commercialism, but also family. West has Brian released from his cell, explaining that it was all a ruse to help him learn the true meaning of Christmas. As Stewie uses the Happy Asking Panda's features, its factory in China is revealed to be using its Happy Asking Panda toy to seize American assets by collecting banking information. The head of the factory learns from one of his workers that they found $17.00 in the Griffin family account, which is not enough to cover the $23.00 used to make it, leading to the factory's collapse. Note: This episode was made available on Hulu several hours before its airing.
380	11	"Mister Act"	Brian Iles	Artie Johann	January 9, 2022	LACX08	1.39
For Valentine's Day, Peter buys Lois a stationary bike known as a "Pedalton" after hearing about it during the second hour of The Today Show. Lois quickly becomes addicted to riding it, gaining a buff, athletic physique out of it. Peter is encouraged to try the bike as well, but injures his testicles, resulting in a higher pitched voice. While at church, the pastor makes note of this and has him join the choir, although the choir boys are not pleased with him overshadowing them. Peter recruits Jesus Christ to help him fight back, who trains him in a similar vein to The Karate Kid. He wins, but a crucifix falls on him enough to revert his voice to normal. Meanwhile, Stewie finds himself aroused by Lois' new body and misconstrues all of her gestures as flirting, especially during a "Mommy & Me" class, after which she lets him sleep in her bed the following night. When Stewie tries to replicate the "romantic" evening, however, he learns that his mother's body has returned to normal, due to her quitting after three days upon realizing how masculine her body was turning out. Lois later does a PSA on neglected exercising equipment. Note: This episode was dedicated to series editor Kirk Benson.
381	12	"The Lois Quagmire"	Greg Colton	Evan Waite	February 27, 2022	LACX09	1.26
Lois is invited to her fancy high school reunion. Out of fear of Peter embarrassing her, she asks Quagmire to pose as her husband at the event. Quagmire manages to impress her former schoolmates, upstaging Lois in the process and leaving her feeling left out. Lois later explains to Quagmire that she wanted him to make a move on her so she could turn him down and feel better about herself, but Quagmire says that he was keeping his distance out of respect for her, and that she should have brought Peter along if she wanted that kind of attention. Meanwhile, against Lois' wishes for them to eat healthy food, the other Griffins order pizza only for the delivery man to die of a heart attack on their toilet. They decide to conceal his death by carrying out the rest of his deliveries, having Meg wear his corpse as a disguise, and later decide to push the dead pizza delivery man into the sewers only for Lois to return home and figure out what happened. She is too happy to see Peter to care and apologizes for not inviting him to her reunion, though Peter is pleased that he did not have to come.
382	13	"Lawyer Guy"	John Holmquist	Patrick Meighan	March 6, 2022	LACX10	1.31
Peter orders a hammock from a Corona commercial to put in the backyard, but is unable to relax due to his new backyard neighbor's sprinkler. He hires a local lawyer named Brick Baker (Jay Pharoah) to sue his neighbor, but upon arrival in court, he discovers that the neighbor and the lawyer are one and the same. Peter barely wins due to testimony from his friends which they presented to the judge (Wendie Malick); Brick retaliates by sending them to a "Surfin' Bird" musical, stealing them from Peter. After a failed attempt at replicating his bar talk with his family, Peter demands his friends come back to him, and Brick relents, as they could not stop talking about Peter in his absence. Meanwhile, Stewie takes Brian to a lobster roll truck after the latter craves one, but due to the long line, they decide to catch some lobsters themselves. Their boat ends up getting rocked by a storm, sending Rupert into the inky depths of the ocean. After failing to rescue him on their first try, Stewie goes alone, only to pass out on the ocean floor, but is saved by Brian.
383	14	"HBO-No"	Steve Robertson	Travis Bowe	March 13, 2022	LACX11	1.03
After Peter's uncle passes away, the Griffins decide to use his HBO Max account until his credit card expires. The family turns on the TV, airing three Family Guy parodies of HBO shows: In a spoof of Game of Thrones, Stewie is declared the new heir to the throne, until Peter shows up to take up the crown instead. After the White Walkers invade, John is the only one to survive the war and becomes king.; Parodying Succession, Peter attempts to choose which family member will take ownership of his corporation after he dies despite repeatedly claiming he has decades ahead of him. Though none of his kids make the cut, he gives the company to Gwendoline Christie at the last second as she noted that she was late for the Game of Thrones sketch.; A gender-swapped version of Big Little Lies airs next with Peter, Joe, Quagmire, and Cleveland meeting Chris for the first time where Chris' son is accused of attacking another student. In addition, they must also solves the mystery of who defecated at the bottom of the school staircase.; At the end, only Peter seems to be amused by what they just watched. He is soon shocked to learn from Chris that the three shows they plagiarized have a combined 114 Emmys while Family Guy has none as "Frolic" plays in the background. Note: This episode aired on Hulu hours ahead of its premiere on Fox.
384	15	"Hard Boiled Meg"	Jerry Langford	Mike Desilets	March 20, 2022	LACX12	1.14
While at the bowling alley, Meg crushes on a man named Seymour (Zachary Levi) and offers to drive him home. She quickly discovers that he is a criminal, but gets a rush out of being his getaway driver. Meanwhile, Peter, Quagmire, Cleveland, and Joe go to a virtual reality center called Virtual Reality World. After the experience, Quagmire comes down with a stubborn case of the hiccups which his friends are unable to cure even with assistance from Dr. Hartman and Reverend Lucius (Jay Pharaoh), leaving him sleep-deprived and miserable. Eventually, he begs Peter to kill him, but is unable to talk him out of it after a scratch from Quagmire's cat Principessa cures his hiccups. After a few heists, Seymour plots to rob Ross Dress For Less, a plan that is overheard by a concerned Chris. After the heist, Seymour attempts to profess his love for Meg, but is shot by the police. Peter is driving Quagmire's car, with Quagmire locked in the trunk, while Meg is driving Seymour in Peter's car. Both cars crash into each other, allowing Quagmire to escape, and Meg sees that Seymour is not in Peter's car. Chris explains to Meg that Seymour was just a figment of her imagination, and insists on taking the fall for his sister so that she does not get into trouble. Tom Tucker later reveals that the hallucination was due to E. coli in the mustard packets that Meg was slurping. In a twist ending, the whole episode is revealed to just be a VR simulation of the show that Seymour was partaking in at Virtual Reality World, which he enjoyed. He then decides to try out the Bob's Burgers simulation next.
385	16	"Prescription Heroine"	Joseph Lee	Emily Towers	March 27, 2022	LACX13	1.13
Brian breaks his arm on his way to the door to bark at the delivery man. Lois soon becomes addicted to the painkillers he is prescribed, but cannot get her next fix after Brian finishes the bottle. She makes several attempts to nab more drugs. After one attempt almost results in Lois drowning Stewie, Brian intervenes by locking her inside his crate until she can sober up. Following one last hallucination, Lois decides to quit drugs and but plays some psychedelic music to recapture the calm she got from her high. Meanwhile, Peter prepares to throw away his old ping-pong table before Cleveland offers to take it and repairs it instead. The table quickly becomes a hit among the neighbors, but this leaves Peter annoyed and jealous. After Brick Baker states that he cannot simply take the table back, Peter and Cleveland have a match to decide who keeps it, but end up breaking it in the process. Cleveland is relieved and admits that after 5 days, he got tired of playing ping-pong and having people at his house.
386	17	"All About Alana"	Joe Vaux	Danny Smith	May 1, 2022	LACX15	1.05
One of Lois' top students, Alana Fitzgerald (Elizabeth Gillies), is struggling to afford tuition for the Juilliard School, so Lois offers to let her move in and work for the Griffins in order to earn the money. Alana excels at her chores and gets on almost everyone's good graces, but Lois is suspicious that she is after something more. After Brian tries and fails to confront her, Lois gives Alana the money early so she can leave. Alana uses it to pay some thugs to abduct and murder Lois in the Stop & Shop parking lot and toss her body off a cliff, enabling Alana to live her life in her place while changing her look to resemble Lois. Alana even arranges for Peter to marry her, only for an alive Lois to crash into the chapel where the wedding is held as it is below the cliff. Alana reveals that she was just envious of Lois' life and the way Peter loves her. After Alana is arrested by Joe, Lois later visits her in jail where Alana apologizes for what she did. Lois unsuccessfully begs to swap places with her again after learning what type of amenities the prison provides as she is dragged away by a prison guard while Alana goes back to her cell.
387	18	"Girlfriend, Eh?"	Julius Wu	Travis Bowe	May 8, 2022	LACX14	1.11
Returning home from Camp Washington Football Team, Chris reveals that he has a girlfriend named Jennifaire and uses his new status to provide Peter with unwanted relationship advice. At Quagmire's suggestion, Peter takes Chris on a road trip to Canada, to prove that his girlfriend really exists. Peter makes several attempts to prove his son is lying, but lets it slip that he does not believe he could get a girlfriend because he is a fat loser. Chris is hurt by this. Peter and Chris later make up when Peter confesses that he was a fat loser who once faked a relationship in high school. Upon arrival at Jennifaire's house, Chris tells Peter he made her up and secretly texts her asking to hide their relationship in solidarity with his father; Jennifaire is understanding as she states that she is ashamed of her father, Nickelback. Meanwhile, Stewie breaks a hole in his bedroom wall to a Bizarro World version of Quahog via a treadmill accident following an unseen insult from Doug, so Lois calls over a handyman named Jamie (Justin Hartley), whom both she and Meg end up smitten with. They make several attempts to spoil him while also trying to sabotage each other, but their antics eventually result in Jamie getting flung onto some powerlines that electrocute him and then getting hit by a car. At the funeral, Lois meets his identical twin (also Justin Hartley) only to learn that he does not live in Quahog much to Lois and Meg's dismay as Stewie stows away in his luggage.
388	19	"First Blood"	Mike Kim	Alex Carter	May 15, 2022	LACX16	1.09
After using the slip 'n' slide at a block party, Stewie discovers some blood in his trunks and suspects that he is getting his period. Brian is convinced that the blood is due to him hurting himself on a bump in the slide, but Stewie does not budge until he discovers that he is not bleeding the next day. Learning what spotting is, Stewie assumes that he and Rupert are pregnant. Brian fails to snap him out of it again, but after faking an abortion, Stewie reveals that he knew he was not pregnant all along. Meanwhile, Peter and the guys feel more tired than usual, so Mayor Wild West offers them a weekend at his dude ranch to get their mojo back. He trains them to become cowboys, making them do a cattle run without his help, but a bear attacks them and steals Peter's hat. The guys decide to get back at the bear for the sake of their manhood. They subdue the bear who turns out to be Mayor West in the bear suit the whole time in order to test them. In the end, Lois attends a female version of the dude ranch alongside Bonnie and Donna only to find the activities mundane. When Lois states that she liked the male version of it better, Mayor West states that he liked the original version of Ghostbusters better.
389	20	"The Jersey Bore"	Brian Iles	Chris Regan	May 22, 2022	LACX17	1.13
Preston heads off on a business trip to Atlantic City to meet up with their distributor and decides to bring Peter with him, since he is the least productive worker as Preston's substitute Dan plays Ratatouille to the other workers. Although Peter is hesitant, his friends convince him that business trips can be fun because of the free time outside of the meetings, so he decides to smuggle them along without his boss knowing. Peter tries to visit a bar with the guys during Preston's power nap, but is caught in the act. He convinces Preston to live a little by having him break his sobriety, but this results in a drunken shenanigan-filled night. The next morning, Peter and the guys are unable to find Preston, giving Peter no choice but to deliver the presentation himself. Breaking from the script, he gives a speech about the wonders of beer which wins over the executives. Preston is revealed to be perfectly fine, having found his first sip disgusting and spent the day watching trains, and is proud of Peter for proving how productive he can be. They go to the docks and see the floating corpses. Meanwhile, Chris bumps into the new girl, Heather, and learns through her that the school theater is doing a production of Baz Luhrmann's Romeo + Juliet sponsored by "Ruth's Chris Steakhouses". Knowing that she has been cast as Juliet, he decides to audition for the part of Romeo. Stewie helps him land the role with his coaching, but ends up fighting with Principal Shepherd over the direction of the play and eventually has to handle it himself. Though his strict direction causes Heather to quit, it does bring out Chris' raw emotions which is exactly as Stewie planned. In the final scene, the Romeo + Juliet play is a success with Chris nailing the role and Stewie playing Juliet. Principal Shepherd even makes a positive comment on the play.

== Production ==
On September 23, 2020, Fox announced that Family Guy had been renewed for a twentieth and twenty-first season, ensuring that the series would last another two years.

This season also marks the first full season of the series in which Cleveland Brown is voiced by Arif Zahir, following Mike Henry's departure from the role. Henry continues to voice Herbert and other characters. Before the premiere, Henry sent a video on Twitter saying that he was "handing the torch" onto Zahir and said a farewell message in Cleveland's voice.

Starting with "Rock Hard", long-time recurring actor Patrick Warburton was promoted to the main cast.

=== 20th anniversary ===
Fox celebrated the twentieth season with a special digital panel, with a promotional trailer unveiled during the 2021 San Diego Comic-Con virtual event, teasing clips from the season. In commemoration, FXX set a near full series marathon of all 19 seasons of the show, running from December 25, 2021, to January 2, 2022. A promotional PSA short made to promote COVID-19 vaccines was released on September 21, 2021. MacFarlane himself remarked on the show's milestone.

"We're really excited to continue marketing to the key 'force of habit' demographic for a nearly unprecedented 20th season, Our longtime fans who will continue to only occasionally glance up from their computers or phones every so often can look forward to being disappointed all over again that they fought so hard to bring this show back. Whether they're laughing at the occasional brilliant or biting satirical take, or groaning at our lazy, lowbrow, punch-down jokes, they can at least remember how this show used to be well-written and subversive while arranging anonymous hookups on Grindr."

In addition, sweepstakes were held by TBS where entrees had a chance to win T-shirts, Mugs and Blankets. as well as a re-release of the book, "Family Guy: An Illustrated History".

=== Release ===
The season premiered on September 26, 2021, airing on Sundays as part of Fox's Animation Domination programming block, along with The Simpsons, Bob's Burgers, Duncanville and The Great North. In Canada, the season aired new episodes 2 weeks after its airdate in United States on Disney+ through its Star hub. In the UK, the season started airing new episodes every Wednesday on Disney+ through its Star hub starting on November 3. In Australia, new episodes air weekly on Disney+ simultaneously with 7 Mate.

=== Critical reception ===
John Schwarz with Bubbleblabber.com gave the season a positive review, stating, "I think Family Guy season 20 is a bit of a "rebuilding year" for the show. For starters, the series introduced not just the aforementioned Zahir doing an awesome job as the new voice of Cleveland, but also the likes of Chris Parnell, Peter Macon, Jay Pharoah, and Patton Oswalt have all portrayed new characters that appear to be on the road to that of "recurring" status, and all of whom play really funny and fresh new characters." Schwarz praised the risks taken in the episode 'First Blood,' though he criticized the focus on anthology episodes, mainly 'Rock Hard' and 'HBO-No'. He concluded, "Parnell and Zahir are the types of ingredients that can really help put new logs on this fire to keep it warm, and we await if this franchise has the goods to go another 20 seasons."
