= Family Guy season 22 =

Season of television series

Family Guy
- Season 22
- Digital purchase image
- Showrunners: Richard Appel; Alec Sulkin
- Starring: Seth MacFarlane; Alex Borstein; Seth Green; Mila Kunis; Mike Henry; Patrick Warburton; Arif Zahir
- No. of episodes: 15

Release
- Original network: Fox
- Original release: October 1, 2023 – April 17, 2024

Season chronology
- ← Previous; Season 21 Next → Season 23

The twenty-second season of the American animated television series Family Guy premiered on Fox on October 1, 2023 and concluded on April 17, 2024.

The series follows the dysfunctional Griffin family, consisting of father Peter, mother Lois, daughter Meg, son Chris, baby Stewie, and the family dog Brian, who reside in their hometown of Quahog, Rhode Island.

Season twenty-two started the run of the twenty-first production season, which is executive produced by Seth MacFarlane, Alec Sulkin, Richard Appel, Steve Callaghan, Danny Smith, Kara Vallow, Mark Hentemann, Tom Devanney, Patrick Meighan, and Alex Carter. Sulkin and Appel returned as the series' showrunners. Like every season, there are hiatus breaks in between episodes. The season premiered on ITV2 (UK) on September 2, 2024.

== Voice cast and characters ==
- Seth MacFarlane as Peter Griffin, Brian Griffin, Stewie Griffin, Glenn Quagmire, Tom Tucker, Carter Pewterschmidt, Dr. Elmer Hartman, Seamus, God
- Alex Borstein as Lois Griffin, Elle Hitler
- Seth Green as Chris Griffin
- Mila Kunis as Meg Griffin
- Mike Henry as John Herbert, Bruce
- Patrick Warburton as Joe Swanson
- Arif Zahir as Cleveland Brown

=== Supporting characters ===
- Gary Cole as Principal Shepherd
- Sam Elliott as Mayor Wild West
- Sanaa Lathan as Donna Tubbs-Brown
- Peter Macon as Preston Lloyd
- Jennifer Tilly as Bonnie Swanson
- Kevin Michael Richardson as Jerome

== Episodes ==
No. overall	No. in season	Title	Directed by	Written by	Original release date	Prod. code	U.S. viewers (millions)
410	1	"Fertilized Megg"	Julius Wu	Maggie Mull	October 1, 2023	NACX01	1.03
After she and Chris are tasked with taking Stewie to a birthday party at the bowling alley, Meg stays behind to help Bruce clean up, hearing him express his desire to have a child. Meg offers to be Bruce and Jeffrey's surrogate despite Peter and Lois' disapproval and the resulting mood swings and rank food cravings get on her family's nerves. Several months later, Meg gives birth to Bruce and Jeffrey's daughter, Liza Judy Barbra. When Bruce and Jeffrey need some more time to get their house ready, Meg offers to raise Liza for the time being, but becomes attached to her as the first living thing that needs her and repeatedly delays Bruce and Jeffrey's arrival to spend more time with her. But after Liza says the names of some gay icons, Meg takes it as proof that she wants to be with her fathers and returns her to Bruce and Jeffrey.
411	2	"Supermarket Pete"	Greg Colton	Joanna Quraishi	October 8, 2023	MACX18	0.86
Preston announces that the Pawtucket Brewery will be transitioning to an open floor plan overseen by the WeWork Lunatic, giving Peter two unpaid months off until construction is finished. Lois suggests that he get a different job in the meantime, but is shocked when he decides to work at the Stop 'N Shop. Fed up with his incompetence at the job, Lois snaps at Peter, getting herself banned from the store. At Bonnie's suggestion, Lois tries to get back at Peter by getting a job at The Drunken Clam, but Peter is unfazed. Lois explains that the grocery store served as her escape and was ruined by Peter's presence. Peter confesses to the manager (Jay Pharoah) that he is not mentally disabled, having been hired under that pretense, which gets Lois unbanned. Meanwhile, Joe fails to get his friends invested in the murder case stories from his job, but manages to catch Brian's attention. The two decide to crack one of his cases as the basis for a true crime novel. While they are not able to get anything out of the victim's family, they accidentally find a key to a storage unit, where they are ambushed by Sarah Koenig, Keith Morrison, and Chris Hansen among other journalists, hoping to crack the case for themselves and hog the credit. A fight breaks out between them, allowing Brian and Joe to see their own actions as exploitative, so they decide not to finish the book. In the final scene, Peter gets his old job back as Preston informs him that the construction is canceled due to the WeWork Lunatic misusing the budget.
412	3	"A 'Stache from the Past"	Jerry Langford	Travis Bowe	October 22, 2023	MACX19	0.76
At the flea market, Stewie gets a new teapot from Bruce, while Peter is barred by Lois from buying Dr. Hartman's old Mr. Potato Head due to its $400 price tag. Upset, Peter is swayed by a commercial from Tom Selleck (Josh Robert Thompson), convincing him to sign up for a reverse mortgage and get more spending money, but while it does get him the toy, it runs the risk of the Griffins losing their house. He sets out for New York City to find Selleck alongside Mayor Wild West, who was once in a band with him, but the two are arrested before they can confront him. Only by becoming extras on Blue Bloods can they get close enough. West reconciles with Selleck by playing their old single, while Peter gets to keep his house in exchange for a line in the next Blue Bloods episode. Meanwhile, Stewie sells his new teapot for a high price, enabling him to buy more antiques to sell off at the flea market. Brian agrees to help, but the two are confronted by Bruce for encroaching on his turf. They agree to battle it out to see who can sell more, and Brian and Stewie end up winning due to a conveniently placed trash can by Bruce's booth, which attracts a swarm of bees. Despite winning, Stewie grows sick of working in the flea market and makes his exit by outing most of the booth owners as pedophiles.
413	4	"Old World Harm"	Joe Vaux	Evan Waite	November 5, 2023	MACX20	1.37
Lois saves up enough money for a couple's vacation, but Peter blows it on a failed makeshift jetpack. Joe lets Peter and Lois rent his mother's condo in Florida, but upon arrival, they discover that it is in a retirement community. They quickly grow to love it due to how kindly they're treated by the older folks simply for being the youngest and healthiest there. This turns out to be a ruse by the elders (their leader voiced by Henry Winkler) to harvest Peter and Lois' organs, out of envy towards their more functional bodies. Meanwhile, Stewie is inspired to stop taking baths and switch to showers after being reminded of Whitney Houston's death. He enlists Brian's help to face his fear despite the latter's own traumatic shower experience from his puppyhood. After stalling for a bit, the two are overwhelmed by the shower's water pressure, but when the tub starts to fill, Stewie uses his knowledge of baths to remove Meg's hair from the drain and save them both. Regardless, both of them agree to never take a shower again. After Lois discovers the elders' scheme, she and Peter try to flee and only manage to escape due to the confrontation cutting into the seniors' dinnertime, causing them to retreat. Lois nonetheless declares this the best vacation she's ever been on due to the thrill of it all while commenting that Joe might've been kept in the dark about this. Unbeknownst to them, Joe set the trip up to harvest Peter's or Lois' legs, using an alias "JOEY". Upon learning that the plan failed, he tells the person on the other end of the phone that he'll send Cleveland on the same trip. Cleveland later returns with no legs as Joe, who is sporting Cleveland's legs, asks how his vacation was.
414	5	"Baby, It's Cold Inside"	Joseph Lee	Danny Smith	November 12, 2023	NACX02	1.20
Peter forgets to make plans for his and Lois' anniversary, but is bailed out by Seamus who lends them a boat for a dinner on the ocean. During a skinny dip, a dolphin approaches them, but Peter flees upon mistaking it for a shark, ditching Lois in the water. Although she is unharmed, Lois is disappointed in Peter for not being the alpha she needs in her life despite forgiving him. When his attempts to make it up to her fail, Quagmire suggests they fake a similar incident in order for Peter to save Lois, but the guys' plan falls apart. Lois saves Peter from an actual shark and quickly discovers the ruse, but is content, having discovered that she herself was the alpha in her life. The two have make-up sex by the harbor as the guys look on. Meanwhile, Stewie finds a discarded mini-fridge while out on a walk and beats Danny DeVito to claiming it. He decides to keep it in his room despite Brian's concerns about him being too little to have one. Stewie converts his bedroom into a college dorm, complete with a roommate named Guy and claiming that he enrolled in the University of College. While throwing a college party, he calls Brian out for how he is suddenly obsessed over his safety. Brian agrees to loosen up, but they accidentally leave the fridge cracked during the party. In the final scene, Lois sees Peter off to work as Brian discovers that Stewie has fatally frozen solid. Brian breaks down in tears as the ending to The Shining is parodied.
415	6	"Boston Stewie"	Mike Kim	Patrick Meighan	November 19, 2023	NACX03	0.98
While reading the mail, Stewie discovers that he has a half-sibling due to Lois donating eggs in 1997, and strives to seek them out. However, it turns out that this baby is a crass, orphaned thug from Boston, Massachusetts who only resembles Stewie physically. While letting him stay at the Griffins' house for a while, Stewie uses his thuggery to push around the adults in his life, but Boston Stewie expresses his desires to be adopted after seeing Stewie get a kiss from Lois. Meanwhile, Meg attempts to humiliate Chris after he sits on some cupcakes she made by posting a picture of the mess online. After the post goes viral, the two decide to start a FansOnly where Chris will sit on food to earn money. Chris later freaks out and quits after noticing the mixed reception, stressful environment, and knee stuff requests. Peter steps in as a substitute, but his demands drive Meg crazy. Stewie spends the next week cleaning up his counterpart's act and following a misstep with one potential couple at the adoption fair, Boston Stewie is taken in by Mark Wahlberg's seven sisters (one voiced by Casey Wilson). Chris decides to continue sitting on food for money in the vein of a prostitute, but when he feels undervalued, Meg reassures him that he is valuable and the two make up by sitting on cupcakes together. In the final scene, Meg goes through a musical montage of shutting down their venture.
416	7	"Snap(ple) Decision"	Brian Iles	Travis Bowe	November 26, 2023	NACX04	0.88
While Peter competes in a greasy pole contest, Meg is forced to fill in for him during his errands with Lois. At the Quahog Mini-Mart, Lois grabs a random Snapple and wins a $10,000 cash prize, which she plans to spend on a home water filtration system. However, Meg convinces her to be a cool parent for once, like Peter, and the two set out on a secret tropical vacation. Meanwhile, following a misunderstanding over a planned lunch, Stewie suggests he and Brian see a friendship therapist named Dr. Wagner, whose exercises fail to help. He snaps at the pair, deeming their relationship toxic and imploring them to break up. Dubbing themselves the "Snapple Babes", Lois and Meg flaunt their earnings and draw the attention of father-son criminals who kidnap them, mistaking them for heiresses to the Snapple company. They refuse to let the pair go even after learning that they guessed wrong, but Lois manages to bust herself and Meg out using the seemingly useless items from her purse. Upon arriving home, she explains to Meg the importance of having a less cool, more responsible parent. Back in Quahog, things get complicated when Brian and Stewie both attend the same wedding and attempt to avoid each other before they can't take it anymore and decide to remain best friends despite their hurdles. They celebrate by taking photos in a booth. According to a narrating Cleveland, they argue again about the use of props and break up again only to reconcile at another wedding.
417	8	"Baking Sad"	John Holmquist	Damien Fahey	December 3, 2023	NACX05	1.26
After a day full of setbacks, Meg tries to unwind by making some cookies, but when she is rejected from the University of Rhode Island in the middle of doing so, she unintentionally cries into the batter, which results in the cookies tasting excellent. Alongside Brian, Stewie, and Chris, Meg decides to turn this into a business venture named "Meg Ahoy!", which quickly takes off. Meanwhile, Peter dislikes how woman-centric Lois' preferred daytime talk shows are, so he starts one on Channel 5 aimed at men alongside Quagmire, Cleveland, and Joe. Their show Bar Table Talk does quite well, although Lois, who believes such a job is unfit for men, is annoyed by the guys' comments as well as how their new fame has gone to their heads. Alongside an equally fed-up Donna and Bonnie, Lois intends to ruin the show from within the studio audience. She ultimately can't bring herself to do it after seeing Peter run out of talking points and admit he was wrong for once, prompting the two to make up. Right as Meg, Chris, Brian, and Stewie are invited by Carter Pewterschmidt to cater for a party, they discover that due to their success, Meg is too happy to cry. A therapist later reveals that Meg is actually happy because of the quality time spent with her siblings rather than the money she's earned. This prompts the group to shut down their business, valuing Meg's happiness over materialism, unaware that this was what the therapist, revealed to be Mr. Fields, intended to happen. Mr. Fields and everyone else in the building ultimately perish after a gas leak that causes them to laugh maniacally.
418	9	"The Return of the King (of Queens)"	Greg Colton	Alex Carter	December 17, 2023	NACX07	1.44
Lois sells the Griffins' TV in order to afford Christmas presents, much to the chagrin of Peter, who prefers network television over streaming services. Following some convincing from everyone including Joe, Cleveland, and Quagmire, Peter decides to give Netflix a try, but is interrupted by Kevin James (Josh Robert Thompson), who is now unemployed due to Peter, his last viewer, losing access to his TV. Peter agrees to let James crash at the Griffins' house after noticing how he is stuck in sitcom mode, promising to teach him how to live like a real-world man. Despite succeeding at this, James finds that his body is evaporating, which according to Dr. Hartman, is due to him losing relevancy. Knowing that adulation from a live audience can cure his condition, the two start pitching sitcom ideas for him alongside Brian and the kids. When Lois notifies them about the upcoming Nativity play at Town Hall, Peter gets the idea to have James star in it. The plan almost fails until Peter wins the crowd over with a speech about the benefits of network TV, which helps James get his body back. As old sitcom stars like Zach Braff, George Wendt, Jenna Elfman, Tony Danza, and Traylor Howard emerge from a cornfield, various TV executives including Les Moonves arrive and offer James some new work. With his career revived, he rises into the sky and disappears in a burst of stars. Lois also allows Peter to have his TV back. The episode ends with Stewie and Brian at 20th Century Studios pitching their idea from the earlier brainstorming session Baker's Dozen only to find that Chris' idea Big Wonder won over the executives first. Stewie decides to take the Baker's Dozen idea to Scott Rudin, only for the abusive producer to throw a computer at him offscreen.
419	10	"Cabin Pressure"	Jerry Langford	Matt McElaney	March 6, 2024	NACX09	0.92
Peter takes his family to the company picnic, where Preston offers a five-night stay at his cabin in the town of Mooseattackee, Maine to whichever team wins the egg toss. Peter and Lois cheat by using a hard-boiled egg, and despite the latter's skepticism, decide to invite Quagmire, Joe, Bonnie, and the Brown-Tubbs on their family vacation as well. With everyone under one roof, tensions rise when Peter takes the fall for Lois clogging the main toilet, and Quagmire's daily itinerary prevents Peter from seeing the bear show he was looking forward to. After learning that the venue is closed permanently from an employee (Patton Oswalt), Peter blows up at everyone, burning Quagmire's schedule and accidentally damaging the cabin in the process. Everyone leaves, hurt by Peter's comments, forcing him to repair the cabin himself despite various distractions and the imminent arrival of Preston with extra towels. Ultimately, everyone returns and apologizes after Lois tells them that the gathering was Peter's idea, though the group fails to fix the cabin before Preston arrives. When Peter takes full responsibility for what happened, Preston is relieved to see it destroyed, revealing that he only owned it to open a legal shell corporation and now gets to save some money. The families stay with him for the remainder of the week. Peter is glad to see everything back to normal. In a twist ending, it's revealed that the episode was just a dream Peter had while suffering a heart attack during the egg toss.
420	11	"Teacher's Heavy Pet"	Steve Robertson	Chris Regan	March 13, 2024	NACX06	0.77
At the Homecoming football game, Lois notes how Chris has been crowned Homecoming Dunce four times in a row. By manifesting the credentials, she snags a position as a substitute teacher at Adam West High following the retirement of Mr. Trampledon. Lois does this by putting on a disguise and going by her maiden name. In class, Chris has to contend with two of the cool kids (Jimmy Tatro and Jack Quaid) objectifying his mother, but by feigning attraction to "Ms. Pewterschmidt," driving home with her, and making up stories, Chris fools the cool kids into thinking they're having sex, quickly becoming popular much to Meg's disgust. Eventually, the cool kids demand more proof of the relationship in the form of a nude photo of Lois. Chris snaps one while she's in the shower and it quickly spreads throughout the school, even reaching Principal Shepherd. Upon discovering this, Lois demands that Chris fess up to everyone, but backpedals upon hearing why her son lied. She ends up contradicting his confession by lying about having sex with him, preserving his popularity. Chris' closing narration states that Lois got six years in prison for sex with a minor, Asher died in an e-bike accident, and Chris married Elizabeth Hurley's strangely attractive son taking on his last name.
421	12	"Take This Job and Love It"	Joe Vaux	Steve Callaghan	March 20, 2024	NACX08	0.72
At the Drunken Clam, Peter laments the fact that he's stuck working at the Pawtucket Brewery and never obtained his dream job. Joe gets the idea for everyone to share their dream jobs.: Spoofing James Bond, Peter imagines himself as Agent 555, Lap Band. He is ordered by M (Donna) to meet Agent Alice Boobs (Lois) in Belgium and stop the evil Blofella (Stewie), who is plotting to blow up Las Vegas with a stolen nuclear device to get out of a terrible timeshare. Lap Band and Blofella get lost during their extended casino chase, but the latter escapes by distracting Lap Band with a Santana concert. On the roof, Lap Band uses Kylo Ren's lightsaber to knock Blofella off the roof, saving Alice in the process, but turns down her advances after announcing that he's gay.; Quagmire imagines himself as an overweight bachelor in the 1980s who invents aerobics to lose weight and creates a popular new workout craze. While promoting his invention on The Tonight Show Starring Johnny Carson guest-hosted by John Davidson, Quagmire meets Jane Fonda during the interview. Fonda sabotages him on set by stealing his leg warmers and leaving a note for him. With his legs too cold to exercise, Quagmire's career plummets as Fonda steals his idea and prospers. With Quagmire's gym out of business, Fonda visits him to gloat about her victory. Peter then fast-forwards through Quagmire's ranting and raving towards Fonda.; Spoofing Lethal Weapon, Cleveland envisions himself as a member of the Los Angeles Police Department who is close to retirement. For his last assignment, he is tasked by the chief of police (Carter) to track down a cocaine cartel with the help of Sergeant Maniac, a walking loose-cannon cop who Joe envisions himself as. The two are kicked off the case after being distracted at Leed's, but follow a lead to the docks where they find that the chief of police was in charge of the drug operation. Most of the cartel members are killed, but the chief of police claims that he has diplomatic immunity. After taking him out, Cleveland is briefly held in court only to be let go due to his illegal actions being justified.
422	13	"Lifeguard Meg"	Julius Wu	Patrick Meighan	March 27, 2024	NACX10	0.76
At the Quahog Family Ocean Park, Meg earns a lifeguard job after rescuing Stewie from drowning in the dolphin and manatee exhibit. She enjoys her new workplace due to her newfound solitude away from her abusive family. Meanwhile, Stewie and Brian are handed ownership of a local coffee shop called Sunny Side Cup following the cancellation of its previous owner over a tweet, but forget to buy any coffee to serve the customers. Brian saves face by selling Folgers from the bodega next door, but his ruse is revealed by Principal Shepherd. The younger customers don't mind the revelation, but Brian and Stewie are soon canceled themselves after it is revealed by someone that the former harasses AOC via DM. The two hand ownership to Principal Shepherd, who overhauls the place with a teacher's lounge theme. Meg's new job is ruined when Peter receives a discounted season pass, bringing Joe, Quagmire, and Cleveland with him. She chases them out when they violate the rules, but ends up having to perform CPR on Peter, the procedure being mistaken for incest as the Griffins become a laughing stock. Lois is especially upset by the news, but changes her tune after Peter falls unconscious on the stairs, though Stewie resuscitates him instead. Peter apologizes to Meg for encroaching on her personal space, but his narration reveals that no one resuscitated him, forcing him to wake up by himself with permanent disabilities. In the final scene, Meg tells her family that she quit her job due to a decrease in temperature while Principal Shepherd's coffee shop is a big success.
423	14	"Fat Actor"	Joseph Lee	Mark Hentemann	April 10, 2024	NACX11	0.78
Tom Tucker announces that a new biopic about Chris Christie is due to be filmed in Quahog, but Peter is upset that the lead role was given to Brad Pitt (Damien Fahey) and not an overweight actor. After protesting the matter with Brian, Dr. Hartman, Principal Shepherd, and others like him, Peter is hired by the film's producer to be a "fat guy consultant" and trains Pitt in the plus-sized lifestyle, but not before showing him off to his friends and family. Upon becoming fat, Pitt is unable to play the role due to a thrown-out back, and Peter is hired to take his place. Christie is filmed with almost no issues, though the reception at the premiere event is lukewarm, with even Peter noting how poor of an actor he is. Despite Brian being proud of his commitment to inclusivity, Peter realizes that acting should be left to professionals, who can lend more interpretation to the role. In the final scene, Stewie mentions to Brian about how he got the acting bug and worked in a version of A Streetcar Named Desire.
424	15	"Faith No More"	Mike Kim	Alex Carter	April 17, 2024	NACX12	0.79
At the vet, Brian has a new tracking chip implanted and quickly falls for Emma, the nurse responsible. Despite the aspects of her life that cater to his dog instincts, Brian is turned off by the fact that Emma is an Evangelical Christian. While on a date at a Christian rock concert, Brian snaps after she refuses to have sex with him out of wedlock and wishes that Christianity never existed. He decides to use Stewie's time machine, with Stewie tagging along after tracking his new chip, altering the past so that Jesus Christ becomes a stand-up comic as opposed to a messiah which he persuaded his father God to let him pursue. This creates an alternate present in which Judaism is the world's dominant religion which Brian is okay with until he learns about what Shabbat entails. Stewie time travels to prevent Judaism from existing as well by paying Moses to walk away resulting in a completely religion-free reality. Appearing as a delivery man, God beats them up for their actions. While Stewie decides to undo this new reality, Brian refuses as God starts to descend on them. The final scene of the episode shows an injured Stewie and Brian singing hymns at church after undoing their actions.

== Production ==
On January 26, 2023, Fox announced that Family Guy had been renewed for a twenty-second and twenty-third season while ensuring that the series will last another two years.

Family Guy moved from Sunday nights to Wednesday nights beginning on March 6, 2024, while Grimsburg takes it's Sunday night time slot for 9:30 p.m., respectively.

This season marked the switch to 15 episode seasons as part of their prior renewal.

=== Release ===
The season premiered on October 1, 2023, during the 2023–24 television season on Fox's Animation Domination block along with Bob's Burgers, Krapopolis and The Simpsons, however beginning on March 6, 2024, the show moved to Wednesday nights where it aired alongside The Masked Singer and Animal Control.
