= Family Guy season 19 =

Season of television series

Family Guy
- Season 19
- Digital purchase image
- Showrunners: Richard Appel; Alec Sulkin
- Starring: Seth MacFarlane; Alex Borstein; Seth Green; Mila Kunis; Mike Henry
- No. of episodes: 20

Release
- Original network: Fox
- Original release: September 27, 2020 – May 16, 2021

Season chronology
- ← Previous; Season 18 Next → Season 20

The nineteenth season of Family Guy aired on Fox from September 27, 2020, to May 16, 2021.

The series follows the dysfunctional Griffin family, consisting of father Peter, mother Lois, daughter Meg, son Chris, baby Stewie, and the family dog Brian, who reside in their hometown of Quahog.

Season nineteen premiered the run of the eighteenth production season, which was executive produced by Seth MacFarlane, Alec Sulkin, Richard Appel, Steve Callaghan, Danny Smith, Kara Vallow, Mark Hentemann, Tom Devanney and Patrick Meighan. Sulkin and Appel returned as the series' showrunners.

During this season, Stewie says his first word ("Stewie's First Word"), Peter becomes an Italian mob boss ("La Famiglia Guy"), Peter finds out his mortal enemy Ernie the Giant Chicken is dying ("Fecal Matters"), Quahog gets a new mayor, voiced by Sam Elliot ("Wild Wild West"), Meg adopts a cat ("Family Cat") and Brian and Stewie go on a Terminator-esque adventure to save Stewie's life ("PeTerminator").

== Voice cast and characters ==
- Seth MacFarlane as Peter Griffin, Brian Griffin, Stewie Griffin, Glenn Quagmire, Tom Tucker, Dr. Hartman
- Alex Borstein as Lois Griffin
- Seth Green as Chris Griffin, Neil Goldman
- Mila Kunis as Meg Griffin
- Mike Henry as Cleveland Brown, Bruce

=== Supporting characters ===
- Johnny Brennan as Mort Goldman
- Chris Parnell as Doug
- Kevin Michael Richardson as Jerome
- Patrick Warburton as Joe Swanson
- Jennifer Tilly as Bonnie Swanson

== Episodes ==
No. overall	No. in season	Title	Directed by	Written by	Original release date	Prod. code	U.S. viewers (millions)
350	1	"Stewie's First Word"	Mike Kim	Patrick Meighan	September 27, 2020	JACX19	1.86
After a bad morning, ending with his being denied a cookie at church, Stewie loudly screams the word "fuck", causing Lois to be shunned by the entire town. Wondering where Stewie could have heard what she believes is his first word, Lois initially suspects television, but Brian points out that all Stewie watches now is Caillou, which she learns has no bad language, just odd dialogue and it mentions Wikipedia. She then guesses Peter to be the source of Stewie swearing, and waxes the stairs for him to fall (again), though Peter only shouts proper terms as he has been hanging out with Caillou's dad. When Lois eventually discovers herself to be the root of Stewie's profanity, she goes to a rehabilitation facility, where she gets scolded for using the F-word as her meditation mantra, and decides to accept her swearing habits and states she is fine with how she is. Meanwhile, Peter tries to bond with Stewie but ends up getting drunk on Lois' frozen booze and pelting him with rocks using the lawnmower. When Lois returns home, Stewie says "Mommy!" — which Lois unsuccessfully attempts to catch on video a few times. Brian thinks Stewie is finally over his desire to kill Lois, but Stewie tells him that it was a trick.
351	2	"The Talented Mr. Stewie"	Greg Colton	Gary Janetti	October 4, 2020	JACX20	1.36
Stewie dumps Rupert when he learns he used to belong to Chris. He tries to get revenge by getting a new teddy bear and then a toy giraffe, but neither helps him feel better. After taking a spiritual journey, Stewie concludes he must kill Chris and Rupert. Stewie lures Chris to a lake house he rented and knocks him out. He fights Chris in the rowboat while discussing The Talented Mr. Ripley and that it is not an Alfred Hitchcock film. Stewie knocks Chris out and into the water. Using the nanny cam he put in Rupert earlier to keep an eye on him and Chris, Stewie learns Chris was going to give him back. After a few unsuccessful tries, Stewie manages to save Chris. As the latter recovers in the hospital, they agree to never reveal what happened.
352	3	"Boys & Squirrels"	Joe Vaux	Steve Callaghan	October 11, 2020	KACX02	1.48
Peter chops down a tree with a chainsaw, leaving a young squirrel orphaned, which Chris and Stewie decide to raise together. Peter goes to Dr. Hartman and gets chiropractic therapy, making him taller. Depressed, he seeks Lois' help and she can shrink him by verbally abusing him. Meanwhile, after Chris and Stewie's squirrel recovers, they try to shoot a video of its first steps, only for Brian to snatch and maul it to death. After the funeral, Chris starts to pack the squirrel's things away but this triggers an argument and blame game between him and Stewie. They end up going for counseling with Bruce and working out most of their issues. At Christmas, Stewie retrieves the mail and finds a Christmas card that they had sent with their picture with the squirrel, causing him to break down in tears.
353	4	"Cutawayland"	Brian Iles	Patrick Meighan	November 1, 2020 (Note: This episode was originally scheduled to air on October 18, 2020, in the United States but was preempted as a result of the 2020 National League Championship Series running overtime. The episode still aired on its originally scheduled air date in Canada on Citytv.)	KACX01	1.83
While spending a day at the beach with their children, Lois and Peter try to find a secluded spot to have sex but keep getting interrupted by the children. At home, when Brian and the kids annoy them again, the two yell at them and do a cutaway joke simultaneously, causing them to be sent into the cutaway. They soon understand they have been teleported to an alternate universe where all the show's cutaways reside and new ones are made, which Lois dubs "Cutawayland". They also learn it takes two people to send them to Cutawayland and one person to move them around cutaways by creating one or mentioning a previous one. While Brian and the kids call Joe to find Peter and Lois, the two enjoy their time in Cutawayland, until the latter decides she wants to return to their family and persuades Peter to do the same. However, they instead cause the rest of the family to be teleported into Cutawayland as well. Unable to return home or change cutaways, Peter calls Joe for help. Joe does some research online and discovers that, to return home, they must go back to the very first cutaway of the show and kill Adolf Hitler. Meg decapitates him, allowing them to return home. It is revealed that Peter fell asleep while at the beach and the entire adventure was a dream.
354	5	"La Famiglia Guy"	John Holmquist	Alex Carter	November 8, 2020	KACX03	1.52
The Griffins attend Susie's christening at an Italian restaurant, during which Joe asks Peter to be Susie's godfather. Mistaking the term for the title used by the Mafia, Peter begins acting like a Don and scares the restaurant staff, who give him everything he wants. He later recruits Joe, Quagmire, and Cleveland into his crew, and together they operate various rackets in Quahog, until running afoul of the real Mafia. Meanwhile, Chris, who has been sent by Peter to Italy, finds love and tries to start a new life, only for his wife to die in a car bombing after Peter tries to call Chris to tell him the Mafia might go after him separately. To take down the Mafia bosses, Joe devises a plan to have Peter wear a wire while attending a meeting with them in Quahog, but he blows his cover when the Dons suggest going out for karaoke. Peter is saved when Joe and his men storm the meeting to apprehend everyone in attendance. One of the Dons takes Peter and Joe hostage, but they are rescued by a jar of Prego spaghetti sauce. As the Griffins return to their normal life, Brian, who has endured three Mafia movie-style deaths during the episode for annoying different family members, admits to drinking Lois' last bottle of wine. While the two have a walk in the woods, Lois tells Brian that she does not watch Mafia movies, and kills him in a Fargo-inspired fashion by throwing him into a wood chipper.
355	6	"Meg's Wedding"	Steve Robertson	Mike Desilets	November 15, 2020	KACX05	1.79
Unable to secure a date for a school dance, Meg instead hangs out at the bowling alley with her friend and shoe rental guy Bruce. They quickly build up a relationship, but Lois is concerned that Bruce, who has always been shown to be attracted to men, does not love her, and tries to convince Meg to break up with him. Under pressure from his parents, Bruce later proposes to Meg, who accepts. At Bruce and Meg's wedding, Lois finally decides to accept their relationship, but Meg realizes Bruce is gay and that he is not happy, and encourages him to reveal his homosexuality to his parents. Bruce then proposes to his boyfriend Jeffrey, and the two get married with Peter officiating after the priest refused to do so.
356	7	"Wild Wild West"	Jerry Langford	Kirker Butler	November 22, 2020	KACX08	1.68
Since the death of Mayor Adam West, Quahog has been left in rough shape. Concluding the city needs a new mayor, Lois chooses a librarian named Elle Hitler to run for office. Upset Lois would choose a third-tier character, Peter tries to persuade West's cousin, the rugged cowboy Wild West (voiced by Sam Elliott) from a cigar commercial, to do the same. While West initially declines, he arrives in Quahog on the day of the nomination and accepts Peter's offer. Lois is irritated that Peter only approached West to become mayor because he is a man, so to make amends, Peter takes her to spend a few days with him and West at the latter's mustache farm. To Peter's joy, this ends up working, but while having sex with her later, Lois calls out West's name. As revenge, Peter unsuccessfully tries to sabotage West to make him lose the election. While trying to frame West for vandalizing the library, Peter accidentally sets it on fire, leaving Elle trapped inside, but West rescues her using his levitation powers (which he previously mentioned having, but no one believed him since he never demonstrated). After winning the election with a very low turnout, West makes amends with Peter by gifting him a basket of baby mustaches and ends the episode with a song alongside the Griffins, Peter's friends, and various animals from the show thus far.
357	8	"Pawtucket Pat"	Julius Wu	Alex Carter	December 6, 2020	KACX07	1.43
Brian gets a job at a news website called the Hog. After writing various articles, he does some research about Quahog's town hero and brewery founder Pawtucket Pat. He finds his diary, which reveals that his famous beer recipe was stolen from the Narragansett tribe, whom he killed to keep the secret. Once Brian publishes his findings, a protest is held to determine the fate of Pawtucket Pat's statue. Numerous townspeople, including Peter, want to keep it, so a frustrated Brian, who wants it removed and cannot get support to do so, decides to take matters into his own hands. Alongside Stewie, he tries to tow it away but ends up ripping his car in half. Despite this setback, his actions have the desired result, as the statue falls into a river. The following day, while Stewie fears that he and Brian might go to jail and has trouble keeping the secret, the two opposing forces meet near the statue's original location and prepare to clash, but are stopped by the Indians where their leader (Lou Diamond Phillips) states that they are upset that no one asked for their opinion on their entire ordeal and make them aware that there are bigger issues at hand than just the statue. The two sides eventually make peace as the statue is recovered from the river and put on display at the museum, where no one will likely see it ever again.
358	9	"The First No L"	Joseph Lee	Damien Fahey	December 13, 2020	KACX06	1.84
Lois tells the family that, unlike usual Christmases, they will be helping with the Christmas shopping while she gets everything else ready. They end up at the strip mall because Peter did not fill up the gas tank and fails to get anything, much to Lois' anger. Peter rushes out the door and jumps in the car to get presents and a tree, but falls asleep and dreams he bought a tree and saved their Christmas. A furious Lois leaves, claiming she needs to spend Christmas with her cousin in Cabo. The rest of the family decide to try and save Christmas in her absence, but find it harder than they thought, while Lois secretly spies on them from a nearby motel. After much struggle, Peter manages to decorate the roof in a fit of rage, giving the family hope. A jealous Lois breaks into the house on Christmas Eve to steal the presents and tree in a parody of How the Grinch Stole Christmas!, leaving the Griffins saddened when they wake up to no presents the following morning. When Lois "returns from Mexico", the family gifts her a long heartfelt note about how much they care about her, and a poorly made bowl they crafted together. Touched by the presents, Lois hugs and thanks to her family as her heart grows three times in size (again reminiscent of the Grinch), landing her in the hospital, and does not reveal she stole the gifts.
359	10	"Fecal Matters"	Mike Kim & Dominic Bianchi	Artie Johann	January 17, 2021	JACX09	3.22
Peter volunteers as a nurse in the hospital when he is the only Griffin to not catch the flu during an outbreak. He is confronted by a moral dilemma when he learns that his longtime enemy, Ernie the Giant Chicken, is on his deathbed after refusing to take the vaccine for "chicken cancer", which also caused his wife to leave him for a bigger rooster. Peter eventually decides to save him, not wanting to take full responsibility for the destruction caused by their many fights and believing that having a nemesis makes his own life more exciting. Meanwhile, Brian takes a 23andMe test and learns that he is 1% cat, making him question his lifestyle. After Brian gets severely injured in a failed attempt to land on his feet trying to prove his claim to Quagmire, Stewie assures Brian that his genetic makeup does not matter, as long as others appreciate him for who he is.
360	11	"Boy's Best Friend"	Mike Kim	Steve Callaghan	February 21, 2021 (Note: This episode was originally scheduled to air on February 14, 2021, in the United States but was preempted due to rain delays during the 2021 Daytona 500, which prompted new episodes meant to air that night to be shown next Sunday night.)	KACX09	1.31
Brian begins dating a shoe store clerk named Holly and bonds with her young son Kyle as he helps him build a pinewood car for an upcoming derby. However, Holly eventually breaks up with Brian to date other people, meaning that he and Kyle cannot see each other anymore. After encouragement from Stewie, Brian decides to attend the derby, but arrives too late and finds that Kyle has finished next to last. Still, he and Holly are grateful Brian made an effort to show up, and Holly allows Brian and Kyle to continue being friends. Later, Brian agrees to babysit Kyle while Holly goes out on a date. Meanwhile, Joe inherits a classic sports car from his late uncle, who also leaves him strict instructions that he did not drive it. When Peter, Quagmire, and Cleveland get annoyed that the car is going to waste, they decide to take it out for a drive themselves, only for Peter to end up crashing it. He tries to fix the car, but only damages it further, and is eventually forced to tell Joe the truth. Joe forgives Peter, admitting that he is relieved the car is gone because it required constant care, and the guys decide to take Joe for a drive in the remains of the car by working the pedals for him.
361	12	"And Then There's Fraud"	Brian Iles	Kevin Biggins	February 28, 2021	KACX10	1.45
After attending a baseball game and accidentally selling a baseball to a fan, Peter and Chris are inspired to sell fake sports memorabilia. This works until they sell a fake hat that Quagmire thought was worn by Sully Sullenberger. Stewie gets extensive plastic surgery to make himself look younger after a museum ticket taker mistakes him for a three-year-old. Meanwhile, due to an unstated incident, Meg is forced to wear an ankle monitor bracelet and remain close to her family members. She later cuts off her foot to go into hiding.
362	13	"PeTerminator"	Joe Vaux	Mark Hentemann	March 7, 2021	KACX12	1.15
Vowing revenge on Lois after she forces him to eat broccoli, Stewie plans to build a Terminator-Esque robot modeled after Peter, but quickly scraps the blueprints when he realizes that the technology is too advanced. Nonetheless, a robot resembling his design shows up from the future and tries to kill Stewie. After he and Brian incapacitate it, the duo decide to head into the future using a portal gun with Stewie noting that Rick and Morty borrowed some of their material. There, they learn that the PeTerminator was reprogrammed by the future Brian after an Instagram comment destroyed their friendship. Retreating to the present, Stewie and Brian are hounded by a scourge of other robots resembling numerous Family Guy characters but can stop the takeover by kissing, solidifying their friendship.
363	14	"The Marrying Kind"	Greg Colton	Travis Bowe	March 14, 2021	KACX11	1.35
After attending Mort's wedding in New Orleans where he remarried a woman named Rachel, Stewie becomes inspired to give married life a try, so he has a bride mailed over from Ukraine. Stewie likes the mundane parts of marriage but has no interest in having sex with his wife, so Brian's cuckolding turns out to be manageable. Meanwhile, as a result of the same trip, Peter and Chris develop an addiction to hotel breakfast buffets and decide to eat at everyone they can find in Quahog while coming up with different ways to get in without paying.
364	15	"Customer of the Week"	John Holmquist	Artie Johann	March 28, 2021	KACX13	1.26
After an early morning of being neglected or grossed out by her family's misbehavior (including Brian's anal gland issues), Lois goes to her favorite coffee shop House of Brews, and befriends all of the baristas there in hopes of earning the somewhat-coveted "Customer of the Week" award. However, after an angry Lois is passed over twice, Lois drugs a female barista with a bad peanut allergy by putting peanuts in her car so she can "rescue" her, only for the employee to get injured in a car accident while having an allergic reaction. Lois then learns that the House of Brews has surveillance cameras of the parking lot, so she kidnaps a worker who witnessed her, and later kidnaps his two roommates at his place, all while insisting she is a "good person". Joe and his fellow police officers figure out the story and arrest Lois. After serving six months in Quahog State Prison, Lois heads to a coffee shop named New Day Coffee in Westerly that also has a "Customer of the Week" board. While acting pleasant to the barista there, Lois takes offense that her large $5.00 tip is unnoticed.
365	16	"Who's Brian Now?"	Steve Robertson	Maggie Mull	April 11, 2021	KACX14	1.35
Peter refuses to get a haircut because his usual barber Jerry has died causing it to grow out enough to become prehensile. One of Peter's antics that had Brian check up on him has him and Peter chased by Joe and his fellow police officers. After being rescued from a drunken coma, Brian's microchip is scanned and he learns that he was previously owned by the Hendersons, a family much smarter and richer than the Griffins. Fed up with his current family's antics, Brian moves in with his old owners but regrets it when Mr. Henderson (Cary Elwes) and Mrs. Henderson (Judy Greer) turn out to be condescending, religious, and treat him like a pet as opposed to an equal. When the Griffins cannot properly function without their dog, Peter breaks into the Hendersons' house to get him back while assaulting them in a Road House callback. Brian concludes that he would rather be a smart person in a dumb family as opposed to the other way around. Joe arrives to arrest Peter for breaking into the Hendersons' house and assaulting them. In the presence of the injured Hendersons, Peter is on trial as a female judge asks the jury, composed of Patrick Swayze clones, if they have reached their verdict. The jury finds him not guilty as a Patrick Swayze clone states that no one backs Peter in a corner, leaving Peter pleased with the result.
366	17	"Young Parent Trap"	Jerry Langford	Emily Towers	April 18, 2021	KACX15	1.21
While attending an open house at Stewie's daycare, Peter and Lois are mistaken for millennial first-time parents and are persuaded to move into a trendy apartment complex and bring Stewie with them, hoping the experience would make them feel alive again. Meg and Chris are barely able to survive at home by themselves. Upon figuring out what their parents are up to thanks to a contact in Chris's chlorine sales side business, they disguise themselves as a millennial couple and attempt to expose their lies. The ruse eventually succeeds when the group heads to Quachella (Quahog's version of the Coachella Valley Music and Arts Festival). Lois and Peter out themselves after the walk from the parking lot to the festival wear them out. Despite this, they are relieved that they can be themselves again, and learn to accept that they are not young anymore. Chris later finds that Neil Goldman has squeezed him out of the catamaran side business by selling a catamaran to Cleveland and goes on to speak at a nurses' convention as an uninvited motivational speaker, while Stewie and the millennials' children are left in the apartment's swimming pool without adult supervision and the millennials' kids drown, with Stewie as the sole survivor.
367	18	"Meg Goes to College"	Joseph Lee	Mike Desilets	May 2, 2021	KACX16	1.14
Out of a desire to be spoiled in their golden years, Peter and Lois fake an application to get Meg into Brown University. Peter joins her on campus and while annoying her with his antics, he accidentally lets the truth slip out. Meg strives to prove she can do everything on the false application but ends up failing the last challenge: windsurfing over Providence Falls. Meanwhile, Brian finds that he cannot catch squirrels as well as he used to, so Stewie offers to get him in shape, but his coaching proves ineffective. Doug steps in as his replacement, but despite doing a better job, Brian fires him when he sees how upset working with Doug made Stewie. Brian then decides that working out is not for him.
368	19	"Family Cat"	Julius Wu	Artie Johann	May 9, 2021	KACX17	1.34
Peter, Quagmire, Cleveland, and Joe start their own failed HGTV show, resulting in a gaping hole in the Griffins' house that entices a cat to enter. The cat named Pouncy (Tracie Thoms) takes a liking to Meg. While the family approves of her adoption, Brian is suspicious about her motives. Quagmire is the only one who believes him since cats took over his life. His suspicions are proven true when Pouncy reveals she can talk and discloses her plan to turn Meg into a crazy cat lady. Brian attempts to warn the others, but no one takes him seriously, especially Meg who claims that having Pouncy around is a bright spot in her miserable life. However, she is soon proven wrong. Brian sets out to rescue Meg, fighting off an army of cats. Just before Pouncy's scheme can succeed, Quagmire intervenes and sacrifices himself to be their cat lady instead as he does a version of the closing number for Cats. Afterward, Brian promises to be a better dog for Meg.
369	20	"Tales of Former Sports Glory"	Joe Vaux & Peter Shin	Mark Hentemann	May 16, 2021	KACX04	1.16
At The Drunken Clam, Jerome mentions that the cable is down, which prevents the guys from watching sports. As a result of the cable being out, the bar TV only picks up local channels. The guys then decides to make up some "sports-related" stories of their own to pass the time.: Cleveland discloses his past as a Cuban baseball player who flees to the free world and joins the Toronto Blue Jays, only to have a violent reaction to the Canadian weather.; Quagmire tells of being a tennis prodigy from New York, who finds success in the 70s, only for his career to dip afterward, ultimately ending in 2001.; Spoofing Rocky, Peter explains how he was a wannabe Italian boxer from Philadelphia, who passes away in a vat of cream cheese after winning the championship.; In the end, Joe disputes the validity of the stories and briefly mentions his experience with competitive aerobics.

== Production ==
=== Casting ===
On June 26, 2020, in the wake of protests following the murder of George Floyd, Mike Henry announced that he would no longer voice the African American character Cleveland Brown. Actor Wendell Pierce launched a campaign to become Mike Henry's replacement. It was later announced on September 25, 2020 that actor and YouTube personality Arif Zahir, who is known for voicing Cleveland in several fan videos, would be the new voice for the character. This makes Season 19 the final season in which Cleveland Brown is voiced by Mike Henry.

=== Release ===
The season premiered on September 27, 2020, airing on Sundays as part of Fox's Animation Domination programming block, along with The Simpsons, Bless the Harts, Bob's Burgers, and The Great North.

The season premiered on ITV2 in the UK on October 26, 2020.

The season is available to stream internationally in the UK, Australia and Canada on Disney+'s Star hub.
