= Family Guy season 21 =

Season of television series

Family Guy
- Season 21
- Digital purchase image
- Showrunners: Richard Appel; Alec Sulkin
- Starring: Seth MacFarlane; Alex Borstein; Seth Green; Mila Kunis; Mike Henry; Patrick Warburton; Arif Zahir
- No. of episodes: 20

Release
- Original network: Fox
- Original release: September 25, 2022 – May 7, 2023

Season chronology
- ← Previous; Season 20 Next → Season 22

The twenty-first season of the American animated television series Family Guy aired on Fox from September 25, 2022, to May 7, 2023. This season also featured the series' 400th episode.

The series follows the dysfunctional Griffin family, consisting of father Peter, mother Lois, daughter Meg, son Chris, baby Stewie, and the family dog Brian, who reside in their hometown of Quahog, Rhode Island.

Season twenty-one premiered the run of the twentieth production season, which is executive produced by Seth MacFarlane, Alec Sulkin, Richard Appel, Steve Callaghan, Danny Smith, Kara Vallow, Mark Hentemann, Tom Devanney, and Patrick Meighan. Sulkin and Appel returned as the series' showrunners. The season premiered on ITV2 (UK) on August 7, 2023.

The milestone 400th episode ("Get Stewie") was actually pitched by Seth MacFarlane himself.

== Voice cast and characters ==
- Seth MacFarlane as Peter Griffin, Brian Griffin, Stewie Griffin, Glenn Quagmire, Tom Tucker, Carter Pewterschmidt, Dr. Hartman, Seamus
- Alex Borstein as Lois Griffin, Barbara "Babs" Pewterschmidt, Elle Hitler
- Seth Green as Chris Griffin
- Mila Kunis as Meg Griffin
- Mike Henry as John Herbert
- Patrick Warburton as Joe Swanson
- Arif Zahir as Cleveland Brown

=== Supporting characters ===
- Johnny Brennan as Mort Goldman
- Gary Cole as Principal Shepherd
- Sam Elliott as Mayor Wild West
- Sanaa Lathan as Donna Tubbs-Brown
- Rachael MacFarlane as Miss Tammy
- Peter Macon as Preston Lloyd
- Marlee Matlin as Stella
- Chris Parnell as Doug
- Kevin Michael Richardson as Jerome
- Jennifer Tilly as Bonnie Swanson

== Episodes ==
| No. overall | No. in season | Title | Directed by | Written by | Original release date | Prod. code | U.S. viewers (millions) |
|---|---|---|---|---|---|---|---|
| 390 | 1 | "Oscars Guy" | Greg Colton | Damien Fahey | September 25, 2022 | LACX18 | 1.57 |
Nearing the night of the Oscars, Peter decides to pay homage to three different Oscar-winning stories, picking each one by spinning a roulette: The Silence of the Lambs – Clarice Starling (Lois) is tasked by Jack Crawford (Joe) with tracking down a serial killer named Buffalo Bill (Chris) in order to earn a spot at the FBI. When at a prison, she gets some consultation from the imprisoned Hannibal Lecter (Stewie) after being taken there by Frederick Chilton (Brian) where one of his demands is for Mario Lopez to record his answering machine. Once she is gone, Hannibal kills a guard and escapes. After Clarice slays Buffalo Bill and rescues his captive (Meg), Hannibal telephones Clarice. While he doesn't plan on pursuing Clarice, Hannibal asks her to return a favor which she is unable to do. He ends his call by stating that he's having an old friend "over for dinner" as he sees Frederick get off an airplane.; American Beauty – Lester Burnham (Peter) harbors a crush on his daughter's cheerleading friend, in the midst of learning that his wife is cheating on him and having to switch jobs. His new neighbor (Joe) believes Lester to be gay after seeing what appears to be his son giving him oral sex, he makes an advance but is rejected. Lester is subsequently shot by the neighbor, just before he can get with the cheerleader.; Forrest Gump – Forrest Gump (Peter) recalls playing college football and fighting in the Vietnam War, before opening a squid boat and reuniting with childhood friend Jenny (Lois), who won't marry him. Forrest runs nonstop for years, before meeting Jenny again and getting to meet their son (Stewie) before she dies.
| 391 | 2 | "Bend or Blockbuster" | John Holmquist | Artie Johann | October 2, 2022 | LACX19 | 1.12 |
Jealous after seeing the Tubbs-Brown family enjoying each other's company, Lois tries to get her family to spend the day together, but all her attempts fail. Peter suggests renting a movie from Blockbuster, but with the local branch closed, he decides to visit the last one in existence, bringing his reluctant family along for the road trip to Bend, Oregon. The Griffins arrive, but Peter is barred from renting any of the movies by the clerk due to the immense late fee for his copy of Ladyhawke which Peter does not have the money to pay. They attempt to flee with the armed Blockbuster clerk and his co-worker (Haley Joel Osment) on their tail, briefly escaping into the forest and taking refuge in an abandoned cabin in the woods. As the two Blockbuster employees corner them and prepare to shoot them, Peter admits his idea was dumb, but his children don't mind as they reveal that they always enjoy his shenanigans. Just before the family can get shot, a group of Amazon delivery drones arrive to fight off the Blockbuster employees and carry the Griffins home. Back at the house, Chris reveals that he ordered Sliver for the family to watch, but Peter realizes that they don't have the right cables to plug in their VCR. Loading a shotgun, Lois suggests visiting the last Circuit City in St. Augustine, Florida, to obtain the cables, unaware of Jeff Bezos spying on them through their Alexa.
| 392 | 3 | "A Wife-Changing Experience" | Steve Robertson | Steve Callaghan | October 9, 2022 | LACX20 | 1.49 |
At a pool party for their wedding anniversary, Peter and Lois are gifted a Range Rover from Carter, only to find that he mistakenly bought the miniature model aimed at children. Lois accepts the gift anyway, but while she is changing out of her swimsuit, Joe accidentally walks in on her and sees her naked. When Bonnie details her rekindled sex life the next day, Lois suspects that Joe was only able to perform well because he was thinking of her, but decides to keep seducing him anyway in hopes of bettering his marriage. Meanwhile, Stewie grows to love his mini Range Rover and adopts a new lifestyle to go with it. However, he discovers how much of a hassle taking care of a car is after Brian vomits on it. Stewie ultimately decides to get rid of the car after seeing another kid enjoying his big wheel and almost killing Rupert in a crash. After Quagmire rats her out, Lois confesses that part of why she is doing this is because she feels ignored by Peter, who admits that being married to her for so long has made her less exciting. After Joe tells her to stop seducing him, Lois decides to give some elderly veterans a show instead, but gets arrested alongside Peter, who tried to get back at her. The two decide that they would rather be bored with each other than with anyone else and start to incorporate more roleplay into their sex life where it was shown that Principal Shepherd was also arrested.
| 393 | 4 | "The Munchurian Candidate" | Joe Vaux | Mike Desilets | October 16, 2022 | MACX05 | 1.01 |
While at lunch with Bonnie, Elle, and Donna, Lois recollects her date with Peter the previous night, but expresses disappointment in the fact that he did not "go to Australia" with her afterwards. With help from a therapist (Naomi Ekperigin), they decide to hypnotize Peter into satisfying Lois, accidentally selecting the Extra jingle as his trigger phrase. It works nonetheless, prompting Lois to use it as often as she wants in order to keep her mood and marriage happy. However, the two later humiliate themselves at Pewterschmidt Manor when Peter hears the jingle through the TV while delivering a plate to an ailing Barbara, prompting him to perform oral sex on her instead. Upon getting home, Lois allows Peter to throw up in the trash, only to see Meg watching Extra as the jingle triggers him again. Meanwhile, Stewie has a modern treehouse built in the backyard, but feels insulted when he learns that Brian and Chris feigned being impressed by it. He renovates the home into a man cave, but it turns out that Brian and Chris do not like this either. Vowing revenge, Stewie force-feeds them dry Costco quiches and almost kills them with a crossbow, but they manage to escape with more fake flattery aimed at the weapon's craftsmanship. Stewie ultimately shoots them with a crossbow as payback, before shooting himself after seeing Meg topless.
| 394 | 5 | "Unzipped Code" | Julius Wu | Matt McElaney & Matt Pabian | October 23, 2022 | MACX06 | 1.42 |
When a sex-related injury leaves Jerome bound to a wheelchair, Peter and the guys decide to raise money for his restorative surgery by shooting a sexy men-in-uniform calendar. While the plan is a success, everyone discovers that Cleveland accidentally exposed a testicle while posing, which gets him fired as a mailman. Peter takes Cleveland to work where his expertise with the local roadmaps convinces Preston Lloyd to offer him a delivery job at the Pawtucket Brewery. While dealing with his friend's incompetence on the job, Cleveland soon manages to earn a promotion while Peter gets demoted to kitchen banter, much to his ire. After being upstaged at a neighborhood party, Peter tries to sabotage Cleveland by sneaking a rat into the main beer tank, but his plan fails and gets him fired by Preston. Cleveland vouches for him, claiming that every workplace needs some mediocre employees. Preston agrees not to fire Peter and offers Cleveland a promotion, which he refuses. While Peter receives the promotion, Cleveland goes back to his old job only for the postmaster to reveal that a reinstatement form had been sent a week prior since all firings have to be approved by the "union head". Cleveland tries and fails to bind his testicle with a rubber band in order to avoid a repeat of the incident. In the final scene, Peter congratulates Cleveland for getting his job back as Peter goes to take a selfie with Mort.
| 395 | 6 | "Happy Holo-ween" | Joseph Lee | Evan Waite | October 30, 2022 | MACX03 | 1.53 |
While at the Halloween Carnival with his family and friends, Peter stumbles across the owner of a hologram-themed attraction, who shows off a device that can create interactive holograms. After bribing the inventor, Peter decides to make a hologram based on the best version of himself to get out of menial tasks. While he enjoys this at first, he grows jealous after seeing his hologram kiss Lois. The hologram agrees to disappear after being confronted, but turns on his creator and vows to take his family for his own while keeping him trapped in the basement. Lois soon discovers that this new Peter is a fake after noticing his unusual behavior, but she and the children are trapped by him when they try to escape as holographic Peter has the car keys. The two Peters brawl with Hologram Peter ultimately vanishing after Stewie creates an electric current via static. After reconciling with his family, Peter later suggests they spend time together only for Lois to suspect that he made another hologram. Stewie then starts to make another electric current.
| 396 | 7 | "The Stewaway" | Mike Kim | Travis Bowe | November 13, 2022 | MACX07 | 1.58 |
During a fundraiser at his daycare, Stewie is introduced to Hide-and-seek and becomes addicted to it. Peter and Lois successfully bid on tickets to Vermont which they win from the auctioneer (Toks Olagundoye) where Lois intends to break Bonnie's Instagram like record. During one of many attempts to play it with Brian, he hides in Quagmire's suitcase and is accidentally brought to Paris, France. Quagmire agrees to babysit him after being guilt-tripped by Lois, and the two end up getting along, only to have a drunken night on the town as Stewie wanders off to chase Madeline. After several failed attempts in Vermont, Lois ends up falling off a cliff while trying to take a scenic photo when the cliff breaks away and had to be airlifted to the nearest hospital. Quagmire calls Brian over to help find him, ultimately finding him lost in a graveyard. Brian humors him by saying he was too good at hide-and-seek and the three head off to enjoy Paris together. As Lois recuperates at the hospital, she states that no record is worth injuring herself over. Peter discovers that the picture of Lois's broken leg managed to break Bonnie's record after all, much to her glee.
| 397 | 8 | "Get Stewie" | Jerry Langford | Artie Johann | November 20, 2022 | MACX01 | 1.19 |
Stewie becomes a fan of Mary Elizabeth Becca Ryan (Emmy Raver-Lampman), a young pop star who used to be on his favorite show Jolly Farm to Brian's annoyance. While at her concert, he posts a viral live tweet that she construes as an insult, resulting in her fanbase harassing him for days on end, even to the point of getting Rupert killed. Meanwhile, Peter finds himself easily fatigued due to his weight, and after refusing to lose weight traditionally, Dr. Hartman suggests he get Lap band surgery, which leaves him with lots of excess skin. He decides to take advantage of his new body by spending more time away from the house, which disappoints Lois, who hoped that his weight loss would help him more easily bond with Chris. Peter ultimately helps his son win the science fair by acting as a human kite, only to be zapped by lightning and reverted back to normal. Stewie decides to confront Mary in person before she leaves her handprint at the Quahog Walk of Fame, only to find that she has already gotten over his comment and barely remembers it. Likewise, his speech falls on deaf ears among her fans. However, he finds solace in the fact that Brian fixed Rupert for him.
| 398 | 9 | "Carny Knowledge" | Brian Iles | Steve Callaghan | December 4, 2022 | MACX04 | 1.04 |
During a "Generation Gap" game at the Quahog Fall Festival, Peter and Chris discover that they do not know much about each other. Lois orders them to hang out more, and they quickly bond over making fun of her habits, eventually gaining control of the household by outvoting her. At the advice of Bonnie and Donna, Lois fakes a series of essays and voicemails to make them bicker. Peter and Chris catch on and vow revenge by threatening to destroy Lois's piano. After being called out on her hypocrisy, Lois admits that her payback was mostly rooted in her hurt feelings, but Peter refuses to forgive her until she gets a Mark Davis haircut, which she previously tricked him into doing. Meanwhile, Brian falls for a carny named Amber (Nicole Sullivan). He assumes this relationship will be perfect because it will only last three days and consist of nothing but sex. However, Amber breaks up with him due to them having nothing in common. With his ego wounded, Brian strives to get her back just so he can be the one to call it off, but is threatened into staying with her by her shrewd Uncle Earl. Following an implied "rough week", Brian comes home, only to get crushed by the piano that Peter forgot to unrig. The final scene has Peter leaving Lois to find the killer whale that "killed his father". In a twist ending, the events of the episode are revealed to be part of a screenplay that Seamus wrote and quickly gains fame for.
| 399 | 10 | "The Candidate" | John Holmquist | Mark Hentemann | December 11, 2022 | MACX08 | 1.44 |
Peter, Quagmire, Cleveland, and Joe discover a Bird scooter outside The Drunken Clam and go for a joyride all the way down the East Coast. When reports of their disappearance reach Mayor Wild West, he sets out to rescue them where he manages to save them from an alligator attack off the coast of Florida. Inspired by Mayor West's heroism, Stewie decides to get into politics too, starting with the "snack captain" race at his school, which Doug is also running for. Things get ugly as Doug viciously attacks Stewie, whose counterattacks are repeatedly drowned out by global events, and surges in the polls even after defecating during their debate. Stewie and Brian look for dirt on Doug where they discover that he still uses a binky, but Doug counters this by suggesting that Stewie is an accident. After Brian notes how plausible the theory is, Stewie repeatedly tries and fails to make his parents fess up. After previously defecting from his campaign and feeding Doug the misinformation, Chris shows Stewie his secret porn stash, containing footage of Peter and Lois conceiving him. Stewie discovers that he was only half of an accident (Lois wanted another child but Peter did not) and ends up winning the race, not just because of the scandal making him more relatable, but also due to Doug dying in a plane crash on Election Day.
| 400 | 11 | "Love Story Guy" | Steve Robertson | Patrick Meighan | January 8, 2023 | MACX02 | 1.24 |
Arriving late at The Drunken Clam, Peter explains to the guys a sad story about Chris recently having to break up with his first love. This prompts the guys to recall their own first love experiences.: Spoofing Cast Away, Quagmire envisions himself as a FedEx delivery guy who is engaged to Helen Hunt. Three days before their wedding, he crash lands on a deserted island after his plane is hit by lightning, and starts to go insane after being stranded for four years. Alongside his friend, a volleyball named after Rita Wilson, Quagmire braves another storm and even Somali pirates from Captain Phillips in order to arrive back home, only to discover that Helen has moved on and married Paul Reiser. A heartbroken Quagmire walks off into the rain, but gets over the breakup after discovering portable porn.; Parodying Dirty Dancing, Joe recalls being a dance instructor at a camp, who catches the eye of Jennifer Schnozz; he ends up recruiting her as his new partner after Dancy McGee comes down with TMJ and has to undergo an illegal jaw surgery. Despite falling in love, Joe and Jennifer are barred form seeing each other by Dr. Hartman after he blames Joe for Dancy's botched surgery. Nonetheless, Joe stands up to him and dances with Jennifer at the camp talent show, but not before she too has to get a jaw surgery after he gets her pregnant.; Peter thinks back to 1989 where he falls in love with Meg Ryan after seeing her in When Harry Met Sally.... After seeing more of her movies, he bears witness to Ryan breaking the fourth wall and yanking him into the screen. Upon becoming friends, Peter follows her through many of her iconic movies and shows, taking up the roles of various male characters, before they profess their love during In the Cut. However, the whole story turns out to be a dream as Peter has just fallen asleep in the theater while masturbating.; Back in the present, Cleveland asks if he can tell his own first love story after being pressured to by Donna. When Peter won't let him, the guys instead try to pretend he's telling the story, but Donna does not buy it as she doesn't see the flashback effects.
| 401 | 12 | "Old West" | Greg Colton | Artie Johann | February 19, 2023 | MACX10 | 1.07 |
For Father's Day, Peter is sent out on a scavenger hunt alongside Joe, Cleveland, and Quagmire that is supervised by Principal Shepherd. After finding clues at Goodwill and even at Ernie the Giant Chicken's mansion, the hunt leads them to Wild West's ranch, where they find him preparing for a western showdown with his absentee father Old West (Gerald McRaney) as he does every year. Old West soon arrives to make amends, but his son refuses to hear him out, angry at how he walked out on him as a child. While camping out in the Griffins' backyard, he details his backstory in which he tried to clean up his outlaw reputation for the sake of his son, but had no luck and reverted back to crime after a failed America's Got Talent audition. Peter tries to help him become a better dad by changing his getup and letting him offer dating advice to Chris, but Wild still won't listen and calls for his father's arrest. Alongside the others and Wild's stepfather Allen (Tony Hale), Peter breaks him out, using a Trojan Horse version of Harry Bosch to distract Joe, and bring him back to the ranch one last time. Old confesses that the real reason why he left his son was to ensure he would not grow up to be like him. Wild forgives his father, but never wants to see him again. Old West rides off for good to meet his other son, who plans to shoot him on Independence Day.
| 402 | 13 | "Single White Dad" | Jerry Langford | Artie Johann | February 26, 2023 | MACX11 | 0.94 |
Peter attempts to bond with Chris over a game of Donkey Kong, but the latter offers to spice it up by reenacting the game, building its levels over the front of the house. Their escapade ends up breaking Lois's foot with a rolling water jug, forcing Peter to raise his children without her for a week. His initial attempts at solo parenting yield mixed results, but he is soon noticed by the public who mistake him for a single parent and laud him for his efforts. Peter decides to pretend that Lois is dead so he can revel in the perks of this, eventually becoming a local celebrity. This catches the attention of a single mother named Becky who offers him and Stewie to have regular playdates at her place. She soon falls for him as he reminds him of her late husband Scott, who nobody wants to hear about, and kisses him. After seeking his pals' advice, Peter decides to break things off before Lois finds out, but Becky invites herself over for dinner. Peter spends the whole evening trying to keep the two women from meeting, but after a series of shenanigans involving Bonnie, a prowler looking for Meg, and even Timothy Q. Mouse (Jay Pharoah), he fails at the task. While both are upset that he lied, Peter admits to his motivation behind it and states that he's proud to have a mother to help raise his kids. Lois suggests that Becky can do so much better than him anyway, to which she agrees, but she ends up leaving in a huff after nobody will let her tell Scott's story for the third time.
| 403 | 14 | "White Meg Can't Jump" | Joe Vaux | Emily Towers | March 5, 2023 | MACX09 | 0.85 |
While at lunch after Meg shoves past the other students to nab her preferred slice of pizza, she gets noticed by Principal Shepherd who is coaching the girls' basketball team and offers her to try out. When she succeeds at the tryouts but not during practice, Quagmire points out that Peter's belittling is what motivated her to play at her best, so Peter agrees to insult her from the stands at every game. Meanwhile, Stewie discovers several baby-centric conspiracy videos on YouTube, including one that tells him the real reason behind nap time. When it turns out to be correct, he falls further down the rabbit hole, eventually discovering that Lois's "the floor is lava" trick is just a ploy to keep him away while she is sleeping with Peter. The sight of his parents having sex traumatizes him so much that he develops multiple personalities: Mrs. Padberry-Wilkerson, Boone, Kermit the Frog, The Jace Man, Rick, and Gilbert Gottfried. During one of the later games, Peter loses his voice and almost costs Meg the passage to the championship, with her only making it due to the other team getting disqualified for having Gilbert Gottfried as a player. When Brian fails to help Stewie out on his own, he takes him to Bruce where the personas start to butt heads in an attempt to work things out. Brian eventually calms Stewie down by telling him that his parents were not actually having sex, before telling him that the white lies his parents tell him are actually for his own good. With some provocation from Meg and despite Dr. Hartman's warnings, Peter insults her one last time, although her championship victory results in no more than a picture on the wall at Applebee's. Note: This episode was dedicated in memory of Gilbert Gottfried, who posthumously guest-starred in the episode.
| 404 | 15 | "Adoptation" | Julius Wu | Mark Hentemann | March 12, 2023 | MACX13 | 1.05 |
After one of Carter's ships spills oil into the Gulf of Mexico, he strives to rebuild his image per the suggestion of his PR people. As Lois will not let him blame Peter for the incident, he decides to take a photo-op with an orphan girl named Tatum, but quickly grows to enjoy her company and decides to take her in. This upsets Lois, knowing how poorly he raised her, and she only becomes more jealous when she realizes how well Tatum is being taken care of. Her jealousy peaks after he takes everyone to the Newport Zoo--something he failed to do when she was a kid--where she ends up losing track of Tatum. Following a shenanigan-filled search, the Griffins find her trapped inside the gorilla exhibit as a rescue worker is killed trying to get her out. Taking the blame for the situation, Lois climbs in and manages to drive the gorillas away by rambling about her bizarre dreams (foreshadowed in the cold open), before apologizing to Carter for her behavior. Carter explains that he knows he was not the best father, and just wants to make up for his past mistakes. However, this turns out to be short-lived by the final scene as he decides that Tatum must leave since he is unable to hear her during dinner at his lengthy table. Peter is shown outside on a giraffe who states that Carter's table is too long.
| 405 | 16 | "The Bird Reich" | Joseph Lee | Julius Sharpe | April 16, 2023 | MACX12 | 0.86 |
When Stella's cat dies, Preston informs Peter about his new bereavement leave policy, which would grant him six weeks off in the event that he loses a pet. After a failed attempt to kill Brian by cutting his Prius' brakes, Peter takes in an eighty-year-old, German-speaking scarlet macaw, whom he names Gonzo after the Muppet of the same name. Despite everyone warming up to him, Joe soon discovers that Gonzo used to belong to Adolf Hitler, making Peter a Nazi by association. Meanwhile, Brian self-publishes a book called Chasing My TALE and gives Stewie an autographed copy, which he soon finds in a Little Free Library. Hurt that even his own best friend will not support his dreams, Brian swears off writing for good, but after seeing the slump he has fallen into, Stewie and Chris decide to make it up to him by boosting his book's sales through Amazon. While this initially works, Brian is angered again when Lois unintentionally reveals what they did. Stewie admits that he got rid of the book because he was jealous of Brian's accomplishment. The two reconcile, with Brian deciding not to do anything big ever again. Lois calls Animal Control to get Gonzo taken away, but Peter flees to seek guidance from Rabbi Goldstein (Richard Kind). When Gonzo recites some Torah scriptures, the two realize that he is actually Jewish and was just faking his Nazism to survive the Holocaust. They celebrate the revelation with matzo, but Gonzo chokes to death on his piece. The family holds Gonzo's funeral in the bathroom only to overflow the toilet when Peter attempts to flush his corpse.
| 406 | 17 | "A Bottle Episode" | Mike Kim | Artie Johann | April 16, 2023 | MACX14 | 0.92 |
Following a relaxing family vacation in Nantucket, Lois discovers that she has been banned from the Airbnb app due to a poor review, citing a stolen object. When everyone else says they stole nothing, Lois eventually finds out through Dottie (Casey Wilson), the house's owner, that she mistakenly stole a fancy shampoo bottle. After being belittled by her family and even Joe and Bonnie, Lois decides to return the shampoo in person, but Dottie refuses to change her review. Angered, Lois stakes out her house and discovers that her weakness is DoorDash. After applying to become one of the island's two drivers, Lois threatens to leave a negative review of her own, blackmailing Dottie into changing hers. She then tells her off about the dangers of letting strangers stay in her home. Meanwhile, Stewie and Brian discover saltwater taffy during their trip and decide to buy it in bulk, selling it door-to-door back in Quahog. Aside from Bruce, no one seems interested in purchasing their product, so they decide to rebrand it as something else. Eventually, the two promote it as a COVID-19 cure through Joe Rogan and sell it at Donald Trump rallies under the name "ChewAnon."
| 407 | 18 | "Vat Man and Rob 'Em" | Brian Iles | Damien Fahey | April 23, 2023 | MACX15 | 0.90 |
Following the retirement of the Pawtucket Brewery's night watchman, Moses Beauford (Jay Pharoah), Peter signs up to take his place. After a drunk Principal Shepherd bribes him with cash to let him and his fellow principals steal some beer, Peter decides to turn the brewery into an after-hours bar with Joe, Quagmire, and Cleveland helping him run it. Eventually, Peter and the guys discover that they have used up all of the stored beer. Moses returns, offering to help them replace it by robbing a beer truck belonging to a rival brewery, but after the heist is botched, Peter decides to confess, but Preston does not know what he is talking about. Moses reveals that he refilled all the vats with all the beers he stole over the many years at his old job as he plans to come out of retirement. Meanwhile, Stewie and Brian find a Lost Dog flyer, promising a $1,000 reward. Noticing how similar the missing dog, Rover, looks to Brian, the two decide to disguise him and swipe the money, but this backfires when the owner turns out to be an extreme TikToker named Chase (Karan Brar), who killed all of his previous dogs in viral stunts. Brian is crated before he can escape and is tied to a drone over the ocean as part of a sexual lubricant ad. The drone loses control after Chris pounces on Chase, but Stewie and Brian survive by landing in a kiddie pool filled with the lube.
| 408 | 19 | "From Russia with Love" | John Holmquist | Polina Diaz | April 30, 2023 | MACX16 | 0.94 |
After Brian applies for verification on Instagram, Stewie notes that his check mark is green, not blue, showing that he has been hacked. Meg is able to track the hacker to Chelyabinsk, Russia, and the trio locate him, a struggling man named Ivan, who reveals that he only hijacked Brian's account so he could live a good American life vicariously through him. He agrees to undo his actions, but also makes moves on Meg during her stay. Meg decides to stay with him after realizing that her weird body is considered very attractive in Russian society, but contracts rinderpest soon after. Meanwhile, Peter and Lois are invited on a double-date with Quagmire and his new girlfriend Stephanie (Martha Plimpton), Lois' middle school bully who once startled her into the water at a pool party, which Lois misconstrued as getting pushed in. Reminded of her childhood trauma, Lois soon finds her body reverting to its awkward teenage form and is diagnosed with Severe Nerd Damage by Dr. Hartman. Later at Joe's pool party, Stephanie accidentally knocks Lois into the pool while playing catch with Peter. Lois is convinced that her bully has not changed, but Stephanie says that both incidents were accidental and that she never bullied her, but rather saw Lois as an inspiration. She then reveals her new children's foundation for scoliosis victims, named "Scoli-Lois" in Lois' honor. The episode ends with Lois attempting to shed some more old baggage, only for Peter to threaten to kill himself when she tries to discuss their relationship.
| 409 | 20 | "Adult Education" | Steve Robertson | Matt Pabian | May 7, 2023 | MACX17 | 0.76 |
Picking up where the last episode left off as Brian's accounts are getting settled, Meg is enjoying her new life with Ivan in Russia, although she still misses some aspects of her old one. Following a near-death experience with the country's dissident laws made out by Vladimir Putin, Ivan proposes to her as he does not want to risk losing her again. The two are wed, but Meg expresses sadness at her family missing the wedding, so Ivan suggests a visit to America, giving her his phone to call them. Meg overhears him gloating to the bartender about using her for a green card marriage. Meg gets back at him by framing him for criticizing Russia's culture and Putin via Twitter, getting him poison darted by Russian soldiers as she walks out and throws his phone into the snow as she heads back to Quahog. Meanwhile, Lois sees that Chris does not appear in the Adam West High yearbook. She urges him to join an extracurricular, but none of the existing ones suit him. While on Pornhub, Chris discovers that some videos are shot at his school and interrogates Principal Shepherd about this after purposely getting sent to his office. They agree to shoot porn together in exchange for Chris getting his extracurricular credits. Lois soon discovers their scheme and reports it to the school board. There, Chris explains that the porn was only done to offset school budget cuts and that the experience helped him discover skills he didn't know he had. Nonetheless, he agrees to stop making porn in order to make Lois happy.

== Production ==
On September 23, 2020, Fox announced that Family Guy had been renewed for a twentieth and twenty-first season, ensuring that the series will last another two years. As revealed at Comic-Con 2022, Season 21 features guest stars like Mario Lopez, Gerald McRaney, Jay Pharoah, Martha Plimpton, and Casey Wilson. It also features the series' milestone 400th episode, "Love Story Guy", which aired on January 8, 2023; however, the episode "Get Stewie", which aired on November 20, was publicized as such. The season premiered on September 25, 2022, airing on Sundays as part of Fox's Animation Domination programming block, along with The Simpsons, Bob's Burgers, HouseBroken and The Great North.

=== Critical response ===
The season received mixed reviews from critics. On the review aggregator website Rotten Tomatoes, the season holds an approval rating of 59% based on 10 reviews, with an average rating of 3.5/5.
