= Family Guy season 17 =

Season of television series

Family Guy
- Season 17
- DVD cover
- Showrunners: Richard Appel; Alec Sulkin
- Starring: Seth MacFarlane; Alex Borstein; Seth Green; Mila Kunis; Mike Henry
- No. of episodes: 20

Release
- Original network: Fox
- Original release: September 30, 2018 – May 12, 2019

Season chronology
- ← Previous; Season 16 Next → Season 18

The seventeenth season of Family Guy aired on Fox in the United States from September 30, 2018, to May 12, 2019.

The series follows the dysfunctional Griffin family, consisting of father Peter, mother Lois, daughter Meg, son Chris, baby Stewie, and the family dog Brian, who reside in their hometown of Quahog. The season's executive producers are Seth MacFarlane, Alec Sulkin, Richard Appel, Steve Callaghan, Danny Smith, Kara Vallow, Mark Hentemann, Tom Devanney, Patrick Meighan and Cherry Chevapravatdumrong. The season's showrunners are Sulkin and Appel.

This season sees Brian trapped in a marriage with a dying woman (played by Casey Wilson) in a two-part arc ("Married... with Cancer", "Dead Dog Walking"), another two-part arc focused on Peter becoming a scaremongering news anchor, which lands him a job as President Trump's press secretary ("Hefty Shades of Gray", "Trump Guy"), Quagmire once again bonding with an estranged child who's biologically his ("No Giggity, No Doubt"), Meg qualifying for the Winter Olympics in Korea ("The Griffin Winter Games"), Brian and Stewie shrinking to microscopic size ("Big Trouble in Little Quahog"), Peter and Brian competing to become the next Pawtucket Brewery mascot (“Pawtucket Pete”), Meg becoming an Internet influencer ("Girl, Internetted"), Peter identifying as transgender ("Trans-Fat"), a meta episode where the Griffins record DVD commentary ("You Can't Handle the Booth!"), and Quagmire running against Brian for mayor ("Adam West High").

== Voice cast and characters ==
- Seth MacFarlane as Peter Griffin, Brian Griffin, Stewie Griffin, Glenn Quagmire, Tom Tucker, Carter Pewterschmidt, Dr. Elmer Hartman
- Alex Borstein as Lois Griffin, Barbara "Babs" Pewterschmidt, Tricia Takanawa
- Seth Green as Chris Griffin
- Mila Kunis as Meg Griffin
- Mike Henry as Cleveland Brown, John Herbert

=== Supporting characters ===
- Gary Cole as Principal Shepard
- Bryan Cranston as Bert
- Julie Hagerty as Carol Pewterschmidt-West
- Christine Lakin as Joyce Kinney
- Niecy Nash as Sheila
- Patrick Warburton as Joe Swanson
- Sanna Lathan as Donna Brown
- Jennifer Tilly as Bonnie Swanson
- Rachael MacFarlane as Miss Tammy

== Episodes ==
| No. overall | No. in season | Title | Directed by | Written by | Original release date | Prod. code | U.S. viewers (millions) |
|---|---|---|---|---|---|---|---|
| 310 | 1 | "Married... with Cancer" | Mike Kim | Aaron Lee | September 30, 2018 | HACX02 | 2.57 |
Brian falls in love with a woman named Jess Schlotz (Casey Wilson), who has cancer. He decides to marry her, but comes to regret his choice when they learn her cancer is in remission.
| 311 | 2 | "Dead Dog Walking" | Julius Wu | Chris Sheridan | October 7, 2018 | HACX03 | 2.69 |
Brian's marriage to Jess is not what he imagined, so at Peter's suggestion, Brian lets himself go. He becomes obese and develops hip dysplasia. Jess then announces that she is going to have Brian euthanized. Meanwhile, Chris and Stewie take up vaping after attending a party.
| 312 | 3 | "Pal Stewie" | Brian Iles | John Viener & Matt Pabian | October 14, 2018 | FACX18 | 1.99 |
Stewie's personality brightens when he befriends a boy his age named Hudson. He feels betrayed when he thinks Hudson has excluded him from his birthday party and returns to his dark side. Meanwhile, Peter learns to be more assertive after attending a Tony Robbins self-empowerment seminar with Lois.
| 313 | 4 | "Big Trouble in Little Quahog" | Joe Vaux | Dominic Bianchi & Joe Vaux | October 21, 2018 | FACX19 | 2.57 |
After being teased by Brian for his small stature, Stewie invents a shrinking machine to even the score. It backfires and both of them shrink to microscopic size. They befriend a group of water bears led by Vernon (Kyrie Irving) that includes a water bear version of Patrick Stewart. Meanwhile, Lois and Peter deal with a lonely exterminator.
| 314 | 5 | "Regarding Carter" | Greg Colton | Alex Carter | November 4, 2018 | HACX04 | 2.60 |
Lois gets an unexpected present from Carter for her birthday in the form of a gun, but an accident leaves him in the care of the Griffins while Barbara is away in Antarctica.
| 315 | 6 | "Stand by Meg" | Jerry Langford | Billy Domineau | November 11, 2018 | HACX05 | 2.29 |
After being saved from choking to death on a grape, Stewie attempts to help Meg with her life with the help of Brian. Meanwhile, Chris attends a vocational school at the suggestion of Principal Shepherd.
| 316 | 7 | "Griffin Winter Games" | Steve Robertson | Artie Johann | November 18, 2018 | HACX01 | 2.66 |
In an attempt to surprise the Griffin family, Meg successfully manages to get into the U.S. Olympic team as a biathlete and prepares for the Winter Games. Things, however, take a turn when Peter ends up in North Korea.
| 317 | 8 | "Con Heiress" | Brian Iles | Mark Hentemann | December 2, 2018 | HACX07 | 2.72 |
Stewie discovers that Brian is trying to win the affections of a wealthy widowed heiress and decides to help, only to discover Quagmire is running the same con. Meanwhile, Peter teaches Chris to mow lawns and is mistaken for another chubby child by Herbert, making Chris jealous.
| 318 | 9 | "Pawtucket Pete" | John Holmquist | Chris Regan | December 9, 2018 | FACX20 | 3.50 |
Following the death of his boss Angela (to coincide with the death of her voice actress Carrie Fisher), the Pawtucket Brewery gets two new bosses named Bert and Sheila, an interracial couple, who demote Peter to recycling. However, his luck changes when the bosses decide to make Peter the new face of Pawtucket Patriot Beer...and things go south when Brian the dog who started out as Peter's sidekick becomes more popular as the brewery's Spuds McKenzie-esque party dog.
| 319 | 10 | "Hefty Shades of Gray" | Joseph Lee | Mike Desilets | January 6, 2019 | HACX08 | 2.42 |
A ghost hunt gone wrong leads Peter to have white hair, which leads him to become a local news anchor who dishes out fake news and argues with Tom Tucker. Meanwhile, Brian and Stewie discover that Chris' lack of interest in girls is because he's addicted to online porn and teach him how to sexually fantasize without using the Internet.
| 320 | 11 | "Trump Guy" | Joe Vaux | Patrick Meighan | January 13, 2019 | HACX09 | 4.04 |
Continuing from the last episode, Peter's fake news career advances and he moves the family to Washington, D.C. to become Donald Trump's new White House Press Secretary. Things go south when Peter finds Donald sexually harassing Meg as she earlier claimed, following her encounter with Ivanka Trump.
| 321 | 12 | "Bri, Robot" | John Holmquist | Patrick Meighan | February 10, 2019 | HACX10 | 1.81 |
After celebrating his latest birthday, Brian becomes depressed knowing he has never had a chance to write his autobiography. Stewie offers his help, but instead decides to create a robot clone of Brian that mirrors everything he says and does. Meanwhile, a new massage parlor opens in Quahog and Peter wants in on the action until Peter learns that it's the front for a prostitution ring when Joe and the police raid it.
| 322 | 13 | "Trans-Fat" | Steve Robertson | Wellesley Wild | February 17, 2019 | HACX11 | 2.23 |
After using the transgender bathroom at a baseball game, Peter is mistaken for being transgender and begins dressing as a woman to reap several benefits at work due to Bert and Sheila supporting the transgender community. However, things get complicated after an incident at a low ceiling fan club knocks him into a coma and Bert and Sheila give him Sexual Reassignment Surgery. Ida Davis comes to Peter's rescue after his unsuccessful attempt at life as a woman.
| 323 | 14 | "Family Guy Lite" | Mike Kim | Anthony Blasucci | March 3, 2019 | HACX12 | 2.10 |
Peter takes the stairs at the Pawtucket Brewery upon not wanting to take the elevator with a man who has a mutual thing in common with him. After Joe fails to rescue him and Peter accidentally sets off the fire alarm, he gets reprimanded by Bert and Sheila for him being obese enough to not make it up the stairs and the water damage that he unintentionally caused. This causes Peter to turn to Quagmire for help in losing weight. Meanwhile, Brian reads something from Lois' creative writing club as he and Stewie suspect that Lois is having an affair with Horatio, a Stop & Shop worker, that matches the description of one of her story's characters.
| 324 | 15 | "No Giggity, No Doubt" | Julius Wu | Kevin Biggins | March 10, 2019 | HACX13 | 2.25 |
When the guys volunteer to chaperone the high school prom, Quagmire hits it off with a girl named Courtney (Mandy Moore) only to discover that she is his daughter after she says "Giggity" and Quagmire used his Emergency DNA Test kit to confirm it. To his and the gang's surprise, Quagmire makes a serious effort to embrace parenting Courtney, joining Peter and Meg on an ill-fated father-daughter camping trip. Note: This episode was dedicated to Luke Perry.
| 325 | 16 | "You Can't Handle the Booth!" | Greg Colton | Damien Fahey | March 24, 2019 | HACX14 | 2.01 |
The Griffins record a DVD commentary track for a Family Guy episode. Lois finds out that Peter was married previously to Sarah Paulson and that Chris might just be Philip Seymour Hoffman's son, not Peter's. Lois storms off, declaring their marriage over. The rest of the family are joined by Seth MacFarlane and the cast who reveal that they are all just fictional characters. Lois returns, and faced with a new reality that they don't really exist and they should make the best of what they have, patches things up with Peter and the kids.
| 326 | 17 | "Island Adventure" | Jerry Langford | Steve Callaghan | March 31, 2019 | HACX06 | 2.15 |
Stewie sets out for Garbage Island to recover his tricycle after Peter throws it away. Brian accompanies him on the trip and decides to stay when he discovers the leisurely island lifestyle.
| 327 | 18 | "Throw It Away" | Brian Iles | Cherry Chevapravatdumrong | April 28, 2019 | HACX15 | 1.95 |
Inspired by Tricia Takanawa's new book Throw It Away which she promotes on Joyce Kinney's show The Flow, Lois asks the family to toss things that don't make them happy. Eventually, she takes it to an extreme by kicking the entire family out and throws everything out, becoming depressed when she has nothing left.
| 328 | 19 | "Girl, Internetted" | Joe Vaux | Chris Regan | May 5, 2019 | HACX17 | 1.72 |
Peter takes the family to a screen con and influences Meg to become an internet celebrity. Meg becomes popular as "Refrigerator Meg", promoting a lifestyle of unhealthy food, and loses her legs to type 2 diabetes. Meanwhile, Brian falls asleep behind the wheel and crashes his Toyota Prius into another car. He is forced to drive around in a Hummer provided by the body shop owner (Denis Leary) with certain parts of this subplot narrated by Sam Elliott. When it's time to return the Hummer, Brian doesn't want to give it up because of the power he feels driving the car around.
| 329 | 20 | "Adam West High" | Joseph Lee | Artie Johann | May 12, 2019 | HACX16 | 1.78 |
After Mayor West's death (Note: Mayor West is based on and voiced by actor Adam West, who died in 2017. Following his death, the character was retired from the series.), Brian successfully petitions to rename James Woods High School to Adam West High. Now with Mayor West gone, the city of Quahog needs a new mayor. Brian decides to run, but Quagmire runs against him out of spite. Quagmire sabotages Brian's appearance during the mayoral debate. When Brian confronts him on his campaign bus, he accidentally knocks out the driver, and the two become trapped in the wreckage of the bus, which is left hanging over a cliff. They discuss their motivations for running for mayor before Brian attempts to climb out, causing the bus to fall. As he leaps out the back of the bus with Quagmire's arms wrapped around his waist, Brian sees the late Mayor West grabbing his arm. West winks at Brian, and when Brian looks up again, he is holding onto a branch. The election is cancelled following the incident. The episode ends with a tribute to Adam West.

== Home media ==
This is to date, the final Family Guy season to be released on DVD, and the first time to be produced by Walt Disney Studios Home Entertainment.
