= Family Guy season 18 =

Season of television series

Family Guy
- Season 18
- Digital purchase image
- Showrunners: Richard Appel; Alec Sulkin
- Starring: Seth MacFarlane; Alex Borstein; Seth Green; Mila Kunis; Mike Henry
- No. of episodes: 20

Release
- Original network: Fox
- Original release: September 29, 2019 – May 17, 2020

Season chronology
- ← Previous; Season 17 Next → Season 19

The eighteenth season of Family Guy was announced on February 12, 2019. It aired on Fox from September 29, 2019, to May 17, 2020.

The series follows the dysfunctional Griffin family, consisting of father Peter, mother Lois, daughter Meg, son Chris, baby Stewie, and family dog Brian, who reside in their hometown of Quahog. The season included a crossover with Beavis and Butt-Head, guest-starring Mike Judge reprising his roles as Beavis and Butt-Head.

In April 2020, the show joined the rest of Fox's Animation Domination lineup in a partnership with Caffeine for the AniDom Beyond Show, a recap show hosted by Andy Richter. The hour-long program featured interviews with guests and live interactivity with fans online, with recaps for the episodes that aired through April and May. The Family Guy episode aired on May 10, 2020, featuring Richard Appel, Seth Green, and Michael K Hunt. On May 18, 2020, John Viener joined the show with other writers from the Fox Animation Domination lineup.

Due to the debuts of freshman animated sitcoms Bless the Harts and Duncanville taking the 8:30 pm time slot, which bumped Bob's Burgers to 9:00 pm, the show moved to 9:30 pm.

The season's executive producers were Seth MacFarlane, Alec Sulkin, Richard Appel, Steve Callaghan, Danny Smith, Kara Vallow, Mark Hentemann, Tom Devanney, Patrick Meighan and Cherry Chevapravatdumrong. The season's showrunners were Sulkin and Appel.

The season aired in the UK from October 14, 2019, to June 1, 2020, on ITV2.

== 20th Anniversary ==
In February 2019, Fox released a trailer for Season 18, both acting as a teaser for the upcoming episodes, but also as a way of celebrating 20 years of the series. On April 15, 2019, TBS aired twenty episodes of the series, handpicked by Seth MacFarlane. A DVD compilation set containing 20 episodes, titled Family Guy's 20 Greatest Hits, was released on January 8, 2019.

== Voice cast and characters ==
- Seth MacFarlane as Peter Griffin, Brian Griffin, Stewie Griffin, Glenn Quagmire, Tom Tucker, Carter Pewterschmidt, Dr. Hartman, Seamus, Dan Quagmire/Ida Davis
- Alex Borstein as Lois Griffin, Barbara "Babs" Pewterschmidt, Tricia Takanawa
- Seth Green as Chris Griffin, Neil Goldman
- Mila Kunis as Meg Griffin
- Mike Henry as Cleveland Brown, Bruce

=== Supporting characters ===
- Gary Cole as Principal Shepard
- Bryan Cranston as Bert
- Martha MacIsaac as Patty
- Niecy Nash as Sheila
- Emily Osment as Ruth
- Patrick Warburton as Joe Swanson
- Lisa Wilhoit as Connie D'Amico

== Episodes ==
No. overall	No. in season	Title	Directed by	Written by	Original release date	Prod. code	U.S. viewers (millions)
330	1	"Yacht Rocky"	John Holmquist	Travis Bowe	September 29, 2019	HACX18	1.88
Peter's job announces that due to cutbacks they need to let one male employee go. When the final choice comes down to Peter and another employee, Peter blacks out from the stress. After he awakens in the hospital, Dr. Hartman connects him with a "yacht rock" music collection to help him relax. When the guys get hooked on the music as well, they learn of an upcoming Yacht Rock Cruise and decide to all go along. While attempting to board, Brian finds himself in a dog crate and stored beneath deck. On board, the rest of the family and Peter's friends rub shoulders with numerous stars. But when the ship's captain gets distracted hanging out with Peter, he leaves the bridge unattended as a rogue wave capsizes the ship. Struggling to survive, everyone has to make their way towards the bottom of the ship where the hull is the thinnest. When they finally reach their goal and meet up with Brian in the process, they realize that they have no tools to cut through the hull. Turning fearful as the water rises, the episode is resolved by simply cutting to everybody safely teleported back at home. Note: This episode is a parody of the film The Poseidon Adventure.
331	2	"Bri-Da"	Steve Robertson	Tom Devanney	October 6, 2019	HACX19	2.31
Hung over after a night out, Peter, Joe, Quagmire and Cleveland realize they had a brilliant, million-dollar idea but have no clue what it was. To make sure they don't lose any more million-dollar ideas while they're drunk, they all fit themselves with police-grade body cams. Reviewing the footage following another night out shows Peter, Joe and Cleveland pitching an idea on Shark Tank, whilst Quagmire is in bed with a random woman, but he is shocked when Joe reveals that all the footage from the cameras is already online. Meanwhile, Brian finds Quagmire's transgender father, Ida, in a hotel bar after she has seen the video, and the two end up spending the night together again, except this time they both decide to enter a relationship together, which Quagmire vehemently objects to. Despite Brian's efforts to show his seriousness and bond with him, Quagmire forces Ida to choose between either him or Brian in her life. Ida chooses her son, so she and Brian decide to end their relationship amicably, with fond memories of their time together.
332	3	"Absolutely Babulous"	Mike Kim	Mark Hentemann & Ted Jessup	October 13, 2019	HACX20	1.82
Stewie receives a medal in a race, but his gloating suddenly stops when Brian shows him that it is a participation award, and Stewie realizes that his entire collection of medals and trophies are ones he got for participating. In a fit of rage he accidentally burns the entire house down, forcing the family to temporarily move in with Carter and Babs. Determined to prove to himself he can earn a medal, Stewie decides to enter a pie-making contest but is disappointed when he comes in 5th. However, when Brian explains that he is one of a handful of participants taking home ribbons, he feels proud again. Meanwhile, Peter once again feels outcast when Lois reverts to her high-society roots around her father, and whilst hiding in a garage is shocked to learn from Babs that she is from a humble background as well. The two go on a drunken night out together, and in the morning Peter convinces her to live her life her own way, but this move results in her and Carter breaking up as she returns to her hometown. Peter must repair the damage he caused between Babs and Carter's relationship, but in order to do that he must get Carter disguised as a trucker and win her back from her old stomping grounds. When Carter gets into a fight, Babs saves him and admits that she no longer feels at home here, and wants to come back, repairing their relationship.
333	4	"Disney's The Reboot"	Greg Colton	Kirker Butler	October 20, 2019	JACX02	2.64
The Griffin Family oversee a focus group about possible reboots of Family Guy.: Lois! – A reboot of Family Guy with Lois as the lead character. In the pilot episode shown, Lois competes for a promotion at the brewery, where she works.; The Q – A reboot of Family Guy that changes the show into a teen supernatural drama, with Chris, Ruth, Patty and Neil as the lead characters. In the pilot episode, Meg is killed and the others must solve the mystery of her murder.; Family Guy Again – A reboot/spin-off of Family Guy starring only the most unpopular characters of the show, with Chris, Joe, and Tricia Takanawa as the leads.; After these three are shown, Peter comes in and tries to show more examples of reboots including a Netflix version of the show and a BoJack Horseman parody. In the end, Fox decides to keep Family Guy the way it is.
334	5	"Cat Fight"	Jerry Langford	Steve Callaghan	November 3, 2019	JACX03	1.61
In order to find a hobby beyond his sex life, Quagmire decides to open a cat cafe, titled "The Barista Cats", which enrages Brian, leading him to protest the cafe, and get it closed down, leading to the two fighting, but when Brian breaks his leg and Quagmire heals him, the two reconcile and Brian offers to be Quagmire's emotional-support dog. Meanwhile, Lois takes Chris and Meg to a Christian camp when they get in trouble at school.
335	6	"Peter & Lois' Wedding"	Joe Vaux	Mark Hentemann	November 10, 2019	JACX05	2.19
When the Wi-Fi goes out in the Griffin home, Peter and Lois tell the story of their marriage, leading to many parodies of the 1990s and all its glory. The story explains that Carter hired Daisy Fuentes to get Peter away from Lois, but Peter's love for Lois shines through and the two get married at Fenway Park.
336	7	"Heart Burn"	Steve Robertson	Matt Pabian & Matt McElaney	November 17, 2019	JACX10	1.92
On Lois and Peter's anniversary, the Griffins reenact three famous love stories: Helen of Troy, Romeo and Juliet, and Fatal Attraction.
337	8	"Shanksgiving"	Brian Iles	Alex Carter	November 24, 2019	JACX04	2.28
When he learns that Lois's special Thanksgiving dinner will be with her entire family, Peter gets himself, Quagmire, Joe, and Cleveland arrested to avoid it, spending the holiday in the local jail. After getting arrested by Police Superintendent Chalmers (the twin brother of Superintendent Chalmers), they end up in the state penitentiary due to overcrowding (because lots of people had the same idea). Unable to survive alone, the guys all join different prison gangs. The only prison gang that will let Peter join insists that he stab Cleveland as his initiation. Meanwhile, Stewie has to reveal a secret he has been keeping from everyone.
338	9	"Christmas Is Coming"	John Holmquist	Travis Bowe	December 15, 2019	JACX06	2.30
Meg takes Stewie to the local mall to see Santa Claus. As they sit on Santa's lap, Meg receives her first orgasm. Stewie becomes traumatized by Santa. Meg takes Stewie to different malls trying to recreate the experience, but she can't find the same Santa and the other ones don't give her the same feeling. Brian dresses up as Santa to help Stewie get over his fear. On Christmas Eve, Meg meets the real Santa who reinstates her belief in Christmas magic.
339	10	"Connie's Celica"	Joseph Lee	Kevin Biggins	January 5, 2020	JACX08	1.85
Lois gets a job as a substitute teacher at Adam West High and quickly runs afoul of Meg's unpleasant, mean girl classmate Connie D'amico. When Connie ends up expelled, she begins harassing and cyberbullying Lois, until Lois publicly threatens her. Lois then finds herself the prime suspect when Connie is reported to have been murdered in a car crash due to sabotaged brakes. Realizing that he would have to fend for himself, Peter sets out to prove her innocent only to fail. Joe later brings Lois home, revealing that Connie had staged her death by murdering Peppa Pig and putting the corpse in the car with a blonde wig on so it would fool the police.
340	11	"Short Cuts"	Julius Wu	Kirker Butler	February 16, 2020	JACX11	1.65
Brian considers getting neutered after reconnecting with an old friend who has become wealthy. Meanwhile, Peter draws the line after Lois gets a haircut that he hates.
341	12	"Undergrounded"	Greg Colton	Mike Desilets	February 23, 2020	JACX13	1.57
After running out of money for a round of drinks, Peter learns that Joe and Cleveland have secret credit cards hidden from their wives, so he gets one himself one only to get caught and ends up getting grounded by Lois. Desperate to get out, he digs a hole out of the house that leads to the Drunken Clam. When a cave-in occurs, trapping Peter, Quagmire, Cleveland, and Joe, Peter's only hope for their freedom is for Brian to sell him out to Lois. Whilst trapped thinking they are about to die, Peter reveals that Lois killed a woman (as mentioned before) but that he chose whom. A flashback to their honeymoon reveals that he chose the waitress who told him the chef would not make a chocolate-chip gumball pizza.
342	13	"Rich Old Stewie"	Brian Iles	Chris Sheridan	March 1, 2020	JACX12	1.55
Fifty years into the future, Stewie is rich and living in California when Brian brings word that Peter is dying. Traveling back home, they pick up Chris and Meg, who have also gone on with their lives. On arrival, Stewie is appalled at the condition of the house. The family meets Peter, who extracts a promise from Stewie to take care of the family. He rebuilds the house just in time before Peter passes away. But as he heads back home to California to share his money with the family after handing out a round of cigars to celebrate Peter's life, the latter recovers as the whole family shares a laugh over pulling a scam on him. However, he is aware of the ruse and had rigged the gas to stay on, blowing up the house behind him as Chris lights his cigar. As Brian begs him to put him out of his misery, Stewie suddenly realizes he is having a fantasy while trying to pick out a Halloween costume of an old man, having been afraid of growing old but now looking forward to it. After trying it on, he gets his dragging testicles tangled up with Herbert's. At the same shop in closing, Meg has a momentary fantasy of being Evita Perón, before Peter snaps her out of it to make her the back half of a farting horse, in which he insists on doing the farting.
343	14	"The Movement"	Joe Vaux	Maggie Mull	March 8, 2020	JACX15	1.45
Peter becomes a coach on Quahog's minor-league baseball team. Before one game, he falls to one knee when he is nearly overcome with diarrhea, but everyone assumes he is protesting police violence and makes him the face of racial justice in the U.S. Peter eventually admits that he didn't set out to protest but does care about confronting injustice, and steps down from his promotion to the club's manager—but not before he trades Meg to American Dad!, where she finds that Stan Smith and Roger don't want her there.
344	15	"Baby Stewie"	Jerry Langford	Artie Johann	March 15, 2020	JACX14	1.68
With Quagmire unable to drink due to medication, the guys take their families to an escape room, with Brian using Stewie to solve the problems then taking credit. Brian later shows Stewie a video showing Chris solving a Rubik's Cube, and explains he was smart as a baby but lost his intelligence when he hit puberty, as will Stewie. Stewie creates a machine to alter his DNA to prevent that, but it instead leaves him as an ordinary baby. Unable to cope, Brian tries to undo the process, which goes badly wrong, with Stewie getting rearranged and turning into a monster. Seeking guidance, Brian tries to watch Splice, but finds Peter has taped over it. Out of options, Brian time-travels back to just before Stewie finished the machine and explains it was a prank by playing Chris's video backwards, showing him eating the Rubik's Cube. As revenge, Stewie orders Brian to drown his future self to fix the timeline.
345	16	"Start Me Up"	John Holmquist	Daniel Peck	April 19, 2020	JACX16	1.58
When Stewie and Chris accompany Brian returning a keyboard to an electronics store, they end up destroying the place and leaving Brian with the bill. Inspired by Zach Braff, they decide to launch a kickstarter for a film, then balk and use the money to pay the bill. Unfortunately, a series of blunders results in them raising $1.5 million, forcing them to actually make the film. Meanwhile, due to Peter sweating in a room without air conditioning, his bosses tell him to work from home, causing Lois to become irritated even more.
346	17	"Coma Guy"	Steve Robertson	Patrick Meighan	April 26, 2020	JACX07	1.54
Peter is ordered by Lois to read a book after his failure to read affects her party. After accidentally being given Van Halen's album 1984 instead of Orwell's 1984, Peter becomes addicted to their music. When he races Ernie the Giant Chicken, he is distracted by a squirrel and crashes, ending up in a coma. Dr. Hartman tells Lois that Peter is brain-dead and gives her the option of turning off his life support. Inside his coma, Peter goes through a series of odd dreams and hallucinations (with one of them involving him reliving the frog gag from "Long John Peter", with the roles reversed) before ending up on a cruise ship full of dead characters. When he discovers the ship has no Wi-Fi, Peter quickly escapes the ship and comes out of his coma, awakening to Lois holding the plug to his life support in her hand, destroying his trust in her. But he decides to get over it and the family is back together by the end of the story.
347	18	"Better Off Meg"	Anthony Agrusa	Emily Towers	May 3, 2020	JACX17	1.39
When she doesn't realize that it's Cut Classes Day at the school and finds her family has taken a barrel wearing a Meg hat with them for a day of fun, Meg spends her birthday bowling alone. When Bruce gives her driving license to the wrong person, she is incorrectly reported as dead and discovers no one really cares that she is "gone". Meg decides to start a new life under the name Natalee Hallway. Later she wants to return and reveals the truth to Chris, but Chris has reasons to keep her off-stage.
348	19	"Holly Bibble"	Julius Wu	Cherry Chevapravatdumrong	May 10, 2020	JACX01	1.29
Staying at a motel during a hurricane, the Griffin family pass the time by reading the in-room Bible and telling three stories: "Adam and Eve", "Noah's Ark", and "The Last Supper".
349	20	"Movin' In (Principal Shepherd's Song)"	Joseph Lee	Danny Smith	May 17, 2020	JACX18	1.51
Principal Shepherd fat-shames Chris to the entire school after mistaking the loudspeaker microphone for an Alexa, and when Lois calls for action, the school board fires him. Discovering him living in his car, Lois and Peter invite him to stay with them, but he soon begins to make himself too well at home.
