= Arif Zahir =

American actor (born 1994)

- Born: Arif Zahir Lopes-Thrower; April 15, 1994 (age 32); Berkeley, California, U.S.
- Other names: Azerrz; 4rif
- Education: Hussian College (did not finish)
- Occupations: Actor; voice actor; musician; internet personality
- Years active: 2007–present

YouTube information
- Channels: Azerrz; 4rif
- Genres: Gaming; sketch comedy; comedy music
- Subscribers: 7.11 million (Azerrz); 186 thousand (4rif)
- Views: 827.4 million (Azerrz); 10 million (4rif)
- Musical career
- Genres: Hip-hop; comedy hip hop; pop; R&B; country; soul
- Last updated: June 14, 2025

Arif Zahir Lopes-Thrower (born April 15, 1994) is an American actor, voice actor, musician, and Internet personality. His YouTube channel, Azerrz, has over 7 million subscribers and features voice impressions of a plethora of celebrities and cartoon characters, one most notably being Cleveland Brown from the television series Family Guy. In 2021, Zahir became the official voice actor for Cleveland Brown, succeeding Mike Henry, who had voiced the character since 1999 before stepping down.

== Early life and education ==
Zahir is of African-American and Cape Verdean descent and was born on April 15, 1994, in Berkeley, California. He was partially raised in New Bedford, Massachusetts where he attended Nativity Preparatory School and Keith Middle School before moving back to California in 2007.

Zahir began doing voice impressions in middle school to impress his classmates. He originally made a YouTube channel in 2007 which focused on performing magic tricks. After doing so and finding success he started attending Hussian College's campus in Los Angeles. He later dropped out to spend more time focusing on his YouTube career.

== Career ==
Zahir created his YouTube channel in 2012 but posted his first video in 2013. He started out by posting comedic sketches, gaming videos, and videos of himself performing voice impressions of both cartoon characters and real celebrities. Zahir garnered initial success through his voice impressions which he started doing in 2011. One of the first voice impressions he did was of Cleveland Brown, whom he would go on to voice officially several years later.

Zahir landed his first acting role playing a character named Arif in the short film No One But Lydia. Starting in 2018, he became a recurring cast member on How It Should Have Ended voicing Black Panther / T'Challa. Through community challenges and his first viral hit with "Ted Plays Call of Duty" (which has over 20M+ views), Arif quickly grew his channel to over 6.5+ million subscribers and 650+ million views.

Zahir is also a musician, releasing music under the moniker 4rif. He released his debut album At Last Sight on August 30, 2019. On April 29, 2020, he released a follow-up EP titled Go Gadget/Blues Clues in collaboration with rapper Dlngqnt.

On June 26, 2020, Mike Henry, who had voiced Cleveland Brown since 1999, announced he was stepping down and believed a person of color should inherit the role. On September 25, 2020, it was announced that Zahir would be voicing Cleveland beginning in season 20 of Family Guy.

== Filmography ==
=== Film ===
Year	Title	Role	Notes
2014	No One But Lydia	Arif	Short film; credited as Arif Lopes
2016	Eraser	Death	Short film; credited as Arif Lopes
2016	The Invisible Shadow	The Bagged Man	Short film; credited as Arif Lopes
2017	Everyone But Me	Andre	Short film
2017	Hues and Hidden Kings	A Hidden King	Short film
2019	The Golden Realm: An American Larping Experience	Peter, Kalthor	Short film

=== Television ===
Year	Title	Role	Notes
2016	Cliffhanger	Ted	3 episodes
2016–2018	Gumbino	Cleveland Brown, Pikachu	Web series; 8 episodes; voice role
2018	G.P.A.	Xander Holland	4 episodes
2018–present	How It Should Have Ended	Black Panther / T'Challa	3 episodes; voice role
2019	Internet Rich	Himself	1 episode
2020	Party Chat	Arif	Web series; also producer
2020	VENN: Arcade Live	Himself	Episode "Voice Impressions with Azerrz + WWE Superstar Zelina Vega Throw Down"
2021–present	Family Guy	Cleveland Brown	Voice role; main role, replaced Mike Henry starting in season 20 after he stepped down
2021	Rocky	Clubber	Voice role
2022	American Dad!	Reginald, Police Officer	2 episodes; voice role
2022	Robot Chicken	Nelson Mandela, Domino's customer	1 episode; voice role

=== Video games ===
Year	Title	Role	Notes
2018	No Way Out – A Dead Realm Tale	Edgar, William Huxley, librarian, Clown	Voice roles
2025	Fortnite Battle Royale	Cleveland Brown	Voice role

=== Music videos ===
Year	Song	Artist	Role	Director
2018	Down the Line	Lokl Yokl	The Bartender	Ryan Rosenblum
2018	Drunk with You	Joe Thomas Carter featuring 4rif	Himself	Zane Morrow
2019	August	4rif	Himself	Fowluh
2019	Gimme Ya Lovin'	Joe Thomas Carter featuring 4rif	Himself	Christina Xing
2020	At Last Sight/Kids	4rif	Himself	Christina Xing
2020	The Window	4rif	Himself	Ryan Rosenblum

=== Radio ===
Year	Title	Role	Notes
2021	sRadio 104.9 (TRC)	Ted	Voice role; guest appearance on episode "Ted Joins the Show"

== Discography ==
=== Albums ===
List of albums
Title	Details
At Last Sight	Released: August 30, 2019; Formats: Digital download, streaming

=== Extended plays ===
List of extended plays
Title	EP details
Go Gadget/Blues Clues (with DLNQNT)	Released: April 29, 2020; Formats: Digital download, streaming
Venture	Releasing: 2021 or 2022; Formats: Digital download, streaming

=== Singles ===
As lead artist

List of singles as lead artist

Title	Year	Album
"August"	2018	At Last Sight
"Summers End"	2019	Non-album single
"Wonderful Miracle"	2019	At Last Sight
"Channel Lovely"	2019	At Last Sight
"Go Gadget" (with DLNQNT)	2020	Go Gadget/Blues Clues
"Blues Clues" (with DLNQNT)	2020	Go Gadget/Blues Clues
"Favorite Girl"	2020	TBA
"Ignore Me"	2020	TBA
"Cafe in LA"	2021	TBA
"Leave Me (August II)"	2021	TBA
"Note to Me"	2022	TBA

As featured artist

List of singles as featured artist

Title	Year	Album
"Hope County" (NerdOut featuring 4rif and Legiqn)	2018	Year 3
"Drunk with You" (Joe Thomas Carter featuring 4rif)	2018	Non-album single
"Gimme Ya Lovin'" (Joe Thomas Carter featuring 4rif)	2019	Non-album single
"G League"(DLNQNT featuring 4rif)	2019	DZJNTD Vol. 1 – DNT PLY
