= Tom Devanney =

American writer

- Born: Thomas Devanney
- Occupation: Writer
- Years active: 1990–present

Thomas Devanney is an American writer and producer. He has written several episodes of the animated series Family Guy.

Devanney also wrote briefly for The Fresh Prince of Bel-Air, and was a producer on Perfect Strangers in the 1991–92 season. Devanney and his Perfect Strangers producing colleagues (Shari Hearn, Bob Keyes) went on to produce the Fox sitcom Shaky Ground, which ran during the 1992–93 season and starred Matt Frewer, Robin Riker and Jennifer Love Hewitt.

Devanney met fellow Family Guy writer Chris Sheridan while writing for the 1993 series Thea. While not only writing for several episodes of Family Guy including the famous "You Have AIDS" song, as well as The Fresh Prince of Bel-Air in the final season, he voiced Marilyn Manson in an episode of Family Guy.

== Family Guy ==
Devanney joined Family Guy in 2005. He has since written multiple episodes, including:

- "Breaking Out Is Hard to Do" (2005)
- "Mother Tucker" (2006)
- "Airport '07" (2007)
- "Back to the Woods" (2008)
- "Brian's Got a Brand New Bag" (2009)
- "The Family Guy 100th Episode Special" (2007)
- "Quagmire's Dad" (2010)
- "The Hand That Rocks the Wheelchair" (2011)
- "Meg and Quagmire" (2012)
- "Family Guy Viewer Mail #2" (with Alec Sulkin and Deepak Sethi) (2012)
- "Jesus, Mary and Joseph!" (2012)
- "The Most Interesting Man in the World" (2014)
- "Quagmire's Mom" (2015)
- "Peter's Sister" (2015)
- "The Dating Game" (2017)
- "Nanny Goats" (2017)
- "Bri-Da" (2019)
