= Kara Vallow =

American television producer and computer animator

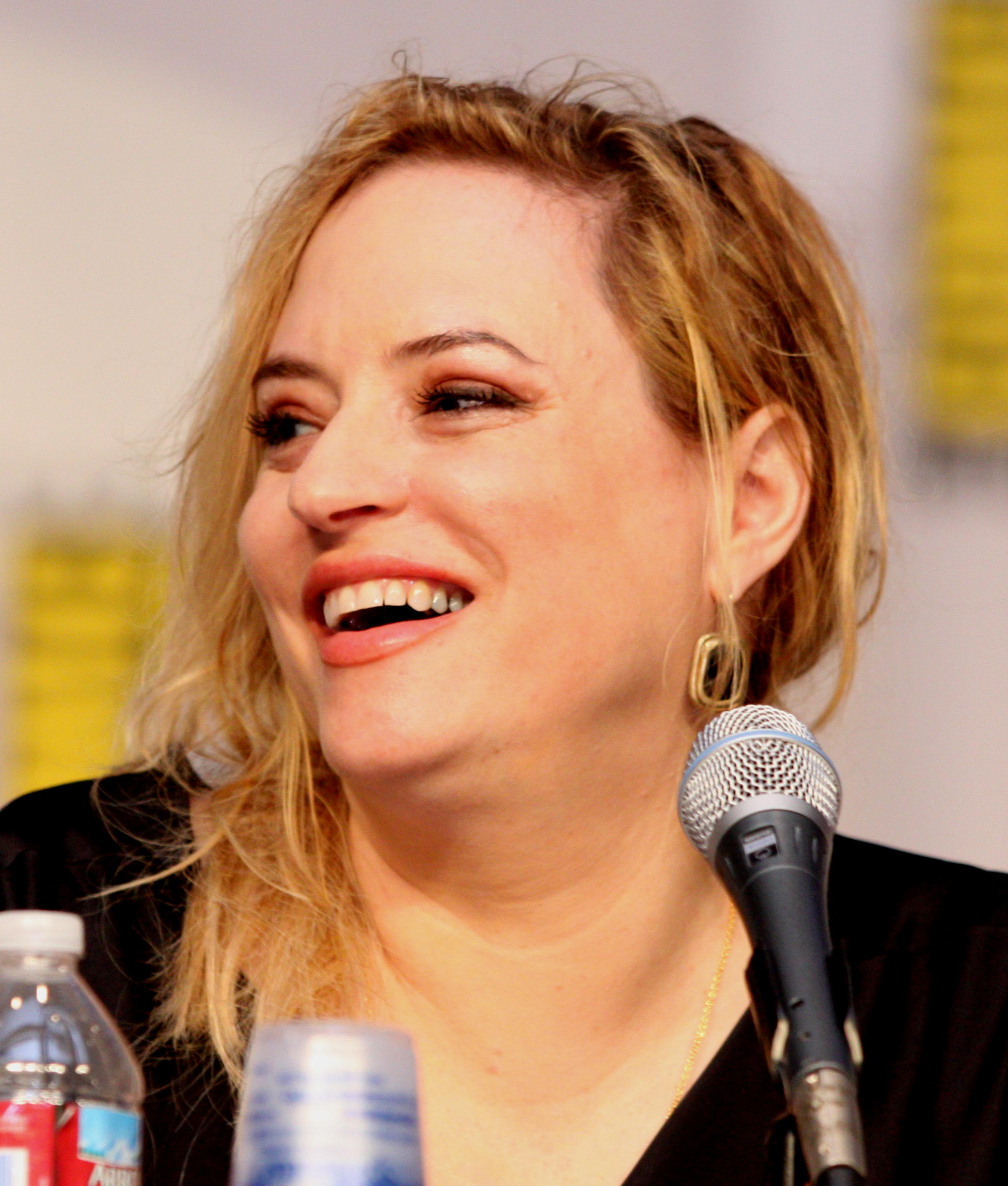
- Vallow in 2010
- Education: School of Visual Arts
- Occupation: Television producer
- Years active: 1983–present
- Website: teensleuth.com/blog/

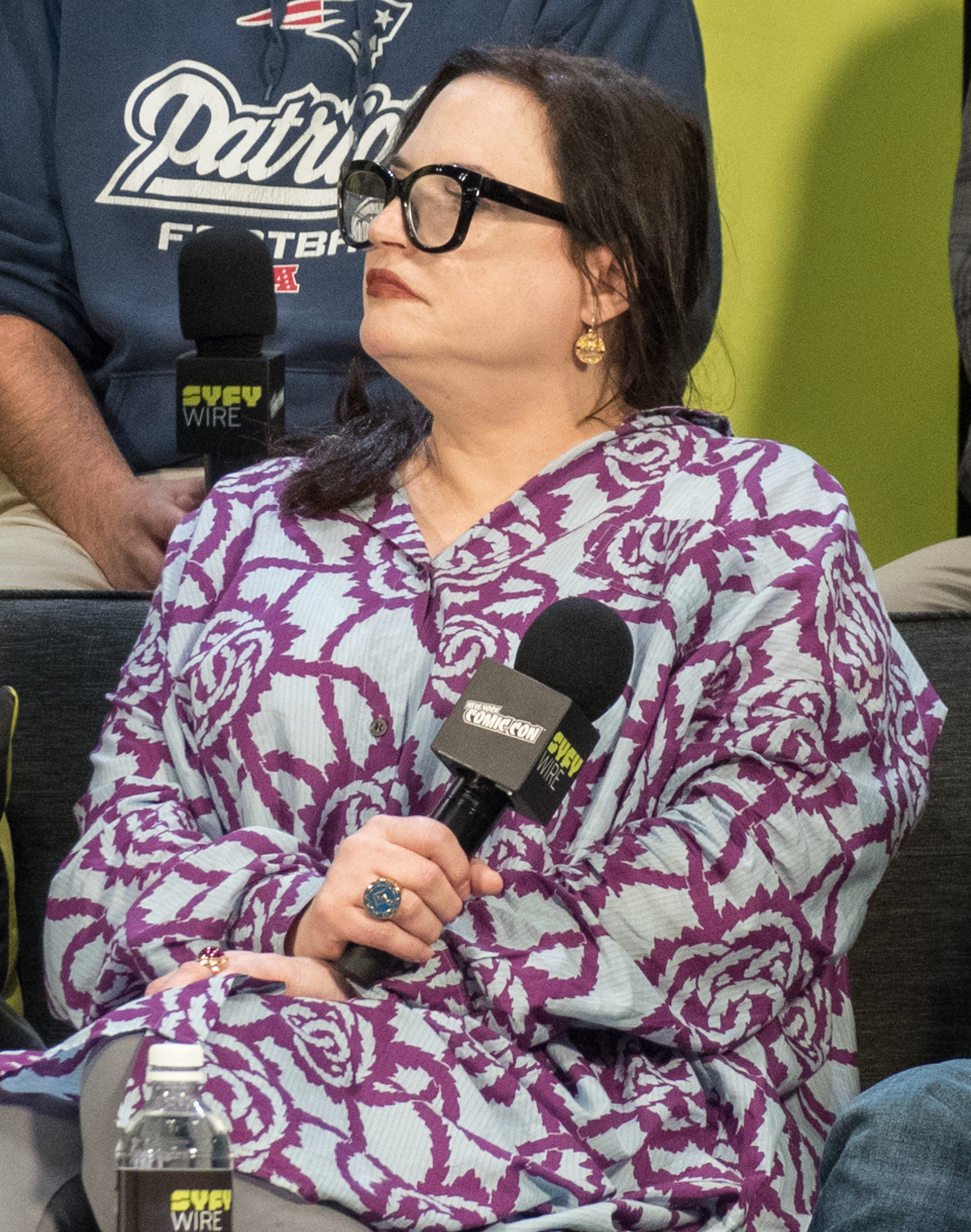
Vallow in 2018

Kara Vallow is an American television producer and computer animator. She has worked on four television series by Seth MacFarlane's Fuzzy Door Productions: Family Guy, American Dad!, The Cleveland Show, and Cosmos: A Spacetime Odyssey. She served as a producer on the first season of Cartoon Network's Johnny Bravo. She is the producer of all of Fox's primetime Sunday night lineup with the exception of The Simpsons.

== Early life and education ==
In the 1970s, Vallow lived in Miquon, Pennsylvania. She was educated at The Miquon School (Conshohocken, Pennsylvania), Germantown Friends School (Philadelphia, Pennsylvania) and School of Visual Arts (New York City).

== Career ==
Vallow worked at the New York City-based studio Broadcast Arts, best known for set design for Pee-wee's Playhouse. She eventually moved to Los Angeles to work at Hyperion Pictures as the supervisor of the production layout department on the feature Bebe's Kids, a multi-cultural animated feature film.

Over the next few years, Vallow moved to Murakami-Wolf as producer of Teenage Mutant Ninja Turtles TV series during its waning years. She worked at Hanna-Barbera, where she produced the series Johnny Bravo, and where she met Seth MacFarlane.

Vallow then went on to Sony to produce its first primetime series, Dilbert, with Larry Charles, which ran on UPN for two seasons. She then took over as producer for season three of Family Guy before its brief cancellation. In 2004, Vallow created and produced the animation sequences in the critically acclaimed and award-winning documentary In the Realms of the Unreal directed by Jessica Yu. She produced the MTV series 3-South, the pilot for Comedy Central’s Drawn Together and the presentations for Fox's American Dad! and an untitled Phil Hendrie pilot, before Fox made the decision to bring back Family Guy for an unprecedented 35 episode order. In order to accommodate producing both Family Guy and American Dad! simultaneously, she built a standalone animation studio for 20th Television and assembled a 200+ person team.

In 2014, she joined the science series Cosmos: A Spacetime Odyssey, developing and producing animated content that could both convey scientific concepts as well as engaged story-telling for the show, which won an Annie Award in 2014 for "Best Animated Special Production". She was also nominated for an Annie Award that year for "Outstanding Achievement for Production Design in an Animated Television / Broadcast Production". She organized the team of artists who produced the animation for Cosmos: Possible Worlds in 2020.

She also produced the Fox presentations Two Dreadful Children and Bordertown. Nominated for seven Emmy Awards, Vallow was at one time responsible for three half-hours of programming on Sunday nights: Family Guy, American Dad!, and The Cleveland Show.

Vallow runs two blogs, Teen Sleuth and the book blog, The Haunted Library.
