= Animation on Fox =

History of animated programming on the Fox Broadcasting Company

The American television network Fox has aired numerous animated television series. During the more than thirty-year existence of the network, there have been many successful prime time animated series. The first and most famous of these, The Simpsons, was the first such series since the end of The Flintstones in the 1960s.

== History ==
=== 1980s ===
When the upstart young Fox Broadcasting Company (Fox) was formed in 1986 by Rupert Murdoch, early shows tended to attract low viewership, with the exception of some early ratings successes such as Married... with Children and 21 Jump Street. The animation industry had experienced a decline in the 1980s, but later experienced a revival after the success of films made by Disney and Steven Spielberg such as An American Tail, The Land Before Time, Who Framed Roger Rabbit and The Little Mermaid.

In 1987, The Tracey Ullman Show premiered with mild success. During this time, a series of short cartoons originally intended to be bumpers gained a following with young and old audiences, and Fox ordered thirteen episodes of a new animated television series based on these, titled The Simpsons. When The Simpsons premiered in December 1989, the series was instantly popular. Merchandise featuring the show's breakout character Bart Simpson has accumulated over US$1 billion in sales. The Simpsons was the first successful primetime animated series since The Flintstones, paving the way for other animated series on major broadcast networks. Since its debut, a total of 811 episodes of The Simpsons have aired, and the series has recently aired its 37th season, with three more on the way.

=== 1990s ===
In September 1992, Batman: The Animated Series made its debut, and from December 1992 to March 1993, it aired in primetime while also airing on Fox Kids for several more years.

Also in September 1992, Eek! The Cat premiered on Fox Kids. In 1994, it was renamed to Eek! Stavaganza. Eek! ended in 1997. The only episode of the series to air in primetime was a Christmas special in 1993.

A few Tiny Toon Adventures specials were also aired in primetime during that show's run on Fox Kids.

In 1994, X-Men: The Animated Series had a brief primetime run as the first two episodes of season 3 aired in primetime on Friday nights in July and August 1994 for two consecutive weeks. The last episode of season 3 (along with an episode of Spider-Man) would premiere in primetime in June 1995.

Also, in 1994, The Tick, an animated superhero/satirical Children's show based on the comic of the same name aired on Fox Kids. A repeat of the show's Christmas episode aired in primetime in 1996.

A boom in new adult-oriented animated programming began thereafter, with MTV's Beavis and Butt-head beginning in 1992, and Simpsons producers Al Jean's and Mike Reiss' own series, The Critic, in 1994. The Critic ran for one season (13 episodes) on its original network, ABC (in 1994); from there, it moved to Fox, where it ran for another season of 10 episodes (1995). The Critic can be described as a minor success, with DVD sales and late-night showings on cable networks (such as Comedy Central) making it a cult hit. It received critical acclaim, being the only television series to ever be reviewed on Siskel and Ebert, in which it received "Two Thumbs Up".

Two episodes of Life with Louie aired in primetime before it debuted on Fox Kids. It was created by Louie Anderson. It ended in 1998.

Mike Judge left Beavis and Butt-head in the mid-1990s to begin a new project with Simpsons writer Greg Daniels. King of the Hill premiered in January 1997, and was a huge success for the network. In August 1997, Trey Parker and Matt Stone's South Park debuted on the cable network Comedy Central, and with its subversive humor and numerous obscenities, it became controversial in a way similar to The Simpsons seven years earlier. Ironically, Parker and Stone originally developed South Park for Fox, which declined to pick up the show due to the inclusion of a talking stool character (Mr. Hankey) being over the top for the network.

=== 2000s ===
Created by comedian Eddie Murphy, the series The PJs debuted in January 1999. The show was a minor success similar to The Critic, but the show's high budget caused it to be moved to The WB in 2001, where it lasted one season.

Seth MacFarlane's animated series Family Guy premiered after Super Bowl XXXIII in 1999. The show was canceled in 2000, but fan petitions convinced Fox to renew it for a third season. After its third season ended in 2002, the network canceled the series again and reruns soon began airing on Cartoon Network's Adult Swim.

Ratings for the series increased soon after, and DVD sales increased. Family Guy was revived and began airing again on Fox on May 1, 2005. Family Guy has remained a large success for the network. It is currently airing its 24th season, MacFarlane's follow-up series, American Dad!, began airing on February 6, 2005, and despite low ratings, the series was renewed for multiple seasons on the network before being transferred to TBS in 2014.

Futurama, the follow-up series from The Simpsons creator Matt Groening, began in late March 1999, and was later canceled (with its last episode aired on August 10, 2003) thanks to scheduling changes (the same fate met previously by Family Guy during its original run). In a similar move to Family Guy, high DVD sales and ratings led to four separate DVD movies released from 2007 to 2009, all later broadcast on Comedy Central. Futurama was brought back in 2009 to Comedy Central, with new episodes airing from 2010 to 2013.

King of the Hill aired its final episode on September 13, 2009. The Cleveland Show, another endeavor from Seth MacFarlane, premiered on the network on September 27, 2009. It stars Family Guy character Cleveland Brown. The show was cancelled on May 19, 2013.

Arrested Development creator Mitch Hurwitz and former Simpsons executive producer Josh Weinstein developed an American version of Sit Down, Shut Up, which aired from April 19 to November 21, 2009.

=== 2010s ===
On January 9, 2011, Bob's Burgers premiered. It started airing its 16th season.

From October 30, 2011, to February 19, 2017, Fox aired Allen Gregory, Napoleon Dynamite, Axe Cop, High School USA!, Lucas Bros. Moving Co., Golan the Insatiable, Bordertown, and Son of Zorn which have been all canceled after one season.

On October 8, 2013, Fox removed the unaired series Murder Police without airing a single episode. In 2014, Fox canceled American Dad! (which moved to TBS) and stopped using the Animation Domination branding. It was brought back in September 2019 when Bless the Harts debuted, which was renewed for a second season in October 2019.

=== 2020s ===
Duncanville debuted on February 16, 2020. Its second season premiered on May 23, 2021. In April 2021, ahead of the second-season premiere, Fox renewed the series for a third season, which premiered on May 1, 2022.

The Great North premiered on January 3, 2021. In June 2020, the series was renewed for a second season ahead of its premiere. In May 2021, Fox renewed the series for a third season, one day after airing its first-season finale. In August 2022, a fourth season of the series was picked up.

In April 2021, Fox canceled Bless the Harts after two seasons. It concluded on June 20, 2021.

HouseBroken premiered on May 31, 2021. It was renewed for a second season in August 2021.

In June 2022, Fox canceled Duncanville after three seasons. It concluded on Fox on June 26, 2022; however, the final six episodes were released on October 18, 2022, on Hulu.

Krapopolis and Grimsburg were originally scheduled to premiere sometime in the 2022–23 season, but were pushed back to the 2023–24 season. In October 2022, Fox renewed Krapopolis and Grimsburg each for a second season ahead of their premieres. In March 2023, Krapopolis was renewed for a third season. Krapopolis premiered on September 24, 2023. Grimsburg premiered on January 7, 2024. In July 2024, Krapopolis was renewed for a fourth season.

Universal Basic Guys premiered on September 8, 2024. In May 2024, the series was renewed for a second season ahead of its premiere.

In May 2024, Fox canceled HouseBroken after two seasons. It concluded on August 6, 2023.

In October 2025, Fox canceled The Great North after five seasons.

In February 2026, American Dad! returned to Fox after ten seasons on TBS.

== List of cartoon series ==
- The Simpsons (1989–present)
- Batman: The Animated Series (1992–1993)
- Tiny Toon Adventures specials (1992–95)
- Eek! The Cat special (1993)
- The Tick (one episode) (1996)
- X-Men: The Animated Series (1994–1995)
- Life with Louie (two episodes) (1994–1996)
- The Critic (1995; 1994 on ABC)
- Spider-Man (one episode) (1995)
- King of the Hill (1997–2010, 2025–present on Hulu)
- Family Guy (1999–2002, 2005–present)
- The PJs (1999–2000, 2001–2002 on the WB)
- Futurama (1999–2003, 2008–2013 on Comedy Central, 2023–present on Hulu)
- American Dad! (2005–2014, 2014–2025 on TBS, 2026-present)
- Sit Down, Shut Up (2009)
- The Cleveland Show (2009–2013)
- Bob's Burgers (2011–present)
- Allen Gregory (2011)
- Napoleon Dynamite (2012)
- Axe Cop (2013, 2015 on FXX)
- High School USA! (2013, 2015 on FXX)
- Lucas Bros. Moving Co. (2013–2014, 2014–2015 on FXX)
- Golan the Insatiable (2013–2015)
- Bordertown (2016)
- Son of Zorn (2016–2017)
- Bless the Harts (2019–2021)
- Duncanville (2020–2022)
- The Great North (2021–2025)
- HouseBroken (2021–2023)
- Krapopolis (2023–present)
- Grimsburg (2024–present)
- Universal Basic Guys (2024–present)

=== Unaired ===
- Murder Police (2013)

== See also ==
- List of programs broadcast by Fox
- Animation Domination
- 20th Century Animation
- 20th Television Animation
- Klasky Csupo
- Film Roman
- Fox Sunday Night
- Animation Throwdown: The Quest for Cards
- Warner Bros. Animation
