= Fox Sunday Night =

Sunday night block on the Fox network

- Network: Fox
- Launched: First run: September 28, 2014; 12 years ago Second run: September 27, 2026; 14 days ago
- Closed: First run: September 15, 2019; 7 years ago
- Country of origin: United States
- Format: Animation; Comedy; Adult animation Live action
- Running time: Sunday 7:00 PM – 10:00 PM

Fox Sunday Night is the branding of the Sunday night primetime lineup on the Fox network, which featured a mix of animated and live-action series. It ran between stints of Animation Domination.

== History ==
=== Sunday Funday (2014–17) ===
The Sunday Funday block was created to replace Fox's Animation Domination block, acknowledging that the Sunday primetime schedule was no longer fully made up of animated shows. The block's final show was American Dad!, of which was the final episode to air on Fox before moving to TBS on September 21, 2014. The initial lineup incorporated the remaining animated series from Animation Domination (The Simpsons, Family Guy, and Bob's Burgers) with the addition of Brooklyn Nine-Nine, which previously aired on Tuesday nights, and the new sitcom, Mulaney. This marked the first time that Fox had regularly aired first-run live-action comedies on Sundays since 2005. Mulaney was cancelled in February 2015 and was replaced by mid-season replacement The Last Man on Earth.

On January 3, 2016, Brooklyn Nine-Nine was dropped from the Sunday Funday block and moved back to its original Tuesday night slot. The Last Man on Earth would then go on hiatus. In their place, new series Bordertown and Cooper Barrett's Guide to Surviving Life took their slots. Ultimately, both series were cancelled after one season.

On September 25, 2016, Son of Zorn premiered at 8:30pm. The series would be replaced by Making History on March 5, 2017. Both series would also be cancelled after one season.

James Arnold Taylor served as the announcer for the block.

=== As "Fox Sunday Night" (2017–19, 2026–present) ===
Beginning with the 2017/18 season, the Sunday Funday block was dropped. Hereafter, the Sunday night lineup was simply referred to as "Fox Sunday". Ghosted premiered on October 1, 2017, but was cancelled after one season. On May 10, 2018, The Last Man on Earth was cancelled. The following day, Brooklyn Nine-Nine was picked up by NBC.

For the 2018/19 season, Rel premiered as a sneak preview on September 9, 2018. The series would also be cancelled after one season. A new season of Cosmos was set to premiere in the Spring, but was pulled. Reruns of Last Man Standing, began airing in the 7PM hour.

Ahead of the 2019/20 season, Fox began promoting the return of the Animation Domination block, with new show Bless the Harts debuting that fall.

Beginning with the 2026/27 season, the fifth season of Animal Control premiered on September 27, 2026 after The Simpsons. The block is also called "Animal-ation Domination" acknowledging the arrival of the former to Sunday nights in the promos.

=== Lineup history ===
==== 2014/15 ====
| Season | 7:00 p.m. | 7:30 p.m. | 8:00 p.m. | 8:30 p.m. | 9:00 p.m. | 9:30 p.m. |
|---|---|---|---|---|---|---|
| Fall | Fox NFL | Bob's Burgers | The Simpsons | Brooklyn Nine-Nine | Family Guy | Mulaney |
| Late fall | Fox NFL | Mulaney | The Simpsons | Brooklyn Nine-Nine | Family Guy | Bob's Burgers |
| Winter | Mulaney | The Simpsons (R) | The Simpsons | Brooklyn Nine-Nine | Family Guy | Bob's Burgers |
| Spring | The Simpsons (R) | Bob's Burgers | The Simpsons | Brooklyn Nine-Nine | Family Guy | The Last Man on Earth |
| Summer | Bob's Burgers (R) | Bob's Burgers | The Simpsons | Brooklyn Nine-Nine | Family Guy | Golan the Insatiable |
| Late summer | Bob's Burgers (R) | Bob's Burgers | The Simpsons | Brooklyn Nine-Nine | Family Guy | The Last Man on Earth (R) |

==== 2015/16 ====
| Season | 7:00 p.m. | 7:30 p.m. | 8:00 p.m. | 8:30 p.m. | 9:00 p.m. | 9:30 p.m. |
|---|---|---|---|---|---|---|
| Fall | Fox NFL | Bob's Burgers | The Simpsons | Brooklyn Nine-Nine | Family Guy | The Last Man on Earth |
| Winter | The Simpsons (R) | Bob's Burgers | The Simpsons | Cooper Barrett's Guide to Surviving Life | Family Guy | Bordertown |
| Late winter | Bordertown | Bob's Burgers | The Simpsons | Cooper Barrett's Guide to Surviving Life | Family Guy | The Last Man on Earth |
| Spring | Bordertown | Cooper Barrett's Guide to Surviving Life | The Simpsons | Bob's Burgers | Family Guy | The Last Man on Earth |
| Late spring | Bordertown | The Simpsons (R) | The Simpsons | Bob's Burgers | Family Guy | The Last Man on Earth |
| Summer | Bob's Burgers (R) | The Simpsons (R) | The Simpsons | Brooklyn Nine-Nine (R) | Family Guy | The Last Man on Earth |

==== 2016/17 ====
| Season | 7:00 p.m. | 7:30 p.m. | 8:00 p.m. | 8:30 p.m. | 9:00 p.m. | 9:30 p.m. |
|---|---|---|---|---|---|---|
| Fall | Fox NFL | Bob's Burgers | The Simpsons | Son of Zorn | Family Guy | The Last Man on Earth |
| Winter | Animation Encores | | The Simpsons | Son of Zorn | Family Guy | Bob's Burgers |
| Spring | Animation Encores | Bob's Burgers | The Simpsons | Making History | Family Guy | The Last Man on Earth |
| Summer | Bob's Burgers (R) | The Last Man on Earth (R) | The Simpsons | Family Guy (R) | American Grit | |

==== 2017/18 ====
| Season | 7:00 p.m. | 7:30 p.m. | 8:00 p.m. | 8:30 p.m. | 9:00 p.m. | 9:30 p.m. |
|---|---|---|---|---|---|---|
| Fall | Fox NFL (4:25 p.m.) | Bob's Burgers | The Simpsons | Ghosted | Family Guy | The Last Man on Earth |
| Winter | Brooklyn Nine-Nine (R) | Bob's Burgers | The Simpsons | Ghosted | Family Guy | LA to Vegas (R) |
| Spring | Bob's Burgers (R) | Bob's Burgers | The Simpsons | Brooklyn Nine-Nine | Family Guy | The Last Man on Earth |
| Summer | One Strange Rock (R) | | The Simpsons | Bob's Burgers (R) | Family Guy | Ghosted |
| Late summer | Various programming | | The Simpsons | Bob's Burgers (R) | Family Guy | Family Guy (R) |

==== 2018/19 ====
| Season | 7:00 p.m. | 7:30 p.m. | 8:00 p.m. | 8:30 p.m. | 9:00 p.m. | 9:30 p.m. |
|---|---|---|---|---|---|---|
| Fall | Fox NFL (4:25 p.m.) | The OT | The Simpsons | Bob's Burgers | Family Guy | Rel |
| Winter | The Simpsons (R) | Bob's Burgers (R) | The Simpsons | Bob's Burgers | Family Guy | Family Guy (R) |
| Summer | Last Man Standing (R) | | The Simpsons | Bob's Burgers | Family Guy | What Just Happened??! |

==== 2026/27 ====
| Season | 7:00 p.m. | 7:30 p.m. | 8:00 p.m. | 8:30 p.m. | 9:00 p.m. | 9:30 p.m. |
|---|---|---|---|---|---|---|
| Fall | Fox NFL (4:25 p.m.) | The OT | The Simpsons | Animal Control | Universal Basic Guys | Grimsburg |

== Shows ==
| Title | First aired | Last aired | Notes |
Animation
| The Simpsons | September 28, 2014 | present | Previously part of Animation Domination / Moved back to Animation Domination |
| Family Guy | September 28, 2014 | present | Previously part of Animation Domination / Moved back to Animation Domination |
| Bob's Burgers | October 5, 2014 | September 1, 2019 | Previously part of Animation Domination / Moved back to Animation Domination |
| Golan the Insatiable | May 31, 2015 | July 19, 2015 | Cancelled; Aired reruns on ADHD until March 6, 2016 |
| Bordertown | January 3, 2016 | May 22, 2016 | Cancelled |
| Grimsburg | January 7, 2024 | present | Part of Animation Domination |
| Universal Basic Guys | September 8, 2024 | present | Part of Animation Domination |
Live-action
| Brooklyn Nine-Nine | September 28, 2014 | May 20, 2018 | Cancelled, revived at NBC |
| Mulaney | October 5, 2014 | February 15, 2015 | Cancelled |
| The Last Man on Earth | March 1, 2015 | May 6, 2018 | Cancelled |
| Cooper Barrett's Guide to Surviving Life | January 3, 2016 | April 17, 2016 | Cancelled |
| Making History | March 5, 2017 | May 21, 2017 | Cancelled |
| American Grit | June 11, 2017 | August 6, 2017 | Cancelled |
| Ghosted | October 1, 2017 | July 22, 2018 | Cancelled |
| Rel | September 9, 2018 | January 13, 2019 | Cancelled |
| What Just Happened??! with Fred Savage | June 30, 2019 | September 1, 2019 | Cancelled |
| The Masked Singer | September 15, 2019 | | Special presentation |
| Animal Control | September 27, 2026 | present | Part of Sunday Night |
Hybrid
| Son of Zorn | September 11, 2016 | February 19, 2017 | Cancelled |

== See also ==
- List of programs broadcast by Fox
- Animation on Fox
- Animation Domination
