= Sunday Funday =

Sunday Funday may refer to:

- Sunday Funday (TV program), a Philippine variety show
- Sunday Funday (block), later Fox Sunday Night, a programming block on American TV network Fox
- Sunday Funday, a 1995 video game based on Menace Beach
