= List of programs broadcast by Fox =

The Fox Broadcasting Company (FOX) is an American commercial broadcasting television network that launched in 1986. It is owned by the Fox Entertainment division of the Fox Corporation and is one of the "Big Four" television networks. Below is a list of programs currently broadcast on the network.

== Overview ==
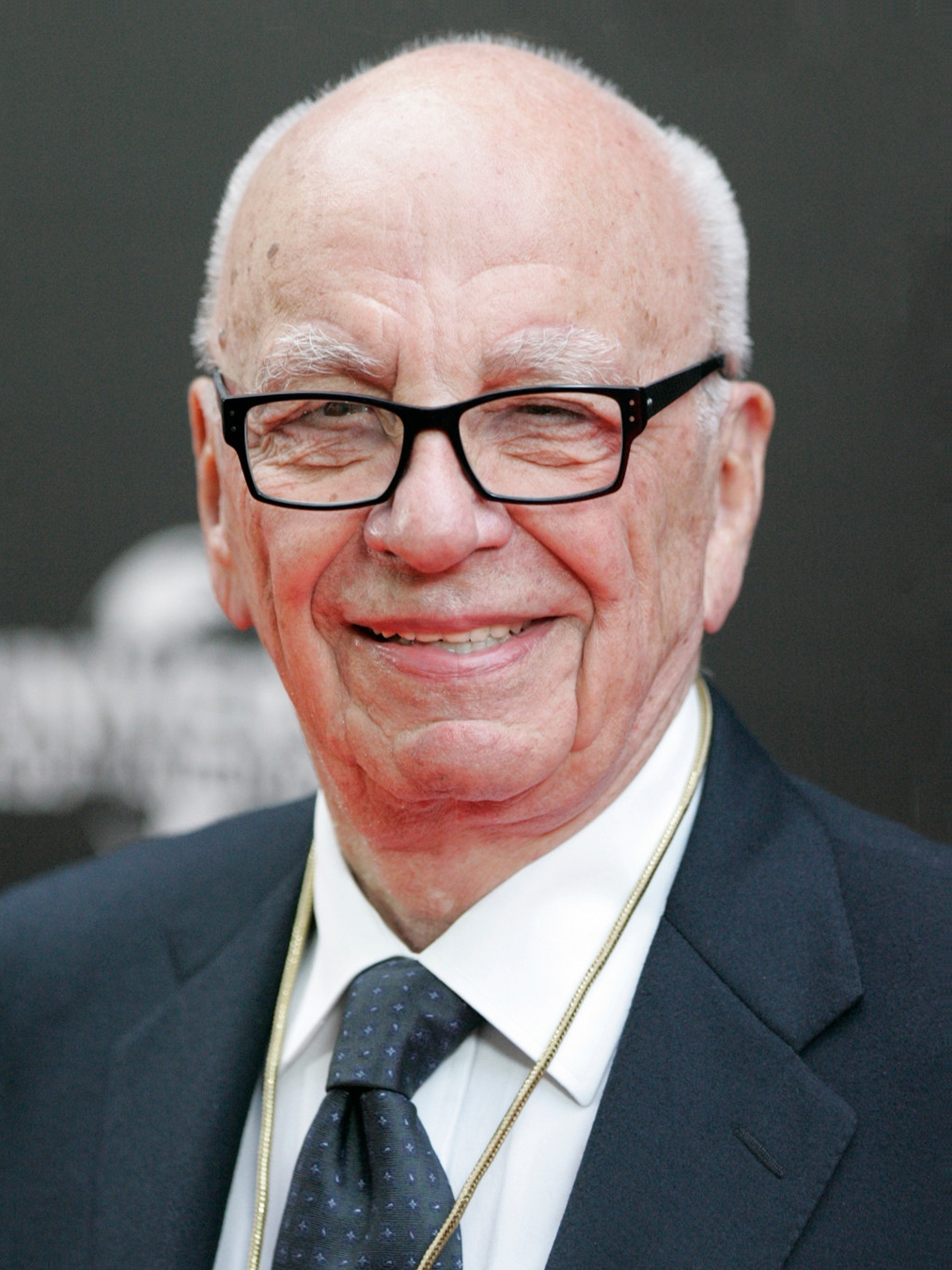
Rupert Murdoch – co-founder of the Fox Broadcasting Company

While Fox began operating in 1986, it began its official primetime lineup the following year with the series Married... with Children and The Tracey Ullman Show.

As of October 2012, Fox maintains 19.5 hours of network programming per week. The animated comedy series The Simpsons is one of Fox's most popular shows, becoming the network's first series to rank among the top 30-highest-rated shows of a television season after its original debut, and is the longest running sitcom, as well as animated series, of all time, contributing to the network's success. According to Lanford Beard of Entertainment Weekly, "The Simpsons have transformed Fox from a small, ignored network into a global network that cannot be ignored." The science fiction television series The X-Files also contributed to the network's success, which led to two spin-offs Millennium and The Lone Gunmen. Fox began airing in high-definition on September 12, 2004, with a series of National Football League (NFL) American football games. Fox had a programming block for children titled Fox Kids, which ran from September 8, 1990, to September 7, 2002.

Unlike the "three larger networks", which aired primetime programming from 8 to 11 p.m. (EST) Mondays to Saturdays and 7 to 11 p.m. (EST) Sundays, Fox has traditionally avoided programming in the 10 p.m. (EST) time interval, leaving that hour to affiliates to program locally (primarily with local newscasts).

On April 21, 2012, Fox celebrated its 25th-anniversary, with a two-hour television special featuring people related to Fox and its shows. It presented Fox's programs 24, American Idol, Cops, Family Guy, Married... with Children, The Simpsons, and The X-Files, among other programs. The network's adult cartoons are listed under the Animation Domination banner, which is a Sunday night programming block. Fox is a full member of the North American Broadcasters Association (NABA) and the National Association of Broadcasters (NAB).

== Current programming ==
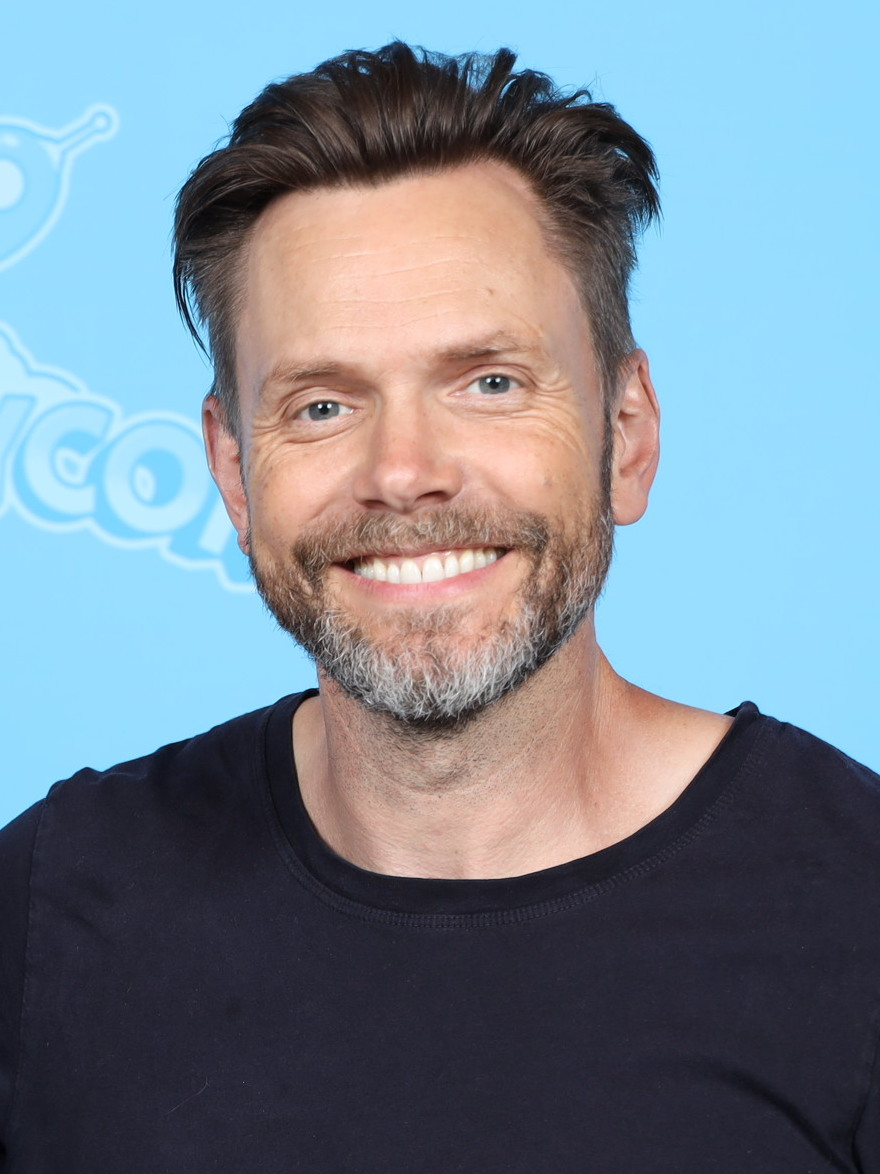
Joel McHale – star of the comedy series Animal Control, host of the game show The 1% Club and the reality series Crime Scene Kitchen

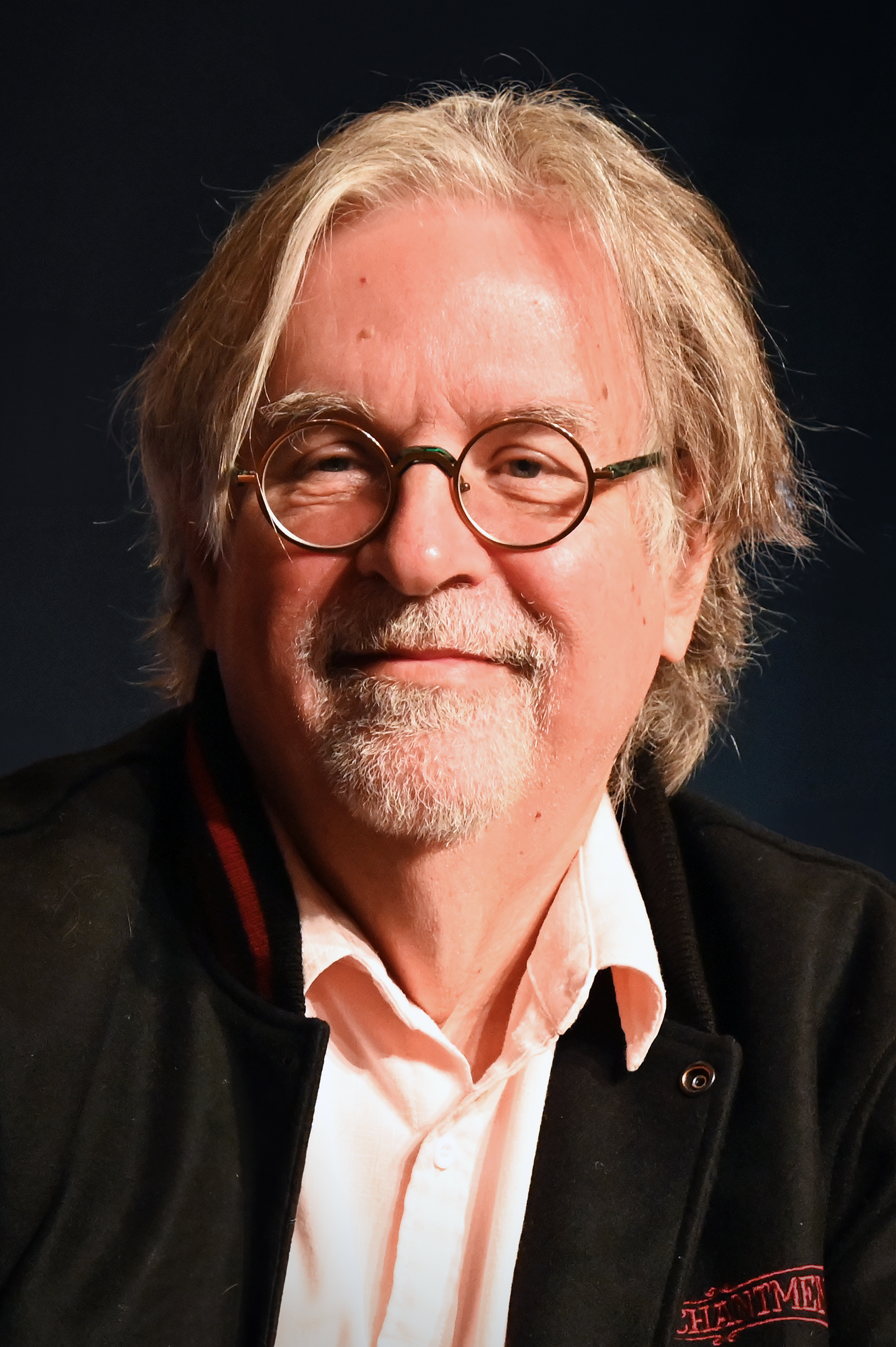
Matt Groening – creator of the animated series The Simpsons, Fox's longest running program

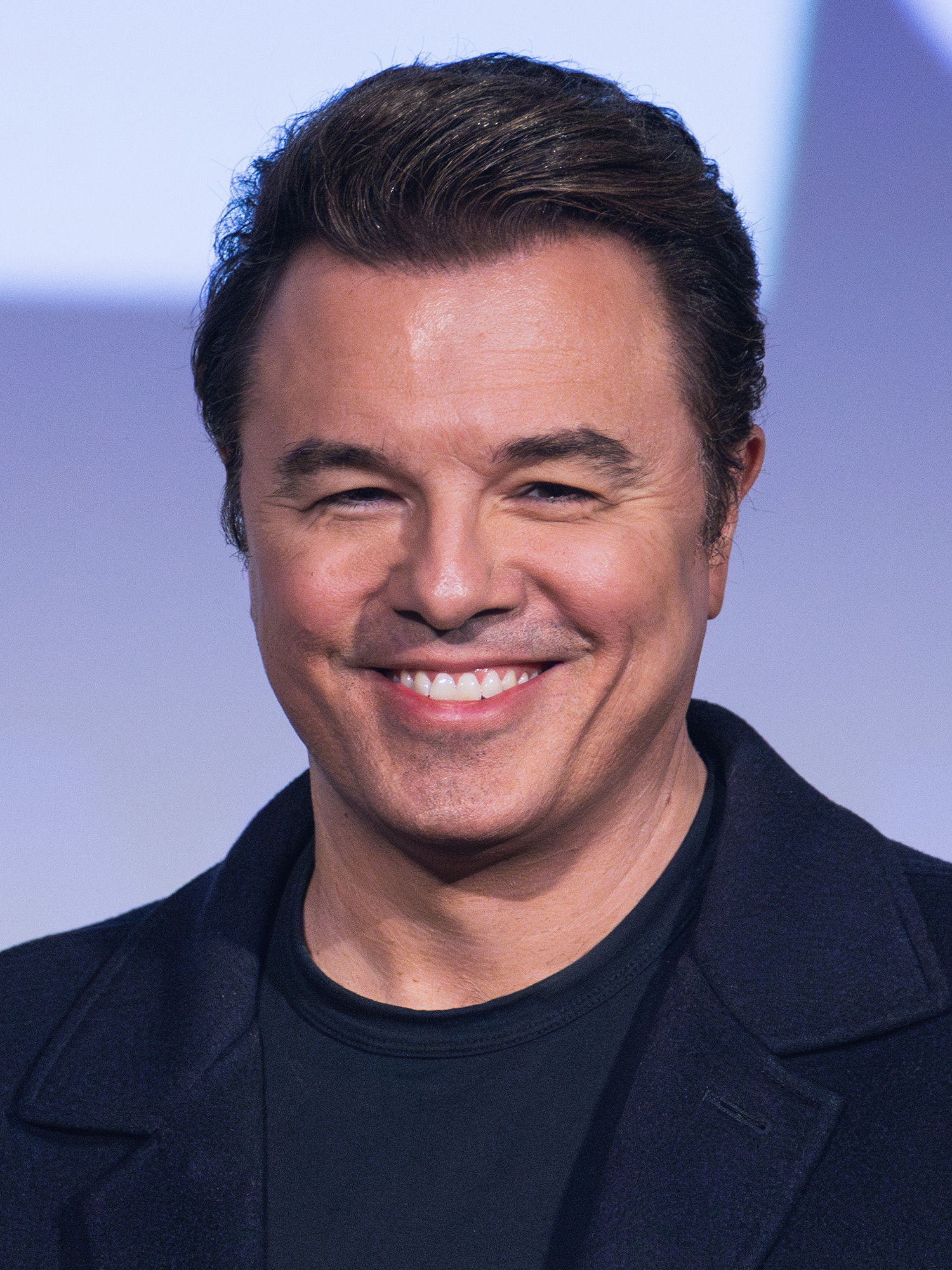
Seth MacFarlane – creator and star of the animated series Family Guy and American Dad!

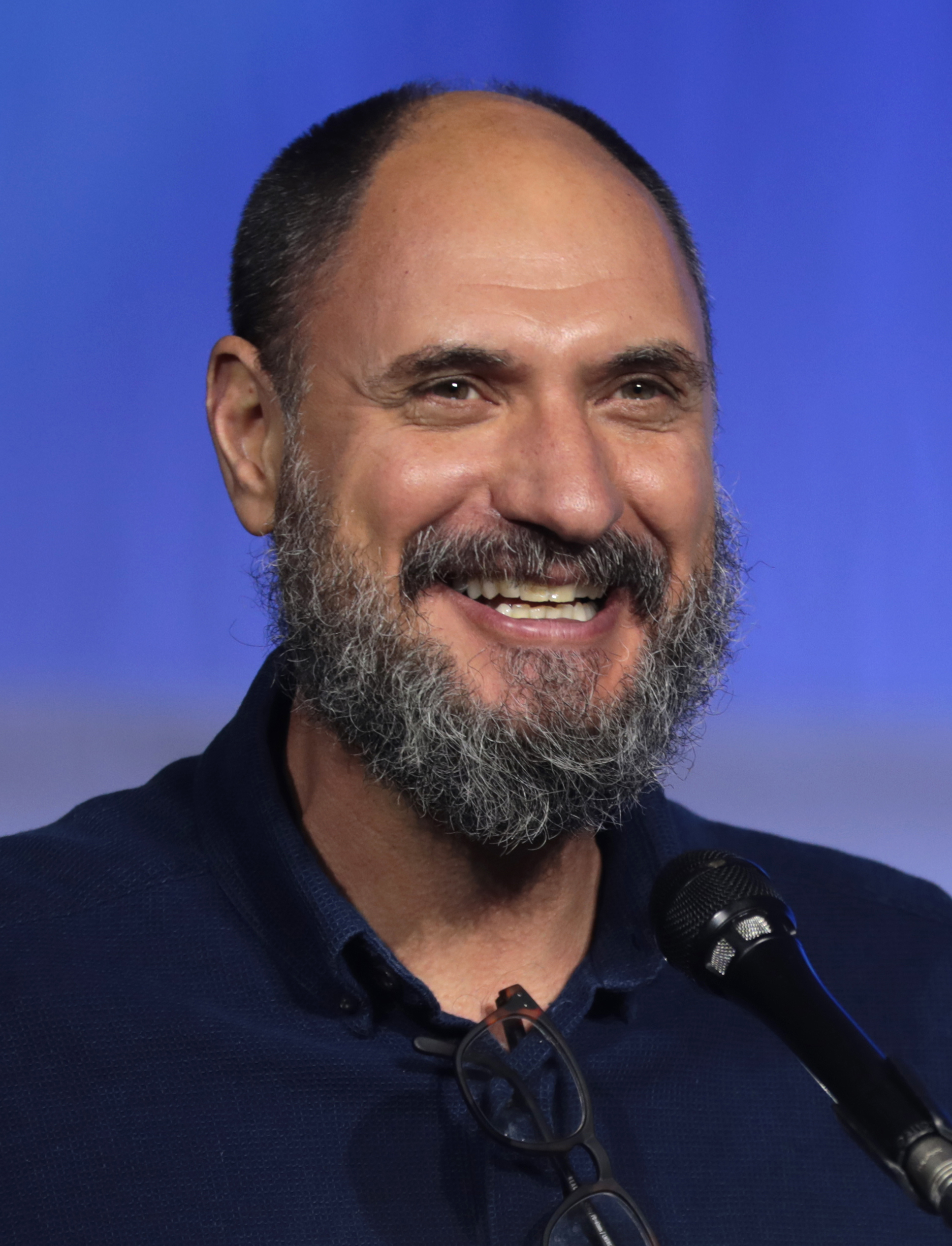
Loren Bouchard – creator of the animated series Bob's Burgers

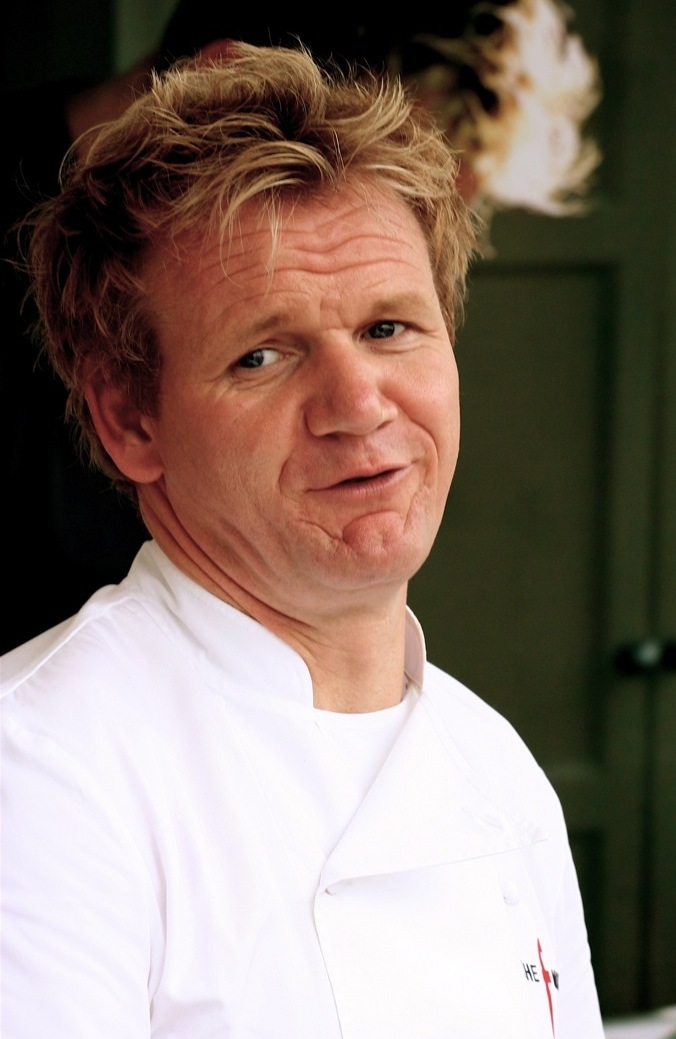
Gordon Ramsay – host of the reality series Hell's Kitchen, Kitchen Nightmares, MasterChef, and Next Level Chef

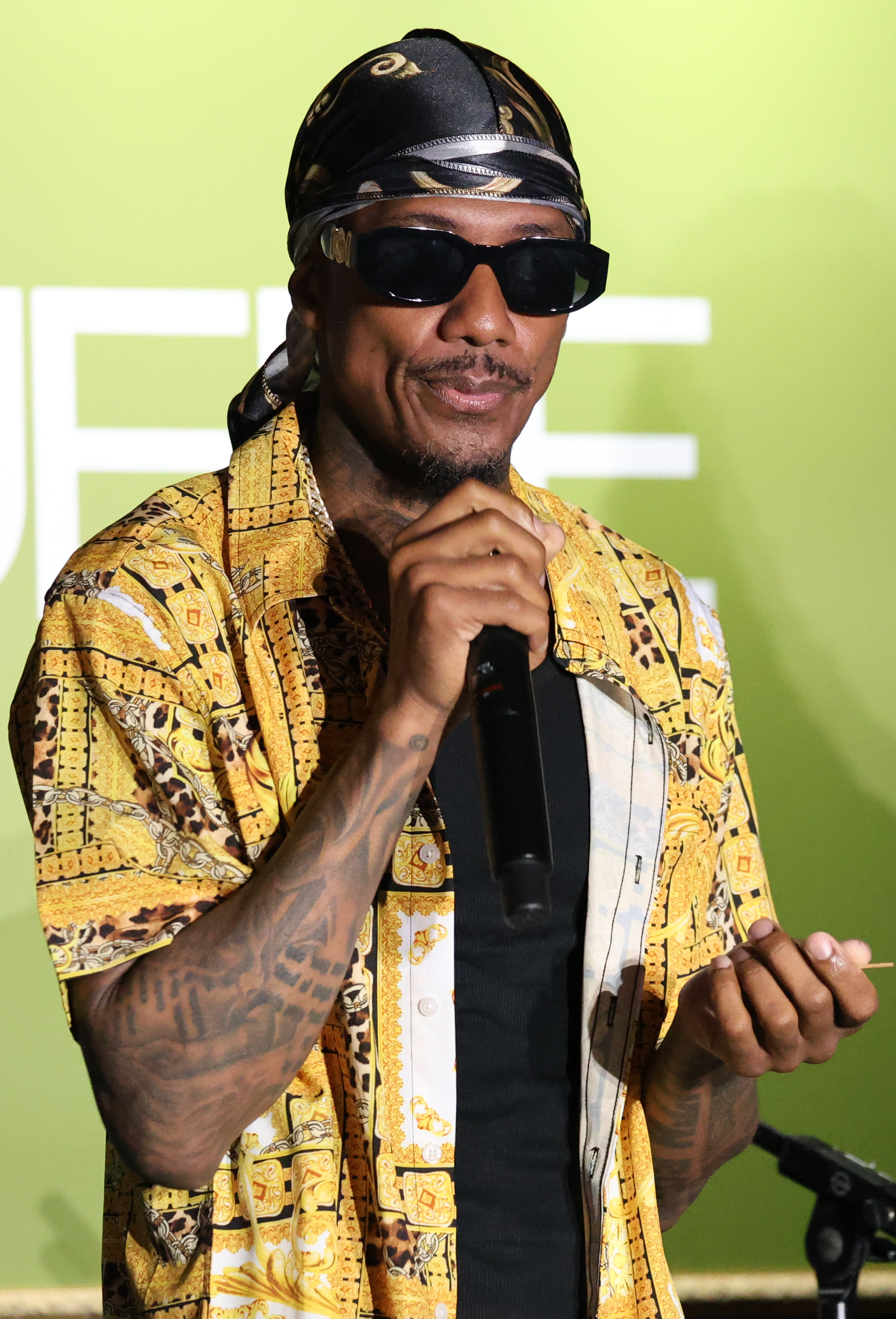
Nick Cannon – host of the reality series The Masked Singer

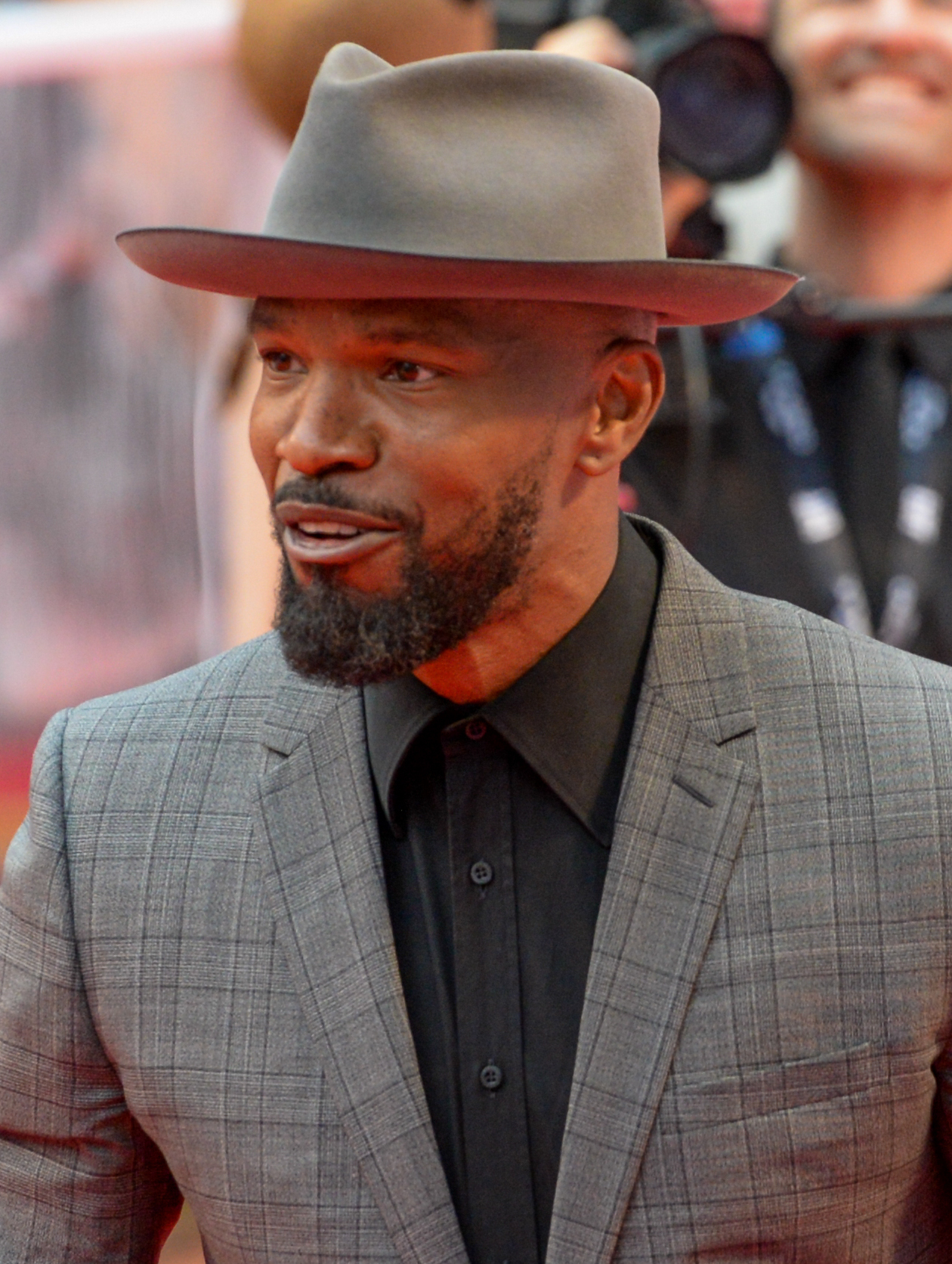
Jamie Foxx – host of the game show Beat Shazam

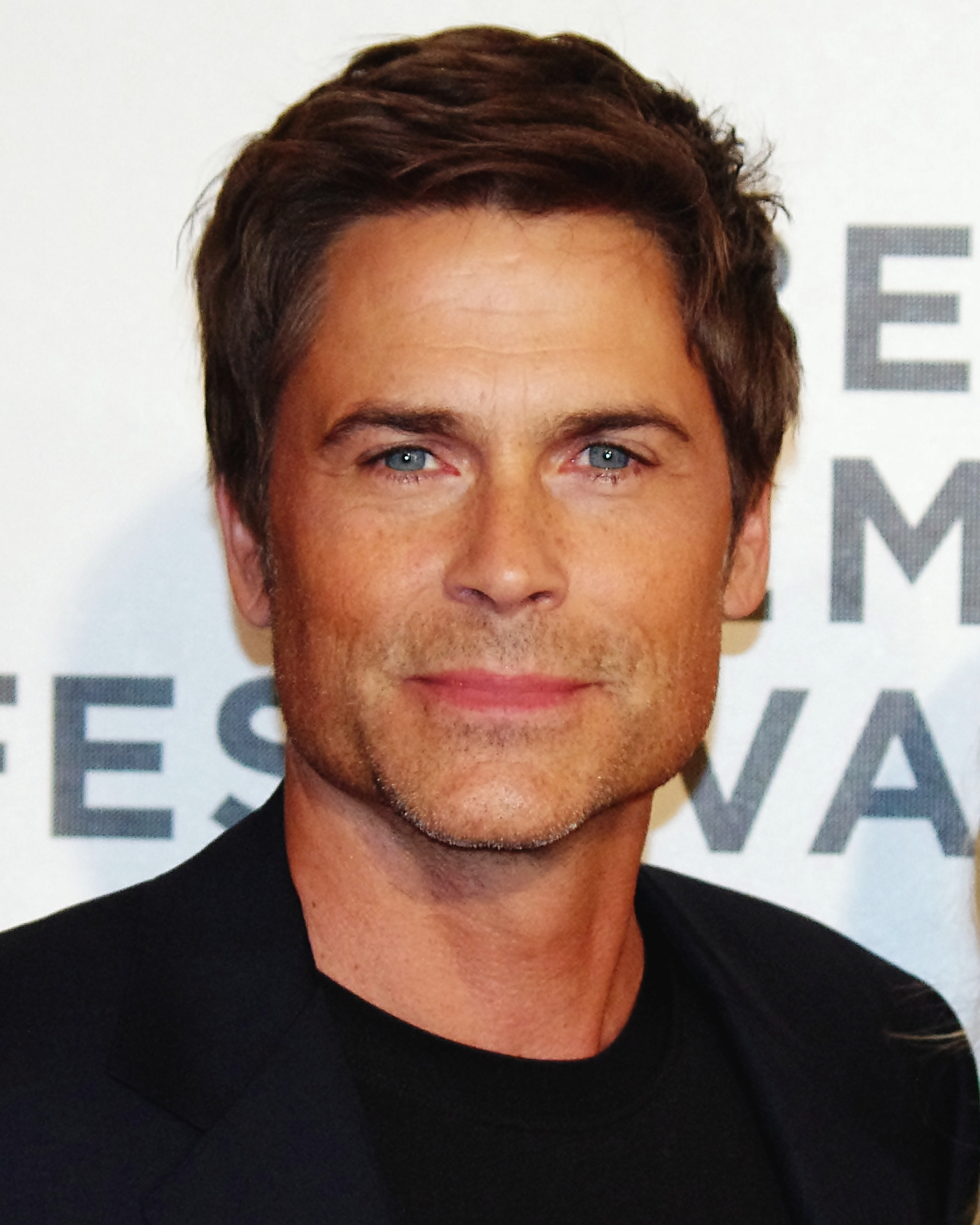
Rob Lowe – host of the game show The Floor

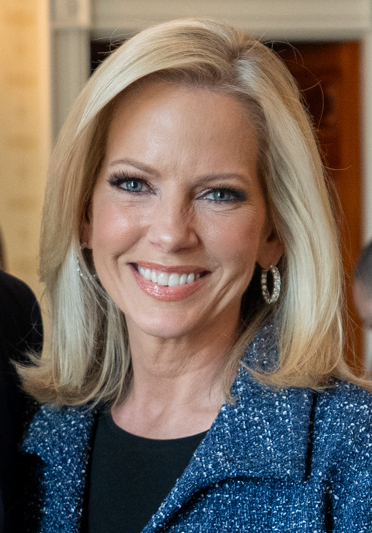
Shannon Bream – host of Fox News Sunday

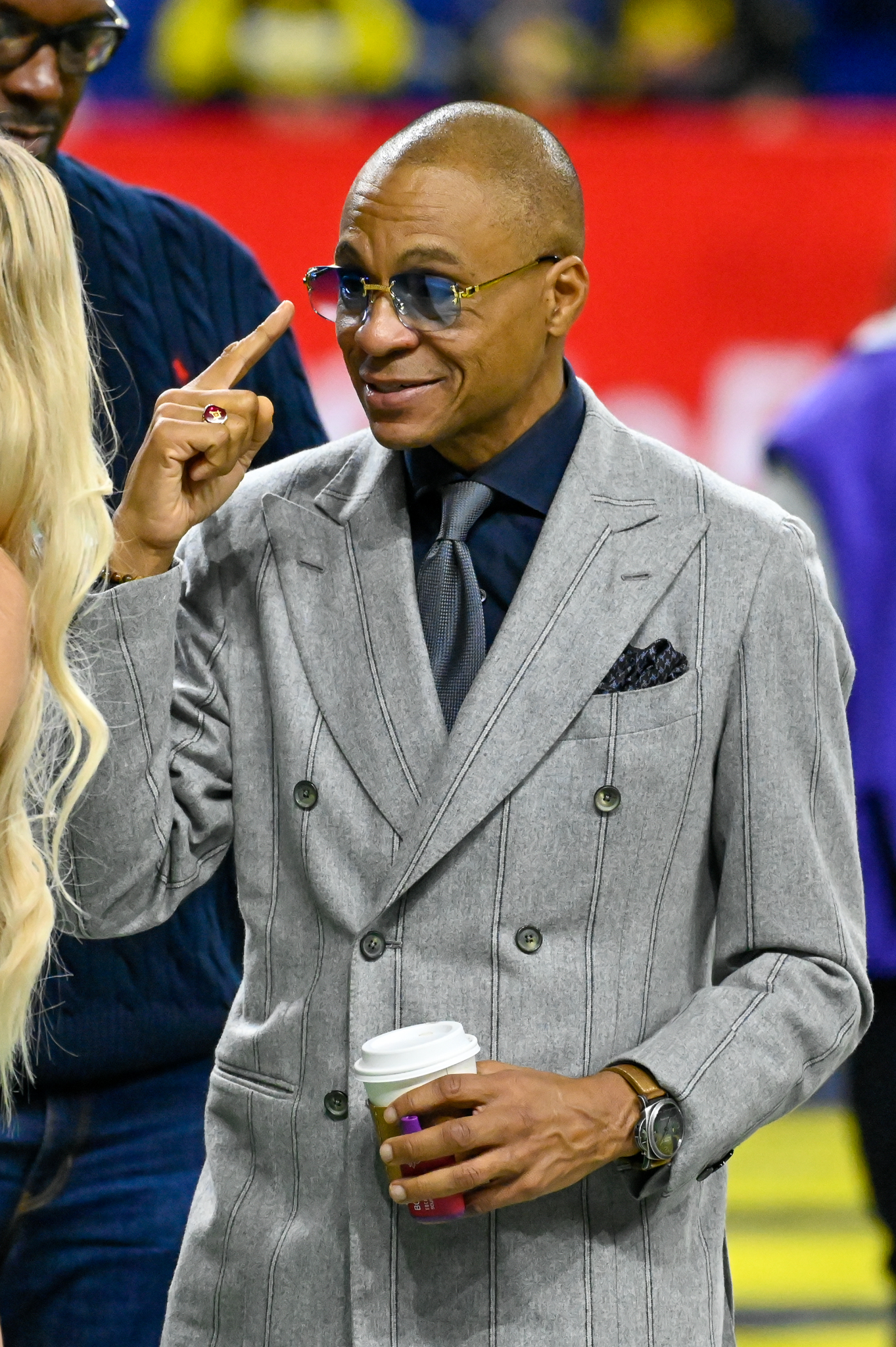
Gus Johnson – announcer for Fox's coverage of college football and college basketball

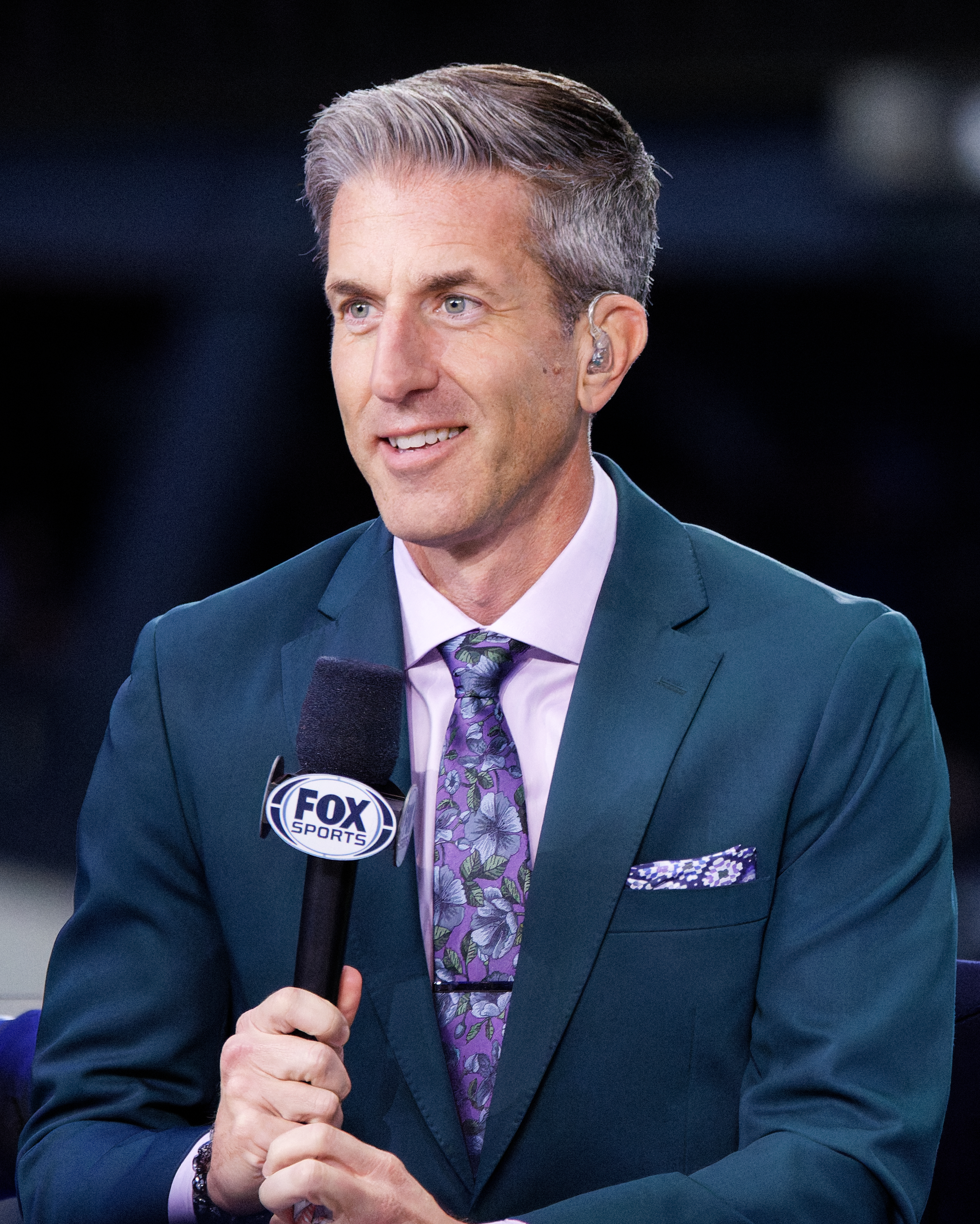
Kevin Burkhardt – announcer for Fox's coverage of the NFL and pregame host for the MLB

=== Drama ===
Title	Genre	Premiere	Seasons	Runtime	Status
Doc	Medical drama	January 7, 2025	3 seasons, 39 episodes	43–44 min	Season 3 ongoing
Memory of a Killer	Crime drama	January 25, 2026	1 season, 10 episodes	42–43 min	Season 2 due to premiere on February 1, 2027
Awaiting release
Baywatch	Action drama	January 6, 2027	1 season, 12 episodes	TBA	Pending
The Interrogator	Crime procedural	February 9, 2027	1 season, 12 episodes	TBA	Pending

=== Comedy ===
Title	Genre	Premiere	Seasons	Runtime	Status
Animal Control	Sitcom	February 16, 2023	4 seasons, 50 episodes	22 min	Season 5 ongoing
Best Medicine	Medical comedy drama	January 4, 2026	2 seasons, 20 episodes	43–44 min	Season 2 ongoing

=== Animation ===
Title	Genre	Premiere	Seasons	Runtime	Status
The Simpsons	Animated sitcom	December 17, 1989	38 seasons, 808 episodes (Note: Eight episodes have been released exclusively on Disney+, bringing the total to 816 as of November 15, 2026.)	21–24 min	Season 38 ongoing Renewed for seasons 39–40
Family Guy	Animated sitcom	January 31, 1999 (Note: The series originally ended on February 14, 2002, but resumed on May 1, 2005.)	24 seasons, 456 episodes (Note: One episode - "Partial Terms of Endearment" - was released exclusively on DVD. Five episodes have been released exclusively on Hulu, bringing the total to 462 as of October 5, 2026. Six episodes have two production codes, bringing the total to 468.)	20–88 min	Renewed for seasons 25–27
American Dad!	Animated sitcom	February 6, 2005 (Note: The series originally ended its run on Fox on September 21, 2014. After airing on TBS from 2014–2025, the series resumed airing on Fox on February 22, 2026.)	12 seasons, 187 episodes (Note: The series' run on TBS brings the season total to 22 and the episode total to 401.)	21–24 min	Renewed for seasons 23–25
Bob's Burgers	Animated sitcom	January 9, 2011	16 seasons, 312 episodes	20–22 min	Renewed for seasons 17–19
Krapopolis	Animated sitcom	September 24, 2023	3 seasons, 58 episodes	22 min	Renewed for seasons 4–5
Grimsburg	Animated sitcom	January 7, 2024	3 seasons, 33 episodes	22 min	Season 3 ongoing
Universal Basic Guys	Animated sitcom	September 8, 2024	3 seasons, 38 episodes	22 min	Season 3 ongoing

=== Unscripted ===
==== Docuseries ====
Title	Subject	Premiere	Seasons	Runtime	Status
TMZ Investigates	Celebrity/conspiracy theories	January 22, 2024	1 season, 8 episodes (Note: The series has aired 14 specials from April 13, 2020, to May 14, 2025.)	43 min	Pending

==== Reality ====
Title	Genre	Premiere	Seasons	Runtime	Status
America's Most Wanted	Reality television	February 7, 1988 (Note: The series originally ended on June 18, 2011, but resumed on March 15, 2021.)	28 seasons, 1,102 episodes (Note: Season 25 aired on Lifetime.)	30–60 min	Pending
Hell's Kitchen	Reality competition	May 30, 2005	25 seasons, 386 episodes	41–44 min	Season 25 ongoing Renewed
Kitchen Nightmares	Reality television	September 19, 2007 (Note: The series originally ended on September 12, 2014, but resumed on September 25, 2023.)	10 seasons, 125 episodes	58 min	Pending
MasterChef	Reality competition	July 27, 2010	16 seasons, 322 episodes	42 min	Renewed
The Masked Singer	Reality competition	January 2, 2019	14 seasons, 174 episodes	41–85 min	Season 15 due to premiere on January 6, 2027
Lego Masters	Reality competition	February 5, 2020	5 seasons, 56 episodes	43 min	Renewed
Crime Scene Kitchen	Reality competition	May 26, 2021	3 seasons, 29 episodes	43 min	Renewed
Next Level Chef	Reality competition	January 2, 2022	5 seasons, 72 episodes	43 min	Season 6 due to premiere on February 18, 2027
Special Forces: World's Toughest Test	Reality television	January 4, 2023	5 seasons, 45 episodes	43 min	Pending
Farmer Wants a Wife	Reality television	March 8, 2023	4 seasons, 44 episodes	43 min	Pending
Extracted	Reality competition	February 10, 2025	2 seasons, 20 episodes	43 min	Season 3 due to premiere on January 7, 2027
Gordon Ramsay's Secret Service	Reality television	May 21, 2025	1 season, 14 episodes	41–43 min	Renewed
The Fixer	Reality television	July 18, 2025	1 season, 8 episodes	42–43 min	Pending
Lego Masters Jr.	Reality competition	August 18, 2025	1 season, 4 episodes	43 min	Pending
Next Level Baker	Reality competition	December 4, 2025	2 seasons, 5 episodes	43 min	Season 2 ongoing Renewed
Fear Factor: House of Fear	Reality competition	January 11, 2026	1 season, 10 episodes	43 min	Renewed

==== Game shows ====
Title	Genre	Premiere	Seasons	Runtime	Status
Don't Forget the Lyrics!	Game show	July 11, 2007 (Note: The series originally ended its run on Fox on June 19, 2009. After airing on syndication from 2010–2011, the series resumed on Fox on May 23, 2022.)	4 seasons, 80 episodes	43 min	Renewed
Beat Shazam	Game show	May 25, 2017	8 seasons, 100 episodes	43 min	Pending
Name That Tune	Game show	January 6, 2021	5 seasons, 77 episodes	42–43 min	Season 6 ongoing
The Floor	Game show	January 2, 2024	6 seasons, 65 episodes	43 min	Season 6 ongoing Renewed
The Quiz with Balls	Game show	May 28, 2024	3 seasons, 34 episodes	42–44 min	Pending
The 1% Club	Game show	June 3, 2024	3 seasons, 39 episodes	43 min	Pending
Celebrity Weakest Link	Game show	September 15, 2025	2 seasons, 18 episodes	43 min	Season 2 ongoing
99 to Beat	Game show	September 21, 2025	2 seasons, 17 episodes	43 min	Season 2 ongoing
Nation's Dumbest	Game show	July 15, 2026	1 season, 10 episodes	43 min	Renewed

=== Co-productions ===
Title	Genre	Partner	Premiere	Seasons	Runtime	Status
Murder in a Small Town	Crime drama	Global/Canada	September 24, 2024	2 seasons, 18 episodes	42 min	Season 3 due to premiere on February 1, 2027

=== Continuations ===
Title	Genre	Prev. network(s)	Premiere	Seasons	Runtime	Status
Bear Grylls Is Running Wild (season 9) (Note: The first six seasons aired under the title Running Wild with Bear Grylls. The seventh and eighth seasons aired under the title Running Wild with Bear Grylls: The Challenge.)	Reality	NBC (seasons 1–4); National Geographic (seasons 5–8)	April 21, 2026	1 season, 8 episodes	43 min	Pending

=== Awards shows ===
Title	Premiere	Status
iHeartRadio Music Awards	March 14, 2019	Ongoing
Billboard Music Awards	December 12, 2024 (Note: Fox previously aired the Billboard Music Awards from December 10, 1990, to December 4, 2006.)	Pending

=== News programming ===
Title	Genre	Premiere	Runtime	Status
Fox News Sunday	Sunday morning talk show	April 28, 1996	60 min	Ongoing

=== Sports programming ===
- Fox College Football, which includes:
  - Big Noon Kickoff
  - The Big Ten Championship Game (odd-numbered years)
  - Saturday Game(s) of the Week (featuring the Big Ten and Big 12 conferences)
- Fox College Hoops, which includes:
  - Big East, Big Ten, and Big 12 regular season games
  - The Big East Men's Basketball Championship
- IndyCar Series on Fox (shared with FS1) which includes:
  - Indianapolis 500
- MLB on Fox, which includes:
  - Baseball Night in America
  - The All Star Game
  - The American League Championship Series (ALCS) (odd numbered years - shared with FS1)
  - The National League Championship Series (NLCS) (even numbered years - shared with FS1)
  - The World Series
- NASCAR on Fox (shared with FS1), which includes:
  - Fox NASCAR Night of Primetime Race
  - Fox NASCAR RACENIGHT Pre Game
  - Fox NASCAR Post Game
  - The Fresh From Florida 250
  - The General Tire 200
  - The Daytona 500
  - The Jack Link's 500
  - The NASCAR All-Star Race (2025-present)
  - Numerous other races (either on Friday & Saturday nights or Saturday & Sunday afternoons)
- NFL on Fox, which includes:
  - Fox NFL Sunday
  - The OT
  - NFC games (and interconference games when the NFC team is the road team)
  - The NFC Championship Game
  - The Super Bowl (every four years)
- Fox Soccer, which includes:
  - UEFA European Championship (once every four years)
  - FIFA World Cup (once every four years)
  - FIFA World Cup on Fox After Hours with James Corden (2026)
  - Major League Soccer (2003–2011; 2015–present)
- Boxing on Fox
- PBA on Fox
- UFL (2024)

== Upcoming programming ==
=== Drama ===
Title	Genre	Premiere	Seasons	Runtime	Status
Highway to Heaven	Fantasy	2027–28 season	TBA	TBA	Series order
Katie Greaves	Legal drama	2027–28 season	TBA	TBA	Series order

=== Comedy ===
Title	Genre	Premiere	Seasons	Runtime	Status
Mammoth	Sitcom	2027–28 season	TBA	TBA	Series order

=== Animation ===
Title	Genre	Premiere	Seasons	Runtime	Status
Stewie	Sitcom	2027–28 season	2 seasons	TBA	Series order

=== Unscripted ===
==== Reality ====
Title	Genre	Premiere	Seasons	Runtime	Status
Marriage Market	Dating show	2026–27 season	TBA	TBA	Series order

=== In development ===
==== Drama ====
- Bewitched
- Billionaire Apocalypse
- Blood Ties
- Borrowed Time
- Cold Blooded Liar
- DEA
- Except You
- The Miracle Department
- Pennies
- Proof
- State Patrol
- Wine & Spirits

==== Comedy ====
- Almost Paradise
- Daddio
- Earthquake
- First Class Friends
- How Can We Help
- Perf
- Thunderjacks
- Untitled Jermaine Fowler series
- Untitled Jim Belushi series
- Untitled Paul Reiser/Adam F. Goldberg series
- Untitled vampire comedy
- Whatever Happened to Huey Lewis

==== Animation ====
- Joe Dirt
- Taskmasters
- Zoo P.D.

==== Reality ====
- The Talent Test
- The X Factor reboot
