= Bento Box Entertainment =

American animation studio

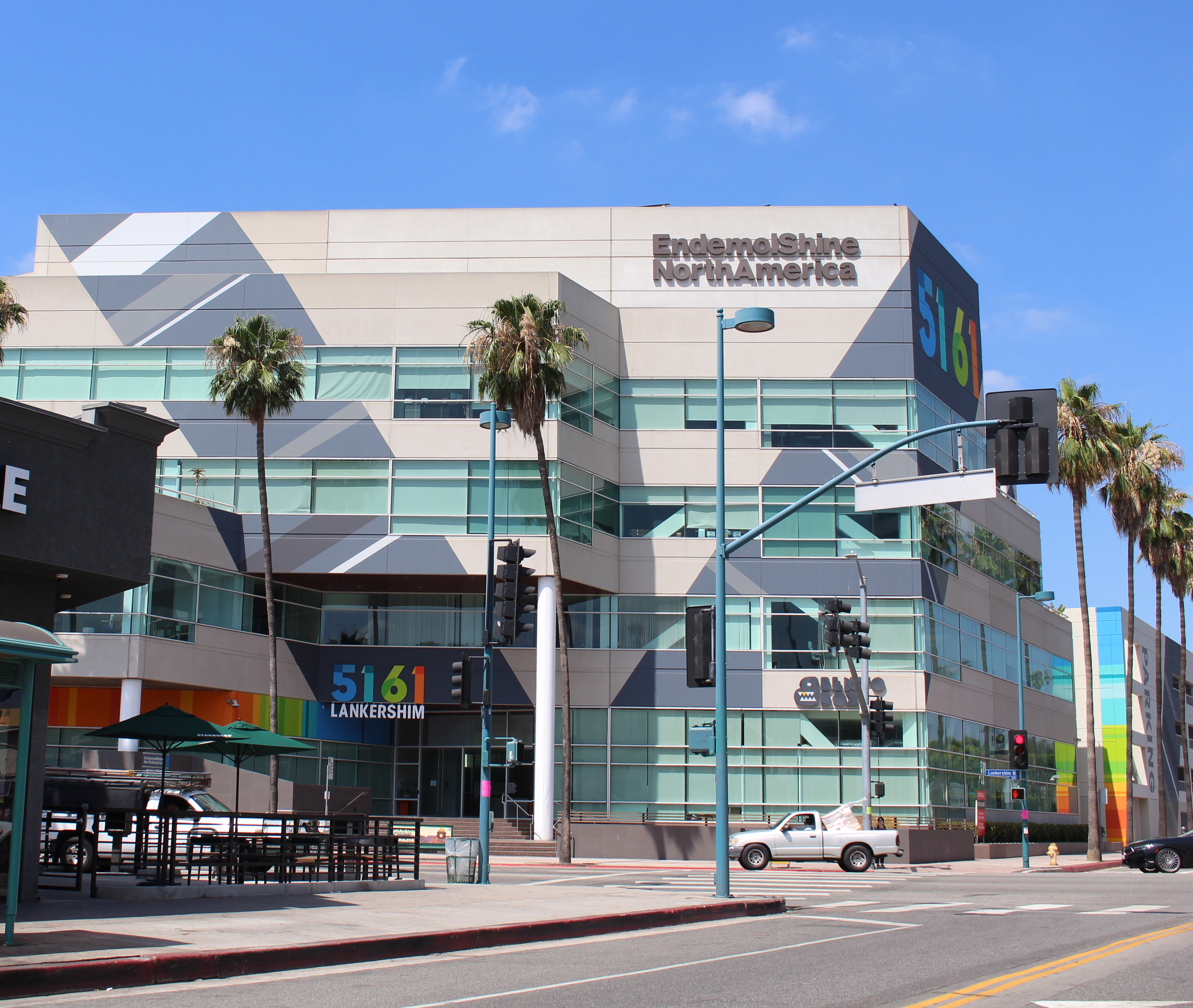
- Headquarters in North Hollywood
- Type: Subsidiary
- Industry: Animation
- Founded: 2009; 17 years ago
- Founder: Scott Greenberg; Joel Kuwahara; Mark McJimsey
- Headquarters: North Hollywood, Los Angeles, California, U.S.
- Key people: Dana Cameron (EVP, head of studio); Michelle Huynh (EVP, content operations); Ben Jones (creative director)
- Products: Television series; Feature films
- Parent: Fox Entertainment (2019–present)
- Subsidiaries: Bento Box Animation Studio Atlanta; Bento Box Canada; Bento Box Interactive; Bento Rights; Princess Bento Studio (Note: Princess Bento Studio is co-owned by Bento Box Entertainment and Australian film and television production company Princess Pictures.)
- Website: www.bentoboxent.com www.bentoboxatl.com www.princessbento.com

Bento Box Entertainment, formerly known as Bento Box Animation, is an American animation studio and entertainment company located in the North Hollywood neighborhood of Los Angeles, California. It was founded in 2009 by executive producers Scott Greenberg, Joel Kuwahara, and Mark McJimsey. It is a subsidiary of Fox Corporation and operates under the Fox Entertainment division. The studio is best known for producing Bob's Burgers for Fox prior to its acquisition in August 2019.

Bento Box Entertainment has four animation studios — in North Hollywood, Burbank, Bento Box Animation Studio Atlanta in Atlanta, Georgia, and Bento Box Canada in Toronto, Ontario. The company also operates Princess Bento Studio, a joint venture with Princess Pictures, in Melbourne, Victoria.

== History ==
On October 11, 2016, Bento Box launched a children's division called Sutikki. Sutikki opened an office in the United Kingdom on March 23, 2017.

On August 6, 2019, it was announced that Fox Corporation would acquire Bento Box, while still allowing it to operate as an independent production house; Sutikki was not part of the acquisition.

On April 8, 2020, it formed a pact with Australian film company Princess Pictures called Princess Bento Studio. Their first series Smiling Friends started airing on Adult Swim on January 10, 2022.

On October 5, 2022, Bento Box's production workers became members of The Animation Guild.

On December 2, 2022, Bento Box signed a multi-year animation service deal with Princess Pictures' newly acquired studio Boulder Media.

On September 12, 2025, founder Joel Kuwahara stepped down from his position as president of production and left the company.

== Productions ==
=== Television series ===
==== Bento Box Entertainment ====
Title	Genre	First air date	Last air date	No. of seasons	Network	Co-production company(s)	Note(s)
As animation service
Neighbors from Hell	Horror-comedy	June 7, 2010	July 26, 2010	1	TBS	20th Century Fox Television, Wounded Poodle and MoonBoy Animation	
Bob's Burgers	Family comedy	January 9, 2011	present	16	Fox	20th Television Animation, Wilo Productions (Season 2–present) and Buck & Millie Productions (Seasons 2–10)	
Allen Gregory	Family comedy	October 30, 2011	December 18, 2011	1	Fox	20th Century Fox Television, Jonah Hill Films, a J. Paul/A. Mogel/D. Goodman Piece of Business and Chernin Entertainment	
Brickleberry	Workplace comedy	September 25, 2012	April 14, 2015	3	Comedy Central	Fox 21 Television Studios, Damn! Show Productions and Black Heart Productions	
Out There	Friendship comedy	February 22, 2013	April 19, 2013	1	IFC	20th Century Fox Television and Quincy Productions	
Perfect Hair Forever	Adventure-comedy	April 1, 2014		1	Adult Swim	Williams Street	episodes 8 and 9 only
Future-Worm!	Science fiction-comedy	May 27, 2015	June 11, 2015	1	Disney XD	Disney Television Animation and Quincy Productions	Shorts only, first children's animated television series animated by the company
Bordertown	Family comedy	January 3, 2016	May 22, 2016	1	Fox	20th Century Fox Television, Fuzzy Door Productions and Hentemann Films	
The Who Was? Show	Sketch comedy	May 11, 2018		1	Netflix	Penguin Random House, FremantleMedia and Matador Content	
Duncanville	Family comedy	February 16, 2020	June 26, 2022	3	Fox	Paper Kite Productions, 3 Arts Entertainment, 20th Television Animation, Fox Entertainment and Universal Television	last six episodes were released on Hulu on October 18, 2022
Central Park	Musical comedy	May 29, 2020	November 18, 2022	3	Apple TV+	20th Television Animation, Angry Child Productions, Wilo Productions and Brillstein Entertainment Partners	
Hoops	Workplace comedy	August 21, 2020		1	Netflix	20th Century Fox Television and Lord Miller Productions	
The Masked Singer	Singing competition	September 23, 2020	December 16, 2020	1	Fox		animated sequences for season 4
The Great North	Family comedy	January 3, 2021	September 14, 2025	5	Fox	20th Television Animation, Double Molyneux Sister Sheux, Wilo Productions and Fox Entertainment	
The Prince	Family comedy	July 29, 2021		1	HBO Max	20th Television and Nickleby, Inc.	
As production company
The Awesomes	Superhero comedy	August 1, 2013	November 3, 2015	3	Hulu	Broadway Video and Sethmaker Shoemeyers Productions	
Legends of Chamberlain Heights	Friendship comedy	September 14, 2016	August 20, 2017	2	Comedy Central	Running with Scissors and TrueStarr Society of Ninjas Incorporated	
Paradise PD	Workplace comedy	August 31, 2018	December 16, 2022	4	Netflix	Damn! Show Productions and Odenkirk Provissiero Entertainment	
Alien News Desk	Science fiction-comedy	February 27, 2019	May 4, 2019	1	Syfy	Broadway Video	
Lazor Wulf	Science fiction-comedy	April 8, 2019	January 11, 2021	2	Adult Swim	Williams Street	season 1 only; season 2 animated by Six Point Harness
HouseBroken	Friendship comedy	May 31, 2021	August 6, 2023	2	Fox	Kapital Entertainment, Merman and AllenDen	
Wolfboy and the Everything Factory	Fantasy	September 24, 2021	September 30, 2022	2	Apple TV+	HitRecord and Toff's Tiny Universe	First children's animated series produced by the company
Saturday Morning All Star Hits!	Sketch comedy	December 10, 2021		1	Netflix	Broadway Video and Universal Television	live action/animated series
Farzar	Science fiction-comedy	July 15, 2022		1	Netflix	Netflix Animation, Damn! Show Productions and Odenkirk Provissiero Entertainment	
Koala Man	Superhero comedy	January 9, 2023		1	Hulu; Disney+ (Australia)	Cusack Creatures, Hermit House, Justin Roiland's Solo Vanity Card Productions!, Princess Pictures and 20th Television Animation	
Mulligan	Science fiction-comedy	May 12, 2023	May 24, 2024	1	Netflix	Little Stranger, Inc., Bevel Gears, Means End Productions, 3 Arts Entertainment and Universal Television	
Krapopolis	Fantasy-comedy	September 24, 2023	present	3	Fox	Fox Entertainment Studios and Harmonious Claptrap	
Grimsburg	Action-comedy	January 7, 2024	present	3	Fox	Gizmotech Industries, The Jackal Group and Fox Entertainment Studios	
Hazbin Hotel	Musical comedy	January 19, 2024	present	2	YouTube (Pilot); Amazon Prime Video (Series)	SpindleHorse, A24 and Amazon MGM Studios	Pilot released on October 28, 2019
Universal Basic Guys	Situation comedy	September 8, 2024	present	3	Fox	Mutsack, One Man Canoe, Sony Pictures Television and Fox Entertainment Studios	Currently distributed by Sony Pictures Television
Dad's House	Family comedy	2027			Netflix	Cusack Creatures and Princess Pictures	
Daddy Issues	Friendship comedy				Fox	Fox Entertainment	Based on the podcast of the same name
Gumby	Comedy			TBA			Based on the franchise of the same name
Gumby Kids	Comedy			TBA			Second children's animated series produced by the company; Based on the franchise of the same name
HAVOC!	Superhero comedy				Fox	CRE84U Entertainment	
Taskmasters	Workplace comedy				Fox		
Zoo P.D.	Workplace comedy				Fox	Kapital Entertainment	

==== Sutikki ====
Title	First air date	Last air date	No. of seasons	Network	Note(s)
Moon and Me	February 3, 2019	January 27, 2020	2	CBeebies	First and only Sutikki series

=== Short-form series ===
Title	Years	Site	Notes
Glove and Boots	2010–2018	YouTube	Show originally a local production in New York from 2004 until 2006. The show was acquired by Moonbug Entertainment in 2019.
Kuroba	2018–2019	YouTube	co-production with WildBrain
Dogs Playing Poker	2021	Fox	co-production with Fox Entertainment
Best Fiends Shorts	2021–2022	YouTube	co-production with Seriously
Aquadonk Side Pieces	2022	YouTube	co-production with Williams Street
Cow Squad	2026	YouTube	co-production with Chick-fil-A

=== Direct-to-video animated films ===
Release date	Title	Notes
March 18, 2014	Achmed Saves America	co-production with Levity Entertainment Group
January 20, 2015	Madea's Tough Love	co-production with Tyler Perry Studios
November 8, 2022	Aqua Teen Forever: Plantasm	co-production with Williams Street

=== Specials ===
Release date	Title	Network	Notes
October 28, 2017	The David S. Pumpkins Halloween Special	NBC	co-production with Universal Television, SNL Studios and Broadway Video
February 1, 2023	Yenor (pilot)	Adult Swim	co-production with Williams Street
May 30, 2025	Lulu Is a Rhinoceros	Apple TV+	co-production with Propagate Content; First children's animated special produced by the company

=== Theatrical films ===
Release date	Title	Notes
May 27, 2022	The Bob's Burgers Movie	First theatrical film co-production with 20th Century Animation

=== Streaming films ===
Release date	Title	Notes
May 21, 2023	Pastacolypse	First streaming film co-production with Fox Entertainment Studios
August 13, 2023	Millennial Hunter	
November 12, 2023	Big Bruh	

=== Music videos ===
Title	Year	Artist	Director(s)
A New Wave	2015	Sleater-Kinney	Bernard Derriman
A L I E N S	2017	Coldplay	Ben Jones; Diane Martel
Genius	2018	LSD	Ben Jones

== Bento Box Interactive ==
Bento Box Interactive is an entertainment-based technology company launched in 2012 by Bento Box Entertainment. In October 2012, Bento Box Interactive partnered with Alicia Keys to create an education mobile application entitled "The Journals of Mama Mae and LeeLee" for iOS devices. The application tells the story of the relationship between a young New York City girl and her wise grandmother and features two original songs by Keys, "Follow the Moon" and "Unlock Yourself". In 2012 Bento Box Interactive acquired the rights to the Sweet Pickles books and rereleased them as ebooks with sound effects, narration and character voices by voice actors.

== See also ==
- Disney General Entertainment Content
  - 20th Television Animation
- Animation on Fox
- Fox Corporation
  - Animation Domination
  - Fox Entertainment
