= Animation Domination =

Programming block of animated TV series

- Promotional image featuring the block's lineup as of 2026. Clockwise from top left: Bob and Louise Belcher from Bob's Burgers, Marvin Flute from Grimsburg, Mark and Tammy Hoagies from Universal Basic Guys, Stupendous and Tyrannis from Krapopolis, Stan Smith and Klaus Heisler from American Dad!, Lisa and Homer Simpson from The Simpsons, and Brian, Stewie (riding Brian) and Peter Griffin from Family Guy.
- Network: Fox
- Launched: First run: May 1, 2005; 21 years ago Second run: September 29, 2019; 7 years ago
- Closed: First run: September 21, 2014; 12 years ago
- Country of origin: United States

Animation Domination (also called AniDom, Fox AD, and AD) is an American animated programming block that has aired in two iterations on the Fox broadcast network, featuring a lineup solely made up of prime-time animated sitcoms and adult animation carried as a majority of, or the whole of, the network's Sunday evening schedule (outside of sports pre-emptions and early hour programming burn offs). It originally ran from May 1, 2005, until September 21, 2014, before returning on September 29, 2019.

== History ==
=== First run ===
Animation Domination debuted on Fox on May 1, 2005, in time for the last sweeps period of the 2004–05 television season. The first program to originate on the block was American Dad!, although its pilot aired as a Super Bowl lead-out program on February 6, 2005. Rounding out the Animation Domination lineup alongside American Dad! were The Simpsons (the longest-running cartoon on Fox and the network's first primetime animated series, which predated the lineup by 16 years), King of the Hill (which predated the lineup by eight years) and Family Guy (which predated the lineup by six years, and was revived as a series three years after its 2002 cancellation as a result of newfound popularity through reruns on Fox lineup and sales of the first, second, and third-season episodes on DVD).

Until spring 2010, when Animation Domination consisted only of animated series, live-action programming was also present within the block, including shows like Malcolm in the Middle and The War at Home. King of the Hill later ended on September 13, 2009, on Fox, and was replaced by the Family Guy spin-off The Cleveland Show for the 2009–10 television season, with the former's time slot of 8:30 PM. Four episodes of the series remained, but Fox opted not to air them, later being burn-offed in syndication from May 3–6, 2010. Fox would later premiere Bob's Burgers on January 9, 2011.

From the fall of 2014 to the summer of 2017, the Animation Domination block was replaced by the Sunday Funday block, with the addition of live-action comedies Brooklyn Nine-Nine (which moved to Sunday night for its second season), freshman series Mulaney (which was canceled in early 2015), and the Will Forte sitcom, The Last Man on Earth. This marked the first time that the network has regularly aired live-action comedies on Sundays (outside of burn-offs of failed weeknight series) since 2005. From fall of 2017 to the summer of 2019, the Sunday night lineup was simply referred to as Fox Sunday Night, also with the addition of live-action comedies.

=== Return ===
The block returned on September 29, 2019, with previous AD series The Simpsons, Bob's Burgers, Family Guy and the new series Bless the Harts. Duncanville debuted on February 16, 2020.

James Arnold Taylor currently serves as the announcer of the block.

In April 2020, Fox Entertainment announced their partnership with Caffeine to produce the AniDom Beyond Show, a recap show hosted by Andy Richter. The show aired its finale on May 18, 2020.

The Great North debuted on January 3, 2021.

On May 31, 2021, Animation Domination temporarily expanded into Mondays with Duncanville and the new series HouseBroken.

Two new animated series – Krapopolis and Grimsburg – were originally set to premiere in the 2022–23 season, but were pushed back to the 2023–24 season. They were each renewed for a second in October 2022.

On January 18, 2022, Fox announced they would be eyeing a two-hour Monday block in May 2023. In 2024, Family Guy was temporarily moved to Wednesdays, and in the summer of 2025, the three-hour Sunday lineup was temporarily changed to a two-hour Thursday lineup (while reairs of primetime programming normally aired on Thursdays during summer were moved to Sundays).

Bless the Harts ended after two seasons on June 20, 2021. A year later, on June 30, 2022, Fox cancelled Duncanville after three seasons and the series concluded on October 18, 2022, with its final six episodes on Hulu.

The Simpsons, Family Guy and Bob's Burgers were each renewed for two more seasons through 2025 on January 26, 2023.

On March 1, 2023, Krapopolis was renewed for a third season ahead of its premiere on September 24. Grimsburg premiered on January 7, 2024. HouseBroken was canceled on May 10, 2024, after two seasons. On May 13, 2024, Universal Basic Guys was renewed for a second season ahead of its debut on September 8. On July 25, 2024, Krapopolis was renewed for a fourth season, ahead of the show's second-season premiere.

On February 16, 2025, the whole lineup was delayed by two hours due to rain delays during the 2025 Daytona 500 and The Great North aired a repeat of its fifth-season premiere.

On March 21, 2025, it was announced that plans were being made to return American Dad!, which moved to TBS in 2014, back to Fox's Animation Domination lineup, where it would air alongside The Simpsons, Family Guy and Bob's Burgers. On April 2, 2025, The Simpsons, Family Guy and Bob's Burgers were each renewed for four seasons and American Dad! was confirmed to be returning to Fox, also for four seasons.

On May 10, 2025, Fox renewed Grimsburg, Krapopolis and Universal Basic Guys.

On September 23, 2025, Aimee Steinberger, a director on The Great North, posted on Bluesky that the show had been cancelled after five seasons. On October 3, 2025, Fox made the cancellation of The Great North official.

On February 22, 2026, American Dad! returned to Fox with the premiere of its 22nd season.

On March 12, 2026, Fox ordered a second spin-off of Family Guy centered on Stewie Griffin entitled Stewie for the 2027–28 season.

On November 13, 2026, it was announced that Family Guy, Bob's Burgers, American Dad!, and Krapopolis will likely premiere on Fox on February 14, 2027, after the Super Bowl LXI game.

== Programming ==
=== Current programming ===
Title	Premiere date	Time slot	Note
The Simpsons (Note: Debuted on December 17, 1989)	May 1, 2005	Sundays at 8:00PM	Previously aired as part of Fox Sunday Night / Sunday Funday
Family Guy (Note: Debuted on January 31, 1999)	May 1, 2005	Sundays at 8:00 PM on Winter	Previously aired as part of Fox Sunday Night / Sunday Funday
American Dad! (Note: Debuted on February 6, 2005)	May 1, 2005	Sundays at 9:00 PM on Winter	Aired on TBS from 2014 to 2025; returned to Fox on February 22, 2026
Bob's Burgers	January 9, 2011	Sundays at 8:30 PM on Winter	Previously aired as part of Fox Sunday Night / Sunday Funday
Krapopolis	September 24, 2023	Sundays at 9:30 PM on Winter	Season 4 to air Midseason 2027
Grimsburg	January 7, 2024	Sundays at 9:30PM	Season 3 premiered on September 27
Universal Basic Guys	September 8, 2024	Sundays at 9:00PM	Season 3 premiered on September 27

=== Former programming ===
Title	Premiere date	End date	Status
King of the Hill	May 1, 2005 (Note: Debuted on January 12, 1997)	September 13, 2009	Ended; revived on Hulu.
Sit Down, Shut Up	April 19, 2009	May 10, 2009	Cancelled; last nine episodes were released on Saturdays at midnight from later until November 21, 2009.
The Cleveland Show	September 27, 2009	May 19, 2013	Cancelled
Allen Gregory	October 30, 2011	December 18, 2011	Cancelled
Napoleon Dynamite	January 15, 2012	March 4, 2012	Cancelled
Axe Cop	July 21, 2013		Special preview / aired on ADHD
High School USA!	July 21, 2013		Special preview / aired on ADHD
Bless the Harts	September 29, 2019	June 20, 2021	Cancelled
Duncanville	February 16, 2020	June 26, 2022	Cancelled; last six episodes debuted on Hulu on October 18, 2022.
HouseBroken	May 31, 2021	August 6, 2023	Cancelled
The Great North	January 3, 2021	September 14, 2025	This show has ended with five premiered seasons and was cancelled on October 27, 2025.

=== Upcoming programming ===
Title	Premiere date
Stewie	2027 or 2028

== Previous lineups ==
=== 2004/05 ===
Season	7:00 p.m.	7:30 p.m.	8:00 p.m.	8:30 p.m.	9:00 p.m.	9:30 p.m.
Spring	King of the Hill	Regular programming	The Simpsons		Family Guy	American Dad!
Late spring	Regular programming	King of the Hill (R)	The Simpsons		Family Guy	American Dad!
Summer	Regular programming	King of the Hill (R)	The Simpsons (R)	Regular programming	Family Guy	American Dad!
Mid-summer	Regular programming	King of the Hill (R)	The Simpsons (R)		Family Guy	American Dad!

=== 2005/06 ===
Season	7:00 p.m.	7:30 p.m.	8:00 p.m.	8:30 p.m.	9:00 p.m.	9:30 p.m.
Fall	Regular programming	King of the Hill	The Simpsons	Regular programming	Family Guy	American Dad!
Winter	Regular programming	King of the Hill	The Simpsons	Regular programming	Family Guy	American Dad!
Summer	Regular programming	King of the Hill	The Simpsons	American Dad! (R)	Family Guy	Regular programming

=== 2006/07 ===
Season	7:00 p.m.	7:30 p.m.	8:00 p.m.	8:30 p.m.	9:00 p.m.	9:30 p.m.
Fall	The Simpsons (R)	Regular programming	The Simpsons	American Dad!	Family Guy	Regular programming
Late fall	American Dad! (R)	The Simpsons (R)	The Simpsons	American Dad!	Family Guy	Regular programming
Winter	Regular programming		The Simpsons	King of the Hill	Family Guy	American Dad!
Spring	King of the Hill (R)	King of the Hill	The Simpsons	The Simpsons (R)	Family Guy	American Dad!
Summer	Regular programming	King of the Hill	The Simpsons	American Dad! (R)	Family Guy (R)	

=== 2007/08 ===
Season	7:00 p.m.	7:30 p.m.	8:00 p.m.	8:30 p.m.	9:00 p.m.	9:30 p.m.
Fall	King of the Hill (R)	The Simpsons (R)	The Simpsons	King of the Hill	Family Guy	American Dad!
Winter	Regular programming		The Simpsons	King of the Hill	Family Guy	American Dad!
Spring	King of the Hill (R)	American Dad! (R)	The Simpsons	King of the Hill	Family Guy	American Dad!
Mid-spring	King of the Hill (R)	The Simpsons (R)	The Simpsons	King of the Hill	Family Guy	American Dad!
Late spring	Regular programming		The Simpsons	King of the Hill	Family Guy	American Dad!

=== 2008/09 ===
Season	7:00 p.m.	7:30 p.m.	8:00 p.m.	8:30 p.m.	9:00 p.m.	9:30 p.m.
Fall	King of the Hill (R)		The Simpsons	King of the Hill	Family Guy	American Dad!
Winter	Regular programming		The Simpsons	King of the Hill	Family Guy	American Dad!
Spring	American Dad! (R)	King of the Hill (R)	The Simpsons	King of the Hill	Family Guy	American Dad!
Mid-spring	American Dad! (R)	King of the Hill	The Simpsons	Sit Down, Shut Up	Family Guy	American Dad!
Late spring	King of the Hill (R)	American Dad! (R)	The Simpsons	King of the Hill	Family Guy	American Dad!
Summer	Regular programming	American Dad! (R)	The Simpsons	King of the Hill	Family Guy	The Simpsons (R)
Mid-summer	Regular programming	American Dad! (R)	The Simpsons (R)		Family Guy	American Dad! (R)

=== 2009/10 ===
Sunday

Season	7:00 p.m.	7:30 p.m.	8:00 p.m.	8:30 p.m.	9:00 p.m.	9:30 p.m.
Fall	Regular programming		The Simpsons	The Cleveland Show	Family Guy	American Dad!
Spring	Regular programming	The Simpsons (R)	The Simpsons	The Cleveland Show	Family Guy	American Dad!
Summer	Regular programming	American Dad! (R)	The Simpsons	The Cleveland Show	Family Guy (R)	
Mid-summer	American Dad! (R)	The Simpsons (R)		The Cleveland Show	Family Guy (R)	

Saturday

Season	11:00 p.m	11:30 p.m.	12:00 a.m.
Fall	Regular programming		Sit Down, Shut Up

=== 2010/11 ===
Season	7:00 p.m.	7:30 p.m.	8:00 p.m.	8:30 p.m.	9:00 p.m.	9:30 p.m.
Fall	The Simpsons (R)		The Simpsons	The Cleveland Show	Family Guy	American Dad!
Winter	The Simpsons (R)	American Dad!	The Simpsons	Bob's Burgers	Family Guy	The Cleveland Show
Spring	The Simpsons (R)	American Dad!	The Simpsons	Bob's Burgers	Family Guy	The Cleveland Show
Summer	American Dad! (R)	Bob's Burgers (R)	The Simpsons	The Cleveland Show (R)	Family Guy	American Dad! (R)

=== 2011/12 ===
Season	7:00 p.m.	7:30 p.m.	8:00 p.m.	8:30 p.m.	9:00 p.m.	9:30 p.m.
Fall	Regular programming		The Simpsons	The Cleveland Show	Family Guy	American Dad!
Mid-fall	Regular programming	The Cleveland Show	The Simpsons	Allen Gregory	Family Guy	American Dad!
Winter	Bob's Burgers (R)	The Cleveland Show	The Simpsons	Napoleon Dynamite	Family Guy	American Dad!
Spring	The Simpsons (R)	The Cleveland Show	The Simpsons	Bob's Burgers	Family Guy	American Dad!
Late spring	American Dad! (R)	The Cleveland Show	The Simpsons	Bob's Burgers	Family Guy	American Dad!
Summer	American Dad! (R)	The Cleveland Show	The Simpsons	The Simpsons (R)	Family Guy	Family Guy (R)

=== 2012/13 ===
Season	7:00 p.m.	7:30 p.m.	8:00 p.m.	8:30 p.m.	9:00 p.m.	9:30 p.m.
Fall	Regular programming	The Cleveland Show	The Simpsons	Bob's Burgers	Family Guy	American Dad!
Winter	Bob's Burgers (R)	The Cleveland Show	The Simpsons	Bob's Burgers	Family Guy	American Dad!
Spring	Bob's Burgers (R)	The Cleveland Show	The Simpsons	Bob's Burgers	Family Guy	American Dad!
Summer	The Cleveland Show (R)	American Dad! (R)	The Simpsons	Bob's Burgers	Family Guy	Family Guy (R)
Mid-summer	The Cleveland Show (R)	The Simpsons (R)	The Simpsons	Bob's Burgers	Family Guy	American Dad! (R)
Late summer	American Dad! (R)	The Simpsons (R)	The Simpsons	Bob's Burgers	Family Guy	Family Guy (R)

=== 2013/14 ===
Season	7:00 p.m.	7:30 p.m.	8:00 p.m.	8:30 p.m.	9:00 p.m.	9:30 p.m.
Fall	Regular programming		The Simpsons	Bob's Burgers	Family Guy	American Dad!
Winter	Bob's Burgers	American Dad!	The Simpsons	Bob's Burgers	Family Guy	American Dad!
Spring	Bob's Burgers	American Dad!	The Simpsons	Family Guy	Regular programming	
Summer	Regular programming	American Dad!	The Simpsons	Family Guy	Regular programming	
Mid-summer	American Dad! (R)	Bob's Burgers (R)	The Simpsons	The Simpsons (R)	Family Guy (R)	American Dad! (R)

=== 2019/20 ===
Season	7:00 p.m.	7:30 p.m.	8:00 p.m.	8:30 p.m.	9:00 p.m.	9:30 p.m.
Fall	The Simpsons (R)	Bob's Burgers (R)	The Simpsons	Bless the Harts	Bob's Burgers	Family Guy
Winter	The Simpsons (R)	Bob's Burgers (R)	The Simpsons	Duncanville	Bob's Burgers	Family Guy
Summer	Regular programming	Duncanville (R)	The Simpsons	Bless the Harts (R)	Bob's Burgers	Family Guy

=== 2020/21 ===
Sunday

Season	7:00 p.m.	7:30 p.m.	8:00 p.m.	8:30 p.m.	9:00 p.m.	9:30 p.m.
Fall	The Simpsons (R)	Bob's Burgers (R)	The Simpsons	Bless the Harts	Bob's Burgers	Family Guy
Winter	Regular programming	Bless the Harts	The Simpsons	The Great North	Bob's Burgers	Family Guy
Spring	The Simpsons (R)	Bless the Harts	The Simpsons	The Great North	Bob's Burgers	Family Guy
Summer	Duncanville (R)	HouseBroken (R)	The Simpsons	The Great North	Bob's Burgers	Family Guy
Late summer	Regular programming		The Simpsons	The Great North	Bob's Burgers	Family Guy

Monday

Season	8:00 p.m	8:30 p.m.	9:00 p.m.	9:30 p.m.
Summer	Regular programming		HouseBroken	Duncanville

=== 2021/22 ===
Season	7:00 p.m.	7:30 p.m.	8:00 p.m.	8:30 p.m.	9:00 p.m.	9:30 p.m.
Fall	Regular programming		The Simpsons	The Great North	Bob's Burgers	Family Guy
Winter	The Simpsons (R)	Regular programming	The Simpsons	The Great North	Bob's Burgers	Family Guy
Spring	The Simpsons (R)	Duncanville	The Simpsons	The Great North	Bob's Burgers	Family Guy
Late spring	Regular programming		The Simpsons	Bob's Burgers (R)	Duncanville	Family Guy
Summer	Regular programming		The Simpsons	The Great North (R)	Bob's Burgers (R)	Family Guy

=== 2022/23 ===
Season	7:00 p.m.	7:30 p.m.	8:00 p.m.	8:30 p.m.	9:00 p.m.	9:30 p.m.
Fall	Regular programming		The Simpsons	The Great North	Bob's Burgers	Family Guy
Winter	Regular programming		The Simpsons	The Great North	Bob's Burgers	Family Guy
Spring	Regular programming		The Simpsons	The Great North	Bob's Burgers	HouseBroken
Summer	Regular programming		The Simpsons	Family Guy (R)	HouseBroken	HouseBroken
Mid-summer	Regular programming		The Simpsons	Family Guy (R)	Bob's Burgers (R)	Family Guy (R)

=== 2023/24 ===
Sunday

Season	7:00 p.m.	7:30 p.m.	8:00 p.m.	8:30 p.m.	9:00 p.m.	9:30 p.m.
Fall	The Simpsons (R)	Bob's Burgers (R)	The Simpsons	Krapopolis	Bob's Burgers	Family Guy
Winter	Regular programming		The Simpsons	Krapopolis	The Great North	Grimsburg
Summer	Regular programming		Krapopolis (R)			

Wednesday

Season	8:00 p.m.	8:30 p.m.	9:00 p.m.	9:30 p.m.
Winter	Regular programming			Family Guy

=== 2024/25 ===
Sunday

Season	7:00 p.m.	7:30 p.m.	8:00 p.m.	8:30 p.m.	9:00 p.m.	9:30 p.m.
Fall	Bob's Burgers (R)	Krapopolis (R)	The Simpsons	Universal Basic Guys	Bob's Burgers	Krapopolis
Winter	Regular programming		Family Guy	Grimsburg	The Great North	Krapopolis
Spring	Regular programming		The Simpsons	Family Guy	Krapopolis	The Great North

Thursday

Season	8:00 p.m.	8:30 p.m.	9:00 p.m.	9:30 p.m.
Late spring	Bob's Burgers	Grimsburg	Family Guy	The Great North

=== 2025/26 ===
Season	7:00 p.m.	7:30 p.m.	8:00 p.m.	8:30 p.m.	9:00 p.m.	9:30 p.m.
Fall	Krapopolis (R)	The Simpsons (R)	The Simpsons	Universal Basic Guys	Krapopolis	Bob's Burgers
Winter	Regular programming		Family Guy	Universal Basic Guys	American Dad!	Family Guy
Mid-spring	Regular programming		Family Guy	Bob's Burgers	American Dad!	Animation Domination Encores (R)
Summer	Regular programming		The Simpsons (R)	Regular programming	Universal Basic Guys (R)	Grimsburg (R)

== Current lineup ==
Season	7:00 p.m.	7:30 p.m.	8:00 p.m.	8:30 p.m.	9:00 p.m.	9:30 p.m.
Fall	Regular programming	Universal Basic Guys (R)	The Simpsons	Regular programming	Universal Basic Guys	Grimsburg

Notes

- On October 11, 2026, the lineup was preempted by Game 1 of the National League Championship Series.
- On November 8 & 15, 2026, The Simpsons aired at 8:30 p.m. after Animal Control.

== Animation Domination High-Def ==
On January 8, 2013, Fox announced that it would launch an adult animation spin-off to its Sunday evening block called Animation Domination High-Def (ADHD). It originally broadcast on Saturday evenings for 90 minutes from 11:00 p.m. to 12:30 a.m. local time in most markets. It was later reduced to 11:00 p.m. to 12:00 a.m. on September 7, 2013, with the 12:00 a.m. half-hour being given back to its owned-and-operated stations and affiliates to carry other programming. Some of its affiliates delayed the block by 30 minutes to an hour to run late evening newscasts (sports overruns occasionally caused further delays).

The last edition of ADHD on Fox aired on March 5, 2016, with the new Lonely Island sketch comedy series Party Over Here to premiere in the slot on March 12.

== See also ==
- List of programs broadcast by Fox
- Animation on Fox
- Fox Sunday Night – the Fox Sunday lineup from 2014 to 2019
- 20th Television Animation
- Bento Box Entertainment
- Animation Throwdown: The Quest for Cards
- Warped Kart Racers
- Night of the Hurricane – the first (and, as of 2011, only) Animation Domination crossover event
