= General Tire 200 =

General Tire 200 may refer to several ARCA Menards Series races:

- ARCA races at Daytona, a race at Daytona International Speedway, first held in 1964
- General Tire 200 (Talladega), a race at Talladega Superspeedway, first held in 1969
- General Tire 200 (Sonoma), a race at Sonoma Raceway, first held in 1969 as well
- General Tire Delivers 200, a race at Pocono Raceway, first in 1969, and renamed for 2022
