= Bordertown (American TV series) =

American animated sitcom

- Genre: Animated sitcom
- Created by: Mark Hentemann
- Voices of: Hank Azaria; Nicholas Gonzalez; Alex Borstein; Judah Friedlander; Missi Pyle; Jacqueline Piñol; Efren Ramirez; Carlos Alazraqui
- Composer: Mark Mothersbaugh
- Country of origin: United States
- Original language: English
- No. of seasons: 1
- No. of episodes: 13

Production
- Executive producers: Mark Hentemann; Seth MacFarlane
- Producers: Valentina L. Garza; B.J. Porter
- Editor: Donnell Ebarrete
- Running time: 20–22 minutes
- Production companies: Bento Box Entertainment; Hentemann Films; Fuzzy Door Productions; 20th Century Fox Television

Original release
- Network: Fox
- Release: January 3 – May 22, 2016

Bordertown is an American adult animated sitcom that aired on Fox from January 3 to May 22, 2016. The series follows two families living in a Southwest desert town on the United States–Mexico border. Bordertown is a joint production by Bento Box Entertainment, (Note: Animation outsourced to Hanho Heung-Up Co., Ltd. and Yearim Productions Co., Ltd..) Fuzzy Door Productions, 20th Century Fox Television, Hentemann Films and syndicated by 20th Television. On May 12, 2016, the series was canceled after only one season due to low ratings.

== Plot ==
Bordertown takes place in the fictitious town of Mexifornia (which is on the border of California and Mexico). Mexifornia is based on the town of Calexico, California, sharing a similar location and dynamic as Mexifornia. The two main characters are Bud Buckwald and Ernesto Gonzalez. Bud is a border agent living at 25200 Cedar Road with his wife, Janice Buckwald, and their three children, Sanford, Becky and Gert. Living next door to him is Ernesto Gonzalez, an ambitious immigrant and family man, who has been in the country less than 10 years and is happy to be with his family in the United States of America.

== Voice cast ==
- Hank Azaria as Bud Buckwald, a Border Patrol agent.
- Nicholas Gonzalez as the following:
  - Ernesto Gonzalez, Bud's Mexican neighbor who's been living in Mexifornia for 20 years.
  - J.C. Gonzalez (Juan Carlos), Ernesto and Maria's 21-year-old college graduate nephew and Becky's fiancé.
  - Pablo Barracuda, the biggest drug lord in Mexifornia.
- Alex Borstein as the following:
  - Janice Buckwald, Bud's wife and Becky, Sanford and Gert's mother.
  - Becky Buckwald, Bud's 18-year-old daughter and J.C.'s fiancée.
- Judah Friedlander as Sanford Buckwald, Janice and Bud's 24-year-old rebellious son. In the episode "American Doll", it's revealed that Sanford was born on a skip day; February 32, which is why he's never had any birthdays. In the same episode, it is hinted that Sanford is just a cover name and that his real name is Vince though this was previously hinted at in the episode "Groundhog Day" .
- Missi Pyle as Gert Buckwald, Bud and Janice's 5-year-old daughter who is a beauty pageant contestant.
- Jacqueline Piñol as Pepito Gonzalez, Ernesto and Maria's youngest son who pranks Bud regularly.
- Efren Ramirez as Ruiz Gonzalez, Maria and Ernesto's eldest son.
- Carlos Alazraqui as the following:
  - Placido Gonzalez, Ernesto's undocumented father who is cranky.
  - El Coyote, a Mexican trickster and people smuggler who always tries to cross the border and regularly taunts Bud in the cold openings.

== Episodes ==
No.	Title	Directed by	Written by	Original release date	Prod. code	US viewers (millions)
1	"The Engagement"	Jacob Hair	Mark Hentemann & Lalo Alcaraz	January 3, 2016	1AXH01	2.34
Border patrol officer Bud Buckwald is furious when he learns that his daughter, Becky, is engaged to Ernesto Gonzalez's college-educated activist nephew, J.C., whom she has been dating for four years. He is soon delighted when an anti-immigration law is passed that leads to J.C.'s deportation. Realizing that he wants Becky to be happy, Bud enlists Ernesto's help to bring J.C. back.
2	"Borderwall"	Albert Calleros	Mark Hentemann & Lalo Alcaraz	January 10, 2016	1AXH06	3.58
Bud uses confiscated drug money to build a border wall, but when it destroys the economy and costs him his job, he starts smuggling aliens under the wall.
3	"Megachurch"	Gavin Dell	Valentina L. Garza	January 17, 2016	1AXH08	2.57
Reverend Fantastic, the corrupt, yet happy-go-lucky preacher of Bud's megachurch, wants Bud to recruit Ernesto in hopes of collecting more money from the growing Mexican population. While Ernesto is initially enchanted by the megachurch's beauty, Maria finds it very annoying. Meanwhile, Becky tries to find out why J.C. doesn't like church, and is convinced that J.C. was molested when Maria tells Becky that J.C. went on a religious camping trip and came back the next day, declaring that there is no God.
4	"High School Football"	Jack Perkins	Dan Vebber	February 14, 2016	1AXH03	1.70
When Bud is hired as the new high school football coach, he's so desperate to win that he doesn't realize that the illegal immigrant he recruits is Pablo Barracuda's #1 drug mule.
5	"Groundhog Day"	Oreste Canestrelli	Kenny Byerly	February 21, 2016	1AXH05	1.72
The Mexifornia population tips from white majority to Latino majority when Maria's sister has a baby, so Bud tries to get romantic so he can have sex with Janice. However, when Janice reveals that a trampoline accident has made her infertile and J.C. suffers from racial guilt over being a majority (and, in his eyes, an oppressor), the Buckwalds move to a whites-only reservation.
6	"J.C. Strikes"	Gavin Dell	Michael Kennedy & Nathaniel Stein	March 13, 2016	1AXH11	2.16
Frustrated that J.C. still hasn't gotten a job, Ernesto hires him as part of his landscaping crew. When the job turns out too difficult, J.C. unionizes Ernesto's workers and begins a strike. Meanwhile, an ostrich stalks Bud and becomes his spirit animal, which Gert doesn't like.
7	"Drug Lord"	Albert Calleros	Mark Hentemann	April 3, 2016	1AXH02	1.00
Bud competes to be more successful than Ernesto, and ends up as the inside man for drug kingpin Pablo Barracuda at the Border Station.
8	"Santa Ana Winds"	Jacob Hair	Jason Reich	April 10, 2016	1AXH13	1.19
The Santa Ana winds lead to a series of strange events in Mexifornia, such as Sanford and Ernesto's son Ruiz traveling to Mexico to find a new explosive energy drink that Sanford becomes a scriptwriter extraordinaire from, Ernesto battling a satanic leaf refusing to leave the ground, and Bud meeting a Mexican version of him who steals his life, all of which J.C. is determined to find the meaning for.
9	"Heart Attack"	Oreste Canestrelli	Alex Carter	April 17, 2016	1AXH12	1.19
Gert has a heart attack during a pageant when Bud makes her binge on junk food. Unable to get help for her in Mexifornia, he only has one resort left: Mexico.
10	"Wildfire"	Jacob Hair	B. J. Porter	April 24, 2016	1AXH07	1.16
Bud refuses to evacuate when a wildfire threatens Mexifornia, so Ernesto comes to the rescue once the Buckwald house starts to burn. Meanwhile, J.C. and Becky see what it's like to date other people before committing to one another.
11	"La Fiesta Noche Show"	Ray Claffey	Vanessa Ramos	May 8, 2016	1AXH10	1.08
Bud becomes a celebrity in the Mexican community, thanks to his anger at a taping for the long-running Spanish variety show La Fiesta Noche.
12	"American Doll"	Jack Perkins	Susan Hurwitz Arneson	May 15, 2016	1AXH09	1.30
Janice is forced to get a job as Ernesto's housekeeper after Bud secretly spends $800 on an American Doll for Gert and maxes out the credit card on accessories. Meanwhile, Gert plots revenge against the American Doll company while Bud plans to get Janice fired, and Mario Lopez is chosen to be the first Mexican-American in space. Note: Peter Griffin from Family Guy makes a cameo appearance at the start of this episode. Additionally, the Buckwalds' house is said to be built over the set of The Cleveland Show, placing Bordertown in the same universe as Family Guy, The Cleveland Show and American Dad!
13	"Viva Coyote"	Ray Claffey	Gustavo Arellano	May 22, 2016	1AXH04	1.16
Bud and Pablo Barracuda each try to catch El Coyote for different reasons.

== Production ==
=== Producers ===
Seth MacFarlane and Mark Hentemann were announced as executive producers. Shortly afterwards, Alex Carter and Dan Vebber were announced as co-executive producers. Lalo Alcaraz and Gustavo Arellano are consulting producers, and Valentina L. Garza is a supervising producer.

=== Writing ===
There were thirteen writers who worked on Bordertown. Mark Hentemann wrote or co-wrote three episodes. Lalo Alcaraz co-wrote the first two episodes.

== Broadcast ==
In the United States, the series premiered midseason on January 3, 2016, on Fox. The series was picked up by ITV2 in the United Kingdom on March 23, 2015, to premiere on February 29, 2016 – immediately after the new season of Family Guy on the same channel.

The series was also picked up by Network Ten in Australia and started airing on February 3, 2016, on its sister channel, Eleven. In Canada, it was broadcast on City.

== Reception ==
The first and only season of Bordertown received mixed to negative reviews from critics. On Metacritic, it has a weighted average score of 46 out of 100 based on 15 reviews, which indicates "mixed or average reviews". On Rotten Tomatoes, the series' first and only season has an approval rating of 39% based on 18 reviews, with an average rating of 5.28/10. The critics' consensus reads: "Bordertown's controversy-rich premise is an idea disappointingly ill-served by its execution, which repeatedly mistakes crass, desperate gags for topical humor."
