= Grimsburg =

2024 American adult animated sitcom

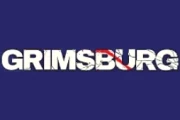
- Genre: Adult animation; Animated sitcom; Black comedy; Action comedy; Police procedural
- Created by: Catlan McClelland; Matthew Schlissel
- Developed by: Chadd Gindin
- Showrunner: Chadd Gindin
- Starring: Jon Hamm; Greg Chun; Rachel Dratch; Erinn Hayes; Kevin Michael Richardson; Alan Tudyk
- Composer: Jesse Novak
- Country of origin: United States
- Original language: English
- No. of seasons: 3
- No. of episodes: 33

Production
- Executive producers: Chadd Gindin; Gail Berman; Hend Baghdady; Jon Hamm; Connie Tavel; Catlan McClelland (Note: McClelland and Schlissel were co-executive producers in season one and executive producers in season two, later becoming consultants in season three.); Matthew Schlissel
- Running time: 22 minutes
- Production companies: Gizmotech Industries; The Jackal Group; Fox Entertainment Animation (Note: Credited as Fox Entertainment Studios for first season and Fox Entertainment for second season)

Original release
- Network: Fox
- Release: January 7, 2024 – present

Grimsburg is an American animated sitcom created by Catlan McClelland and Matthew Schlissel for the Fox Broadcasting Company. Before its first-season premiere, the series was renewed for a second season in October 2022. The series premiered on the Animation Domination programming block on January 7, 2024. The first season concluded on May 12, 2024 and the second season premiered on February 16, 2025. The second season concluded on July 17, 2025. In May 2025, the series was renewed for a third season which premiered on September 27, 2026.

== Premise ==
The series takes place in the town of Grimsburg, where detective Marvin Flute may be the greatest detective, but cannot figure out his own family.

== Voice cast ==
The main characters of Grimsburg (From top to bottom) Stan Flute, Dr. Rufis Pentos, Lt. John Kang, Marvin Flute, Det. Greg Summers, and Harmony Flute.

=== Main ===
- Jon Hamm as Det. Marvin Flute, Grimsburg's finest detective who is Stan's estranged father and Harmony's ex-husband. He returns to his hometown to try to solve the greatest mysteries: himself and his family.
- Greg Chun as Lt. John Kang, Marvin's mentor who teaches him important lessons about detective work.
- Rachel Dratch as Stan Flute, Marvin and Harmony's son who is trying to get his parents back together.
- Erinn Hayes as Harmony Flute, Marvin's ex-wife and Stan's mother who was raised by bears, and has a job as an anchor woman.
- Kevin Michael Richardson as Det. Greg Summers, a newer member who became a cyborg after an accident involving a carousel. It is revealed in season 2 that Summers was actually a worker for the carousel rather than a cop before the accident. The cyborg procedure was supposed to be for an actual cop but mistakenly went to Summers.
- Alan Tudyk as
  - Dr. Rufis Pentos, Marvin's former music teacher-turned-nemesis.
  - Mr. Flesh, Stan's imaginary friend, who appears to Stan in order to get him to do something bad or crazy.

=== Recurring ===
- Wendi McLendon-Covey (season 1) as Chief Stamos, Marvin's boss and the former chief of the Grimsburg Police Department. She had a silent cameo in the season 2 episode, "CrimeCon".
- Kaniehtiio Horn as Wynona Whitecloud, a mortician and Summers’ love interest
- Rosie Perez as Martina Martinez who takes over as the chief of the Grimsburg Police Department in season 2.
- Jaime Camil as Mayor Dilquez, the mayor of Grimsburg
- Debi Derryberry as Teague Hilton, leader of the Stable Boys clique who bullies Stan.
- Natalie Palamides as Khaleesi, the popular girl at Grimsburg Middle School
- Martin Short (seasons 2) and David Cross (season 3) as Otis Volcanowitz, the newest detective at the Grimsburg police department

=== Guest voices ===
- Patton Oswalt as Stinky the Camp Slasher
- Rob Huebel
- Ronny Chieng
- Toks Olagundoye
- Brian Jordan Alvarez
- Tim Meadows as Alistair Chadwell, the host of the murder express.
- Piotr Michael as McSnuff / Paul Giamatti / Garfield / Damien Flesher
- Andrés du Bouchet
- Chadd Gindlin
- Ross Marquand as Timmy Tommy
- Amy Sedaris as Lil Betsy
- Christina Hendricks as Anna
- Asif Ali as Lt. Ravi
- Cheri Oteri as Doris
- Tom Segura as Buddy
- Kiernan Shipka as Mo11y
- Sherry Cola as Charlotte Kang
- J. K. Simmons as Mitchell Flute, Marvin's Father.
- Joel McHale as Junior
- Tina Fey as Herself
- Anna Osceola as Bridget
- Jonathan Kite as Chuck Noland
- Neil Magnuson
- Yara Martinez as Martinez
- Danny Mastrogiorgio
- Danny Trejo as Tino
- Melissa Villasenor
- Tara Strong as Nedward
- David Herman
- Scott Menville
- E.G. Daily
- Cree Summer as Abigail
- Carlos Alazraqui
- Tru Valentino
- Lamorne Morris
- Laraine Newman
- Timothy Simons

== Episodes ==
=== Series overview ===
Season	Episodes	Originally released	
Season	Episodes	First released	Last released
1	13	January 7, 2024	May 12, 2024
2	13	February 16, 2025	July 17, 2025
3	TBA	September 27, 2026	TBA

=== Season 1 (2024) ===
No. overall	No. in season	Title	Directed by	Written by	Original release date	Prod. code	U.S. viewers (millions)
1	1	"Pilot"	Roy Burdine	Catlan McClelland & Matthew Schlissel	January 7, 2024	1BBGR01	2.46
Marvin works to track down a missing teenage girl after her romantic interest is discovered decapitated along the side of the road.
2	2	"The Flute Show"	T.G. Hopkins	Jonathan Green & Gabe Miller	February 18, 2024	1BBGR03	0.39
Marvin's investigation into an unknown serial killer is interrupted by a production crew who's in town to turn the case into a true crime limited series.
3	3	"McSnuff the Mystery Mutt"	Roy Burdine	Siena East	February 25, 2024	1BBGR05	0.47
After being forced to take a desk role in the office, Flute decides to lead a double-life and become a dog-themed superhero named McSnuff.
4	4	"The Flute-itive"	Caitlin VanArsdale	Christina Friel & Connor Wright	March 3, 2024	1BBGR08	0.46
Flute enters the Grimsburg Miniature Competition and is accused of murdering the judge after he disqualifies him.
5	5	"Say Yes to the Death"	Roy Burdine	Catlan McClelland & Matthew Schlissel	March 10, 2024	1BBGR09	0.41
Flute and the team go under cover at a wedding to find the bouquet-catcher killer.
6	6	"Murder on the Splurt Express"	T.G. Hopkins	Christina Friel & Connor Wright	March 17, 2024	1BBGR11	0.48
A swanky murder mystery party turns into a real investigation when the wealthy host is suspiciously found dead.
7	7	"Camp Slasher"	Caitlin VanArsdale	Laura Krafft	March 24, 2024	1BBGR10	0.52
Flute and the team get the campy horror movie experience when, after a series of counselors are found murdered, they attempt to make the town's summer camp slasher-proof.
8	8	"Manchine"	Orlando Gumatay	Laura Krafft	April 7, 2024	1BBGR04	0.44
In a failed attempt to catch "The Cartwheel Killer," Marvin is eager for a new partner who won't slow him down.
9	9	"The Funaways"	T.G. Hopkins	Andrés Du Bouchet	April 14, 2024	1BBGR06	0.46
In an attempt to stop Marvin from forgetting about him, Stan and Dr. Pentos create a diabolical plan staging his disappearance.
10	10	"The Big Trouble with Lil' Betsy"	Mark Garcia	Miles Woods	April 21, 2024	1BBGR07	0.54
Marvin and the team investigate the death of a morning TV host, in which former child star Lil' Betsy is the main suspect.
11	11	"And the Winner Is... Murder!"	Caitlin VanArsdale	Catlan McClelland & Matthew Schlissel & Chadd Gindin	April 28, 2024	1BBGR02	0.42
Marvin finds himself at the judging table of the town's talent show when a serial killer targets the winner.
12	12	"Younger Games"	Mark Garcia	Jonathan Green & Gabe Miller	May 5, 2024	1BBGR12	0.45
In an attempt to become immortal, Marvin drinks a special potion that causes rapid de-aging.
13	13	"The Danish Dilemma"	Roy Burdine	Chadd Gindin & Kirsten Rezazadeh-Jakob	May 12, 2024	1BBGR13	0.38
On a day where murder seems to be on the low, the biggest of Marvin's problems is his missing danish.

=== Season 2 (2025) ===
No. overall	No. in season	Title	Directed by	Written by	Original release date	Prod. code	U.S. viewers (millions)
14	1	"Haunted Housewife"	T.G. Hopkins	John Viener	February 16, 2025	2BBGR03	0.81
15	2	"Mo11y"	Mark Garcia	Gabe Miller & Jonathan Green	February 23, 2025	2BBGR01	0.66
16	3	"Training Wheels Day"	T.G. Hopkins	Tom Kauffman	March 2, 2025	2BBGR08	0.51
17	4	"Granddaddy Issues"	Roy Burdine	Elizabeth Tippet	March 9, 2025	2BBGR05	0.52
18	5	"Daddy Daddy Bang Bang"	Orlando Gumatay	John Viener	March 16, 2025	2BBGR09	0.44
19	6	"CrimeCon"	Mark Garcia	Christina Friel & Connor Wright	March 23, 2025	2BBGR04	0.46
20	7	"Crystal Ball"	Orlando Gumatay	Siena East	April 30, 2025	2BBGR11	0.43
21	8	"Blue Light District"	Mark Garcia	Catlan McClelland & Matthew Schlissel	May 29, 2025	2BBGR07	0.43
22	9	"The Undies"	Roy Burdine	Elizabeth Tippet	June 5, 2025	2BBGR10	0.40
23	10	"Loosey Goosey"	Orlando Gumatay	Siena East	June 12, 2025	2BBGR02	0.60
24	11	"Evidence Locker"	T.G. Hopkins	Andrés Du Bouchet	June 19, 2025	2BBGR06	0.46
Volleyball (Rufis Pentos' Story) — Guitar Pick (Marvin Flute's Story) — Carousel Pony Head (Greg Summer's Story) —
25	12	"How to Lose an Ankle Monitor in 10 Days"	T.G. Hopkins	Matthew Libman & Daniel Libman	July 10, 2025	2BBGR12	0.46
26	13	"Across the Flutiverse"	Roy Burdine	Gabe Miller & Jonathan Green	July 17, 2025	2BBGR13	0.43

=== Season 3 (2026) ===
No. overall	No. in season	Title	Directed by	Written by	Original release date	Prod. code	U.S. viewers (millions)
27	1	"The Zast of Zus"	T.G. Hopkins	Gabe Miller & Jonathan Green	September 27, 2026	3BBGR02	0.50
28	2	"Stanbiscuit"	T.G. Hopkins	Lauren Bans	October 4, 2026	3BBGR03	0.58
29	3	"Breaking Badly"	Roy Burdine	Erik Durbin	October 18, 2026	3BBGR06	N/A
30	4	"How the Other Half Lives"	Roy Burdine	John Viener	October 25, 2026	3BBGR01	TBD
31	5	"CrimeShare"	Mark Garcia	Catlan McClelland & Matthew Schlissel	November 1, 2026	3BBGR07	TBD
32	6	"Flutey Friday"	Orlando Gumatay	Siena East	November 8, 2026	3BBGR04	TBD
33	7	"Evidence Locker II"	Mark Garcia	Siena East and Christina Friel & Connor Wright	November 15, 2026	3BBGR11	TBD
Microphone (Harmony Flute's Story) — Playbill (Rufis Pentos' Story) — Wooden Case Box (John Kang's Story) —
34	8	"Fur Force"	TBA	TBA	November 22, 2026	TBA	TBD
35	9	"Tech Sematary"	TBA	TBA	November 29, 2026	TBA	TBD
36	10	"The Fluteyguard"	TBA	TBA	December 6, 2026	TBA	TBD
37	11	"Buzz Kill"	TBA	TBA	December 13, 2026	TBA	TBD
38	12	"Maternal Affairs"	TBA	TBA	December 20, 2026	TBA	TBD
39	13	"Prostate of Mind"	TBA	TBA	December 27, 2026	TBA	TBD

== Production ==
In October 2021, Fox ordered Grimsburg straight-to-series. Bento Box Entertainment is the animation studio.

In October 2022, Fox renewed it for a second season, ahead of its premiere on January 7, 2024.

In May 2025, the series was renewed for a third season which premiered on September 27, 2026.

== Distribution ==
In the United Kingdom, Sky One acquired the series, on which it premiered on 31 July 2026.

== Reception ==
The review aggregator website Rotten Tomatoes reported a 63% approval rating based on 8 critic reviews. Metacritic, which uses a weighted average, assigned a score of 58 out of 100 based on 6 critics, indicating "mixed or average reviews".
