= Universal Basic Guys =

American adult animated sitcom

- Promotional poster for the first season
- Genre: Animated sitcom Farce
- Created by: Adam Malamut & Craig Malamut
- Showrunners: Dan Lagana; Rob Rosell
- Voices of: Adam Malamut; Talia Genevieve; Fred Armisen; Dana Snyder
- Theme music composer: Adam Malamut & Craig Malamut
- Composers: Alejandro Valencia & René Garza Aldape
- Country of origin: United States
- Original language: English
- No. of seasons: 3
- No. of episodes: 38

Production
- Executive producers: Adam Malamut; Craig Malamut; Dan Lagana; Rob Rosell; Shane Kosakowski
- Editors: Ramon Samson; Scott Henry
- Running time: 22 minutes
- Production companies: Mutsack; One Man Canoe (Note: Season 1); Mediazhka (Note: Season 2); Sony Pictures Television; Bento Box Entertainment; Fox Entertainment Animation (Note: Credited as Fox Entertainment for season 1)

Original release
- Network: Fox
- Release: September 8, 2024 – present

Universal Basic Guys is an American animated sitcom created by Adam and Craig Malamut that premiered on September 8, 2024, on Fox. The show centers on a group of South Jersey factory workers who are enrolled in a universal basic income pilot program when their jobs are taken over by AI-powered robots, and left with a monthly income and a lot of free time to get into trouble. In May 2025, ahead of the second season premiere, the series was renewed for a third season. The second season premiered on September 28, 2025. The third season premiered on September 27, 2026.

== Plot ==
Mark and Hank Hoagies are two guys who used to work in a factory until they were dismissed upon their positions being replaced by AI-powered robots. With a monthly income and a lot of free time upon joining the universal basic income pilot program, they end up getting into trouble and a lot of misadventures with the people they know getting involved in some way.

== Cast and characters ==
=== Main ===
- Adam Malamut as
  - Markus "Mark" Hoagies, a proud, carefree and idiotic middle-aged man with a frat-boy persona who often causes trouble wherever he goes whenever he feels slighted. To make matters worse, he's too stubborn to listen to good advice and follow proper procedures.
  - Henry "Hank" Hoagies, Mark's simple-minded but sensible younger brother who is well-liked by most people because of his stark contrast to the impulsive Mark. He is also Mark's partner-in-crime and loves hot-dogs.
  - Mernft Man, one of Mark's friends, who has connections with the underworld. In the "Go Fund Mernft" episode it's revealed his real name is Scott Myfrynski.
  - Artie Muldonich, one of Mark and Hank's fellow laid off co-workers at the factory. Known for his vast collection of junk metals and spare parts, Mark will often recruit Artie for one of his ill-conceived home improvement projects such as digging his own well or building Mark a robot suit.
- Talia Genevieve as Tammy, Mark's down-to-earth wife who works as a nurse and was married once before. Tammy shares custody of her teenage son, Darren, with her ex-husband, who is Darren's primary caretaker.
- Fred Armisen as David, Mark and Tammy's neurotic neighbor and a wannabe author who often gets caught up in their antics
- Dana Snyder as Rhoda Hoagies, Mark and Hank's mother, introduced in season 3

=== Recurring ===
- Craig Malamut as various minor characters
- Ally Maki as Andrea, David's stern and domineering Asian-American wife with whom he often has unnecessary dramatic confrontations
- Brandon Wardell as Darren, Tammy's emotionally withdrawn half-Filipino 14-year-old son and Mark's stepson who often visits her and Mark, while ex-divorced husband has primary custody. Darren spends most of his time playing video games
- Tommy Pope as Steven "Steve" DelVecchio, Mark's obnoxious rival who is much more successful and seizes any opportunity he can to gloat to Mark about it
- Jon Glaser as the Jersey Devil, the legendary mythical winged creature whom Mark and Darren befriend and later plays on Mark's short-lived hockey team called The Goofballs
- Joe Lo Truglio as Mr. Bouchard, a childhood friend of Mark, who is now Darren's high school history teacher

== Episodes ==
=== Series overview ===
Season	Episodes	Originally released	
Season	Episodes	First released	Last released
1	13	September 8, 2024	December 29, 2024
2	18	September 28, 2025	April 12, 2026
3	TBA	September 27, 2026	TBA

=== Season 1 (2024) ===
No. overall	No. in season	Title	Directed by	Written by	Original release date	Prod. code	U.S. viewers (millions)
1	1	"Pet Projects"	Nick Simpson	Adam Malamut & Craig Malamut	September 8, 2024	1BBHG03	4.03
Wanting to one-up a birthday gift that one of Tammy's co-workers got, Mark and Hank buy her a sickly-looking chimpanzee which soon rips off Mark's face. David tries to help Murph when an exotic pet python he got tries to kill him.
2	2	"Sunset Cruise"	Martin Cormier	Chris Garcia	September 15, 2024	1BBHG06	0.66
Mark, Tammy, Hank, David and Andrea all take a cruise where each of them has their own adventure, Mark tries fishing to show up rival Steve DelVecchio, Tammy wants to do karaoke, David wants Andrea to take a break from work and Hank gets stood-up on a date.
3	3	"The Devil You Know"	Nick Simpson	Adam Malamut & Craig Malamut	September 22, 2024	1BBHG08	1.33
Mark's attempts at bonding with his step-son Darren lead to them and Hank coming face-to-face with the Jersey Devil. David ends up receiving a sex-doll package belonging to Mark and he keeps trying to deny ownership to anyone who confronts him over it. Without a trace or even a warning, the Jersey Devil escapes and step-son Darren spends the rest of his life pondering what could have been if he had just taken the Jersey Devil's offer to become his bust boy.
4	4	"Guy's Day"	Martin Cormier	Dan Lagana	September 29, 2024	1BBHG07	0.71
Mark and his friends attempt to join an exclusive men-centric country club. Tammy ends up discovering a secret about the wives of the men's club.
5	5	"Jaws of Life"	Katie Dyson	Lucas Gardner	October 6, 2024	1BBHG04	0.67
After Tammy saves a man from choking, Mark tries to prove he is capable of being just as heroic, but he repeatedly humiliates himself in front of a bunch of firefighters. Tammy soon finds out that the guy she saved, Paul, has become obsessed with her. Mark is done trying to be a hero and Paul is saved by a certain firefighter who becomes his "new hero", at the restaurant is it soon revealed that the firefighter killed Paul with an ax after he invaded his home through the chimney.
6	6	"Bird Cage"	Andrew Bowler	Adam Malamut & Craig Malamut	October 20, 2024	1BBHG02	3.87
While attending a football game, Mark's attempts at rubbing elbows with the football heads and with a fake Super Bowl ring leads to him becoming the new coach and Hank becoming the new mascot. David tries to enjoy the game, but is quite out-of-touch with the fans.
7	7	"Fight or Flight"	Rania Tabet	Laura Moran	October 27, 2024	1BBHG05	0.72
Mark and Hank and Tammy take a plane to Florida to attend a relatives's funeral, but Mark accidentally gets the pilots killed and his attempts at taking over lead to him butting heads with ground control while Hank is forced to not board the plane when he is mistaken for a terrorist by Airport Security and Tammy fights with a rude passenger. David tries to bond with his phoneaholic niece and nephew (the children of Andrea's sister) to convince Andrea to consider parenthood.
8	8	"Poconos"	Rania Tabet	Lucas Gardner	November 3, 2024	1BBHG09	1.40
David needs to write a new novel from scratch, so Mark lets him use his dead uncle's cabin in the Pocono Mountains for solitude to write the book, but Mark and his family end up taking a retreat to the cabin as well, distracting Davi. Eventually though, the Hoagies get trapped in a Jumanji-esque situation when they play a cursed board game.
9	9	"Mr. Cupcake Man"	Rania Tabet	Laura Moran	November 10, 2024	1BBHG10	0.61
Mark adopts a new children's entertainer persona, but overreacts due to hate comments and tries too hard that the resulting attention brings out the worst in him. Andrea plans to use Mark's newfound fame to help with a problem at her job.
10	10	"Mark Men"	Katie Dyson	Chris Garcia	November 24, 2024	1BBHG11	1.44
Mark and Hank get a job at an advertising agency, Mark is being irresponsible and lazy while Hank gets a promotion. Tammy clashes with Mernft Man when he attempts to cut the life line on a Russian mobster he in indebted to, but reconsiders it in order to save children's lives.
11	11	"Sheet Shock"	Nick Simpson	Dan Lagana	December 8, 2024	1BBHG12	3.44
When Mark and Hank attempt to join the army, Mark's inability to not even make the bed leaves him traumatized. David befriends a veteran after the latter simply complimented him, but soon comes to believe that the veteran is crazy as his story sounds similar to different fictions, until he gets the real evidence.
12	12	"Deer Stakes"	Martin Cormier	Adam Malamut & Craig Malamut	December 15, 2024	1BBHG01	2.29
Mark and Hank goes on a deer hunting and they meet with their former colleague Doug, Doug is secretly a murderer and tries to murder them but Mark accidentally murders him with the crossbow. David struggles to stop a deer from eating his garden and gets help that works too well.
13	13	"Water Ice Shoppe"	Katie Dyson	Adam Malamut & Craig Malamut	December 29, 2024	1BBHG13	1.49
After ruining his father's restaurant and finances in the late '90s, Mark goes into business with Gary & Barry's Water Ice Shoppe during their annual winter closure, but Mark ends up repeating it. Hank lets the homeless man Vernon live the public bathrooms, and Vernon gets back on his feet that he returns the favor to Hank by saving the store and with Mark's idea to make the store go all year long.

=== Season 2 (2025–26) ===
No. overall	No. in season	Title	Directed by	Written by	Original release date	Prod. code	U.S. viewers (millions)
14	1	"The Goofballs"	Katie Dyson	Shane Kosakowski	September 28, 2025	2BBHG03	0.69
15	2	"I Am Jar"	Martin Cormier	Rachel Kaly	October 5, 2025	2BBHG05	1.44
16	3	"Golden Beans"	Katie Dyson	Rob Rosell	October 19, 2025	2BBHG07	1.76
Upset that their coffee shop has been bought by a Dallas company, Mark and David open their own coffee shop in the garage. After tasting coffee beans from Colombia, they travel to the country, where they find themselves in a Predator situation. Tammy wants to listen to customers romance and believes that Mernft Man is being judgemental.
17	4	"Down the Shore"	Rania Tabet	Rebecca Addelman	October 26, 2025	2BBHG06	0.72
18	5	"Well Done"	Martin Cormier	Rebecca Addelman	November 2, 2025	2BBHG02	0.78
19	6	"Hoagie Jones"	Mark Sheard	Adam Malamut & Craig Malamut	November 9, 2025	2BBHG04	3.29
20	7	"Medieval Knights"	Martin Cormier	Annabel Seymour	November 16, 2025	2BBHG09	0.58
21	8	"Spectrum Slam"	Mark Sheard	Shane Kosakowski	November 23, 2025	2BBHG08	5.08
Mark and Hank participate in Spectrum Slam, a basketball charity game for Autism Awareness, but they are rivaled with Steve and his nephew Andrew. Mark thinks he can beat Steve, who is using steroids, by infecting himself with rabies from a rabid raccoon, but Mark quickly starts to turn into a feral beast himself. Meanwhile, David tries to find a teammate and ends up with a jerkish man in a wheelchair.
22	9	"Machine Yearning"	Rania Tabet	Rachel Kaly	November 30, 2025	2BBHG01	N/A
23	10	"Good Marks"	Katie Dyson	Zachary Rice	December 7, 2025	2BBHG10	N/A
24	11	"Two Marks"	Martin Cormier & Katie Dyson	Shane Kosakowski	December 14, 2025	2BBHG13	N/A
25	12	"Skyboys"	Mark Sheard	Annabel Seymour	December 21, 2025	2BBHG11	N/A
26	13	"Little the Netherlands"	Mark Sheard	Jen Jackson	February 15, 2026	2BBHG15	N/A
27	14	"Shorty Hoagies"	Katie Dyson	Lucas Gardner	February 22, 2026	2BBHG17	N/A
28	15	"Go Fund Mernft"	Rania Tabet	Noah Prestwich	March 1, 2026	2BBHG16	N/A
29	16	"That Dog in You"	Mark Sheard	Adam Malamut & Craig Malamut	March 8, 2026	2BBHG18	N/A
30	17	"Markumentary"	Rania Tabet	Rick Sugar & Shane Kosakowski	March 15, 2026	2BBHG12	N/A
David makes a documentary about the Universal Basic Income program, showing what happened when Mark, Hank and other people lost their jobs when the factory got robots (including what caused this to happen in the first place). In the present time Mark and the others have to show what they got out of this so the program still continues.
31	18	"Crowmaster"	Martin Cormier	Shane Kosakowski	April 12, 2026	2BBHG14	N/A
Mark is at war with the crows but discovers crows give him valuable sports cards, Marks trains the crows to bring him more but also must do things for them, but it becomes clear how the crows get them and Mark is the one being trained. Darren participate in a card tournament with a gaming nemesis.

=== Season 3 (2026) ===
No. overall	No. in season	Title	Directed by	Written by	Original release date	Prod. code	U.S. viewers (millions)
32	1	"Rhoda"	Mark Sheard	Noah Prestwich	September 27, 2026	3BBHG01	0.60
Mark and Hank's mother Rhoda comes to visit them. Tammy tries to make sophisticated art but only makes simple flower paintings, so Mark switches them with paintings made by David who suffers suppressed anger. Rhoda is dismayed by Hank's lack of furniture, but Hank likes living simple.
33	2	"La Gloire Du Bouffon"	Tom Hunter	Tim Saccardo	October 4, 2026	3BBHG02	0.58
Mark is fascinated by a steam organ from the carnival and plays it well. Mark learns that it gives him the power to attract clowns and he plans to perform a clown ballet. The music makes Tammy remember her fear of clowns and she tries to find a way to get over her fear. With the help of David they go to a neighborhood clown for help. Rhoda wants Hank to perform but Hank does not care about being in a spotlight.
34	3	"Lake Piney"	Rania Tabet	Shane Kosakowski	October 18, 2026	3BBHG03	N/A
35	4	"Oedipus Flex"	Martin Cormier	Noah Prestwich	October 25, 2026	3BBHG08	TBD
Rhoda and Hank enter a mother and son dancing competition but Hank gets injured and Mark takes his place, Rhoda is met by Gloria, her nemesis and Steve's mother, who are going to enter. Mark and Rhoda is getting dance lessons from David and Andrea, Mark and Rhoda try to work together despite their not good relationship. Tammy is worried about leaving an organ donation to her social media obsessed colleague Kardgen, but Tammy learns to have fun by Kardgen during the task, but the organ gets stolen by two another social media obsessed people.
36	5	"Termination: Salvation"	Mark Sheard	Tim Saccardo	November 1, 2026	3BBHG09	TBD
37	6	"Princess Tammy"	Tom Hunter	Caroline Fox	November 8, 2026	3BBHG06	TBD
Mark takes the whole family to Storyworld, as an early birthday gift for Tammy. From Rhoda treats Tammy to a princess makeover, just so Rhoda can get turkey legs. Meanwhile Hank is trying cause an accident in the park, so he can claim a lawsuit, to pay off the massive park fees.
38	7	"Meat Cute"	Martin Cormier	Adam Malamut & Craig Malamut	November 15, 2026	3BBHG04	TBD
39	8	"Male Pattern Wellness"	TBA	TBA	November 22, 2026	TBA	TBD
40	9	"Pecking Order"	TBA	TBA	November 29, 2026	TBA	TBD

== Production ==
=== Development ===
In November 2022, it was announced that Game of Zones creators and executive producers Adam and Craig Malamut were set up on an animated series on Fox, called Universal Basic Guys/The Hoagie Bros. The series is produced by Leith Hill Productions, Fox Entertainment and Sony Pictures Television, with Bento Box Entertainment providing the animation. In May 2024, the series was retitled to Universal Basic Guys and renewed for a second season ahead of its debut in the fall. Dan Lagana serves as an executive producer and the showrunner for the first season while Rob Rosell is an executive producer and the showrunner for the second season. In May 2025, ahead of the second season premiere, the series was renewed for a third season.

=== Casting ===
On July 25, 2024, at San Diego Comic-Con, it was announced that Adam Malamut, Talia Genevieve, Fred Armisen, and Ally Maki were cast in starring roles.

== Broadcast ==
The series premiered on September 8, 2024, on Fox. The second season premiered on September 28, 2025. The third season premiered on September 27, 2026.

In Canada, the series airs on Citytv and is available to stream on Citytv+.

In the UK, the series is broadcast on ITV2, with streaming previously available on ITVX.

== Reception ==
=== Critical response ===
The review aggregator website Rotten Tomatoes reported a 29% approval rating with an average rating of 6/10, based on 7 critic reviews. Metacritic, which uses a weighted average, assigned a score of 41 out of 100 based on 5 critics, indicating "mixed or average" reviews.

=== Ratings ===
==== Season 1 ====
Viewership and ratings per episode of Universal Basic Guys
No.	Title	Air date	Timeslot (ET)	Rating/share (18–49)	Viewers (millions)	DVR (18–49)	DVR viewers (millions)	Total (18–49)	Total viewers (millions)	Ref.
1	"Pet Projects"	September 8, 2024	Sunday 8:00 p.m.	1.18/12	4.03	—N/a	—N/a	—N/a	—N/a	
2	"Sunset Cruise"	September 15, 2024	Sunday 8:00 p.m.	0.19/2	0.67	—N/a	—N/a	—N/a	—N/a	
3	"The Devil You Know"	September 22, 2024	Sunday 9:00 p.m.	0.39/3	1.33	—N/a	—N/a	—N/a	—N/a	
4	"Guy's Day"	September 29, 2024	Sunday 8:30 p.m.	0.19/2	0.71	—N/a	—N/a	—N/a	—N/a	
5	"Jaws of Life"	October 6, 2024	Sunday 8:30 p.m.	0.19/2	0.67	—N/a	—N/a	—N/a	—N/a	
6	"Bird Cage"	October 20, 2024	Sunday 8:00 p.m.	1.09/10	3.87	0.01	0.06	1.10	3.93	
7	"Fight or Flight"	October 27, 2024	Sunday 8:30 p.m.	0.19/2	0.72	0.02	0.06	0.21	0.78	
8	"Poconos"	November 3, 2024	Sunday 8:30 p.m.	0.42/4	1.40	0.02	0.06	0.44	1.46	
9	"Mr. Cupcake Man"	November 10, 2024	Sunday 8:30 p.m.	0.22/2	0.61	0.01	0.06	0.23	0.67	
10	"Mark Men"	November 24, 2024	Sunday 8:30 p.m.	0.39/4	1.44	0.01	0.04	0.40	1.48	
11	"Sheet Shock"	December 8, 2024	Sunday 8:00 p.m.	0.87	3.44	0.01	0.05	0.89	3.49	
12	"Deer Stakes"	December 15, 2024	Sunday 8:00 p.m.	0.56/5	2.29	0.01	0.06	0.57	2.34	
13	"Water Ice Shoppe"	December 29, 2024	Sunday 8:30 p.m.	0.43/5	1.49	0.01	0.05	0.44	1.53	

==== Season 2 ====
Viewership and ratings per episode of Universal Basic Guys
No.	Title	Air date	Timeslot (ET)	Rating/share (18–49)	Viewers (millions)	Ref.
1	"The Goofballs"	September 28, 2025	Sunday 8:30 p.m.	0.17/1	0.69	
2	"I Am Jar"	October 5, 2025	Sunday 8:30 p.m.	0.39/4	1.44	
3	"Golden Beans"	October 19, 2025	Sunday 8:30 p.m.	0.41/4	1.76	
4	"Down the Shore"	October 26, 2025	Sunday 8:30 p.m.	0.15/2	0.72	
5	"Well Done"	November 2, 2025	Sunday 8:30 p.m.	0.17/2	0.78	
6	"Hoagie Jones"	November 9, 2025	Sunday 8:00 p.m.	0.82/9	3.29	
7	"Medieval Knights"	November 16, 2025	Sunday 8:30 p.m.	0.16/2	0.58	
8	"Spectrum Slam"	November 23, 2025	Sunday 8:00 p.m.	1.29/14	5.08	
