= Family Guy (franchise) =

American adult animated comedy franchise

- Created by: Seth MacFarlane
- Original work: Family Guy (1999–present)
- Owner: 20th Century Studios (The Walt Disney Company)
- Years: 1999–present
- Based on: The Life of Larry (1995) and Larry & Steve (1997)

Films and television
- Animated series: Family Guy (1999–present); American Dad! (2005–present); The Cleveland Show (2009–2013); Stewie (TBA 2027/28)
- Direct-to-video: Stewie Griffin: The Untold Story (2005)

Games
- Video games: List of video games; Family Guy: Stewie 2.0 (2005); Family Guy Video Game! (2006); American Dad! vs. Family Guy 2: Hyper Turbo Combo (2006); Family Guy: Air Griffin (2007); Family Guy: Stewie's Arsenal (2007); Family Guy: Uncensored (2009); Family Guy: Time Warped (2010); Family Guy Online (2012); Family Guy: Back to the Multiverse (2012); Family Guy: The Quest for Stuff (2014); Animation Throwdown: The Quest for Cards (2016); Family Guy: Another Freakin' Mobile Game (2017); Warped Kart Racers (2022); Fortnite (2023)

Family Guy is an American animated sitcom comedy franchise created by Seth MacFarlane and originally developed for Fox. Consisting of three television series – Family Guy, The Cleveland Show, and the upcoming Stewie – the franchise primarily focuses on the Griffin family (Peter, Lois, Meg, Chris, Stewie, and Brian) and their friends and associates. The franchise also shares a fictional universe with American Dad!, another series developed by MacFarlane with a similar art style, to which it features numerous crossovers and shared characters.

In addition, the franchise had made crossovers with other properties that also aired on Fox which ended up being in canon with the same universe as Family Guy, aside from American Dad!, such as adult animated shows like The Simpsons, Futurama, King of the Hill, and Bob's Burgers, and even live-action shows like Mad TV, House, Bones, and MacFarlane's other series The Orville.

== Television series ==
=== Family Guy (1999–present) ===
Family Guy is an American animated sitcom created by Seth MacFarlane for Fox. The series centers on the Griffins, a family consisting of parents Peter and Lois; their children, Meg, Chris, and Stewie; and their anthropomorphic pet dog, Brian. The show is set in the fictional city of Quahog that is located in Rhode Island (a place that actually exists), and exhibits much of its humor in the form of metafictional cutaway gags that often lampoon American culture.

The family was conceived by MacFarlane after developing two animated films, The Life of Larry and Larry & Steve. MacFarlane redesigned the films' protagonist, Larry, and his dog, Steve, and renamed them Peter and Brian, respectively. MacFarlane pitched a seven-minute pilot to Fox in 1998, and the show was greenlit and began production. Shortly after the third season of Family Guy had aired in 2002, Fox canceled the series with one episode left unaired. Adult Swim aired that episode in 2003, finishing the series' original run. However, favorable DVD sales and high ratings for syndicated reruns on Adult Swim convinced the network to renew the show in 2004 for a fourth season, which began airing on May 1, 2005.

=== The Cleveland Show (2009–2013) ===
MacFarlane co-created—alongside Mike Henry and Richard Appel—the Family Guy spin-off The Cleveland Show, which premiered September 27, 2009. They began discussing the project in 2007. Appel and Henry served as the show's executive producers and showrunners, handling the day-to-day operations, with limited involvement from MacFarlane. Henry and Appel conceived the show as "more of a family show, a sweeter show" than Family Guy. The first season consisted of 22 episodes, and the show was picked up by Fox for a second season, which consisted of 13 episodes. The announcement was made on May 3, 2009, before the first season began. It was extended to a full second season. Appel signed a new three-year, seven-figure deal with Fox to continue serving as showrunner on The Cleveland Show in 2010. Fox chairman Gary Newman commented: "What is special about him is his incredible leadership ability." The show follows the Family Guy character Cleveland Brown, who is voiced by Henry, as he leaves the town of Quahog and moves with his son to start his own adventure.

Fox canceled The Cleveland Show on May 13, 2013, roughly a week before the May 19 conclusion of its fourth season. On July 16, 2013, MacFarlane confirmed an upcoming twelfth season episode of Family Guy centering on Cleveland's return to Quahog.

=== Stewie ===
On March 12, 2026, it was announced that Fox had ordered two seasons of a new spin-off, titled Stewie. The series will follow Stewie Griffin in preschool and exploring time and space travel. MacFarlane co-created the series alongside Kirker Butler, with both serving as executive producers alongside Kara Vallow, Butler will also serve as the showrunner. The series is set to premiere sometime in the 2027–28 television season.

=== Crossovers with other shows ===
An event known as "Night of the Hurricane" depicts a hurricane hitting the hometowns of MacFarlane's animated sitcoms Family Guy, American Dad! and The Cleveland Show, culminating in a stand-off among the three fathers of each family. The Griffin family also cameo appeared in not just both The Cleveland Show and American Dad!, but also in The Simpsons, Futurama, South Park, Robot Chicken, Drawn Together, Animals, Bordertown, Bones, Mad TV, and Mad. A two-parter South Park episode, "Cartoon Wars Parts I and II" which mocked Family Guy also features the Griffin family. A more live-action/animated episode of Bones, "The Critic in the Cabernet," crosses over with fellow Family Guy character Stewie Griffin (reprised by MacFarlane himself) as the episode's main antagonist. In 2018, Alex Borstein reprised her role as Lois Griffin in an episode of Animals.

==== The Simpsons Guy (2014) ====
In July 2013, it was announced that a special episode of Family Guy featuring an official crossover with The Simpsons would premiere in 2014. At San Diego Comic-Con a 5-minute preview was shown. The one-hour episode, titled "The Simpsons Guy" and consisting of the first and second episode of the thirteenth season of Family Guy, was aired September 28, 2014. In the episode, the Griffins are forced out of Quahog due to Peter offending women with a newspaper comic strip he created. On the road, their car gets stolen, leaving them stranded in the town of Springfield where they meet and befriend the Simpson family, only for their friendship to turn sour when Pawtucket Patriot Ale is revealed to be a rip-off of Duff. Dan Castellaneta, Julie Kavner, Nancy Cartwright, Yeardley Smith, and Hank Azaria guest star as their The Simpsons characters. The episode also includes cameo appearances by Bob Belcher from Bob's Burgers, Fred Flintstone from The Flintstones, and Roger from American Dad!.

Series	Season	Episodes	Originally released		Showrunner(s)	Status
Series	Season	Episodes	First released	Last released	Showrunner(s)	Status
Main series
Family Guy	1	7	January 31, 1999	May 16, 1999	Seth MacFarlane and David Zuckerman	Ongoing
Family Guy	2	21	September 23, 1999	August 1, 2000	Seth MacFarlane and David Zuckerman	Ongoing
Family Guy	3	22	July 11, 2001	November 9, 2003	Seth MacFarlane and David Zuckerman	Ongoing
Family Guy	4	30	May 1, 2005	May 21, 2006	David A. Goodman and Chris Sheridan	Ongoing
Family Guy	5	18	September 10, 2006	May 20, 2007	David A. Goodman and Chris Sheridan	Ongoing
Family Guy	6	12	September 23, 2007	May 4, 2008	David A. Goodman and Chris Sheridan	Ongoing
Family Guy	7	16	September 28, 2008	May 17, 2009	David A. Goodman and Chris Sheridan	Ongoing
Family Guy	8	21	September 27, 2009	June 20, 2010	Mark Hentemann and Steve Callaghan	Ongoing
Family Guy	9	18	September 26, 2010	May 22, 2011	Mark Hentemann and Steve Callaghan	Ongoing
Family Guy	10	23	September 25, 2011	May 20, 2012	Mark Hentemann and Steve Callaghan	Ongoing
Family Guy	11	22	September 30, 2012	May 19, 2013	Steve Callaghan and Richard Appel	Ongoing
Family Guy	12	21	September 29, 2013	May 18, 2014	Steve Callaghan and Richard Appel	Ongoing
Family Guy	13	18	September 28, 2014	May 17, 2015	Steve Callaghan and Richard Appel	Ongoing
Family Guy	14	20	September 27, 2015	May 22, 2016	Steve Callaghan and Richard Appel	Ongoing
Family Guy	15	20	September 25, 2016	May 21, 2017	Steve Callaghan and Richard Appel	Ongoing
Family Guy	16	20	October 1, 2017	May 20, 2018	Richard Appel and Alec Sulkin	Ongoing
Family Guy	17	20	September 30, 2018	May 12, 2019	Richard Appel and Alec Sulkin	Ongoing
Family Guy	18	20	September 29, 2019	May 17, 2020	Richard Appel and Alec Sulkin	Ongoing
Family Guy	19	20	September 27, 2020	May 16, 2021	Richard Appel and Alec Sulkin	Ongoing
Family Guy	20	20	September 26, 2021	May 22, 2022	Richard Appel and Alec Sulkin	Ongoing
Family Guy	21	20	September 25, 2022	May 7, 2023	Richard Appel and Alec Sulkin	Ongoing
Family Guy	22	15	October 1, 2023	April 17, 2024	Richard Appel and Alec Sulkin	Ongoing
Family Guy	23	18	October 14, 2024	July 17, 2025	Richard Appel and Alec Sulkin	Ongoing
Family Guy	24	TBA	October 6, 2025	May 17, 2026	Richard Appel and Alec Sulkin	Ongoing
Spin-off
The Cleveland Show	1	21	September 27, 2009	May 23, 2010	Richard Appel and Mike Henry	Completed
The Cleveland Show	2	22	September 26, 2010	May 15, 2011	Richard Appel and Mike Henry	Completed
The Cleveland Show	3	22	September 25, 2011	May 20, 2012	Richard Appel and Mike Henry	Completed
The Cleveland Show	4	23	October 7, 2012	May 19, 2013	Richard Appel and Mike Henry	Completed

== Merchandise ==
As of 2009, six books have been released about the Family Guy universe, all published by HarperCollins since 2005. The first, Family Guy: Stewie's Guide to World Domination (ISBN 978-0-06-077321-2) by Steve Callahan, was released on April 26, 2005. Written in the style of a graphic novel, the plot follows Stewie's plans to rule the world. Other books include Family Guy: It Takes a Village Idiot, and I Married One (ISBN 978-0-7528-7593-4), which covers the events of the episode "It Takes a Village Idiot, and I Married One"; and Family Guy and Philosophy: A Cure for the Petarded (ISBN 978-1-4051-6316-3), a collection of 17 essays exploring the connections between the series and historical philosophers. A book written from Brian's point of view (written by Andrew Goldberg) was published in 2006, called Brian Griffin's Guide to Booze, Broads and the Lost Art of Being a Man.

Family Guy has been commercially successful in the home market. The show was the first to be resurrected because of high DVD sales. The first volume, covering the show's first two seasons, sold 1.67 million units, topping TV DVD sales in 2003, while the second volume sold another million units. Volumes six and seven debuted at fifth place in United States DVD sales; volume seven was the highest-selling television DVD, selling 171,000 units by June 21, 2009. Family Guy Presents Blue Harvest, the DVD featuring the Star Wars special "Blue Harvest", was released on January 15, 2008, and premiered at the top of United States DVD sales. The DVD was the first Family Guy DVD to include a digital copy for download to the iPod. In 2004, the first series of Family Guy toy figurines was released by Mezco Toyz; each member of the Griffin family had their own toy, with the exception of Stewie, of whom two different figures were made. Over the course of two years, four more series of toy figures were released, with various forms of Peter. In 2008, the character Peter appeared in advertisements for Subway Restaurants, promoting the restaurant's massive feast sandwich.

== Other media ==
=== Books ===
Family Guy: It Takes a Village Idiot, and I Married One was written by executive story editor Cherry Chevapravatdumrong and actress Alex Borstein. The book was first published on May 8, 2007. The book is a biographical monologue by Lois Griffin discussing her memories of growing up and to her attempted run for mayor in the town of Quahog. Though the book primarily consists of a loose narrative monologue by Lois, it is also interspersed with sections from other characters such as Peter Griffin. The book covers events featured in the Family Guy episode "It Takes a Village Idiot, and I Married One", with which it shares a title. It was published in the United Kingdom in 2007 by Orion Books.

A comic book based on the Family Guy universe was produced. Published by Titan Comics, edited by Steve White and illustrated by Anthony Williams and S. L. Gallant. The writing and the illustrations will be supervised by the show's producers. The first comic book was released on July 27, 2011.

Inside Family Guy: An Illustrated History was released in May 2019, as part of the series' 20th anniversary.

=== Live performances ===
As promotion for the show, and, as Newman described, "[to] expand interest in the show beyond its diehard fans", Fox organized four Family Guy Live! performances, which featured cast members reading old episodes aloud. The cast also performed musical numbers from the Family Guy: Live in Vegas comedy album. The stage shows were an extension of a performance by the cast during the 2004 Montreal Comedy Festival. The Family Guy Live! performances, which took place in Los Angeles and New York, sold out and were attended by around 1,200 people each.

In 2007, at the 59th Annual Primetime Emmy Awards, MacFarlane performed (as the digitally inserted Stewie and Brian) the ceremony's opening number. He performed a song insulting modern (at the time) television to the tune of the song "The Fellas At The Freakin' F.C.C." performed in the episode "PTV". The song insulted TV shows such as Two and a Half Men, Desperate Housewives, and Scrubs, as well as the final scene of The Sopranos.

In 2009, a special televised performance show aired entitled Family Guy Presents Seth & Alex's Almost Live Comedy Show, in which voice actors Alex Borstein and MacFarlane performed songs from the show, as well as a parody of Lady Gaga's song "Poker Face" in the voice of Marlee Matlin, who appeared on stage as a guest during the performance. Some new animated gags also appeared in the show.

=== Films ===
==== Untitled Family Guy film ====
On July 22, 2007, in an interview with The Hollywood Reporter, MacFarlane announced that he may start working on a theatrical feature film, although "nothing's official." In TV Week on July 18, 2008, MacFarlane confirmed plans to produce a theatrically released Family Guy feature film sometime "within the next year." He came up with an idea for the story, "something that you could not do on the show, which [to him] is the only reason to do a movie." He later went to say he imagines the film to be "an old-style musical with dialogue" similar to The Sound of Music, saying that he would "really be trying to capture, musically, that feel." On October 13, 2011, MacFarlane confirmed that a deal for a Family Guy film had been made, and that it would be written by himself and series co-producer Ricky Blitt.

On November 30, 2012, MacFarlane confirmed plans to produce a Family Guy film. The project was put on hold while MacFarlane worked on Ted 2.

On August 10, 2018, Fox announced that a live-action/animated film based on the series was in development.

In July 2019, MacFarlane confirmed that there would be a Family Guy feature film adaptation.

As of April 2024, Seth MacFarlane shared his plans to do a movie at PaleyFest but hasn't gotten the time to do it.

=== Video games ===
The Family Guy Video Game! is a 2006 action game released by 2K Games and developed by High Voltage Software. The game received mixed reviews, averaging 50% favorable reviews for the PlayStation 2 version, 51% for the PlayStation Portable version, and 53% for the Xbox version, according to review aggregator Metacritic. The game received praise for its humor, but was criticized for its short playtime and "uninteresting gameplay".

To promote both Family Guy and American Dad!'s home media releases, 20th Century Fox Home Entertainment officially released an animated crossover fighting game, American Dad! vs. Family Guy 2: Hyper Turbo Combo, on its official website in 2006. It also features Street Fighter's own Ryu as a surprise playable character. Two other Family Guy mobile games (Air Griffin and Uncensored) were released on 2007 and 2009, respectively. MacFarlane recorded exclusive material of Peter's voice and other Family Guy characters for a 2007 pinball machine of the show by Stern Pinball. On November 2, 2009, IGN journalist Ryan Langley reported the production of a Family Guy-based party game for the Xbox 360, PlayStation 3, and Wii. He cited the LinkedIn profiles of former HB Studios developer Chris Kolmatycki and Invisible Entertainment co-owner Ron Doucet, which stated that the individuals had worked on the game.

A game called Family Guy Online was launched into public beta in April 2012, but permanently shut down on January 18, 2013. Family Guy: Back to the Multiverse, which is centered around the episode "Road to the Multiverse", was released on November 20, 2012. Family Guy: The Quest for Stuff launched on iOS and Android on April 10, 2014. Animation Throwdown: The Quest for Cards was launched on 2016 for iOS, Android and Steam on September 27, 2016. It is a crossover card fighting/strategy game featuring Family Guy, American Dad!, King of the Hill, Futurama and Bob's Burgers. Family Guy: Another Freakin Mobile Game was released on iOS on April 25, 2017. Warped Kart Racers was released on Apple Arcade in May 2022. It is a crossover racing game between Family Guy, American Dad!, King of the Hill and Solar Opposites.
