= Family Guy Online =

2012 video game

- Developers: Roadhouse Interactive; A.C.R.O.N.Y.M. Games
- Publisher: 20th Century Fox
- Engine: Unity
- Release: April 17, 2012
- Genre: MMORPG
- Mode: Multiplayer

Family Guy Online was a massively multiplayer online role-playing game (MMORPG) based on the animated television series Family Guy. Developed in partnership between Canadian studios Roadhouse Interactive, A.C.R.O.N.Y.M. Games and 20th Century Fox, Family Guy Online was a free-to-play game that used the Unity game engine. The game originally launched into public beta on April 17, 2012. On December 21, 2012 the developers announced that the game would not be developed beyond beta status and service was permanently terminated on January 18, 2013.

== Gameplay ==
The player character receives a quest from Stewie Griffin, a character from the television series Family Guy that acts as a non-playable quest giver in the game.

Family Guy Online used cel shaded graphics. The game used typical MMORPG character classes such as having Stewie act as a ranger, Peter as a tank, and Lois as a healer. Players would create their own character using the Griffin family as a template. The actual characters from the show are reserved as non-playable characters (NPCs) in the game in order to give the player quests and advance the storyline (pictured). The NPCs in the game were voiced by the same voice actors in the show.

The game used two types of in-game currency: cash and clams. Clams were earned by completing in-game objectives.

== Development ==
Family Guy Online was first revealed by 20th Century Fox through social media and through its official website on June 16, 2011, with initial plans to launch the game in autumn 2011. People wishing to join the beta phase for the game were invited to register on the website, although registration did not guarantee entrance into the beta. The game would use the Unity game engine to run within a user's web browser. IGN's Nick Kolan said that the game's use of cel shaded graphics showed potential for the game, but worried that it "could also be a total no-effort cash-cow."

Rather than licensing the rights to create a game based on the television series, Family Guy Online was developed directly by 20th Century Fox, in partnership with Roadhouse Interactive and Sleepy Giant Entertainment. The publisher of the game wanted it to appeal to both casual and hardcore gamers, and to this end chose to make the game using the Unity engine instead of developing it as a game for Facebook.

The game was launched in 2012 and entered a public beta phase on April 17, 2012; however, it never moved out of beta. On December 21, 2012, an announcement posted on the Family Guy Online website stated that the game would be permanently closed on January 18, 2013. Real-money purchases that players had made within the 60 days prior to the announcement would be refunded to them.
