= Warped Kart Racers =

2022 racing video game

- Developer: Electric Square
- Publisher: Electric Square
- Platforms: iOS, macOS, tvOS
- Release: May 20, 2022
- Genre: Kart racing

Warped Kart Racers is a kart racing video game developed and published by Electric Square under license from 20th Century Games. It features properties from four different animated television shows by 20th Television Animation, including: Family Guy, American Dad!, King of the Hill and Solar Opposites. It was released exclusively through Apple Arcade on May 20, 2022.

== Gameplay ==
Warped Kart Racers consists of kart racing gameplay similar to Mario Kart and Crash Team Racing. The game features 16 tracks and 20 playable characters from several 20th Television Animation series. The game includes an eight-player online multiplayer mode, as well as a single-player campaign with daily challenges. By completing these challenges, players can unlock new characters, skins, karts, and customizations.

== Development ==
Warped Kart Racers was announced by Apple on May 3, 2022, with animated characters licensed from four different animated shows by 20th Television Animation. It was released as an exclusive through Apple Arcade on May 20, 2022.

== Reception ==
Kotaku's Zack Zwiezen noted that although the game was a clear Mario Kart clone, it was also a "fun and well-made mobile kart racer" and that the lack of microtransactions that are present in most mobile games because of the Apple Arcade subscription model compared favorably against Mario Kart Tour. Pocket Tactics's Kayleigh Partleton praised the game and called it a "fantastic mobile kart racer" in a positive review.

In 2023, Warped Kart Racers was the 6th most-downloaded game on Apple Arcade.

== See also ==
- Animation Domination
- Animation Throwdown: The Quest for Cards
- List of vehicular combat games
