= 20th Television Animation =

American television animation production and distribution company

- Logo used since 2021
- Formerly: Fox Television Animation (1999–2020)
- Type: Division
- Industry: Animation; Television production
- Founded: May 19, 1999; 27 years ago
- Headquarters: Walt Disney Studios, Burbank, California, U.S.
- Key people: Marci Proietto (president); Chris Cikowski (vice president)
- Products: Animated television series Direct-to-video films Specials
- Parent: 20th Century Fox Television (1999–2019); Disney Television Studios (2019–present)

20th Television Animation (formerly known as Fox Television Animation) is an American animation studio and production company that creates, develops, produces, publishes, and distributes primarily adult animated television series and specials. Established on May 19, 1999, it is a unit of Disney Television Studios, a subsidiary of Disney Entertainment, which is a division of the Walt Disney Company.

== History ==
=== 1999–2019: As a unit of 20th Century Fox Television / 20th Television ===
The studio was established on May 19, 1999. Its first project was the continued production of Family Guy for its second season, which it took over from the series' previous home at Film Roman for season one, following "production differences". The studio would become the home of future animated series co-created by Seth MacFarlane: American Dad! and The Cleveland Show. In 2016, Fox Television Animation assumed production of Matt Groening's The Simpsons, once again taking over from Film Roman.

Most animated projects from 20th Television Animation are subcontracted to third party animation production companies such as Film Roman, Titmouse, Inc., Bento Box Entertainment, and Rough Draft Studios, but the company maintains 20th Television Animation as an in-house option. Because the company acts as a production house for hire, it is not treated as a labeled division of 20th Century Studios like Searchlight Pictures. The studio specializes in animation pre-production and post-production, while the actual animation production is handled by studios in South Korea. 20th Television Animation's frequent contractors include Digital eMation, Yearim, AKOM, and Rough Draft Korea.

The studio maintains a location in the Miracle Mile neighborhood of Los Angeles, California. Its workers are represented by The Animation Guild, IATSE Local 839.

=== 2019–present: Under Disney Television Studios ===
In March 2019, 20th Century Fox Television, 20th Television, and Fox Television Animation were acquired by the Walt Disney Company and integrated into Walt Disney Television as part of Disney Television Studios. In September 2020, the company was renamed as 20th Television Animation starting with newer episodes of shows in production at the company.

In December 2020, it was announced that 20th Television Animation would be relaunched as a standalone unit from 20th Television. In March 2021, Marci Proietto was tentatively named as president of the company. 20th Television Animation focuses on producing and developing animated projects targeted at teens and adults, as opposed to their children-targeted sister studio Disney Television Animation. Under the new incarnation, 20th Television Animation would assume executive supervision of the production of all animated projects that had, up to that point, been overseen by 20th Television. This allowed series that 20th Television Animation was already producing animation for under 20th Television's watch to be brought entirely under one company, while series whose animation was produced by a third-party company would retain that relationship, with 20th Television Animation only absorbing the above-the-line production and acting as the new client for the animation contractor.

On March 16, 2022, it was announced that the studio would collaborate with sister studio Disney Television Animation, for the creation of family-friendly and young adult animated series, miniseries and films for Disney+ with the first project under this collaboration being the animated series Rhona Who Lives by the River.

In April 2025, Disney announced that it would not renew its lease with Fox Corporation and that it leave the Fox Studio Lot business in Century City at the end of 2025. As a result, 20th Television Animation relocated to Walt Disney Studios in Burbank.

== Filmography ==
=== Television series ===
Title	Creator(s)	Developer(s)	Year(s)	Network	Co-production with	Notes
The Simpsons	Matt Groening	James L. Brooks; Matt Groening; Sam Simon	1989–present	Fox	Gracie Films	Animation production for seasons 28–32 and production company since season 33
King of the Hill	Mike Judge; Greg Daniels	Mike Judge; Greg Daniels; Saladin K. Patterson	1997–present	Fox (seasons 1–13); Hulu (season 14–) (Note: Airs on Disney+ internationally.)	Deedle-Dee Productions; Judgmental Films; Bandera Entertainment (season 14–); 3 Arts Entertainment	Production company since season 14, also replaced Film Roman for animation production
Family Guy	Seth MacFarlane	Seth MacFarlane; David Zuckerman	1999–present	Fox	Fuzzy Door Productions	Animation production for seasons 2–19 and production company since season 20; two episodes premiered respectively on Adult Swim and BBC Three
Futurama	Matt Groening	Matt Groening; David X. Cohen	1999–present	Fox (seasons 1–4); Comedy Central (seasons 5–7); Hulu (season 8–)	The Curiosity Company	Production company since season 8, credited as "30th Television Animation"
American Dad!	Seth MacFarlane; Mike Barker; Matt Weitzman		2005–present	Fox (seasons 1–11; 22–); TBS (seasons 12–21)	Fuzzy Door Productions; Underdog Productions	Animation production for seasons 1–18 and production company since season 19
The Cleveland Show	Seth MacFarlane; Richard Appel; Mike Henry		2009–2013	Fox	Fuzzy Door Productions; Person Unknown Productions; Happy Jack Productions	Animation production only, credited as Fox Television Animation throughout its run
Bob's Burgers	Loren Bouchard	Loren Bouchard; Jim Dauterive	2011–present	Fox	Wilo Productions (season 2–); Buck & Millie Productions (seasons 2–10)	Production company since season 12
Duncanville	Amy Poehler; Mike Scully; Julie Thacker Scully		2020–2022	Fox	Paper Kite Productions; Scullys; 3 Arts Entertainment (uncredited); Universal Television; Fox Entertainment	Production company for season 3, last six episodes produced for season 3 released on Hulu on October 18
Solar Opposites	Justin Roiland; Mike McMahan		2020–2025	Hulu	Justin Roiland's Solo Vanity Card Productions! (seasons 1–3); Important Science	Production company for seasons 3–6
Central Park	Loren Bouchard; Josh Gad; Nora Smith		2020–2022	Apple TV+	Wilo Productions; Angry Child Productions; Brillstein Entertainment Partners	Production company for season 3
The Great North	Lizzie Molyneux-Logelin & Wendy Molyneux; Minty Lewis		2021–2025	Fox	Double Molyneux Sister Sheux; Wilo Productions; Fox Entertainment	Production company for seasons 2–5
Hit-Monkey	Will Speck; Josh Gordon		2021–2024	Hulu	Speck Gordon Inc. Floyd County Productions	Production company for season 2, replacing Marvel Television, copyright credits for season 2 continues to be held by Marvel Television
Koala Man	Michael Cusack	Michael Cusack; Dan Hernandez; Benji Samit	2023	Hulu	Cusack Creatures; Hermit House; Justin Roiland's Solo Vanity Card Productions! Princess Pictures; Bento Box Entertainment	First production not inherited from 20th Television
Praise Petey	Anna Drezen		2023	Freeform	ShadowMachine; Gorgeous Horse Productions; The Monica Padrick Company; Bandera Entertainment	
Stewie	Seth MacFarlane; Kirker Butler		2027 or 2028	Fox	Fuzzy Door Productions	
Rhona Who Lives by the River	Emily Kapnek		TBA	Disney+	Piece of Pie Productions; Stoopid Buddy Stoodios; Disney Television Animation	
Standing By	Dan Levy		TBA	Hulu	Not a Real Production Company; Straight on Til Morning Productions; Bento Box Entertainment	
How To Be Black	Laurence Fishburne		TBA	ABC	Cinema Gypsy Productions; ABC Signature	based on the book of the same name
Deano	Dean Thomas; David Ferrier; Joe Brumm		TBA	Hulu (Note: Airs on Disney+ internationally, will also air on BBC One and BBC iPlayer in the UK.)	Hooligan Animation; BBC Studios	
Firefly	Joss Whedon	Tara Butters; Marc Guggenheim	TBA		ShadowMachine; Collision33	

=== Specials ===
Title	Release date	Network	Co-production with
The Paloni Show! Halloween Special!	October 17, 2022	Hulu	Justin Roiland's Solo Vanity Card Productions!

=== Short films ===
==== Theatrical ====
Title	Release date	Director(s)	Release with	Notes
Inside the CIA	April 8, 2005	Seth MacFarlane	Fever Pitch (theatrical); American Dad! Volume 1 (DVD)	Originally released theatrically to promote the series which was new at the time. Included in the special features of the American Dad! Volume 1 DVD.
A Terrifying Message From Al Gore	May 26, 2006	Peter Avanzino	An Inconvenient Truth (theatrical); Futurama: Bender's Big Score (DVD)	Originally a short film to promote An Inconvenient Truth. Included as a special feature of the Futurama: Bender's Big Score DVD.
The Longest Daycare	July 13, 2012	David Silverman	Ice Age: Continental Drift	The film was nominated for an Academy Award for Best Animated Short Film in 2013.
Playdate with Destiny	March 6, 2020	David Silverman	Onward	It was released to Disney+ on April 10, 2020, a month after the film's premiere due to the COVID-19 pandemic.
My Butt Has a Fever	May 6, 2022	Loren Bouchard & Bernard Derriman	Doctor Strange in the Multiverse of Madness (Note: The short premiered exclusively at Alamo Drafthouse screenings only.)	The short was planned for a theatrical release in 2020 in front of an undetermined Disney film, but was put on hold due to the COVID-19 pandemic closing down movie theaters.

==== Direct-to-video ====
Title	Release date	Director(s)	Release with	Notes
Amazon Adventure	November 27, 2007	Dwayne Carey-Hill	Futurama: Bender's Big Score	A full 22-minute episode of Everybody Loves Hypnotoad that was included as a special feature of the Futurama: Bender's Big Score DVD.

==== Streaming ====
Title	Release date	Network	Co-production with	Notes
The Force Awakens from Its Nap	May 4, 2021	Disney+	20th Television; Gracie Films	Animation service only; The Simpsons's first homage to Star Wars
The Good, the Bart, and the Loki	July 7, 2021	Disney+	20th Television; Gracie Films	Animation service only; The Simpsons's homage to the Marvel Cinematic Universe
Plusaversary	November 12, 2021	Disney+	Gracie Films	The Simpsons's celebration of Disney+ Day
When Billie Met Lisa	April 22, 2022	Disney+	Gracie Films	The Simpsons's homage to Happier Than Ever: A Love Letter to Los Angeles
Welcome to the Club	September 8, 2022	Disney+	Gracie Films	The Simpsons's first homage to Disney Villains
The Simpsons Meet the Bocellis in "Feliz Navidad"	December 15, 2022	Disney+	Gracie Films	
Rogue Not Quite One	May 4, 2023	Disney+	Gracie Films	The Simpsons's second homage to Star Wars
May the 12th Be with You	May 10, 2024	Disney+	Gracie Films	The Simpsons's third homage to Star Wars
The Most Wonderful Time of the Year	October 11, 2024	Disney+	Gracie Films	The Simpsons's second homage to Disney Villains

==== Miscellaneous ====
Title	Release date	Network	Co-production with	Notes
The Simpsons | Balenciaga	October 2, 2021	YouTube	Gracie Films	The Simpsons's collaboration with luxury fashion house Balenciaga
Te Deseo Lo Mejor	December 24, 2021	YouTube	Gracie Films	The Simpsons's collaboration with Puerto Rican rapper and singer Bad Bunny

=== Theatrical films ===
Title	Release date	Director(s)	Writer(s)	Producer(s)	Composer(s)	Co-production with	Distributor	Budget	Gross
The Simpsons Movie	July 27, 2007	David Silverman	James L. Brooks; Matt Groening; Al Jean; Ian Maxtone-Graham; George Meyer; David Mirkin; Mike Reiss; Mike Scully; Matt Selman; John Swartzwelder; Jon Vitti	James L. Brooks; Matt Groening; Al Jean; Mike Scully; Richard Sakai	Hans Zimmer	20th Century Fox Animation; Gracie Films	20th Century Fox	$75 million	$536.4 million
The Bob's Burgers Movie	May 27, 2022	Loren Bouchard; Bernard Derriman	Loren Bouchard; Nora Smith	Janelle Momary-Neely; Loren Bouchard; Nora Smith	John Dylan Keith; Loren Bouchard	20th Century Animation; Wilo Productions	20th Century Studios (Note: under Walt Disney Studios Motion Pictures)	$38 million	$34.2 million
The New Simpsons Movie	September 3, 2027	TBA	TBA	TBA	TBA	20th Century Animation; Gracie Films	20th Century Studios	—N/a	—N/a

== See also ==
- Adult animation
- 20th Television
  - List of 20th Television programs
- Disney Television Animation
- 20th Century Animation
- FX Productions
- Disney General Entertainment Content
