= Stewie (TV series) =

Animated TV show

- Genre: Animated sitcom
- Created by: Seth MacFarlane; Kirker Butler
- Based on: Family Guy by Seth MacFarlane
- Showrunner: Kirker Butler
- Voices of: Seth MacFarlane; Kenan Thompson; Vanessa Bayer; Mike Henry; Melissa O'Neil; Aaron Lee; Jessica Lowe
- Composer: Walter Murphy
- Country of origin: United States
- Original language: English

Production
- Executive producers: Seth MacFarlane; Kirker Butler; Kara Vallow
- Production companies: Fuzzy Door Productions; 20th Television Animation

Original release
- Network: Fox

Related
- Family Guy; The Cleveland Show

Stewie is an upcoming American animated sitcom created by Seth MacFarlane and Kirker Butler for Fox. It serves as the second spin-off of Family Guy following The Cleveland Show, as well as the third television series of the franchise. The series centers around Stewie Griffin and a new set of characters within the title character's class.

In March 2026, Fox announced a two-season pick-up order of a second spin-off of Family Guy, with MacFarlane reprising his role as Stewie while also serving as executive producer. In July 2026, Mike Henry, who previously voiced Cleveland Brown in Family Guy and The Cleveland Show, was confirmed as part of the cast alongside Kenan Thompson, Vanessa Bayer, Melissa O'Neil, Aaron Lee, and Jessica Lowe. The series is set to premiere during the 2027–28 season.

== Premise ==
After being expelled from his old preschool, Stewie is enrolled in a new school with a set of new classmates he does not know. Stewie uses his time-travel device to take his classmates on a variety of adventures.

== Voice cast and characters ==
=== Main ===
- Seth MacFarlane as Stewie Griffin, the Griffin Family's infant child and genius prodigy
- Kenan Thompson as Royal, one of Stewie's new friends at preschool
- Vanessa Bayer as Morgan, Stewie's teacher
- Mike Henry as BJ, Stewie's classmate and the son of Bruce from Family Guy
- Melissa O'Neil as Wanda, Stewie's classmate
- Aaron Lee as Skunk, the one hundred-year-old class turtle
- Jessica Lowe as Caroline, Stewie's "classroom nemesis"

== Development ==
In March 2026, Fox announced a two-season pick-up order of the series, with creator Seth MacFarlane reprising his role as Stewie while also serving as an executive producer alongside Kara Vallow. Long time series writer Kirker Butler is set to serve as executive producer and showrunner for the series.

In July 2026, Mike Henry, who previously voiced Cleveland Brown in Family Guy and The Cleveland Show, was confirmed as part of the cast alongside Kenan Thompson, Vanessa Bayer, Melissa O'Neil, Aaron Lee, and Jessica Lowe.

== Release ==
The series is set to premiere in the 2027–28 season on Fox, and be available for streaming the next day on Hulu. The first season will run for 15 episodes or fewer.
