= Animation Throwdown: The Quest for Cards =

2016 video game

- Developer: Kongregate
- Publisher: Kongregate
- Platforms: Android, iOS, Microsoft Windows, Browser
- Release: NA: September 27, 2016
- Genre: Digital collectible card game
- Modes: Single-player, multiplayer

Animation Throwdown: The Quest for Cards is a free-to-play digital collectible card game that combines content and characters from the American adult animated television sitcoms by 20th Television Animation, including: Family Guy, Futurama, American Dad!, Bob's Burgers, King of the Hill, and Archer. The game is available for Android, iOS, Steam, Kartridge and on the web via Kongregate.

== Gameplay ==
Sample of battle between Adventure mode hero Enos Fry (from the Futurama episode "Roswell That Ends Well") and player hero Tina (Bob's Burgers)

Play is divided between maintenance activities (acquiring cards, upgrading them, and assembling card decks from the player's collection) and playing battles against the game AI; there is no direct player interaction with opponents or direct assistance of teammates. New players begin the game with a low-level starter hero, choosing one of Bob Belcher, Roger, Brian Griffin, Turanga Leela, Bobby Hill and Sterling Archer, and are provided with a collection of starter cards. Gameplay primarily focuses on earning resources to improve cards and obtain better cards, and to level up heroes and gain access to more powerful heroes; monetization primarily revolves around speeding up access to these improvements and providing access to premium content cards and heroes. Like MMORPGs there is no "win" condition; players who have completed all episodic content generally continue to upgrade their decks to remain competitive with each other. Turn-based gameplay consists of playing cards drawn from a virtual deck into the player's hand onto a tableau to fight against an AI playing cards from its own deck; depending on game mode the AI's deck may be system-generated or may belong to another player. Cards attack the card directly across from them and, if unopposed, attack the opponent's "hero" tower; the battle is won when the opponent's hero is defeated. A main tactic of card play is to play a character card and object card into the same slot to fuse into a more powerful combination ("combo") that the player has previously learned. Cards are primarily images taken from one show, though some of the lowest-level cards are generic, such as "Alcohol", "Baseball", and "Music". Cards are played against a backdrop of a building or place from one of the shows.

== Development ==
Kongregate approached Fox in order to create a card game compilation of their franchises that was "broadly acceptable and deep." As part of this, they also had Synapse Games and Chinzilla, who had made card games for Kongregate, and created a pitch that had elements from their games. The development team worked with the writers and producers to craft content for this game, with animated characters licensed from six different animated shows by 20th Television Animation.

== Reception ==
The game was received very well when it was first published, picked as an Editor's Choice on Google Play, and reaching number 1 in the RPG and Adventure categories (and number 3 game overall) on the App Store, but has gotten relatively little publicity since 2016.

== See also ==
- Animation Domination
- Warped Kart Racers
