= Family Guy Video Game! =

2006 video game

- North American cover art
- Developer: High Voltage Software
- Publisher: 2K
- Producer: Kevin Sheller
- Designer: Kyle Miller
- Programmer: John Sanderson
- Artist: Cary Penczek
- Writers: Steve Callaghan; Kirker Butler; Patrick Meighan
- Composer: Associated Production Music
- Platforms: PlayStation 2; PlayStation Portable; Xbox
- Release: PlayStation 2, Xbox: NA: October 17, 2006; EU: October 26, 2006; AU: November 3, 2006; PlayStation Portable: NA: October 17, 2006; AU: November 3, 2006; EU: December 1, 2006
- Genres: Action-adventure, platform
- Mode: Single-player

Family Guy Video Game! is a 2006 action-adventure video game developed by High Voltage Software and published by 2K. Based on the Fox animated television series of the same name, it was released for the PlayStation 2, Xbox, and PlayStation Portable. A follow-up game, Family Guy: Back to the Multiverse, was released in 2012.

== Gameplay ==
Stewie using his mind control on Death in the "Hospital Madness Part Deux" level.

The game is split into 22 levels for the three playable characters: Peter, Stewie or Brian. Peter and Stewie have eight levels, while Brian has six. Each character has his own unique style of play.

Some other characters can also be controlled by the player during small fractions of Stewie's levels, as he possesses a Mind Controller Device. These include Lois, Quagmire, Cleveland, Death and Meg, as well as other minor characters and unknown characters.

Peter's levels have a beat 'em up style. In Peter's levels, the player rampages across a section of town, attacking anyone and anything in his path. In addition, depending on the player's progression through the game, Peter will adopt a different persona as a result of head trauma, giving his attacks different animations but otherwise similar results. Peter's alter egos are Rufus Griffin, Hooker Peter and A.N.N.A. (Automaton Nuclear Neo-human Android), played in that order. Peter begins and ends the game as himself.

Stewie's levels resemble a platformer conventional to most licensed games. Stewie uses his upgradeable laser gun to defeat enemies and conveniently placed "sky hooks" to move through various stages. He also uses his Mind Controller Device to briefly control other characters and use their abilities, most notably Death, Quagmire and Lois.

Brian's levels have more in common with stealth games. Brian must avoid detection by those around him, and can adopt disguises to fool onlookers. A secondary element in Brian's levels is avoiding his natural urge to urinate on things. Should the player remain near certain objects for too long (potted plants, fire hydrants, etc.), Brian will be forced to pee on them, exposing himself to those around him.

Out of the Mind-Controllable characters, Lois has the ability to interact with household items such as the Oven and the Vacuum Cleaner, and she is also the only character that can open the doors inside the family's house. Quagmire and Meg work as Repellents for female and male NPC's, respectively, and can force them to do certain things through their repulsiveness. Death can kill other NPC's and is immune to their attacks. The other characters have no special abilities.

Chris is the only character of the main cast of the show that is not playable in any way through the entire game (not even through Stewie's mind control), although he appears as a NPC.

A key feature of the game are mini-games done in the same style as the cutaway gags that the show is famous for, usually lasting less than 10 seconds. The mini-games often repeat cutaway gags from the episodes, such as Peter inexplicably burning his hand in a waffle iron. Successfully completing the mini-game offers a bonus: Brian becomes invisible for a short period, while Peter and Stewie receive power-ups for their respective abilities. Lois and Meg are not benefited by any mini-game.

== Plot ==
Stewie has built a mind control ray, and plans to use it in conjunction with Peter's satellite dish. However, his plans are interrupted by his half-brother Bertram, who claims to want his satellite dish. After making his way to the roof, Stewie decides that he would rather fail at world domination than let the satellite fall into his half-brother's hands, and self-destructs the satellite dish. However, Bertram reveals that he has come to trick him into destroying his own satellite, and he has begun a plan for world domination as well. He then leaves in his helicopter, and blasts Stewie off the roof. To discover Bertram's plans, Stewie infiltrates his lair in Peter's testicles. There, Stewie finds the location of Bertram's new lair and promptly lays waste to the facility. Stewie finds Bertram at the top of a missile silo, planning to launch the rocket into orbit so he can project his mind control beam around the world. To add insult to injury, Stewie's teddy bear, Rupert, has been placed inside the rocket. Stewie destroys the rocket, rescues Rupert, and has a final battle with Bertram at the playground. Bertram uses a device to grow to tremendous size, but is defeated anyway. Before Stewie can finish him off, he calls for his "mommy" to escape, leaving Stewie by flipping him off.

Brian's section of the game sees him trying to prove his innocence when Carter Pewterschmidt accuses him of once again impregnating his prize-winning racing greyhound Seabreeze. Brian is forced to escape from prison and follow a scent picked up from Seabreeze's genitals. This leads him to Tom Tucker at the Quahog News Station, which turns out to be a dead end. Brian's next stop is the Quahog Dog Races, where Brian, disguised as a food vendor, finds the scent on a discarded ticket stub. He takes Seabreeze's place in the race, wins (by drugging the other dogs), and draws the father out. Brian reveals that the father of Seabreeze's puppies is Glenn Quagmire, thereby clearing his name.

Peter, after being smashed on the head by the PTV satellite dish, wakes up in the hospital and sees a spotlight identical to the Bat-Signal, only in the shape of Mr. Belvedere. Believing that Belvedere has kidnapped his family, Peter rampages across town in an effort to destroy him and save his family. He eventually arrives at Cheesie Charlie's, where he is hit in the head by the doors, opened by several African-Americans. Peter takes on the persona of his cousin and blaxploitation film actor Rufus Griffin and destroys the entire arcade before waking up in the closet. Seeing that the Belvedere signal is now at the Indian Casino, Peter travels there. As he enters, he takes another blow to the head when a hooker attempts suicide by jumping off the roof. Peter becomes Hooker Peter and destroys the casino. He then takes a fourth blow to the head, now seeing the Belvedere signal again at the docks. As he arrives, the debris of Bertram's rocket crashes on him, and Peter emerges as ANNA, an android programmed to destroy Mr. Belvedere. Crossing the dock and the beach, Peter arrives at a cave and is forced into battle with the Black Knight. Peter defeats the knight, but takes a final blow to the head when the knight's helmet falls off and hits him. When he comes to, Lois confronts him, furious that Peter had destroyed half of Quahog looking for Belvedere.

In the final level of the game, Peter decides to drown his sorrows at the Drunken Clam. There, he is confronted by Belvedere, who rips off a disguise revealing none other than the Giant Chicken. In the final battle of the game, Peter defeats the Chicken, and just barely escapes a massive explosion in a penthouse, landing safely on top of Meg who, along with Lois and Chris, had inexplicably been standing in the middle of the street. After getting up from Meg and rejoining his family, Peter sees the Belvedere spotlight again which turns out to be Mayor Adam West (which almost starts referencing the Batman TV series) making shadow puppets. The Chicken, as always, ends up surviving.

== Development ==
Take-Two Interactive had attained these rights to publish a Family Guy video game by February 2005, before the series' revival episode "North by North Quahog" had aired. No further developments were shown until during March 2006, when Take-Two subsidiary 2K Games had acquired these publishing rights, with High Voltage Software to fill in for development. The game predominantly uses the voice cast of the television series, and a cel-shaded visual style. The game was exhibited at Electronic Entertainment Expo 2006. Versions for GameCube and PC were also announced but were never released.

== Reception ==
Reception

Aggregate score
| Aggregator | Score | | |
| Aggregator | PS2 | PSP | Xbox |
|---|---|---|---|
| Metacritic | 50/100 | 51/100 | 53/100 |

Review scores
| Publication | Score | | |
| Publication | PS2 | PSP | Xbox |
|---|---|---|---|
| Eurogamer | 3/10 | N/A | N/A |
| Game Informer | 5.5/10 | N/A | 5.5/10 |
| GamePro | 3.25/5 | N/A | N/A |
| GameRevolution | C− | N/A | C− |
| GameSpot | 6.4/10 | 6.4/10 | 6.4/10 |
| GameSpy | 2/5 | 2/5 | 2/5 |
| GameZone | 5.3/10 | 5.4/10 | 6.3/10 |
| IGN | 4.1/10 | 4.1/10 | 4.1/10 |
| Official U.S. PlayStation Magazine | 5/10 | 5/10 | N/A |
| Official Xbox Magazine (US) | N/A | N/A | 3.5/10 |
| The A.V. Club | D | D | D |
| The Times | 3/5 | 3/5 | 3/5 |

Family Guy Video Game! received "mixed" reviews on all platforms according to the review aggregation website Metacritic.

The Times gave the game three stars out of five and said, "Though voiced and scripted by the people behind the TV show, the game is lightweight, and its quirky navigation and control issues make it one for serious fans only." However, 411Mania gave the PlayStation 2 version five out of ten and stated: "The levels are far too simplistic and repetitive for mature gamers to get into. However, with concepts like jumping on pregnant women's stomachs to shoot babies out and prisoners in the shower scrubbing each other down, this game is in no way kid friendly. I guess if you're a fan of the show you may enjoy it, but even then you'd have to be a hardcore fan and not mind all the work involved wading through frustrating game play to get to a punch line you can hear on the show every 2 minutes." The A.V. Club gave the game a D and stated that it was "littered with gags that flop, and knock-offs from the TV show that look terrible [...] The writing is crass enough to earn a "Mature" rating, yet Family Guy plays like it's meant for 6-year-olds. And somehow, watching the characters beat up old people, kids, and women—and you will beat and kill hundreds of women if you want to progress—isn't so hilarious when you're at the controls."

== Sequel ==
The game's follow-up, Family Guy: Back to the Multiverse, is based on the 2009 episode "Road to the Multiverse". Developed by Heavy Iron Studios and published by Activision, it was released on November 20, 2012, in North America, in Australia on the following day, and on November 23, 2012, in Europe.
