= Family Guy: Back to the Multiverse =

2012 video game

- North American box cover
- Developer: Heavy Iron Studios
- Publisher: Activision
- Directors: Christopher Cross; Dellekamp Siefert; Marc Vulcano
- Producer: Diana Wu
- Designers: Brian McInerny; Justin Norr; Michael Light; Timmy Jordan
- Programmer: Amrit Dharwadkar
- Artists: Dorothy Chen; Sean Ho; Chris McLeod
- Writers: Anthony Blasucci; Mike Desilets
- Composer: Walter Murphy
- Platforms: Microsoft Windows; PlayStation 3; Xbox 360
- Release: NA: November 20, 2012; AU: November 21, 2012; EU: November 23, 2012
- Genres: Action-adventure; Third-person shooter
- Modes: Single-player, multiplayer

Family Guy: Back to the Multiverse is an action-adventure third-person shooter video game developed by Heavy Iron Studios and published by Activision. The game is based on the American animated television series Family Guy and serves as a sequel to the episodes "Road to the Multiverse" and "The Big Bang Theory". The game was released in North America on November 20, 2012, in Australia on November 21, and in Europe on November 23 for Microsoft Windows, PlayStation 3, and Xbox 360. Versions for the Nintendo 3DS and Wii were planned but later canceled. It was the first Family Guy console game since Family Guy Video Game! (2006).

Upon release, Family Guy: Back to the Multiverse received negative reviews. While the game’s humor, characters, and voice acting were praised, critics criticized its gameplay, graphics, and story. Players who pre-ordered the game received access to a special level based on Aliens: Colonial Marines, another video game based on the Aliens franchise owned by 20th Century Studios. That game was released the following February to similarly negative reception.

In December 2014, Family Guy: Back to the Multiverse was removed from Steam.

== Gameplay ==
Players control Stewie Griffin and Brian Griffin in an adventure that pits them against Stewie’s evil half-brother, Bertram. Back to the Multiverse features both cooperative and competitive multiplayer modes centered around the characters. Additional challenge levels, multiplayer maps, costumes, and playable Family Guy characters are unlocked through gameplay.

== Plot ==
Brian and Stewie are spending time at home when Bertram suddenly appears. Although Stewie previously killed Bertram, Bertram explains that he originates from an alternate universe in which he survived. Disgusted by the existence of a universe without him, Bertram announces his plan to assemble an army from across the multiverse and destroy Stewie’s universe. After Bertram escapes using a multiverse remote, Stewie and Brian pursue him across several alternate universes.

Along the way, the two battle various enemies recruited by Bertram, including Ernie the Giant Chicken, Long John Peter, Evil Stewie, Crippletron, Santa Claus and his mutated elves from "Road to the North Pole". Stewie and Brian travel through seven universes across ten levels in an attempt to stop him.

Upon returning to their universe, Stewie and Brian discover their town in chaos. Bertram reveals that he never intended to build an army from the universes they visited, but instead lured them into dangerous environments while his assistant Gus assembled an army of alternate versions of Bertram. Bertram also unveils a bomb capable of exploiting tears in reality caused by interdimensional travel, which would destroy Stewie’s universe entirely.

Stewie and Brian battle Bertram’s army and a weaponized Tyrannosaurus rex before confronting Bertram at the Griffin house. The game features two endings depending on the player’s performance during the final battle.

- In the first ending, Stewie and Brian defeat the Tyrannosaurus, and Bertram is devoured by the creature before it is killed. The Griffin family celebrates their survival, although Brian worries another version of Bertram may eventually appear. Stewie responds by joking that it depends on the game’s sales, breaking the fourth wall.
- In the alternate ending, the Tyrannosaurus reaches the Griffin house and Bertram activates his bomb before escaping the universe. The world is destroyed, and Peter Griffin appears drifting through space while saying, "You lose".

== Development ==
According to Unseen64, versions for the Wii and Nintendo 3DS were planned but canceled in August 2011. A former employee of Heavy Iron Studios stated that the cancellations were due to the studio’s focus on "making one version of the game" and concerns about how the game would perform on those platforms. As a result, the game was not released for any Nintendo platforms.

== Reception ==
Reception

Aggregate score
Aggregator	Score		
Aggregator	PC	PS3	Xbox 360
Metacritic	42/100	40/100	39/100

Review scores
Publication	Score		
Publication	PC	PS3	Xbox 360
Destructoid	N/A	N/A	2/10
Electronic Gaming Monthly	N/A	N/A	5.5/10
Game Informer	N/A	N/A	4.5/10
GameZone	N/A	N/A	2/10
Giant Bomb	N/A	N/A	1/5
IGN	N/A	6/10	6/10
PlayStation Official Magazine – Australia	N/A	6/10	N/A
Official Xbox Magazine (US)	N/A	N/A	4.5/10
PC Gamer (UK)	20%	N/A	N/A
Polygon	N/A	N/A	3/10
Digital Spy	N/A	N/A	1/5
Metro	N/A	N/A	2/10

Family Guy: Back to the Multiverse received "generally unfavorable" reviews on all platforms according to the review aggregation website Metacritic.

Andrew Reiner of Game Informer said that half of the Xbox 360 version is done exceptionally well, while the other half is the polar opposite. He also stated, "The gameplay could fuel any generic shooter, and doesn't feel like it belongs with this property." The game received a mixed review from IGN who said of the PlayStation 3 and Xbox 360 versions, "There's a lot to enjoy, but none of it will knock your socks off." Official Xbox Magazine UK's review was a questionnaire in which the reader could score the game themselves, with the final score out of ten being decided by how many boxes they ticked, the final box being "I'm a frothing imbecile who deserves nothing of value in my life." The review concluded that the game was for "no-one. Not even people who like the TV show" and "These writers hate humanity." The only positive mention given of the game was "It certainly looks the part."

Edd Harwood of The Digital Fix gave the PS3 version three out of ten, saying that it was "a really bad game. It is not the worst game though because some games I play do not work sometimes or are even more stupid. Family Guy: Back to the Multiverse is at least a game that I can play and shoot things, and maybe laugh at something that reminds me of the show. But the shooting is really bad. The multiplayer is also not so bad. But I would much rather watch the show. Or play something else." Digital Spy gave the Xbox 360 version one star out of five and stated, "There is surely scope to make a decent Family Guy game - just imagine an adventure or puzzle title littered with acerbic humor and smart observations. But as a shooter, Back to the Multiverse is a hopelessly moronic, completely pointless experience that will please neither Family Guy fans nor people who enjoy games. In this case, the joke is most definitely on us." Metro GameCentral gave said console version a similar score of a two out of ten and called it "a return to the very worst standards of video game tie-ins, with terrible gameplay and an equally incompetent attempt to mimic the show's humour."
