= Kirker Butler =

American writer

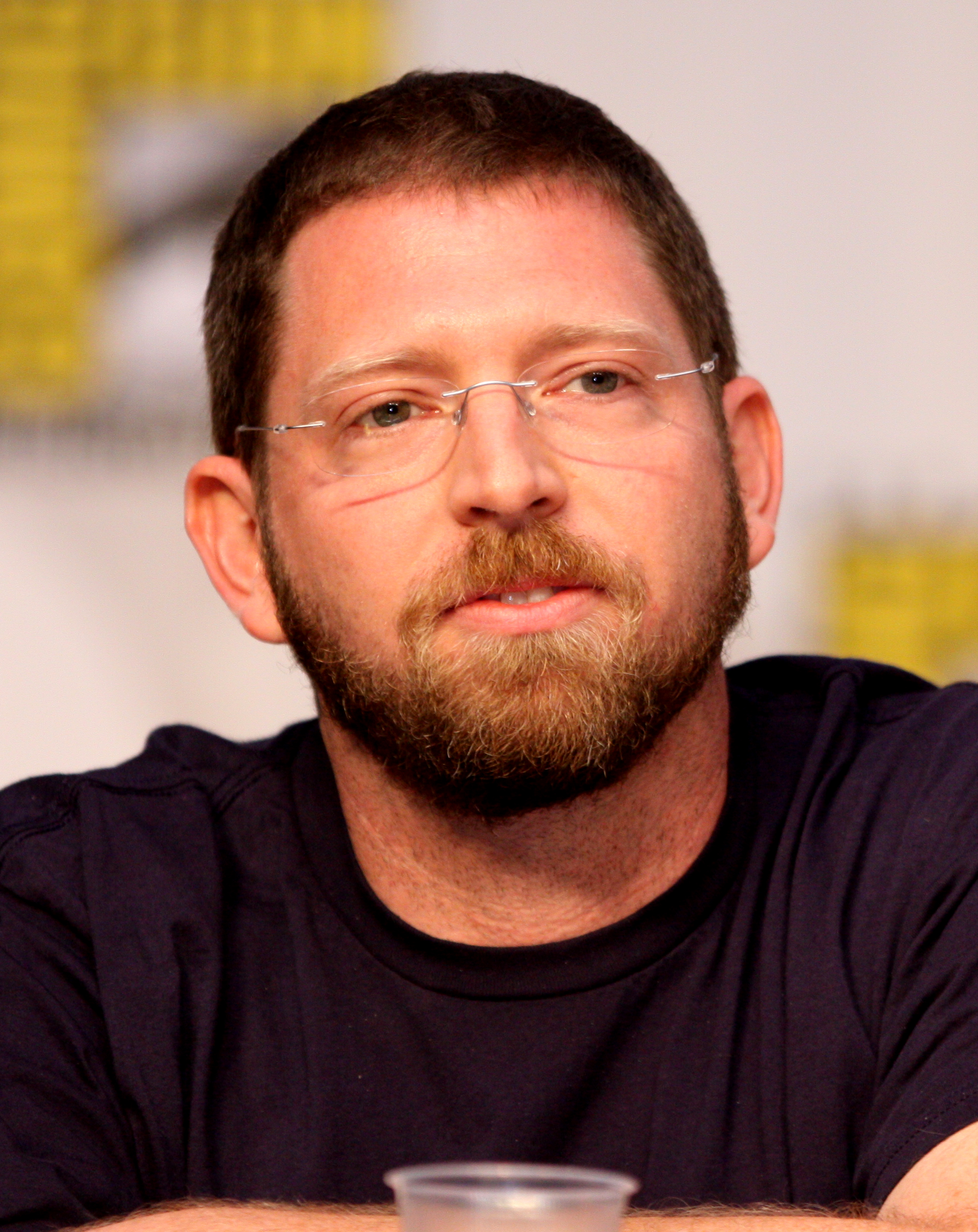
- Butler at San Diego Comic-Con in July 2010.
- Born: Kirker Butler; February 14, 1971 (age 55); Hartford, Kentucky
- Occupation: Writer
- Years active: 1999-present

Kirker Butler (born February 14, 1971) is an American television producer and writer, who has worked on such shows as Family Guy, The Cleveland Show, The Neighbors, Galavant, and Only Murders in the Building, as well as the co-creator for the Family Guy spin-off Stewie.

== Career ==
Butler joined Family Guy in 2004, and has since produced and written multiple episodes, including: "Padre de Familia" "Barely Legal" "Hell Comes to Quahog" "The Courtship of Stewie's Father" and the Star Wars: Episode V - The Empire Strikes Back parody "Something, Something, Something, Dark Side".

He has been nominated for 3 Emmy Awards for his work on Family Guy, The Cleveland Show, and Only Murders in the Building.

He is the author of the novel Pretty Ugly.

In 2020, he was added to the Barn Theatre, Michigan's wall of fame, having studied at the school in 1992 and 1993.

In March 2026, it has been announced that he will be the co-creator (alongside Seth MacFarlane) of the upcoming Family Guy spin-off Stewie, which has been greenlit for two seasons.
