= When You Wish Upon a Weinstein =

- Family Guy episode
- Episode no.: Season 3 Episode 22
- Directed by: Dan Povenmire
- Written by: Ricky Blitt
- Production code: 2ACX05
- Original air date: November 9, 2003 (Note: The episode was first released on the Volume 2: Season 3 DVD set on September 9, 2003 as a bonus episode.)

Guest appearances
- Andrea Beutener; Mark Hamill as Luke Skywalker and Obi-Wan Kenobi; Phil LaMarr; Ed McMahon as himself; Peter Riegert as Max Weinstein; Mary Scheer; Ben Stein as Rabbi Goldberg; Nicole Sullivan

Episode chronology
← Previous "Family Guy Viewer Mail #1"	Next → "North by North Quahog"
- Family Guy season 3

"When You Wish Upon a Weinstein" is the twenty-second and final episode of the third season of the American animated series Family Guy, and the 50th episode overall. The episode was intended to air on Fox in 2000, but Fox's executives expressed concern due to the content's potential to be interpreted as antisemitic, and did not allow it to air on television that year. The episode originally aired on Cartoon Network's adult-oriented Adult Swim block on November 9, 2003, and on Fox on December 10, 2004. In the episode, Peter prays for a Jew to help him with his financial woes. After befriending Jewish accountant Max Weinstein and discovering the wonders of their religion, Peter gets the idea of converting Chris to Judaism so he will be successful in life. Lois attempts to stop him, believing that success is not based on religion.

"When You Wish Upon a Weinstein" was written by Ricky Blitt and directed by Dan Povenmire. This episode features guest performances from Andrea Beutener, Mark Hamill, Phil LaMarr, Ed McMahon, Peter Riegert, Mary Scheer, Ben Stein, and Nicole Sullivan.

== Plot ==
Peter gives Lois's "rainy-day fund" to Jim Kaplan, a scam artist selling volcano insurance. That night, Stewie breaks Meg's glasses because he hates being watched while he sleeps. Lois tells Peter that he needs to recover the money to buy their daughter a new pair of glasses. After hearing Quagmire and Cleveland talk about how men with Jewish-sounding names have helped them achieve financial success, Peter decides that he needs a Jew to handle his money in an elaborate musical number.

When a Jewish man named Max Weinstein (/ˈwaɪnstiːn/) has car trouble outside the Griffin house, Peter takes it as a sign. After a foot chase, Peter pressures Max into helping him get the emergency money back, and he recovers the money from Kaplan. After inviting Max to dinner and accompanying him to a Reform synagogue, Peter comes to the conclusion that Chris would become smart and successful if he converted to Judaism. The two sneakily drive to Las Vegas for a quickie Bar Mitzvah.

Lois learns of the Bar Mitzvah from Brian (by means of torturing him with a dog whistle), and borrows Quagmire's car. She arrives just in time to stop the ceremony, but the congregants, angry that Lois is apparently insulting their religion, attack the Griffins. The family escapes just in time, locking the synagogue's door using a large star of David and getting back home on a bus. Lois points out that one's success is not based upon religion, and Peter realizes the error of his ways and makes up to the family. However, as it turns out, the bus is full of nuns who, displeased that Peter strayed from Catholicism, attack the family with rulers.

== Cultural references ==
The episode title alludes to the Disney song "When You Wish Upon a Star"; and Peter's song, "I Need a Jew", is a parody of the same song. The scene in which Lois tries to stop the Bar Mitzvah is a parody of the ending of the film The Graduate (1967).

== Production ==
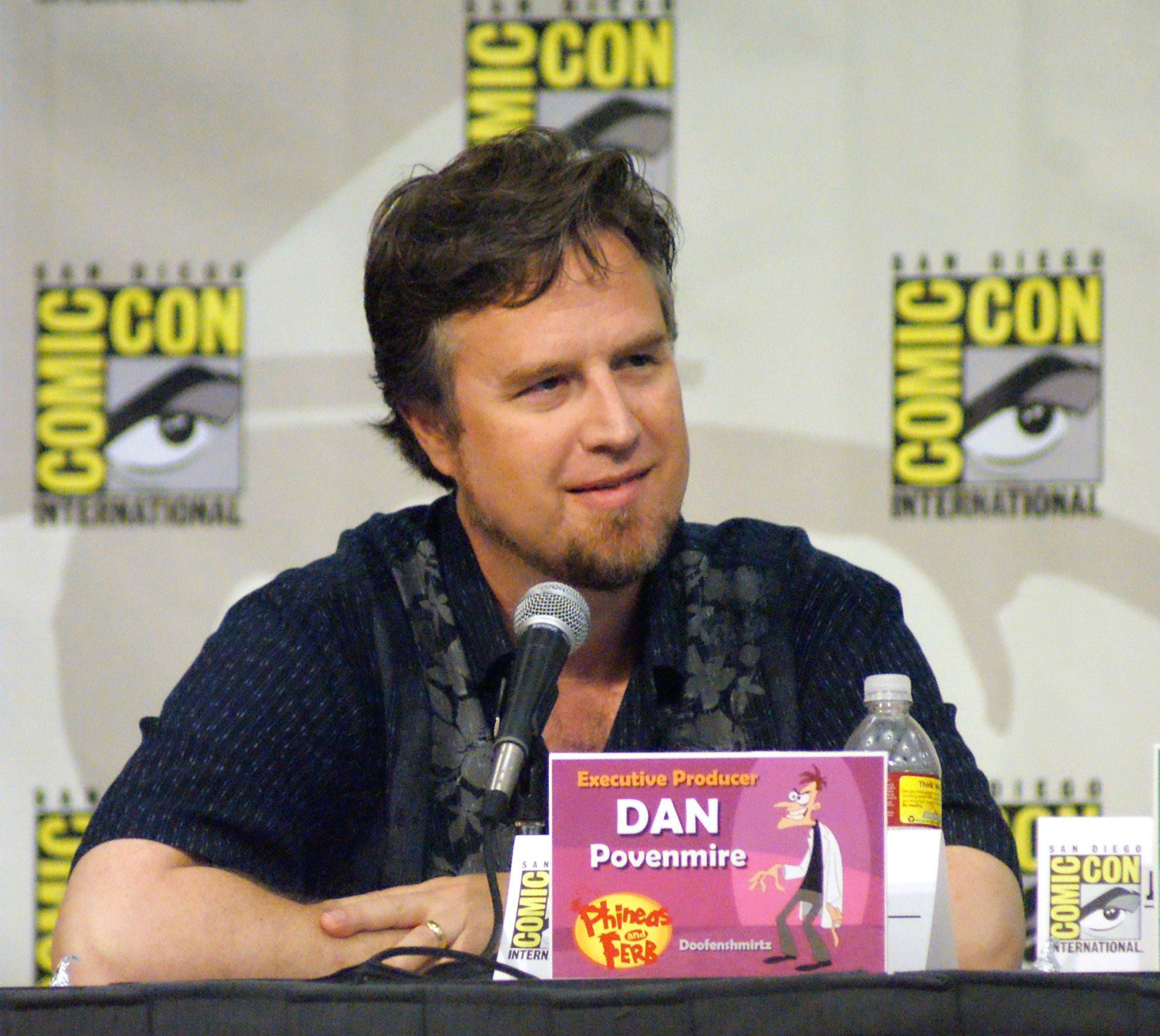
Phineas and Ferb co-creator Dan Povenmire directed the episode.

"When You Wish Upon a Weinstein" was written by Ricky Blitt and directed by Dan Povenmire.

In addition to the regular cast, voice actress Andrea Beutener, actor Mark Hamill, voice actor Phil LaMarr, actor Ed McMahon, actor Peter Riegert, actress Mary Scheer, actor Ben Stein, and voice actress Nicole Sullivan guest starred in the episode. Recurring guest voices in the episode include Mike Barker, Ricky Blitt, Mike Henry, Danny Smith, and Wally Wingert.

When the episode initially began production, it had the production code 2ACX02, as seen on its table read for March 17, 1999. The production code was eventually pushed up to 2ACX05.

Despite the episode airing during the third season in 2003, it was produced in 2000 and is a holdover from the second season production. Fox network executives were concerned that the episode could be construed as antisemitic, and decided not to air the episode after it had completed post production. It aired on Cartoon Network's programming block Adult Swim in 2003, and then it aired on Fox in 2004.

On the DVD commentary for the episode, Seth MacFarlane mentions that he showed the script of the episode to two rabbis, both of whom approved the episode "because Peter learns the right lesson at the end". MacFarlane also points out that 70% of the show's writers are Jewish, including Ricky Blitt, who wrote the episode, as is Ben Stein, who plays the Rabbi.

== Reception and lawsuit ==
Lisa Keys of The Forward wrote that the episode is "not necessarily demeaning to Jews" but "too vapid to be funny".

On October 3, 2007, the Bourne Company publishing house, sole owner of the song "When You Wish Upon a Star", filed a lawsuit against several Fox divisions, Cartoon Network, Fuzzy Door Productions, Family Guy producer Seth MacFarlane and composer Walter Murphy, claiming copyright infringement over "I Need a Jew", seeking unspecified damages and to halt the program's distribution. The suit claims harm to the value of the song due to the offensive nature of the lyrics.

On March 17, 2009, U.S. District Judge Deborah Batts ruled that the creators of Family Guy did not infringe on Bourne's copyright.
