= Family Guy =

American animated sitcom

- Genre: Animated sitcom
- Created by: Seth MacFarlane
- Developed by: Seth MacFarlane; David Zuckerman
- Showrunners: Seth MacFarlane; David Zuckerman; Daniel Palladino; David A. Goodman; Chris Sheridan; Mark Hentemann; Steve Callaghan; Alec Sulkin; Richard Appel
- Voices of: Seth MacFarlane; Alex Borstein; Seth Green; Mila Kunis; Mike Henry; Patrick Warburton; Arif Zahir
- Theme music composer: Walter Murphy
- Composers: Ron Jones; Walter Murphy
- Country of origin: United States
- Original language: English
- No. of seasons: 25
- No. of episodes: 462 (list of episodes)

Production
- Executive producers: Seth MacFarlane; David Zuckerman; Daniel Palladino; David A. Goodman; Chris Sheridan; Danny Smith; Mark Hentemann; Steve Callaghan; Alec Sulkin; Wellesley Wild; Cherry Chevapravatdumrong; Kara Vallow; Richard Appel; Patrick Meighan; Tom Devanney; Alex Carter
- Producers: Shannon Smith; Kim Fertman; Julius Sharpe; Steve Marmel; Sherry Gunther
- Running time: 20–27 minutes; 33–88 minutes (select episodes)
- Production companies: Fuzzy Door Productions; 20th Television (Note: Credited as 20th Century Fox Television until season 18.) (seasons 1–19); 20th Television Animation (Note: Credited as Fox Television Animation until season 18. FTA later became 20th Television Animation during the 19th season. Took over animation from Film Roman after the first production season.) (season 20–present)

Original release
- Network: Fox (Note: Episode 50, "When You Wish Upon a Weinstein", was first broadcast on Adult Swim and episode 147, "Partial Terms of Endearment", was first broadcast on BBC Three in the United Kingdom. Select episodes have been released exclusively on streaming service Hulu in the U.S. and on the Star hub of Disney+ internationally since 2024.)
- Release: January 31, 1999 – February 14, 2002 (Note: While the series originally made its official end on February 14, 2002, "When You Wish Upon a Weinstein" was first broadcast on Adult Swim on November 9, 2003; the episode would later premiere on Fox on December 10, 2004.)
- Release: May 1, 2005 – present

Related
- The Life of Larry and Larry & Steve; The Cleveland Show; Stewie

Family Guy is an American animated sitcom created by Seth MacFarlane for the Fox Broadcasting Company. The series premiered on January 31, 1999, following Super Bowl XXXIII, with the rest of the first season airing from April 11, 1999. The show centers around the Griffins, a dysfunctional family consisting of parents Peter and Lois, their children, Meg, Chris, and Stewie, and their anthropomorphic pet dog, Brian. Set in the fictional city of Quahog, Rhode Island, the show exhibits much of its humor in the form of cutaway gags that often lampoon American culture.

The family was conceived by MacFarlane after he developed two animated films, The Life of Larry and Larry & Steve. MacFarlane redesigned the films' protagonist, Larry, and his dog, Steve, and renamed them Peter and Brian, respectively. MacFarlane pitched a fifteen-minute pilot to Fox in May 1998, and the show was greenlit and began production. Family Guy's cancellation was announced shortly after the third season had aired in 2002, with one unaired episode eventually premiering on Adult Swim in 2003, finishing the series' original run. Favorable DVD sales and high ratings from syndicated reruns since then convinced Fox to revive the show in 2004; a fourth season began airing the following year, premiering on May 1, 2005; the show has remained on the air ever since.

Family Guy received generally positive reviews during its first seven seasons. Since then, the series has received criticism for a perceived decline in quality. In 2009, it was nominated for a Primetime Emmy Award for Outstanding Comedy Series, the first time an animated series had been nominated for the award since The Flintstones in 1961. In 2013, TV Guide ranked Family Guy as the ninth-greatest TV cartoon. The series has drawn significant criticism for its storylines, humor, and character portrayals, including allegations of racism, sexism, homophobia, and reliance on offensive stereotypes, shock humor, and graphic violence.

Many tie-in media based on the show have been released, including Stewie Griffin: The Untold Story, a straight-to-DVD special released in 2005; Family Guy: Live in Vegas, a soundtrack-DVD combo released in 2005, featuring music from the show as well as music created by MacFarlane and Walter Murphy; a video game and pinball machine, released in 2006 and 2007, respectively; since 2005, six books published by Harper Adult; and Laugh It Up, Fuzzball: The Family Guy Trilogy (2010), a collection of three episodes parodying the original Star Wars trilogy. A spin-off series, The Cleveland Show, featuring Cleveland Brown, aired from September 27, 2009 to May 19, 2013.

On April 2, 2025, it was announced that Family Guy would be renewed for four more seasons in what is considered a "mega deal" with parent company Disney. This renewal will take the show through the 2028–29 television season. The twenty-fourth season premiered in October 2025, and regular episodes premiered on February 15, 2026.

In March 2026, it was announced that a second spin-off series, Stewie, was given a two-season order for Fox. Stewie is set to premiere during the 2027–28 season.

== Premise ==
=== Characters ===
The Griffin family. From left: Chris, Peter, Stewie (in baby carrier), Lois, Brian (dog in front), and Meg.

The show centers around the adventures and activities of the dysfunctional Griffin family, consisting of father Peter Griffin, a bumbling and clumsy blue-collar worker; his wife Lois, a stay-at-home mother and piano teacher (in early episodes) who is a member of the affluent Pewterschmidt family; Meg, their often bullied teenage daughter who is constantly ridiculed or ignored by the family; Chris, their awkward teenage son, who is overweight, unintelligent, unathletic, and in many respects a younger version of his father; and Stewie, their diabolical, adult-mannered infant son of ambiguous sexual orientation who is an evil genius and uses stereotypical archvillain phrases. Living with the family is their witty, smoking, martini-swilling, sarcastic, English-speaking anthropomorphic pet dog Brian, although he is still considered a pet in many ways.

Recurring characters appear alongside the Griffin family. These include the family's neighbors: sex-crazed airline pilot bachelor Glenn Quagmire; deli owner/mail carrier Cleveland Brown and his wife Loretta (later Donna); paraplegic police officer Joe Swanson, his wife Bonnie, their son Kevin and their baby daughter Susie; neurotic Jewish pharmacist Mort Goldman, his wife Muriel, and their geeky and annoying son Neil, and elderly child molester Herbert. TV news anchors Tom Tucker and Diane Simmons, Asian reporter Tricia Takanawa, and Blaccu-Weather meteorologist Ollie Williams also make frequent appearances. Actor James Woods guest stars as himself in multiple episodes, as did Adam West as a fictionalized version of himself who served as Quahog's mayor, prior to his death.

=== Setting ===
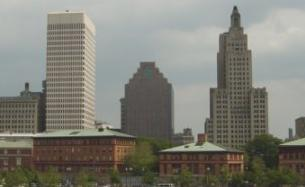
The skyline of Providence, Rhode Island

How it was referenced in the show

The primary setting of Family Guy is Quahog (/ˈk(w)oʊhɒɡ/ K(W)OH-hog), a fictional city in Rhode Island that was founded by Peter's ancestor, Griffin Peterson. MacFarlane resided in Providence during his time as a student at the Rhode Island School of Design (RISD), and the show contains distinct Rhode Island landmarks similar to real-world locations.

== Episodes ==
Season	Episodes	Originally released			Rank	Average viewers (in millions)
Season	Episodes	First released	Last released	Network	Rank	Average viewers (in millions)
Pilot		1998		N/A	TBA	TBA
1	7	January 31, 1999	May 16, 1999	Fox	33	14.12
2	21	September 23, 1999	August 1, 2000	Fox	114	6.74
3	22 (Note: Season 3 officially ended on February 14, 2002 with 21 episodes. Episode 22 was first released on DVD before making its first broadcast on Adult Swim; the episode would later premiere on Fox on December 10, 2004.)	July 11, 2001	November 9, 2003	Fox	125	4.50
4	30	May 1, 2005	May 21, 2006	Fox	68	7.90
5	18	September 10, 2006	May 20, 2007	Fox	71	8.69
6	12	September 23, 2007	May 4, 2008	Fox	84	7.94
7	16	September 28, 2008	May 17, 2009	Fox	69	7.56
8	21 (Note: Season 8 officially ended on May 23, 2010 with 20 episodes. Episode 21 was first broadcast on BBC Three in the UK on June 20, 2010, before debuting in the US on DVD on September 28, 2010.)	September 27, 2009	June 20, 2010	Fox	53	7.73
9	18	September 26, 2010	May 22, 2011	Fox	56	7.66
10	23	September 25, 2011	May 20, 2012	Fox	63	7.30
11	22	September 30, 2012	May 19, 2013	Fox	62	6.94
12	21	September 29, 2013	May 18, 2014	Fox	78	6.11
13	18	September 28, 2014	May 17, 2015	Fox	94	5.86
14	20	September 27, 2015	May 22, 2016	Fox	111	4.28
15	20	September 25, 2016	May 21, 2017	Fox	116	3.93
16	20	October 1, 2017	May 20, 2018	Fox	136	3.52
17	20	September 30, 2018	May 12, 2019	Fox	131	3.33
18	20	September 29, 2019	May 17, 2020	Fox	107	2.65
19	20	September 27, 2020	May 16, 2021	Fox	120	2.19
20	20	September 26, 2021	May 22, 2022	Fox	111	1.9
21	20	September 25, 2022	May 7, 2023	Fox	104	1.64
22	15	October 1, 2023	April 17, 2024	Fox	115	1.44
23	20^{[n1]}	October 14, 2024	July 17, 2025	Fox; Hulu	N/A	N/A
24	17^{[n2]}	October 6, 2025	May 17, 2026	Fox; Hulu	N/A	N/A
25	17^{[n2]}	October 5, 2026	TBA	Fox; Hulu	TBA	TBA

Notes

1. Season 23 had eighteen episodes broadcast on Fox, and two are Hulu exclusives that are not a part of the normal season.
2. Season 24 had fifteen episodes broadcast on Fox, with an additional two Hulu exclusives that are not a part of the normal season.

== Production ==
=== Development ===
MacFarlane conceived Family Guy in 1995 while studying animation at the Rhode Island School of Design. During college, he created his thesis film titled The Life of Larry, which was submitted by his professor at RISD to Hanna-Barbera. MacFarlane was hired by the company. In 1996, MacFarlane created a sequel to The Life of Larry titled Larry and Steve, which featured a middle-aged character named Larry and an intellectual dog, named Steve; the short was broadcast in 1997 as one of Cartoon Network's World Premiere Toons.

Executives at Fox saw the Larry shorts and contracted MacFarlane to create a series, titled Family Guy, based on the characters. Fox proposed that MacFarlane complete a 15-minute short and gave him a budget of $50,000. MacFarlane pitched the completed demo short to Fox on May 15, 1998, which featured the first appearance of the Griffin family. The first seven minutes of the pitch pilot, which had a storyline parallel to the pilot that aired on television in January 1999, would be included in Family Guy DVD sets. The full fifteen-minute pitch demo remained lost until it was uploaded to the internet by Robert Paulson on his personal website in 2022. Despite this, the pitch demo was undiscovered until March 21, 2025.

Several aspects of Family Guy were inspired by the Larry shorts. While MacFarlane worked on the series, the characters of Larry and his dog Steve slowly evolved into Peter and Brian Griffin. MacFarlane stated that the difference between The Life of Larry and Family Guy was that "Life of Larry was shown primarily in my dorm room and Family Guy was shown after the Super Bowl."

Family Guy was originally planned to start out as short movies for the sketch show Mad TV, but the plan changed, because MADtv's budget was not large enough to support animation production. MacFarlane noted that he then wanted to pitch it to Fox, as he thought that it was the place to create a prime-time animation show. Family Guy was originally pitched to Fox in the same year as King of the Hill, but the show was not bought until years later, when King of the Hill became successful.

After the pilot episode of Family Guy aired, the series was given the greenlight. MacFarlane drew inspiration from several sitcoms such as The Simpsons and All in the Family. Premises were drawn from several 1980s Saturday-morning cartoons he watched as a child, such as The Fonz and the Happy Days Gang and Rubik, the Amazing Cube.

=== Renewals ===
On January 26, 2023, Fox announced that the series had been renewed for seasons 22 and 23, taking the show through the 2024–25 television season. Season 22 premiered on October 1, 2023. Season 23 premiered on February 16, 2025.

On April 2, 2025, it was announced that Family Guy would be renewed for four more seasons in what is considered a "mega deal" with parent company Disney. This renewal will take the show through the 2028–2029 television season, which coincides with the 30th anniversary of the shows' launch in January 1999. Additionally, each season will consist of 15 episodes.

=== Executive producers ===
MacFarlane has served as an executive producer throughout the show's entire history. The first executive producers were David Zuckerman, Lolee Aries, David Pritchard, and Mike Wolf. Family Guy has had many executive producers in its history, including Daniel Palladino, Kara Vallow, and Danny Smith. David A. Goodman joined the show as a co-executive producer in season three and eventually became an executive producer.

=== Writing ===
The first team of writers assembled for the show consisted of Chris Sheridan, Danny Smith, Gary Janetti, Ricky Blitt, Neil Goldman, Garrett Donovan, Matt Weitzman, and Mike Barker.

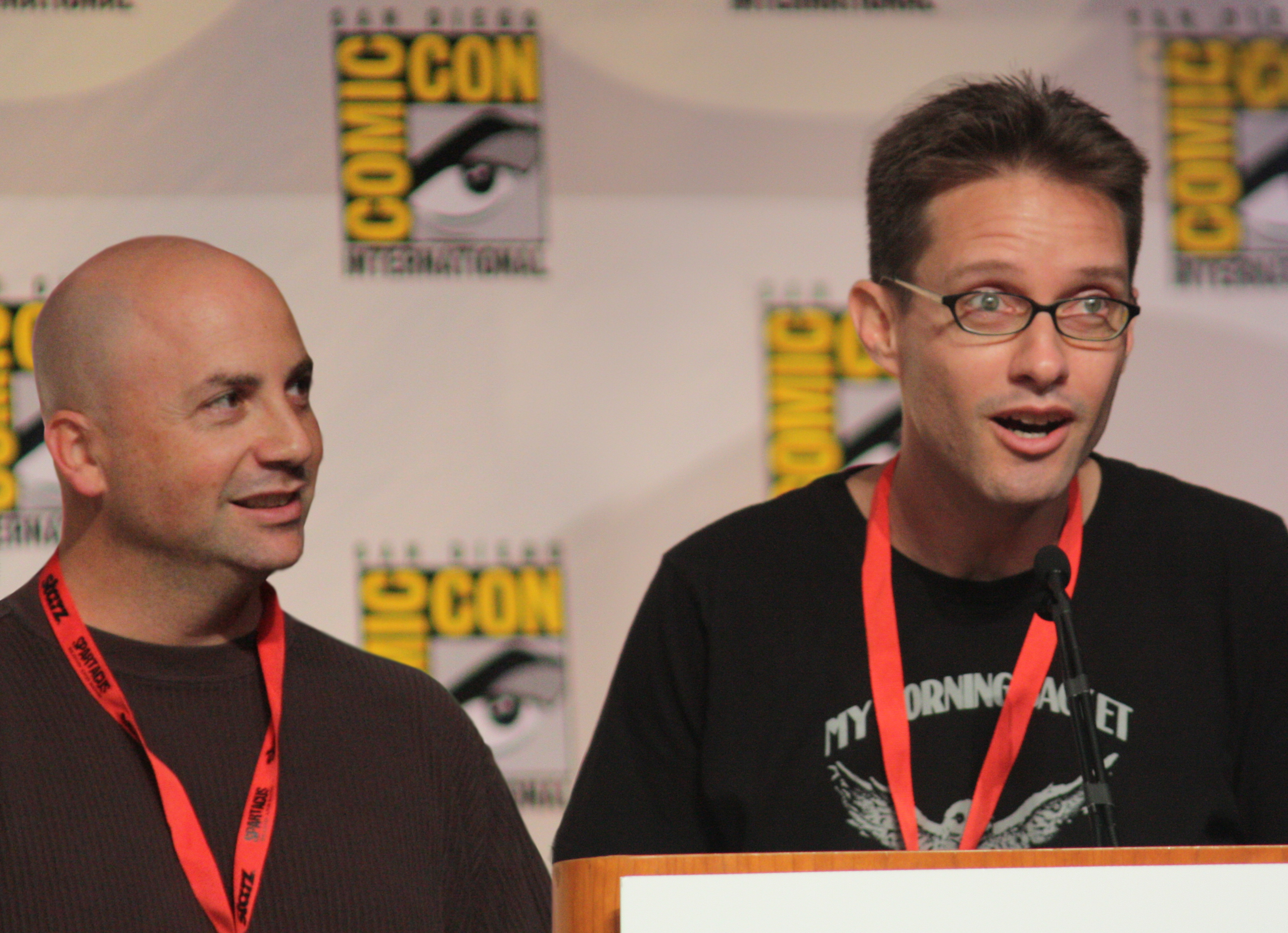
Matt Weitzman (left) is a former staff writer, and Mike Barker is a former producer and writer of the show. Both left the series to create the ongoing adult animated sitcom American Dad! with Seth MacFarlane. Barker later left American Dad! as well following production of the show's 10th season.

These scripts generally include cutaway gags. Various gags are pitched to MacFarlane and the rest of the staff, and those deemed the funniest are included in the episode. MacFarlane has explained that it normally takes 10 months to produce an episode because the show uses hand-drawn animation. The show rarely comments on current events for this reason. The show's initial writers had never written for an animated show, and most came from live-action sitcoms.

MacFarlane explained that he is a fan of 1930s and 1940s radio programs, particularly the radio thriller anthology Suspense, which led him to give early episodes ominous titles like "Death Has a Shadow" and "Mind Over Murder". MacFarlane said that the team dropped the naming convention after individual episodes became hard to identify, and the novelty wore off. For the first few months of production, the writers shared one office, lent to them by the King of the Hill production crew.

Credited with 19 episodes, Steve Callaghan is the most prolific writer on the Family Guy staff. Many of the writers that have left the show have gone on to create or produce other successful series. Neil Goldman and Garrett Donovan co-wrote 13 episodes for the NBC sitcom Scrubs during their eight-year run on the show, while also serving as co-producers and working their way up to executive producers. Mike Barker and Matt Weitzman left the show and went on to create the long-running and still ongoing adult animated series American Dad!. (MacFarlane is also a co-creator of American Dad!) On November 4, 2013, it was announced that Barker had departed American Dad! during its run as well, after 10 seasons of serving as producer and co-showrunner over the series.

During the 2007–08 Writers Guild of America strike, official production of the show halted for most of December 2007 and for various periods afterward. Fox continued producing episodes without MacFarlane's final approval, which he termed "a colossal dick move" in an interview with Variety. Though MacFarlane refused to work on the show, his contract under Fox required him to contribute to any episodes it would subsequently produce. Production officially resumed after the end of the strike, with regularly airing episodes recommencing on February 17, 2008. According to MacFarlane, in 2009, it cost about $2 million to make an episode of Family Guy.

During his September 2017 AMA on Reddit, MacFarlane revealed that he had not written for the show since 2010, choosing instead to focus on production and voice acting.

On May 12, 2023, it was announced that the showrunners of Family Guy, including Seth MacFarlane, would temporarily leave the show as a result of the 2023 Writers Guild of America Strike.

=== Voice cast ===
Main cast

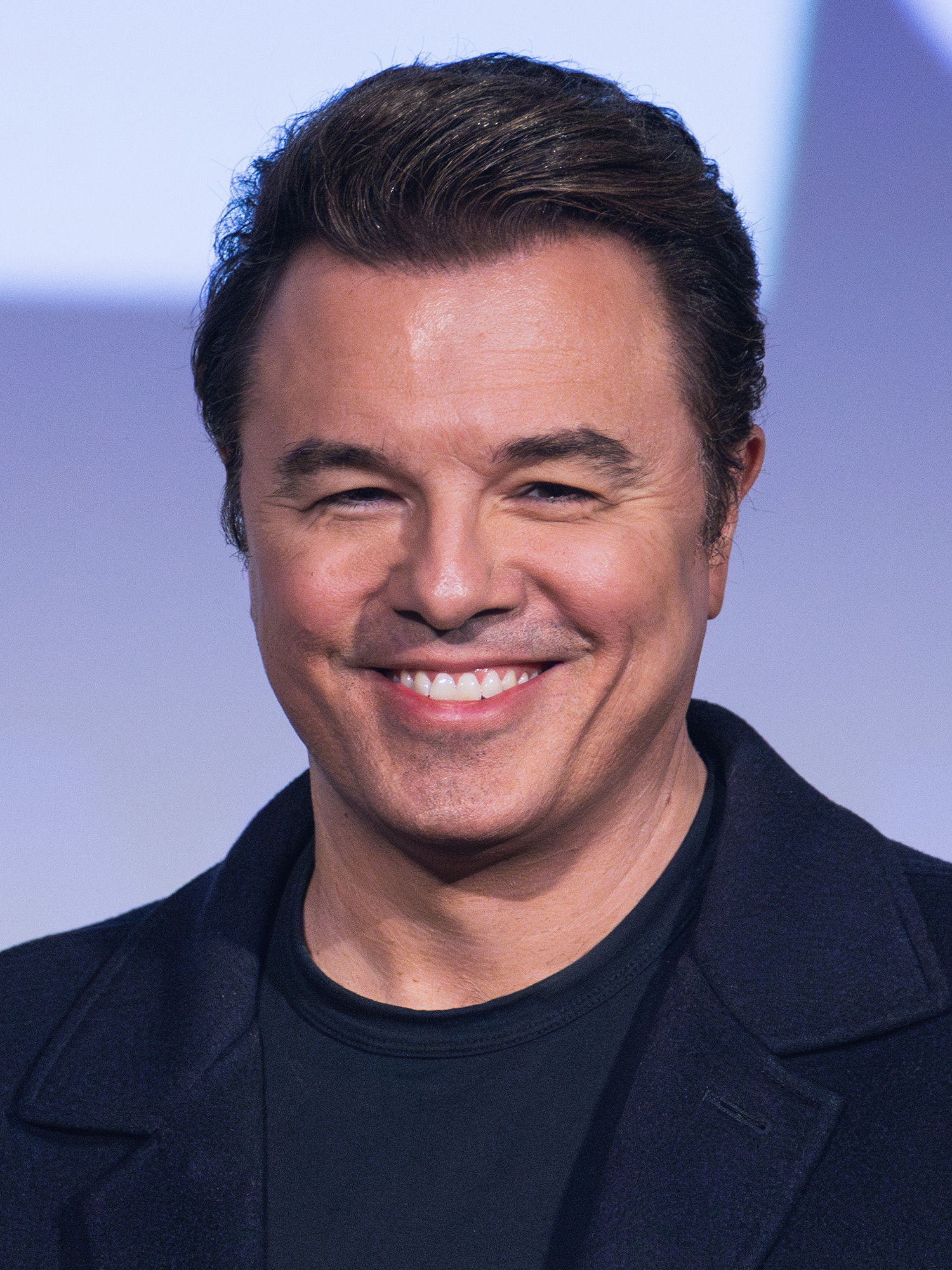
Seth MacFarlane

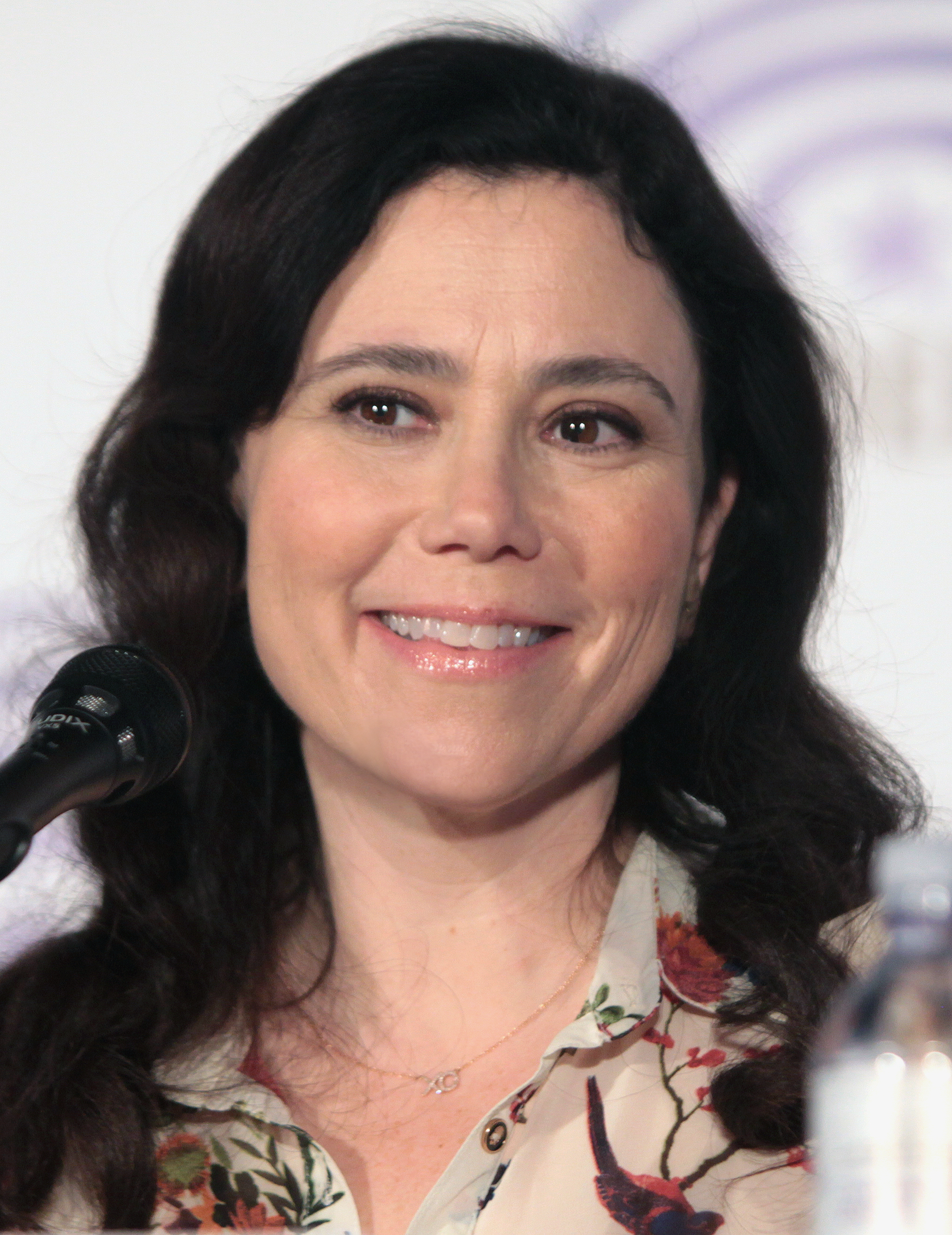
Alex Borstein

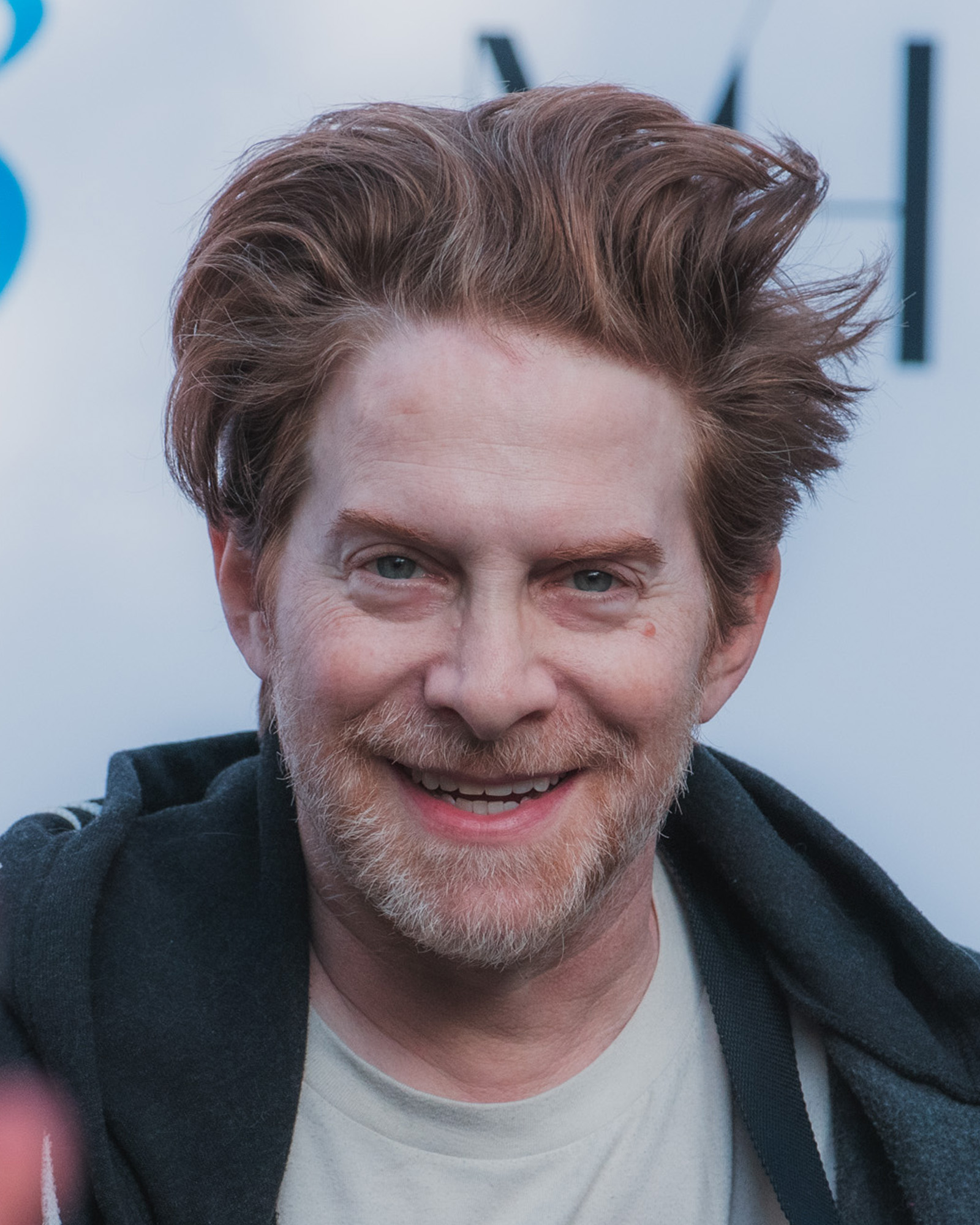
Seth Green

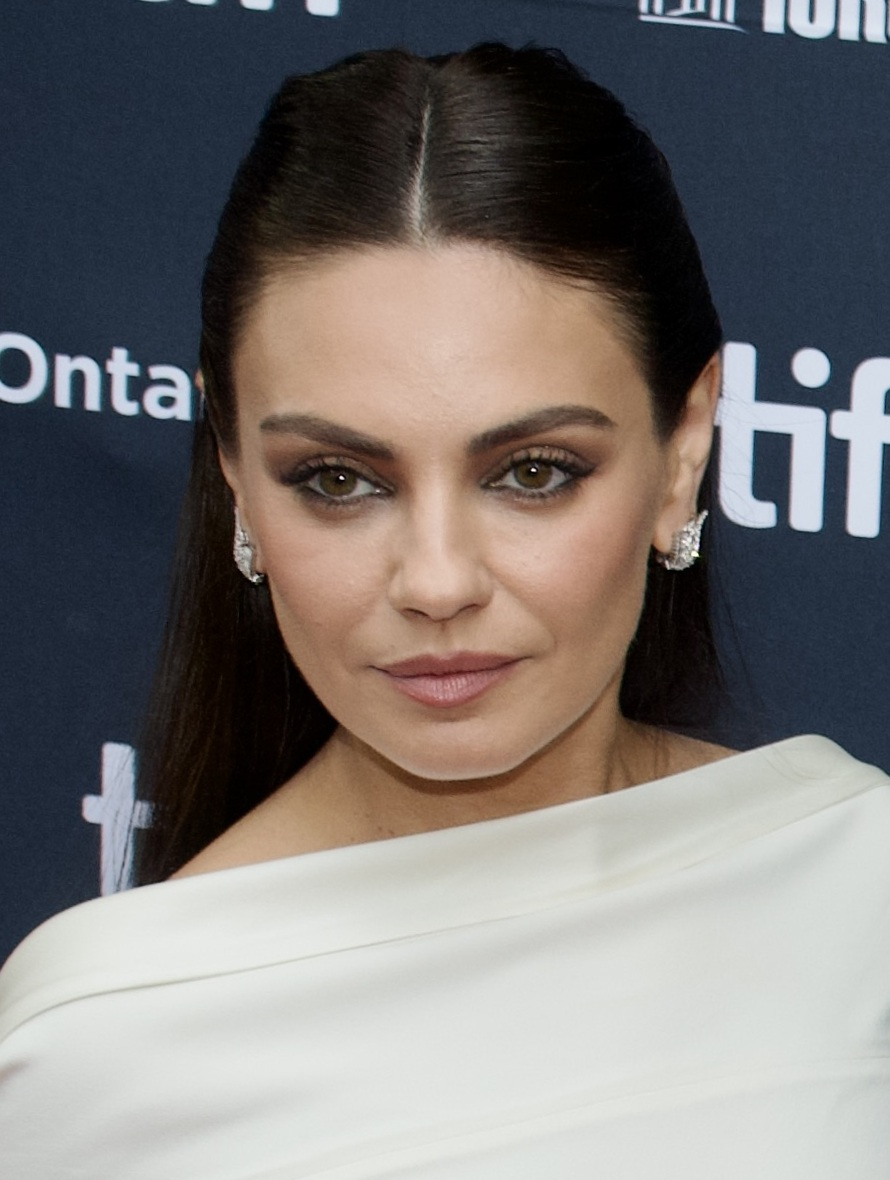
Mila Kunis

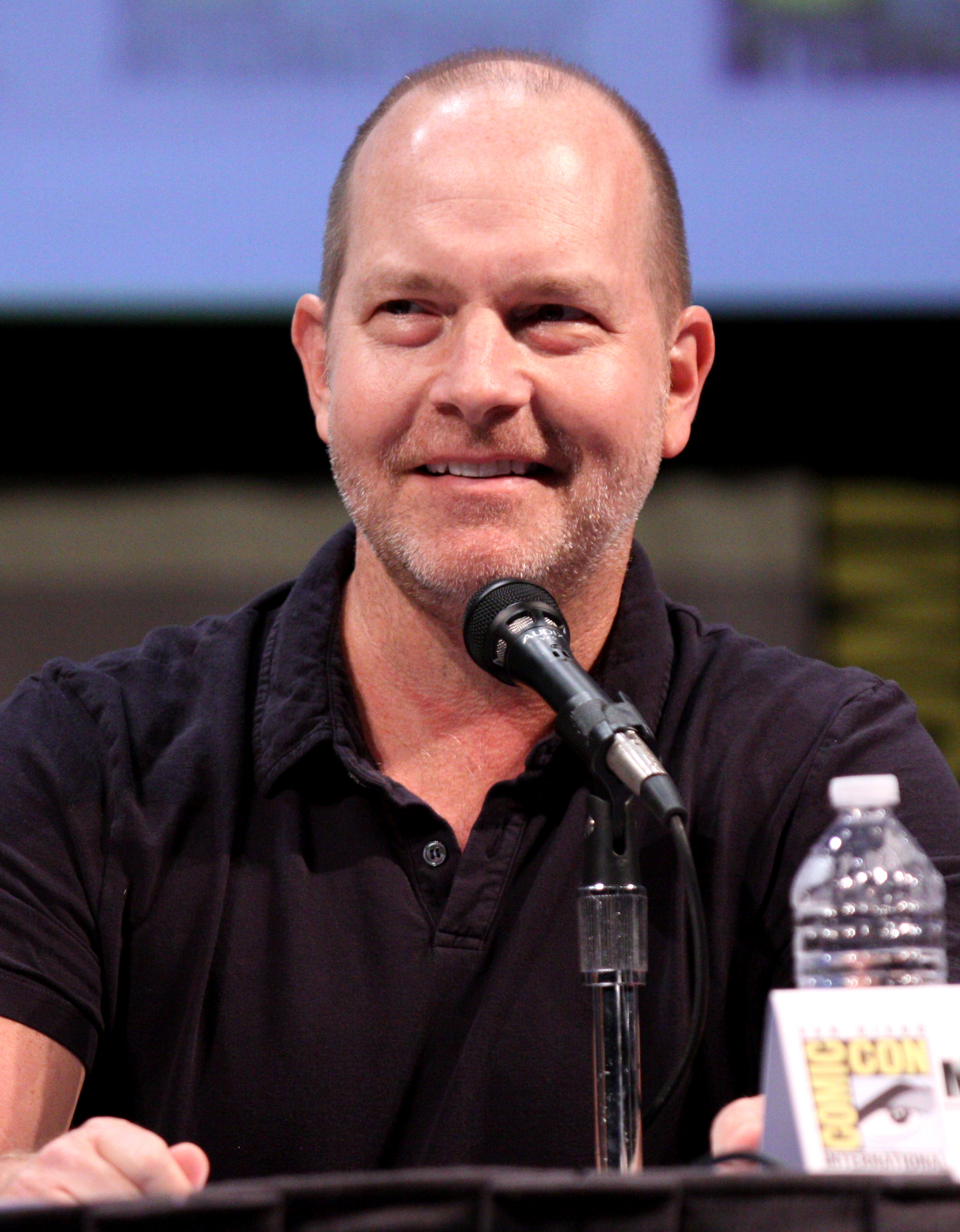
Mike Henry

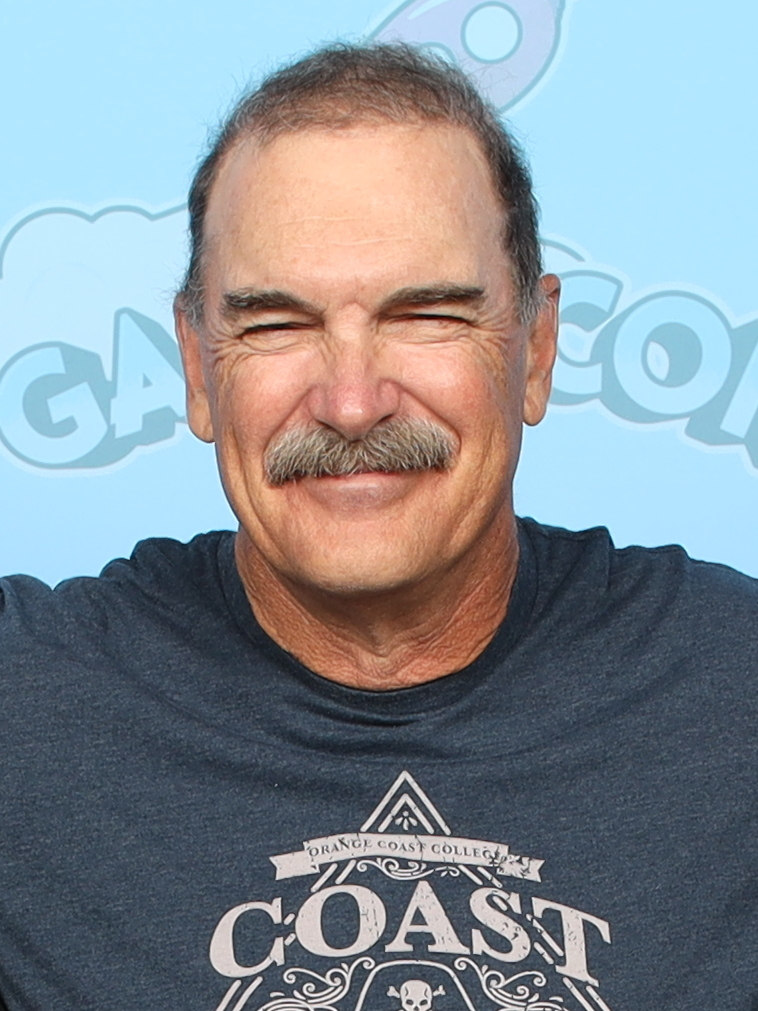
Patrick Warburton

Seth MacFarlane voices three of the show's main characters: Peter Griffin, Brian Griffin, and Stewie Griffin. Since MacFarlane had a strong vision for these characters, he chose to voice them himself, believing it would be easier than for someone else to attempt it. MacFarlane drew inspiration for the voice of Peter from a security guard he overheard talking while attending the Rhode Island School of Design. Stewie's voice was based on the voice of English actor Rex Harrison, especially his performance in the 1964 musical drama film My Fair Lady. MacFarlane uses his regular speaking voice when playing Brian. MacFarlane also provides the voices for various other recurring and one-time-only characters, most prominently those of the Griffins' neighbor Glenn Quagmire, news anchor Tom Tucker, and Lois' father, Carter Pewterschmidt.

Alex Borstein voices Peter's wife Lois Griffin, Asian correspondent Tricia Takanawa, Loretta Brown, and Lois' mother, Babs Pewterschmidt. Borstein was asked to provide a voice for the pilot while she was working on MADtv. She had not met MacFarlane or seen any of his artwork and said it was "really sight unseen". At the time, Borstein was performing in a stage show in Los Angeles. She played a redheaded mother whose voice she had based on one of her cousins.

Seth Green primarily voices Chris Griffin and Neil Goldman. Green stated that he did an impression of the character Buffalo Bill from the thriller film The Silence of the Lambs during his audition.

Mila Kunis and Lacey Chabert have both voiced Meg Griffin. Chabert left the series after the first season because of time conflicts with schoolwork (at the time) and her role on Party of Five. When Kunis auditioned for the role, she was called back by MacFarlane, who instructed her to speak slower. He then told her to come back another time and enunciate more. Once she claimed that she had it under control, MacFarlane hired her.

Mike Henry voices Herbert, Bruce the Performance Artist, Consuela, the Greased-up Deaf Guy, and until 2021, Cleveland Brown. Henry met MacFarlane at the Rhode Island School of Design and kept in touch with him after they graduated. A few years later, MacFarlane contacted him about being part of the show; he agreed and came on as a writer and voice actor. During the show's first four seasons, he was credited as a guest star, but beginning with season five's "Prick Up Your Ears", he has been credited as a main cast member. On June 26, 2020, after twenty years of voicing the character, Mike Henry announced on Twitter that he was stepping down from voicing Cleveland, stating "persons of color should play characters of color." On September 25, 2020, it was announced that Arif Zahir would take over as the voice of Cleveland.

Other recurring cast members include Patrick Warburton as Joe Swanson, Jennifer Tilly as Bonnie Swanson, John G. Brennan as Mort Goldman and Horace the bartender, Carlos Alazraqui as Jonathan Weed, Adam Carolla and Norm Macdonald as Death, Lori Alan as Diane Simmons, Phil LaMarr as Ollie Williams and Judge Dignified Q. Blackman, and Kevin Michael Richardson as Jerome. Fellow cartoonist Butch Hartman has made guest voice appearances in episodes as various characters. Also, writer Danny Smith voices various recurring characters, such as Ernie the Giant Chicken. Alexandra Breckenridge also appears as many various characters. Adam West appeared as the eponymous Mayor Adam West, until his death in 2017.

Episodes often feature guest voices from a wide range of professions, including actors, athletes, authors, bands, musicians, and scientists. Many guest voices star as themselves. Leslie Uggams was the first to appear as herself, in the fourth episode of the first season, "Mind Over Murder". The episode "Not All Dogs Go to Heaven" guest starred the entire cast of Star Trek: The Next Generation, including Patrick Stewart, Jonathan Frakes, Brent Spiner, LeVar Burton, Gates McFadden, Michael Dorn, Wil Wheaton, Marina Sirtis, and even Denise Crosby (season 1 as Tasha Yar), playing themselves; this is the episode with the most guest stars of the seventh season.

=== Early history and cancellation ===
Family Guy officially premiered after Fox's broadcast of Super Bowl XXXIII on January 31, 1999, with "Death Has a Shadow". The show debuted to 22 million viewers and immediately generated controversy regarding its adult content. The show returned on April 11, 1999, with "I Never Met the Dead Man". Family Guy garnered decent ratings in Fox's 8:30 pm slot on Sunday, scheduled between The Simpsons and The X-Files. At the end of its first season, the show ranked No. 33 in the Nielsen ratings, with 12.8 million households tuning in. The show launched its second season in a new time slot, Thursday at 9 pm, on September 23, 1999. Family Guy was pitted against NBC's Frasier, and the series' ratings declined sharply. Subsequently, Fox removed Family Guy from its schedule and began airing episodes irregularly. The show returned on March 7, 2000, at 8:30 pm on Tuesdays, where it was constantly beaten in the ratings by ABC's then-new breakout hit Who Wants to Be a Millionaire, coming in at No. 114 in the Nielsen ratings with 6.3 million households tuning in. Fox announced that the show had been canceled in May 2000, at the end of the second season. However, following a last-minute reprieve, on July 24, 2000, Fox ordered 13 additional episodes to form a third season.

The show returned on November 8, 2001, once again in a tough time slot: Thursday nights at 8 pm. This slot brought it into competition with Survivor and Friends (a situation later referenced in Stewie Griffin: The Untold Story). During its second and third seasons, Fox frequently moved the show around to different days and time slots with little or no notice and, consequently, the show's ratings suffered. Upon Fox's annual unveiling of its 2002 fall line-up on May 15, 2002, Family Guy was absent. Fox announced that the show had been officially canceled shortly thereafter.

=== Cult success and revival ===
Fox attempted to sell the rights for reruns of the show, but finding networks that were interested was difficult; Cartoon Network eventually bought the rights "basically for free", according to the president of 20th Century Fox Television. Family Guy premiered in reruns on Adult Swim on April 20, 2003, and immediately became the block's top-rated program, dominating late-night viewing in its time period versus cable and broadcast competition and boosting viewership by 239%. The complete first and second seasons were released on DVD the same week the show premiered on Adult Swim, and the show became a cult phenomenon, selling 400,000 copies within one month. Sales of the DVD set reached 2.2 million copies, becoming the best-selling television DVD of 2003 and the second-highest-selling television DVD ever, behind the first season of Comedy Central's Chappelle's Show. The third-season DVD release also sold more than a million copies. The show's popularity in DVD sales and reruns rekindled Fox's interest, and, on May 20, 2004, Fox ordered 35 new episodes of Family Guy, marking the first revival of a television show based on DVD sales.

"North by North Quahog", which premiered May 1, 2005, was the first episode to be broadcast after the show's hiatus. It was written by MacFarlane and directed by Peter Shin. MacFarlane believed the show's three-year hiatus was beneficial, because animated shows do not normally have hiatuses, and towards the end of their seasons, "... you see a lot more sex jokes and bodily function jokes and signs of a fatigued staff that their brains are just fried". With "North by North Quahog", the writing staff tried to keep the show "[...] exactly as it was" before its cancellation, and "None of us had any desire to make it look any slicker". The episode was watched by 11.85 million viewers, the show's highest ratings since the airing of the first season episode "Brian: Portrait of a Dog".

=== Lawsuits ===
In March 2007, comedian Carol Burnett filed a $6 million lawsuit against 20th Century Fox, claiming that her charwoman cartoon character had been portrayed on the show without her permission. She stated it was a trademark infringement and that Fox violated her publicity rights. On June 4, 2007, United States District Judge Dean D. Pregerson rejected the lawsuit, stating that the parody was protected under the First Amendment, citing Hustler Magazine v. Falwell as a precedent.

On October 3, 2007, Bourne Co. Music Publishers filed a lawsuit accusing the show of infringing its copyright on the song "When You Wish Upon a Star", through a parody song titled "I Need a Jew" appearing in the episode "When You Wish Upon a Weinstein". Bourne Co., the sole United States copyright owner of the song, alleged the parody pairs a "thinly veiled" copy of its music with antisemitic lyrics. Named in the suit were 20th Century Fox Film Corp., Fox Broadcasting Co., Cartoon Network, MacFarlane, and Murphy; the suit sought to stop the program's distribution and asked for unspecified damages. Bourne argued that "I Need a Jew" uses the copyrighted melody of "When You Wish Upon a Star" without commenting on that song, and that it was therefore not a First Amendment-protected parody per the ruling in Campbell v. Acuff-Rose Music, Inc. On March 16, 2009, United States District Judge Deborah Batts held that Family Guy did not infringe on Bourne's copyright when it transformed the song for comical use in an episode.

In December 2007, Family Guy was again accused of copyright infringement when actor Art Metrano filed a lawsuit regarding a scene in Stewie Griffin: The Untold Story, in which Jesus performs Metrano's signature "magic" act involving absurd "faux" magical hand gestures while humming the distinctive tune "Fine and Dandy". 20th Century Fox, MacFarlane, Callaghan and Borstein were all named in the suit. In July 2009, a federal district court judge rejected Fox's motion to dismiss, saying that the first three fair use factors involved – "purpose and character of the use", "nature of the infringed work" and "amount and substantiality of the taking" – counted in Metrano's favor, while the fourth – "economic impact" – had to await more fact-finding. In denying the dismissal, the court held that the reference in the scene made light of Jesus and his followers – not Metrano or his act. The case was settled out of court in 2010 with undisclosed terms.

== Hallmarks ==
=== Humor ===
Family Guy uses the film-making technique of cutaways, which occur in the majority of Family Guy episodes.

Early episodes based much of their comedy on Stewie's "super villain" antics, such as his constant plans for total world domination, his evil experiments, plans and inventions to get rid of things he dislikes, and his constant attempts at matricide. As the series progressed, the writers and MacFarlane agreed that his personality and the jokes were starting to feel dated, so they began writing him with a different personality. Family Guy often includes self-referential humor. The most common form is jokes about the Fox network, and occasions where the characters break the fourth wall by addressing the audience. For example, in "North by North Quahog", the first episode that aired after the show's revival, included Peter telling the family that they had been canceled because Fox had to make room in their schedule for shows like Dark Angel, Titus, Undeclared, Action, That '80s Show, Wonderfalls, Fastlane, Andy Richter Controls the Universe, Skin, Girls Club, Cracking Up, The Pitts, Firefly, Get Real, FreakyLinks, Wanda at Large, Costello, The Lone Gunmen, A Minute with Stan Hooper, Normal, Ohio, Pasadena, Harsh Realm, Keen Eddie, The Street, The American Embassy, Cedric the Entertainer Presents, The Tick, Luis, and Greg the Bunny. Lois asks whether there is any hope, to which Peter replies that if all these shows are canceled they might have a chance; the shows were indeed canceled during Family Guy's hiatus.

The show uses catchphrases, and most of the primary and secondary characters have them. Notable expressions include Quagmire's "Giggity goo", Peter's "Freakin' sweet", Cleveland's "Oh, that's nasty", and Joe's "Bring it on!"

=== "Road to" episodes ===
The "Road to" episodes are a series of hallmark travel episodes. They are a parody of the seven Road to ... comedy films starring Bing Crosby and Bob Hope. These episodes have always involved Stewie and Brian in some foreign, supernatural or science-fiction location, unrelated to the show's normal location in Quahog. The first, titled "Road to Rhode Island", aired on May 30, 2000, during the second season. The episodes are known for featuring elaborate musical numbers, similar to the Road films. The episodes contain several trademarks, including a special version of the opening sequence, custom musical cues and musical numbers, and parodies of science fiction and fantasy films.

The original idea for the "Road to" episodes came from MacFarlane, as he is a fan of the films of Crosby, Hope, and Dorothy Lamour. The first episode was directed by Dan Povenmire, who would direct the "Road to" episodes until the episode "Road to Rupert", at which point he had left the show to create Phineas and Ferb with Jeff "Swampy" Marsh. Series regular Greg Colton then took over Povenmire's role as director of the "Road to" episodes.

The "Road to" episodes are generally considered by critics and fans to be some of the greatest in the series, thanks to the developing relationship between Stewie and Brian and the strong plotlines of the episodes themselves.

== Reception and legacy ==
In 2016, a New York Times study of the 50 TV shows with the most Facebook Likes found that, like other satirical comedies, Family Guy is most popular in cities. The show's popularity was more correlated with support for Hillary Clinton than any other show". As of 2008, the franchise has generated $1 billion in total revenue, including $400 million from TV syndication, $400 million from DVD sales, and $200 million from merchandise sales.

=== Ratings ===
Season	Episodes	Time slot (ET)	Season premiere		Season finale		TV season	Overall ratings	
Season	Episodes	Time slot (ET)	Date	Viewers (in millions)	Date	Viewers (in millions)	TV season	Rank	Viewers (in millions)
1	7	Sunday 10:30 pm (Episode 1); Sunday 8:30 pm (Episodes 2–7)	January 31, 1999	22.00	May 16, 1999	13.10	1998–99	33	14.12
2	21	Thursday 9:00 pm (Episodes 1–2) (Note: While the season initially started on Thursday nights, Fox would end up airing episodes irregularly due to declining ratings. All airtimes can be found on TV Tango Archived November 16, 2019, at the Wayback Machine); Sunday 8:30 pm (Episode 3); Tuesday 8:30 pm (Episodes 4–7, 9–12); Tuesday 9:30 pm (Episode 8); Tuesday 9:00 pm (Episodes 13, 15, 17, 19–21); Tuesday 8:00 pm (Episodes 14, 16); Wednesday 8:30 pm (Episode 18)	September 23, 1999	7.72	August 1, 2000	6.15	1999–2000	114	6.74
3	22	Wednesday 9:30 pm (Episodes 1–10) (Note: While the season initially started on Wednesday nights, Fox would end up airing episodes irregularly due to declining ratings. All airtimes can be found on TV Tango Archived November 16, 2019, at the Wayback Machine.); Thursday 8:00 pm (Episodes 11–12, 14–15, 17–21); Thursday 8:30 pm (Episode 13); Friday 8:00 pm (Episode 16); Sunday 11:00 pm (Episode 22) (Note: The episode first aired slightly altered on Adult Swim, before officially airing the following year on Fox on Friday at 9:30 PM)	July 11, 2001	5.99	February 14, 2002 (Fox); November 9, 2003 (Adult Swim) / December 10, 2004 (Fox)	4.63; 4.88 (Note: The former ratings count for the original Season 3 finale Family Guy Viewer Mail#1, while the latter ratings count for when When You Wish Upon a Weinstein premiered on Fox over two years later.)	2001–02	125	4.40
4	30	Sunday 9:00 pm	May 1, 2005	11.85	May 21, 2006	8.14	2005–06	68	7.90
5	18	Sunday 9:00 pm	September 10, 2006	9.93	May 20, 2007	9.15	2006–07	71	8.69
6	12	Sunday 9:00 pm	September 23, 2007	10.81	May 4, 2008	7.69	2007–08	84	7.94
7	16	Sunday 9:00 pm	September 28, 2008	9.09	May 17, 2009	7.35	2008–09	69	7.56
8	21	Sunday 9:00 pm (Episodes 1–3, 5–20); Sunday 8:00 pm (Episode 4)	September 27, 2009	10.11	June 20, 2010	6.31	2009–10	53	7.73
9	18	Sunday 9:00 pm (Episodes 1–6, 8–20); Sunday 8:30 pm (Episode 7)	September 26, 2010	9.13	May 22, 2011	5.84	2010–11	56	7.66
10	23	Sunday 9:00 pm	September 25, 2011	7.69	May 20, 2012	5.35	2011–12	63	7.30
11	22	Sunday 9:00 pm	September 30, 2012	6.55	May 19, 2013	5.16	2012–13	62	6.94
12	21	Sunday 9:00 pm (Episodes 1–4, 6–11); Sunday 9:30 pm (Episode 5); Sunday 8:30 pm (Episodes 12–21)	September 29, 2013	5.20	May 18, 2014	3.85	2013–14	78	6.11
13	18	Sunday 9:00 pm (Episodes 1–13, 15–18); Sunday 8:30 pm (Episode 14)	September 28, 2014	8.45	May 17, 2015	2.85	2014–15	94	5.86
14	20	Sunday 9:00 pm	September 27, 2015	2.87	May 22, 2016	2.59	2015–16	111	4.28
15	20	Sunday 9:00 pm (Episodes 1–10, 12–19); Sunday 9:30 pm (Episodes 11, 20)	September 25, 2016	2.80	May 21, 2017	2.14	2016–17	116	3.93
16	20	Sunday 9:00 pm (Episodes 1–8, 10–20); Sunday 9:30 pm (Episode 9)	October 1, 2017	2.80	May 20, 2018	1.83	2017–18	136	3.52
17	20	Sunday 9:00 pm	September 30, 2018	2.57	May 12, 2019	1.78	2018–19	131	3.33
18	20	Sunday 9:30 pm (Episodes 1–9, 11–20); Sunday 8:30 pm (Episode 10)	September 29, 2019	1.88	May 17, 2020	1.51	2019–20	107	2.65
19	20	Sunday 9:30 pm	September 27, 2020	1.86	May 16, 2021	1.16	2020–21	120	2.19
20	20	Sunday 9:30 pm	September 26, 2021	1.56	May 22, 2022	1.13	2021–22	111	1.9
21	20	Sunday 9:30 pm (Episodes 1–15, 17–19); Sunday 9:00 pm (Episodes 16, 20)	September 25, 2022	1.57	May 7, 2023	0.76	2022–23	104	1.65
22	15	Sunday 9:30 pm (Episodes 1–9); Wednesday 9:30 pm (Episodes 10–15)	October 1, 2023	1.06	April 17, 2024	0.79	2023–24	115	1.44
23	20	Sunday 8:00 pm (Episodes 2–6); Sunday 8:30 pm (Episodes 7–13); Thursday 9:00 pm (Episodes 14–20)	October 14, 2024 (Hulu); February 16, 2025 (Fox)	1.44	July 17, 2025	0.51	2024–25	—N/a	—N/a
24	15	Sunday 8:00 pm (Episodes 2, 4, 6, 8, 10, 12, 14, 15); Sunday 9:30 pm (Episodes 1, 3, 5, 7, 9, 11, 13)	October 6, 2025 (Hulu); February 15, 2026 (Fox)	0.89	May 17, 2026	0.75	2025–26	—N/a	—N/a

Family Guy experienced a significant increase in viewership following its availability on various streaming platforms, with a particularly notable rise in popularity on Hulu. In 2018, it ranked among the most-watched TV series on the streaming service Sling TV. In 2020, Hulu announced that Family Guy was one of the top five most-watched non-sports and non-news related live shows on the streaming service.

Nielsen Media Research, which records streaming viewership on certain American television screens, reported that Family Guy was the third most-streamed series of 2024, with 42.44 billion minutes of watch time. In 2025, the series ranked seventh, with 33.37 billion minutes viewed. In December 2025, Disney announced that it was among the series to surpass one billion hours streamed on Disney+ in 2025. During the first half of 2026, Family Guy recorded 15.96 billion minutes of watch time, ranking fifth among the most-streamed acquired series and eighth overall, according to Nielsen Media Research. The series accumulated 65.4 billion minutes of viewing across linear television and streaming platforms between September 22, 2025, and September 20, 2026, ranking as the third most-watched animated series during that period.

=== Critical reception ===
Family Guy has received generally positive reviews. Catherine Seipp of National Review Online described it as a "nasty but extremely funny" cartoon. Caryn James of The New York Times called it a show with an "outrageously satirical family" that "includes plenty of comic possibilities and parodies". The Sydney Morning Herald named Family Guy the "Show of the Week" on April 21, 2009, hailing it a "pop culture-heavy masterpiece". Frazier Moore from The Seattle Times called it an "endless craving for humor about bodily emissions". He thought it was "breathtakingly smart" and said a "blend of the ingenious with the raw helps account for its much broader appeal". He summarized it as "rude, crude and deliciously wrong". The New Yorker's Nancy Franklin said that Family Guy is becoming one of the best animated shows; she commented on its ribaldry and popularity. The show has become a hit on Hulu; it is the second-highest viewed show after Saturday Night Live. IGN called Family Guy a great show and commented that it has gotten better since its revival. They stated that they cannot imagine another half-hour sitcom that provides as many laughs as Family Guy. Empire praised the show and its writers for creating hilarious moments with unlikely material. They commented that one of the reasons they love the show is because nothing is sacred—it makes jokes and gags of almost everything. Robin Pierson of The TV Critic praised the series as "a different kind of animated comedy which clearly sets out to do jokes which other cartoons can't do". Family Guy has proven popular in the United Kingdom, regularly obtaining between 700,000 and 1 million viewers for re-runs on BBC Three.

The series has attracted many celebrities. Robert Downey Jr. telephoned the show production staff and asked if he could produce or assist in an episode's creation, as his son is a fan of the show; the producers subsequently created a character for Downey. Lauren Conrad met MacFarlane while recording a Laguna Beach clip for the episode "Prick Up Your Ears" (season 5, 2006). She has watched Family Guy for years and considers Stewie her favorite character. Commenting on his appearance in the episode "Big Man on Hippocampus" (season 8, 2010), actor Dwayne Johnson stated that he was a "big fan" of Family Guy. Johnson befriended MacFarlane after he had a minor role in Johnson's 2010 film Tooth Fairy. R&B singer Rihanna has admitted to being a fan of Family Guy, as has pop singer Britney Spears; she tries to imitate Stewie's English accent. Spears, who was mocked for her personal problems in the South Park episode "Britney's New Look" in 2008, offered to appear in a cameo to hit back at the similar animated show, but MacFarlane declined, stating that he did not want to start a feud with the series.

=== Awards ===
Family Guy and its cast have been nominated for 27 Emmy Awards, with 8 wins. MacFarlane won the Outstanding Voice-Over Performance award for his performance as Stewie; Murphy and MacFarlane won the Outstanding Music and Lyrics award for the song "You Got a Lot to See" from the episode "Brian Wallows and Peter's Swallows"; Steven Fonti won the Outstanding Individual Achievement in Animation award for his storyboard work in the episode "No Chris Left Behind"; and Greg Colton won the Outstanding Individual Achievement in Animation award for his storyboard work in the episode "Road to the Multiverse". The show was nominated for eleven Annie Awards, and won three times, twice in 2006 and once in 2008. In 2009, it was nominated for an Emmy for Outstanding Comedy Series, becoming the first animated program to be nominated in this category since The Flintstones in 1961. The Simpsons was almost nominated in 1993, but voters were hesitant to pit cartoons against live action programs. The show was nominated for a Grammy in 2011. Family Guy has been nominated and has won various other awards, including the Teen Choice Awards and the People's Choice Awards. In the 1,000th issue of Entertainment Weekly, Brian Griffin was selected as the dog for "The Perfect TV Family". Wizard Magazine rated Stewie the 95th-greatest villain of all time. British newspaper The Times rated Family Guy the 45th-best American show in 2009. IGN ranked Family Guy number seven in the "Top 100 Animated Series" and number six in the "Top 25 Primetime Animated Series of All Time". Empire named it the twelfth-greatest TV show of all time in 2008. In 2005, viewers of the UK television channel Channel 4 voted Family Guy number 5 on their list of the 100 Greatest Cartoons. Brian was awarded the 2009 Stoner of the Year award by High Times for the episode "420", marking the first time an animated character received the honor. In 2004 and 2007, TV Guide ranked Family Guy number 12 and number 15 in their list of top cult shows ever. Family Guy has garnered six Golden Reel Awards nominations, winning three. In 2013, TV Guide ranked Family Guy the ninth Greatest TV Cartoon of All Time.

=== Criticism and controversy ===
One of the initial critics to give the show negative reviews was Ken Tucker from Entertainment Weekly; he called it "The Simpsons as conceived by a singularly sophomoric mind that lacks any reference point beyond other TV shows". The Parents Television Council (PTC), a conservative non-profit watchdog, has attacked the series since its premiere and has branded various episodes as "Worst TV Show of the Week". In May 2000, the PTC launched a letter-writing campaign to the Fox network in an effort to persuade the network to cancel the show. The PTC has placed the show on their annual lists of "Worst Prime-Time Shows for Family Viewing" in 2000, 2005, and 2006. The Federal Communications Commission (FCC) has received multiple petitions requesting that the show be blocked from broadcasting on indecency grounds. Tucker and the PTC have both accused the show of portraying religion negatively, and of being racist. Because of the PTC, some advertisers have canceled their contracts after reviewing the content of the episodes, claiming it to be unsuitable. Critics have compared the show's humor and characters with those of The Simpsons.

Various episodes of the show have generated controversy. In "420" (season seven, 2009), Brian decides to start a campaign to legalize cannabis in Quahog; the Venezuelan government reacted negatively to the episode and banned Family Guy from airing on their local networks, which generally syndicate American programming. Venezuelan justice minister Tareck El Aissami, citing the promotion of the use of cannabis, stated that any cable stations that did not stop airing the series would be fined; the government showed a clip which featured Brian and Stewie singing the praises of marijuana as a demonstration of how the United States supports cannabis use. In "Extra Large Medium" (season eight, 2010) a character named Ellen (who has Down syndrome) states that her mother is the former governor of Alaska, which strongly implies that her mother is Sarah Palin, the only woman to have served in the office of governor in the state. Palin, the mother of a child with Down syndrome, criticized the episode in an appearance on The O'Reilly Factor, calling those who made the show "cruel, cold-hearted people".

== Broadcast and streaming ==
In the United States, the show currently airs on Adult Swim, Comedy Central, and FXX. The show was first syndicated to Adult Swim and TBS from 2003 to 2021, sharing the rights to the first fifteen seasons. It was syndicated to various local stations from 2007 to 2024. In April 2019, FX Networks began airing reruns of season 16 on FXX, with season 17 debuting that October, and shared off-network rights to both seasons with sister channel Freeform. After Adult Swim and TBS' rights expired on September 18, 2021, FXX and Freeform began airing the first fifteen seasons. The show also joined FX's lineup that same month.

The show's departure from Adult Swim on September 18, 2021, was commemorated with a remembrance bumper created by the network, which played after the final airing (the episode "Stewie is Enceinte"). The bumper showed animations of several Adult Swim characters bidding farewell to Family Guy, including shots of Peter crying at the beginning and the Griffin family waving goodbye towards the end.

Comedy Central began airing the show on September 2, 2024, as part of a non-exclusive licensing deal between Paramount and Disney. Comedy Central debuted the show with an all-day marathon on Labor Day. A similar licensing deal was then struck with Warner Bros. Discovery Networks for the show to return to Adult Swim starting January 1, 2025, with the network planning a 3-day marathon to celebrate.

In the United States, the series is available for streaming exclusively on Hulu. Additionally, Hulu launched two holiday specials of Family Guy in late 2024, marking the first time a new episode of the show airs on a streaming platform; Internationally, Family Guy is available to stream on Star on Disney+. The first such special premiered on October 14, 2024. The second special would then air on November 25, 2024. The show's second Halloween special for Hulu would air on October 6, 2025. The United States is the only country where the show is not available on either Disney+ or Star+.

Initially, Family Guy was not available to stream on Disney+ in Latin America, as it had been available on the standalone service Star+, however, Star+ content merged with Disney+ content on June 26, 2024, and Star+ was discontinued altogether on July 24, 2024.

Family Guy premiered in Australia on April 9, 1999, on the Seven Network, in 2000 on Fox8, and on 7mate on September 27, 2010. Initially, only 2 seasons were available to stream on Disney+ Star due to pre-existing contracts. The other 17 seasons were added on December 1, 2021, after the contract expired.

In Canada, the series premiered January 31, 1999, on Global and September 1, 2003, on Teletoon at Night. Beginning in the 2015–2016 season, the show moved to Citytv; the show would once again return to the channel in 2023. Starting in November 2021, the series moved to Disney+. In addition to Teletoon at Night, the show has been syndicated to TVtropolis (now DTour). As of January 2025, Adult Swim Canada and FXX Canada syndicate the series. Since 2024, CHCH and Citytv share the broadcast rights to the series due to scheduling issues with new episodes streaming the next day on Disney+.

The show airs in India on Star World Premiere, in Ireland on 3e, and in New Zealand on TVNZ Duke; previously it screened on defunct channel Four.

In the United Kingdom, Family Guy premiered in September 1999, originally on Channel 4 and Sky One. In January 2005, Fox UK (then known as FX) began broadcasting the show. From October 2005, BBC Two started screening Family Guy before the show moved to BBC Three in September 2006. Beginning with season 14, the show moved to ITV2, premiering on February 29, 2016, while the BBC would continue to hold the rights for past seasons until 2017.

== Franchise ==
=== Books ===
A comic book based on the Family Guy universe was published by Titan Comics, edited by Steve White, and illustrated by Anthony Williams and S. L. Gallant. The writing and the illustrations were supervised by the show's producers. The first comic book was released on July 27, 2011.

Family Guy: It Takes a Village Idiot, and I Married One was written by executive story editor Cherry Chevapravatdumrong and actress Alex Borstein. The book was first published on May 8, 2007. The book is a biographical monologue by Lois Griffin covering a portion of her life, spanning from her memories of growing up to her attempted run for mayor in the town of Quahog. Though the book primarily consists of a loose narrative monologue by Lois, it is also interspersed with sections from other characters such as Peter Griffin. The book covers events featured in the Family Guy episode "It Takes a Village Idiot, and I Married One", with which it shares a title. It was published in the United Kingdom in 2007 by Orion Books.

Peter Griffin's Guide to the Holidays
- Front cover
- Author: Danny Smith
- Language: English
- Subject: Family Guy
- Genre: Humor
- Publisher: HarperCollins
- Publication date: 2007
- Publication place: United States
- Media type: Novel
- Pages: 151
- ISBN: 978-1-4091-0046-1

Peter Griffin's Guide to the Holidays is an American humor book about Family Guy written by executive producer Danny Smith. The book was first published on 23 October 2007. The book consists of a monologue by Peter Griffin discussing his various memories of Christmas and other subjects related to the holiday. Though the book primarily consists of a loose narrative monologue related to Christmas, it is also interspersed with sections from other cast members such as Quagmire. It was published in the United Kingdom in 2008 by Orion Books.

==== Book description ====
From the Griffin house to yours—a one-of-a-kind guide to enjoying the most wonderful freakin' time of the year!

Peter Griffin is a central character in Family Guy. Christmas episodes of the series often feature Peter and his family in stories centered on the holiday and family activities. From Peter's childhood Christmas recollections (he never let a burned cookie go to waste) to a tour of Quahog at Christmastime (warning: don't look in Quagmire's stocking), to the Griffin family's most sacred holiday traditions, this book has something for everyone on your holiday list, regardless of whether they've been naughty or nice.

Family Guy: Stewie's Guide to World Domination
- Family Guy: Stewie's Guide to World Domination book cover.
- Author: Steve Callaghan (Credited as Stewie Griffin)
- Language: English
- Subject: Family Guy
- Genre: Humor
- Publisher: HarperCollins
- Publication date: 20 October 2005
- Publication place: United States
- Media type: Novel
- Pages: 112
- ISBN: 978-0-06-077321-2

Family Guy: Stewie's Guide to World Domination is an American humor book about Family Guy written by producer Steve Callaghan. The book was first published on 20 October 2005. The plot follows Stewie Griffin's plans on ruling the world, despite his only being a minor.

==== Plot ====
Since his birth to Lois and Peter Griffin, Stewie has shown his intentions of world domination, to the extent of storing machine guns and other weapons in his bedroom for usage at whim. Upon deciding people must understand his plans before he can perform them, he discusses his dysfunctional family and modern day society throughout, as well as explaining how he intends to take over the world, as well as his personal beliefs on matters such as his family, love, parenting, work, preschool, pop culture, politics, play and more.

==== Reception ====
HarperCollins commented that "this book is for the insufferable child in us all, eager to buck the ways of the old guard or just eager for a laugh". When asked in an interview by HarperCollins why he wrote the book, Callaghan comments: "Well, as I tell my minions, true domination can only result from bearing this single truth in mind: the key to being able to dominate the world is understanding the world around you".

=== Live performances ===
As promotion for the show and as Newman described "[to] expand interest in the show beyond its diehard fans", Fox organized four Family Guy Live! performances, which featured cast members reading old episodes aloud. The cast also performed musical numbers from the Family Guy: Live in Vegas comedy album. The stage shows were an extension of a performance by the cast during the 2004 Montreal Comedy Festival. The Family Guy Live! performances, which took place in Los Angeles and New York, sold out and were attended by around 1,200 people each.

In 2009, a special televised performance show aired, titled Family Guy Presents Seth & Alex's Almost Live Comedy Show, in which voice actors Alex Borstein and MacFarlane performed songs from the show, as well as a parody of Lady Gaga's song "Poker Face" in the voice of Marlee Matlin, who appeared on stage as a guest during the performance. Some new animated gags also appeared in the show.

=== Film ===
In a July 22, 2007, interview with The Hollywood Reporter, MacFarlane announced that he may start working on a feature film, although "nothing's official". In TV Week on July 18, 2008, MacFarlane confirmed plans to produce a theatrically released Family Guy feature film sometime "within the next year". He came up with an idea for the story, "something that you could not do on the show, which [to him] is the only reason to do a movie." He later went on to say he imagines the film to be "an old-style musical with dialogue" similar to The Sound of Music, saying that he would "really be trying to capture, musically, that feel". On October 13, 2011, MacFarlane confirmed that a deal for a Family Guy film had been made, and that it would be written by him and series co-producer Ricky Blitt.

On November 30, 2012, MacFarlane confirmed plans to produce a Family Guy film. The project was put on hold while MacFarlane worked on Ted 2.

On August 10, 2018, Fox announced that a live-action/animated film based on the series was in development.

In July 2019, MacFarlane confirmed that there would be a Family Guy film.

During PaleyFest in April 2024, MacFarlane revealed that he has known what the plot of the film would be for the past 15 years, but had not had the time to write it.

=== Spin-offs ===
MacFarlane co-created—alongside Mike Henry and Richard Appel—the Family Guy spin-off The Cleveland Show, which premiered September 27, 2009. They began discussing the project in 2007.

On March 12, 2026, it was announced that a second spin-off series, Stewie, was given a two-season order for Fox. The new animated comedy is reported to follow Stewie Griffin in preschool and will explore time and space travel. Unlike Cleveland Brown, who was not seen on Family Guy while appearing on The Cleveland Show, Stewie Griffin will remain on Family Guy and will be seen on both shows. The spin-off is set to premiere during the 2027–28 television season.

=== Video games ===
The Family Guy Video Game! is a 2006 action game released by 2K Games and developed by High Voltage Software.

Family Guy: Back to the Multiverse, a sequel to the episode "Road to the Multiverse", was released on November 20, 2012.

Family Guy: The Quest for Stuff launched on iOS and Android on April 10, 2014.

Animation Throwdown: The Quest For Cards, a card game with content and characters from five animated television shows from Fox – Family Guy, Futurama, American Dad!, Bob's Burgers and King of the Hill – was released in 2016 by Kongregate.

Family Guy: Another Freakin' Mobile Game was released on iOS on April 25, 2017.

Warped Kart Racers is a racing game that was released on Apple Arcade in May 2022. The game features the entire Griffin family, and includes characters from American Dad!, King of the Hill and Solar Opposites.

=== Merchandise ===
As of 2009, six books have been released about the Family Guy universe, all published by HarperCollins since 2005. The first, Family Guy: Stewie's Guide to World Domination (ISBN 978-0-06-077321-2) by Steve Callahan, was released on April 26, 2005. Written in the style of a graphic novel, the plot follows Stewie's plans to rule the world. Other books include Family Guy: It Takes a Village Idiot, and I Married One (ISBN 978-0-7528-7593-4), which covers the events of the episode of the same name; and Family Guy and Philosophy: A Cure for the Petarded (ISBN 978-1-4051-6316-3), a collection of 17 essays exploring the connections between the series and historical philosophers. A book written from Brian's point of view (written by Andrew Goldberg) was published in 2006, called Brian Griffin's Guide to Booze, Broads and the Lost Art of Being a Man.

Family Guy has been commercially successful in the home market. The show was the first to be resurrected because of high DVD sales. The first volume, covering the show's first two seasons, sold 1.67 million units, topping TV DVD sales in 2003, while the second volume sold another million units. Volumes six and seven debuted at fifth place in United States DVD sales; volume seven was the highest-selling television DVD, selling 171,000 units by June 21, 2009. Family Guy Presents Blue Harvest, the DVD featuring the Star Wars special "Blue Harvest", was released on January 15, 2008, and premiered at the top of United States DVD sales. The DVD was the first Family Guy DVD to include a digital copy for download to the iPod. In 2004, the first series of Family Guy toy figurines was released by Mezco Toyz; each member of the Griffin family had their own toy, with the exception of Stewie, of whom two different figures were made. Over the course of two years, four more series of toy figures were released, with various forms of Peter. In 2008, the character Peter appeared in advertisements for Subway Restaurants, promoting the restaurant's massive feast sandwich.

== See also ==
- Seth MacFarlane's Cavalcade of Cartoon Comedy

== Citations ==
Bibliography

- Lenburg, Jeff (2006a). Who's Who in Animated Cartoons: An International Guide to Film & Television's Award-Winning and Legendary Animators (Illustrated ed.). New York: Applause Theatre & Cinema Books. ISBN 978-1-55783-671-7.
- Callaghan, Steve (2005). Family Guy: The Official Episode Guide, Seasons 1–3. New York City: HarperCollins. ISBN 978-0-06-083305-3.
