= Family Guy season 24 =

Season of television series

Family Guy
- Season 24
- Promotional poster featuring the Griffin family
- Starring: Seth MacFarlane; Alex Borstein; Seth Green; Mila Kunis; Mike Henry; Patrick Warburton; Arif Zahir
- No. of episodes: 15 (Fox); 2 (Hulu); 17 (total)

Release
- Original network: Fox; Hulu (specials)
- Original release: October 6, 2025 – May 17, 2026

Season chronology
- ← Previous; Season 23 Next → Season 25

The twenty-fourth season of the American animated television series Family Guy premiered on October 6, 2025. Like the previous season, it was preceded by two holiday specials airing exclusively on Hulu, with a Halloween special premiering on October 6, 2025 and a Christmas special on November 28, 2025, while the rest of the season began airing on February 15, 2026 on Fox as part of its Animation Domination programming block. The season concluded its run on May 17, 2026.

The series follows the dysfunctional Griffin family, consisting of father Peter, mother Lois, daughter Meg, son Chris, baby Stewie, and the family dog Brian, who reside in their hometown of Quahog, Rhode Island.

Season twenty-four would start the run of the twenty-third production season, which is executive produced by Seth MacFarlane, Alec Sulkin, Richard Appel, Steve Callaghan, Danny Smith, Kara Vallow, Mark Hentemann, Tom Devanney, Patrick Meighan, and Alex Carter. Sulkin and Appel returned as the series' showrunners.

== Voice cast and characters ==
- Seth MacFarlane as Peter Griffin, Brian Griffin, Stewie Griffin, Glenn Quagmire, Carter Pewterschmidt, Tom Tucker, Dr. Hartman, Ida Davis
- Alex Borstein as Lois Griffin, Elle Hitler
- Seth Green as Chris Griffin
- Mila Kunis as Meg Griffin
- Mike Henry as Bruce, Herbert, Consuela
- Patrick Warburton as Joe Swanson
- Arif Zahir as Cleveland Brown

=== Supporting cast ===
- John G. Brennan as Mort Goldman
- Gary Cole as Principal Shepherd
- Sam Elliott as Mayor Wild West
- Sanaa Lathan as Donna Tubbs
- Rachael MacFarlane as Miss Tammy
- Kevin Michael Richardson as Jerome
- Jennifer Tilly as Bonnie Swanson

== Episodes ==
No. overall	No. in season (Note: Episodes without an episode number within the season constitute exclusive episodes commissioned and released by Hulu.)	Title	Directed by	Written by	Original release date	Prod. code	U.S. viewers (millions)
445	–	"A Little Fright Music"	Mike Kim	Danny Smith	October 6, 2025	PACX19	N/A
While standing in line for face painting at the pumpkin patch, Stewie and Brian note the lack of original Halloween songs on the radio, save for "Monster Mash" and decide to write one themselves. They initially decide on a rap before switching to a Halloween spoof of "We Didn't Start the Fire", though Stewie gets more wrapped up in living like a songwriter as opposed to getting the song done, prompting Brian to walk out on him. Meanwhile, Chris is bummed after Lois declares him too old to trick-or-treat and forces him to hand out candy at home. He and Peter sneak off to trick-or-treat outside of town while lying to Lois about being at the game. Bonnie and Donna reveal that their husbands told them the same lie, clueing Lois in on what's happening. The guys are accosted by masked killers and chased into a cabin where they're held hostage. When the guys express guilt over lying to their wives, the masked killers reveal themselves to be Lois, Donna, and Bonnie, having pranked them as payback. As they reconcile, Lois admits that her Halloween spirit was rekindled due to the act of setting up the prank. In the final scene, Stewie and Brian perform the spooky Halloween song they wrote.
446	–	"Disney's Hulu's Family Guy's Hallmark Channel's Lifetime's Familiar Holiday Movie"	Steve Robertson	Mark Hentemann	November 28, 2025	PACX20	N/A
Spoofing Hallmark Channel's Christmas movies with the intro sung by Lainey Wilson, Lois is a hardworking associate at Big Pie in Cityopolis who has no time for relationships. When her boss, Carter, is upset about coming second in annual pie rankings, he orders Lois to steal the secret recipe from Aunt Maude's Pies in the small town of Townsville. Lois agrees, knowing it could get her the CEO position, but is sidetracked after falling for the local mechanic, Peter, who also owns Aunt Maude's. The two fall in love over the course of one day despite Peter already dating Bonnie, but Peter breaks up with Lois after discovering her plan. Lois is told by Andie MacDowell that her career is not as important as she thinks and joins Townsville's Christmas pageant in Bonnie's place. She and Peter reconcile, though Lois is called back to Cityopolis to accept the CEO position after Carter is fired. She resigns soon after due to missing Peter and steps down to be with him, but ends up getting paralyzed on her way out and Peter rejects her.
447	1	"The Edible Arrangement"	John Holmquist	Travis Bowe	February 15, 2026	PACX12	0.89
At the Quahog Dispensary's grand opening, Brian splurges on weed gummies, which he stores in the pantry. At night, Stewie sneaks some of the Oreos Lois purchased earlier for Peter's good behavior, but also mistakes the gummies for candy. When he is discovered to be high by Miss Tammy, he is forced to live at the Swanson's house temporarily while Lois completes online courses to regain custody. Lois then forces a list of rules on the family to keep Stewie safe, but Stewie is fed up and gets high again, spiking Lois's wine as well so she'll lay off. While stoned, the two discover that they can fully understand each other and bond over their never-before-heard insights on their family life. Stewie even details his past history of trying to kill Lois. After having a night on the town and defecating in the Swansons' yard, the two wake up sober, but still vaguely remember the experience. However, Stewie vows to kill Lois after she once again denies him an Oreo.
448	2	"Pumpkin Spice Girls"	Joe Vaux	Polina Diaz	February 22, 2026	PACX14	1.04
While visiting Starbucks, Lois sees that the Pumpkin spice latte is back and has Meg try one, getting her hooked. Upon realizing that it's only a seasonal item, Meg convinces Lois to steal the ingredients and stockpile them at home, managing to avoid being identified at the crime scene. Bonnie discovers the truth after smelling the ingredients on Lois and rats her out to other local women. Lois and Meg begin to secretly sell the bootleg pumpkin spice lattes out of their garage, but are caught by Joe who used Quagmire's foot database called The Footbook to identify Lois's footprint at the crime scene. While fleeing, the two regret their actions after seeing how much things escalated, but admit that the experience allowed them to bond. They surrender after realizing that the peppermint mocha is available after the pumpkin spice latte. In the final scene, Lois and Meg have been sentenced to community service alongside Quagmire after Joe told his fellow police officers about The Footbook.
449	3	"Man-Fest Destiny"	Greg Colton	Travis Bowe	February 22, 2026	PACX15	0.84
During Quahog Fleet Week at The Drunken Clam, Peter and the guys meet the Navy Seal who killed Osama Bin Laden, who hints that his remains drifted near Quahog. The guys decide to find them and create a tourist attraction. Meanwhile, Brian informs Stewie about the concept of memes, and he instantly becomes hooked despite being told about the lack of originality and effort that goes into them. While at sea, Peter laments Lois's nagging and wishes for a world with only men, before the boat is struck by lightning. Everyone washes ashore to find a male-only community, later revealed by Lois to be Fire Island. The guys enjoy their time, but decide to leave after learning that older, uglier men have to cover everyone else's expenses. Stewie's posts quickly go viral and he lands a book deal, publishing a novel that consists of him explaining jokes. Fed up with his obsession, Brian and Chris subject Stewie to a "lobotomeme" to flush the memes out of his brain. Barely escaping with the help of a cocaine-fueled deer, Peter returns home and apologizes to Lois. When Lois starts to talk about her dreams, Peter returns to Fire Island with the $5,000.00 he owed. In the final scene, Stewie reveals to the viewer that the "lobotomeme" only partially worked.
450	4	"Bringing Up Brady"	Jerry Langford	Chris Regan	March 1, 2026	PACX16	1.05
Peter and the guys use Meg's new job as a chowder vendor at Gillette Stadium to get close to Tom Brady (Josh Robert Thompson) while he is working as an announcer. Meg escorts them out and gets noticed by Brady, who decides to use her behind the scenes to better his commentary. Meg believes she is formed a connection with him, but overhears that she is only being used for her skills. At his next gig at the Super Bowl, she baits him into proposing to her, but they ultimately do not go through with the marriage after Brady admits how much he needs Meg's help and declares that no one is allowed to eat cheese in his house. Meanwhile, Stewie realizes how old his bedroom's furniture is, prompting Brian to take him to Ikea. The two decide to move into the store so they can try out new interiors every day, before Stewie gets the idea to disguise the store as a mansion and throw a dinner party. Things go wrong when none of the fixtures work due to a lack of plumbing or gas, and several guests get bound and gagged in storage when they discover the ruse. Brian and Stewie ultimately call the party off due to having already taken a group photo with the guests. In the final scene, the gagged guests are discovered, with Matt Lauer being suspected of this crime.
451	5	"Dear Francis"	Joseph Lee	Matt Porter & Charlie Hankin	March 1, 2026	PACX17	0.75
After returning from a Red Sox game, Peter turns his baseball cap around to remove a spider from the kitchen. The backward cap turns Lois on and she initiates sex. Peter calls out "Francis" during the exchange, which worries Lois, who thinks he is referring to his deceased father. In actuality, Peter is referring to The Drunken Clam's attractive new waitress, though Quagmire, Cleveland, and Joe insist he keep it a secret. Lois takes Peter to a therapist named Dr. Snelling (Alfred Molina), who tasks him with bonding more with his kids and writing a letter to his dad. Peter does not write the letter, but while visiting his dad's grave, he breaks down after his phone dies in the middle of a sexy video of Frances and Patrick Dempsey. Mistaking this for a breakthrough, Lois brings the whole family to the Clam, where she discovers the truth about Frances, gets extremely angry at Peter, and advises her husband not to return to their house. After his Say Anything...-type plan to win her back with a boombox that has a sound effect tape and a butt kite fails, Peter bunks with Quagmire and is advised to be open with Lois. He visits her with a letter to his dad vowing to be a better father than he was. This wins Lois back, who admits she fantasizes about Chris Hemsworth during sex. In the final scene, Frances is revealed to have stopped coming to work due to Lois, Bonnie, and Donna abducting her and dropping her off at a nursing school in Denver.
452	6	"Viewer DMs"	Julius Wu	Patrick Meighan	March 8, 2026	PACX18	0.89
In a follow-up to "Family Guy Viewer Mail 1" and "Family Guy Viewer Mail 2", Stewie and Brian read DMs from fans and tell three short stories based on their ideas.: Lord of the Earring explains why Chris' earring vanished after the early seasons by parodying The Lord of the Rings trilogy. Frodo Baggins (portrayed by Chris) is sent on a quest to destroy the earring in the fires of Mt. Doom alongside a party that includes Gandalf (portrayed by Herbert), Aragorn (portrayed by Peter), Legolas (portrayed by Quagmire), and Gimli (portrayed by Joe), though everyone leaves part of the way through due to various reasons. Gollum (portrayed by Stewie) shows up and tags along instead. With the armies of orcs, trolls, and Morks from Orks pulling away from Mount Doom, Sauron (Chris Diamantopoulos) catching a glimpse of Galadriel (voiced earlier by Lois) bathing, and Frodo and Gollum's encounter with Harrison Ford, Gollum ultimately sacrifices himself alongside the earring which fell with Ford. Much to Gollum's dismay, he complains about the score in the background, which is "Kokomo" by The Beach Boys.; Go East, Fatman sees the Griffins' ancestors decide to move to Quahog after tiring of their life in Oregon. Following the Oregon Trail eastward, they endure wide rivers, snowy mountains, and the deaths of many Megs before stealing a log cabin from an indigenous family. When in the snowy mountains, Peter prays for a miracle to God as an angel named Jerry clears the path for the Griffins to get through. Everyone is happy to arrive as Peter has the Native American family in one house evicted because they failed to invent guns. Peter goes to work on a whaling ship and rants that their history will be ignored in two hundred years. He also declares New England will suck until Tom Brady exists.; The Glenn Quagmire Giggity Good Time Hour details the only known episode of a variety show Quagmire made in the 1960s. In it, he performs a variety of skits and musical numbers in which he constantly spells out and laughs at his own jokes, much to the annoyance of an offscreen Peter. He has Orson Welles, Tiny Tex, and a writer named Dr. Sharon Feinblatt (portrayed by Lois) as his guest star. In one sketch with a nurse (Allison Munn), Quagmire mentions the other nurse is his niece who is on the show as a favor from his brother. Quagmire ends his show because the 1970s have arrived and it will not need his show.; In the final scene, Stewie lets past the marching band from the last segment.
453	7	"Scent of a Woman"	Brian Iles	Steve Callaghan	March 8, 2026	RACX01	0.82
At Goldman's Pharmacy, Brian shows Stewie his ability to identify people's diseases just by sniffing them. He later swipes what he thinks is Patty's bra at Meg's Toronto Raptors-themed birthday sleepover, where his nose detects breast cancer. Meg reveals that the bra is hers, and upon learning she might die, reveals her biggest bucket list item: eating garbage can nachos at Chaz Inferno's in Florida. Brian agrees to help make it happen. Meg later gets a call from Dr. Hartman revealing that she does not have cancer. She decides to keep it a secret, though Brian gets called the next day and learns the truth. When called out by Brian on her selfishness, Meg admits her true dream was to spend quality time with a family member who was not mocking her. Meanwhile, Peter gets hooked on truth or dare via the same sleepover and initiates a game with Lois, who backs out upon being asked how many men she has slept with. Upset at leaving the game unfinished, Peter repeatedly tries to get an answer until Lois accepts his dare to rollerblade off the Swansons' roof into their pool, only to miss and break her leg. Peter apologizes, but Lois decides to confess that she has slept with sixty men. Although this upsets Peter, Lois lies and says he is bigger than those other men.
454	8	"Play Time"	John Holmquist	Alex Carter	March 15, 2026	RACX02	0.73
To raise enough money to save the Quahog Playhouse, Lois organizes three back to back plays on the same night. The Griffins and their friends perform renditions of three plays: In To Kill a Mockingbird, Fatticus Inch (portrayed by Peter) is a lawyer who is the father of Scout (portrayed by Stewie) and Jem (portrayed by Meg). When defending a black man named Tom (portrayed by Cleveland) in court where a white woman (portrayed by Lois) accuses him of assault. Though Inch tries to find prove that the woman is lying, Brian gets annoyed with an actual mockingbird that is mocking him. It is also shown that there is a poorly built balcony that Donna, Ollie Williams, Preston Lloyd, Brick Baker, and other black characters are on as Joe plans to find recruits for his murderball team should anyone get injured. As the jury (one member portrayed by Seamus) finds Tom guilty where he is sentenced to death by the judge (portrayed by Dr. Hartman) and executed offscreen, Brian chases off the mockingbird whose parents are in the audience. When walking home, Scout and Jem are attacked by Bob Ewell (portrayed by Carter) and are saved by Poo Badley (portrayed by Chris). Brian comes in with the mockingbird's corpse stating that he killed the mockingbird as its parents assume that their son is playing dead.; In The Odd Couple, Felix (portrayed by Quagmire) asks a man named Oscar (portrayed by Peter) if he can move in since his wife kicked him out. During their time together, Felix gets annoyed with Oscar's filth as Quagmire breaks the fourth wall by scolding Peter for pooping in the prop toilet. This causes Joe to summon Meg to bring some tongs to help with the poop removal. Another incident causes Dan/Ida to take her leave. Felix and Oscar then play cards with two guys (portrayed by Cleveland and Joe) while Oscar plays a radio that would broadcast one of Mickey Mantle's successful baseball moves. When it came to their date with the Pigeon Sisters (portrayed by Lois and Bonnie), Felix finally caves in on Oscar's living habits. Oscar later kicks Felix out as Cosmo Kramer (portrayed by Chris) comes in saying "He's out". The poorly-built balcony collapses injuring the black characters as Joe plans to see if any of them will join his murderball team.; In Hamlet, the King of Denmark (portrayed by Peter) is dead and his brother Claudius (portrayed by Quagmire) moves in and marries the Queen of Denmark (portrayed by Lois) with the scene being interrupted by the same radio that Peter forgot to remove. Hamlet (portrayed by Chris) deals with the stress of all of this and the fact that Claudius has married his mom. The ghost of his father shows up and has him deal with a list of demands that involve re-enacting the pottery scene from Ghost, removing some posters, and dealing with Claudius. Lois interrupts, acknowledging everything that's gone wrong, and decides to skip to the ending. Hamlet successfully trounces his uncle.; In the final scene, everyone takes a bow and the Quahog Playhouse is saved. A narrating Peter reveals that it was not due to the money but rather due to Quahog legalizing Lauren Boebert-style sex acts in theaters. The Ghost of William Shakespeare is even pleased.
455	9	"Phony Montana"	Joe Vaux	Mike Desilets	March 15, 2026	RACX03	0.77
While attending a migrant support rally, Brian hits on a Cuban-American food vendor named Carmen Perez (Melissa Fumero). After her original date is deported, she agrees to go on a date at the Quahog Havana Club, where the loud horn section and cigarette smoke give Brian a migraine. After passing out, Brian wakes up with a Cuban accent (provided by Carlos Alazraqui) and is concerned that he might offend Carmen if he speaks to her like that. After failing to get his old voice back on his own, Brian borrows an AI voice modulating necklace to wear to Carmen's cousin's wedding where Brian only attended because Stewie mentioned that Jenna Ortega was going to be there. The necklace malfunctions after squirrels chew on the wires. Unable to keep his accent hidden, Brian offends everyone and sets off a bread fight led by Carmen's parents (Alfred Molina and Alanna Ubach) that gets him knocked into the fountain, reverting his voice to normal but costing him Carmen. Meanwhile, Peter and Lois go on a double date with Crystal and Clay Duffy, who are actually swingers according to Joe, Quagmire, and Cleveland. Despite not being interested in sex but still wanting to be asked, Peter and Lois try to flirt, but take it too far after being invited to their house. Crystal and Clay reveal that they are swingers, but are not into them sexually. While arguing about their approach to the situation, Peter and Lois initiate violent sex on their couch before getting kicked out.
456	10	"A Few More Ways to Die in the West"	Greg Colton	Jordan Ramp	April 12, 2026	RACX04	0.71
In this wild west spoof, Quiet Burp (Peter) and his crew, consisting of Buffalo (Quagmire), Wild (Joe), and Django Unclaimed (Cleveland), are tasked with escorting rich businessman Vivienne (Carter) on a train trip, before Vivienne's cash is swiped by a bandit before some train robbers could. Giving chase with the promise of a $5,000 bounty, they end up in a town named Golden Stream, where Burp falls in love with schoolteacher Lucy Stools (Lois). While shielding her nose from Burp's fart on their second date, Lucy unwittingly reveals herself to be the thief, having stolen the money so she could redistribute it to the families of soldiers affected by Vivienne's defective bone saw business. Burp reveals everything to his gang, who ties him up and attempts to collect the bounty for themselves. Sheriff West (Wild West) allows him and Lucy to flee as the others pursue them. Meanwhile, Kitt (Stewie) and Dog Holloway (Brian) are struggling as an improv group after having to fire John Wilkes Booth for killing Abraham Lincoln. Upon arriving in Golden Stream and botching their first show, they attempt various failed schemes to get by, from opening a wet goods store to panning for gold. While arguing, they find gold embedded in a cliffside and use dynamite to harvest it, unknowingly saving Burp and Lucy by crushing their opposition with a rockslide. In the end, Burp and Lucy prepare to marry while Kitt and Dog open a nightclub with their newfound wealth.
457	11	"Tall Stewie"	Jerry Langford	Hillman Hollister & Jack Stovitz	April 12, 2026	RACX05	0.79
When invited to a party, Stewie dons a Woody costume whose boots drastically increase his height and make him feel more assertive. Letting it go to his head, he purchases Uncle Sam stilts to get even taller, only for Brian to buy his own pair. Meanwhile, Lois berates Peter at the clothing store after he rips his pants in church. Peter is persuaded by Quagmire to join a dating app to prove women find him attractive. Despite not getting any bites, he discovers that Lois is on the app too. While bickering, Stewie and Brian attract the attention of models Sydney and Odette (Sydney Sweeney and Alana Haim), who are turned on by their height and take them clubbing. The two promise to have hot tub sex with Brian and Stewie if they can pass one more athletic test on the beach. Stewie nearly drowns after falling off his stilts, and Brian removes his to rescue him. Brian admits he was jealous about being the short one, but Stewie reassures him that they will always be best friends. Sydney and Odette dump them and move on to another baby-dog duo with fake muscles. Peter creates a persona using Chris' bus driver to prove Lois is cheating. On their date, Lois admits she is only on the app to seek validation from other men and she and Peter agree to compliment each other more often.
458	12	"Lower G.I. Joe"	Joseph Lee	Damien Fahey	April 26, 2026	RACX06	1.07
Peter and the guys all have colonoscopies scheduled on the same day, but are nervous and decide to physically prepare themselves at a rental cabin. After the procedure, Dr. Hartman reveals that Peter had a G.I. Joe scout toy from the 80s inside his intestine, which Cleveland discovers is worth $100,000. Peter refuses to share the money, prompting his friends to sue him to split it among them. Meanwhile, Brian chaperones Stewie's field trip to the animal shelter, where he kills a kitten on instinct after briefly bonding with it. Mayor Wild West announces that the cat is his, promising to punish whoever took him. Stewie and Brian find a look-alike among Elle Hitler's cats, only for Brian to get spooked and kill it on instinct too. Chris is able to defend Peter after studying Anal Salvage Law, though Peter is soon invited to Chris Christie's auction house to get the cash. He ultimately swallows the toy, figuring that no sum of money is worth losing his friends. When Brian and Stewie inform Mayor West of what happened, he reveals that his cat is just fine, having merely been playing dead as the other cat was doing the same thing. Mayor West nonetheless punishes Brian by calling him a bad boy six times. In the final scene, Quagmire suggests renting the same cabin for the next colonoscopy in five years, but Peter reveals that the owner was mad about the mess. Consuela is sent to clean it up, but tosses the whole house instead.
459	13	"Friend's Best Man"	Julius Wu	Polina Diaz	May 3, 2026	RACX07	0.65
After reading about Blake Lively's love life in People, Stewie is sad that he is unmarried, but soon resolves this when he announces that Rupert proposed. Brian is hurt that Chris was chosen as the best man while he's relegated to ring-bearer, and is mistreated throughout the planning process. Meanwhile, during a stay-home date, Peter and Lois decide to film a sex tape, but are ashamed of the results. Peter accidentally posts it to YouTube, where it goes viral and earns a warm reception. Mayor Wild West declares them recipients of an NAACP Image Award for the inadvertent body positivity message spread through the video, which catches them off guard. Brian only attends the wedding after Chris points out his selfishness, though Stewie gets cold feet and reveals it was all a ruse to make Brian jealous, as he wanted him to propose in order to validate their friendship. Brian agrees, though the two are barred from getting a marriage license. Chris' narration states that he had to marry Elle to keep the deposit, and she got arrested. He also states that he is also up for an NAACP Image Award. In the final scene, Peter and Lois decide not to care what others think and profess their love.
460	14	"Let the Goodtimes Walk"	Mike Kim	Matt McElaney	May 10, 2026	RACX08	0.62
During a fundraiser at Adam West High, Peter purchases a saxophone from the defunct school band, though his attempts to master the solo from George Michael's "Careless Whisper" get on everyone's nerves. Unable to sleep, Joe borrows a powerful sleep aid from Quagmire, which lets him sleepwalk and also gives him a more upbeat demeanor. After being called in by Dr. Hartman, Alex Guerrero explains that the drug effectively turns Joe's sleepwalking self into a separate persona whom he has no memories of when the pill wears off. Dubbing this persona "Joey Goodtimes", Joe keeps taking the pills, throwing wild parties and bettering his sex life with Bonnie, though he realizes that everyone prefers the new him. During a golf trip, Peter, Cleveland, and Quagmire struggle to keep up with Joey. They soon come to realize that having the old Joe around helped them feel better about themselves and manage to wake him up with a series of boring questions. In the final scene, Joe is happy to feel accepted again and reveals that he poured the remaining pills into the final hole at the golf course, where they fall into the paws of a groundhog couple.
461	15	"High School History"	Steve Robertson	Patrick Meighan	May 17, 2026	RACX09	0.75
As Stewie is on the phone with tech support, Brian starts by reciting history lessons at inopportune times as Stewie claims that Brian is doing community service. French Revolution – In 1789, King Louis (portrayed by Chris) and Marie Antoinette (portrayed by Meg) are told by an advisor (portrayed by Principal Shepherd) that France is in debt due to their lavish parties that involve music from Baz Luhrmann's Moulin Rouge! and decide to tax the poor. Maximilien Robespierre (Brian) and Georges Danton (Stewie) decide to lead a revolution, which ends with them beheading the monarchs, before becoming too power hungry and executing the King's gendarmerie (portrayed by Joe), the lady who yelled during the meeting (portrayed by Lois), J. K. Rowling because "everyone knows why", a man named Josh who posted a photo of the beach with the quote "My office for the day", Danton, and Robespierre. When a dying Dontan stated that they didn't do one song from Les Misérables, a dying Robespierre stated that the story was set during the Rebellion of 1832. Lois confronts Chris and Meg about her missing jogging bras as Brian tells another story. Chris assumes that its a community service thing and that he stole an order for a guy at Starbucks. American Civil War – In 1861, Abraham Lincoln (portrayed by Peter) is elected President just before the American Civil War starts. Mayor Wild West's narration also stated that he had to learn how to play the violin because they blew the music budget on the Moulin Rouge stuff and that his violin performance was once wisecracked by Howie Mandel on America's Got Talent. After talking with Frederick Douglass (portrayed by Cleveland), William H. Seward (portrayed by Quagmire), and Edwin Stanton (portrayed by Joe), Lincoln decides to send slaves into the army under the leadership of Ulysses S. Grant (portrayed by Brian), while also bumping John Wilkes Booth (portrayed by Stewie) from a stage production hosted by an 1861 version of Bob Hope. After the Union troops win the war, Booth assassinates Lincoln out of revenge and then jumps onto the stage quoting "Did I do that?" At the Drunken Clam, Peter is chatting with Quagmire, Cleveland, and Joe about the final Dilbert comic strip. Brian begins his next story as Quagmire assumes that its part of his community service where it was assumed that he attacked one of the grocery robots. World War II – In 1939, World War II broke out as Mayor West also narrates that he got better at the violin while declining a request to play something from Mumford & Sons. President Franklin D. Roosevelt (portrayed by Joe) initially declines to intervene in World War II when contacted by Winston Churchill (portrayed by Peter). Churchill dispatches one of his generals (portrayed by Brian) to go meet with Joseph Stalin before the Nazis win him over. This changed when Pearl Harbor is bombed. He manages to thwart the Nazis, where Adolf Hitler (portrayed by Stewie) is busy arguing about the Von Trapp family fleeing with three Nazis (portrayed by Ernie the Giant Chicken, Principal Shepherd, and Seamus). Before dying, Roosevelt tells Harry Truman (portrayed by Chris) to make peace with Japan, but he misconstrues this as an order to bomb Hiroshima. After the final story, Brian admits to the viewers that he did this as part of the community service. He asks the viewers to click on the link in the Quahog County Courthouse email that was sent to them and fill out the short web form. Brian then quotes "So, turns out you can legally buy Jenna Ortega as many new bed sheets as you want, you just can't deliver them in person. So we all learned something this week. Sleep tight, Jenna."

== Production ==
On April 2, 2025, Family Guy was renewed by Fox for a further four seasons, bringing the number of seasons up to twenty-seven.

== Release ==
The season premiered with a holiday special on Hulu on October 6, 2025, followed by another holiday special released on November 28, 2025. The full season premiered on Fox on February 15, 2026 as part of Fox's Animation Domination programming block along with Universal Basic Guys, Bob's Burgers, and the return of MacFarlane's sister show American Dad! during the 2025–26 television season.
