= Family Guy season 14 =

Season of television series

Family Guy
- Season 14
- DVD cover
- Showrunners: Steve Callaghan; Richard Appel
- Starring: Seth MacFarlane; Alex Borstein; Seth Green; Mila Kunis; Mike Henry
- No. of episodes: 20

Release
- Original network: Fox
- Original release: September 27, 2015 – May 22, 2016

Season chronology
- ← Previous; Season 13 Next → Season 15

The fourteenth season of Family Guy aired on Fox in the United States from September 27, 2015, to May 22, 2016. The season contained 20 episodes.

The series follows the dysfunctional Griffin family, consisting of father Peter, mother Lois, daughter Meg, son Chris, baby Stewie and the family dog Brian, who reside in their hometown of Quahog. Season 14 contains the series' 250th episode, which is the season premiere.

Guest stars for the season include Joe Buck, Kyle Chandler, Glenn Close, Anil Kapoor, Kate McKinnon, John Mellencamp, Ed O'Neill, Liam Payne, Louis Tomlinson, and Neil deGrasse Tyson.

During this season, the guys head to South Korea after discovering Quagmire's past as a Korean soap-opera star ("Candy, Quahog Marshmallow"), Chris becomes a registered sex offender ("An App a Day"), Stewie has a nightmare and sends Brian into his mind to find the root of the problem ("A Lot Going on Upstairs"), Stewie builds a robot friend ("Guy, Robot"), Peter's drunken antics gets the town's drinking age raised to 50 years old ("Underage Peter"), Brian and Stewie get hooked on Adderall ("Pilling Them Softly"), Peter reunites with his bullying estranged sister ("Peter's Sister"), and Chris runs for homecoming king ("Run, Chris, Run").

== Voice cast and characters ==
- Seth MacFarlane as Peter Griffin, Brian Griffin, Stewie Griffin, Glenn Quagmire, Tom Tucker, Carter Pewterschmidt, Dr. Elmer Hartman, Dan Quagmire/Ida Davis, Seamus Levine
- Alex Borstein as Lois Griffin, Tricia Takanawa, Babs Peweterschmidt
- Seth Green as Chris Griffin
- Mila Kunis as Meg Griffin
- Mike Henry as Cleveland Brown, John Herbert, Bruce

=== Supporting characters ===
- Martha MacIsaac as Patty
- Christina Milian as Esther
- Emily Osment as Ruth, Various
- Kevin Michael Richardson as Cleveland Brown Jr., Jerome
- Jennifer Tilly as Bonnie Swanson
- Patrick Warburton as Joe Swanson
- Adam West as Mayor Adam West
- Sanna Lathan as Donna Tubbs-Brown
- Christine Lakin as Joyce Kinney
- Rachael MacFarlane as Miss Tammy

== Episode list ==
No. overall	No. in season	Title	Directed by	Written by	Original release date	Prod. code	U.S. viewers (millions)
250	1	"Pilling Them Softly"	Jerry Langford	Hayes Davenport	September 27, 2015	CACX17	2.87
When Stewie is diagnosed with ADHD, he receives a prescription for ADHD meds. Brian, who initially protests against kids freely being put on ADHD medication regardless of whether or not they have the condition, soon learns of the pills' productive benefits and uses them to write a book proposal to author George R. R. Martin. Meanwhile, Peter and Quagmire compete against one another to decide who gets to keep their own cooking show.
251	2	"Papa Has a Rollin' Son"	Steve Robertson	Danny Smith	October 4, 2015	CACX18	3.56
Peter, Cleveland, and Quagmire set out to find Joe's estranged father Bud, when Father's Day approaches. However, when they learn that Joe's father hates handicapped people, Peter volunteers to pretend to be Joe. Meanwhile, Stewie befriends a tiny Tom Cruise when he is disappointed to learn that he will grow up to be 5'1".
252	3	"Guy, Robot"	Mike Kim	Chris Regan	October 11, 2015	DACX02	2.79
Stewie builds himself a new robot friend after he and Brian get themselves into a fight. Meanwhile, Lois forces Peter to buy a new mattress.
253	4	"Peternormal Activity"	Greg Colton	Chris Sheridan	October 25, 2015	CACX16	3.85
Disappointed at the theater after watching a horror sequel, Peter and the guys decide they can make a better horror movie. They sneak into an abandoned asylum for inspiration. However, they accidentally murder a man and attempt to blame it on someone else. Meanwhile, Brian acts more pretentious wearing glasses, which Stewie vows to destroy. He eventually resorts to violence and smashes them off Brian's face with a baseball bat.
254	5	"Peter, Chris & Brian"	Joe Vaux	Patrick Meighan	November 8, 2015	DACX03	2.58
Peter finds an old video tape, when returning to his mother's old house to retrieve his porn collection. When he views the video tape, he realizes that he is a failure. Because of this, Peter forces Chris to spend time with Brian, so he doesn't turn out a failure as well.
255	6	"Peter's Sister"	John Holmquist	Tom Devanney	November 15, 2015	DACX04	2.91
When Peter's estranged sister, Karen, who is a wrestler, comes to visit for Thanksgiving, Meg finds that Karen is a bully who treats Peter the same way he treats her, Peter decides to become a female wrestler in order to defeat his sister in the ring.
256	7	"Hot Pocket-Dial"	Steve Robertson	Aaron Lee	November 22, 2015	DACX06	3.37
Quagmire discusses with Ida that he is in love with Lois, during an accidental pocket dial to Peter. Peter becomes furious with Quagmire over this, which results in Lois attempting to resolve the situation.
257	8	"Brokeback Swanson"	Julius Wu	Ted Jessup	December 6, 2015	DACX07	3.63
When Peter and the guys decide to run with the bulls, Joe is severely injured during the run and becomes a quadriplegic. Meanwhile, Brian sleeps with a woman named Tori, who is married to a Navy SEAL named Vic who is bitter over not being credited for killing Osama bin Laden. In order to avoid the ire of Tori's husband, he pretends to be their new dog.
258	9	"A Shot in the Dark"	Brian Iles	Mike Desilets	December 13, 2015	DACX05	3.74
When Peter notices that his couch has been stolen from his lawn, he forms a neighborhood watch group. While on duty, he accidentally shoots Cleveland Jr. and is immediately arrested for a hate crime and deemed racist when he accidentally burns Cleveland's property. When Peter apologizes to Cleveland, he voluntarily takes the blame for the incident.
259	10	"Candy, Quahog Marshmallow"	Joseph Lee	Cherry Chevapravatdumrong	January 3, 2016	DACX01	3.26
When Peter and the guys find out that Quagmire starred in a South Korean soap opera, they set out to find the final tape of the series. Unable to do so, they travel to South Korea in order to find it. When they arrive in Korea, Quagmire ends up falling in love with his co-star/former lover, Sujin.
260	11	"The Peanut Butter Kid"	Greg Colton	Artie Johann	January 10, 2016	DACX08	3.92
After the Griffin family's bank account begins to run dry, Peter and Lois have Stewie star in a peanut butter commercial. Peter and Lois soon start getting hooked on making Stewie a child star, which causes Brian to be concerned about their motives.
261	12	"Scammed Yankees"	Jerry Langford	Ray James	January 17, 2016	DACX09	3.40
Peter and Carter travel to Africa to get their money back after they are swindled in an e-mail scam. Meanwhile, Brian pursues Meg's friend, Patty after finding out she has a surprisingly pretty body.
262	13	"An App a Day"	Mike Kim	Anthony Blasucci	February 14, 2016	DACX12	2.57
When Peter overloads his phone with apps, he buys a new one and gives his old one to Chris, ending with him becoming a registered sex offender when he sends a picture of his penis to a girl; meanwhile, Brian and Stewie join a tennis club and participate in a tournament, only for them to get kicked out in the end when Stewie threatens the official.
263	14	"Underage Peter"	Joseph Lee	Shawn Ries	February 21, 2016	DACX13	2.72
Thanks to his lifespan, Brian is the only one old enough to drink when Mayor West raises the drinking age to 50 following Peter's latest drunken antics, so Peter makes Brian buy his beer, only for the two to get sent to community service for breaking the drinking law.
264	15	"A Lot Going on Upstairs"	Joe Vaux	Steve Callaghan	March 6, 2016	DACX11	2.74
Peter turns the attic into a man cave when Stewie begins to have nightmares (with one of them being about messing up his line in the theme song) and refuses to sleep in his own bed. Stewie builds a device for Brian to go into his dreams and help him face his fears.
265	16	"The Heartbreak Dog"	Brian Iles	Lew Morton	March 13, 2016	DACX14	2.98
Brian kisses Bonnie on her 46th birthday party and she (briefly) leaves Joe. Meanwhile, Meg starts stealing from a retirement home after the residents she volunteered to help mistreat her.
266	17	"Take a Letter"	John Holmquist	Kevin Biggins	April 17, 2016	DACX15	2.93
Lois takes a job as a postal worker to pay for Stewie's school and discovers a letter Peter wrote to an old girlfriend who tries to come between them. Meanwhile, Stewie befriends a fellow student named Chadley and enlists Brian to help impress him.
267	18	"The New Adventures of Old Tom"	Steve Robertson	Travis Bowe	May 8, 2016	DACX16	2.76
Peter ends up getting lost in the mall overnight after his family abandons him. Meanwhile, Brian attempts to win over a girl by pretending to be a millionaire.
268	19	"Run, Chris, Run"	Julius Wu	Damien Fahey	May 15, 2016	DACX17	2.65
Chris gets elected homecoming king, but Meg discovers that the cool kids only voted for him in order to prank him. Meanwhile, Peter and the gang get jealous when Cleveland starts hanging out with Jerome, so they try to get him back.
269	20	"Road to India"	Greg Colton	Danny Smith	May 22, 2016	DACX18	2.59
Brian and Stewie go to India to find a tech support worker with whom Brian has fallen in love. Meanwhile, Peter becomes the center of attention when Joe invites him to bingo night.
