= Road to India (Family Guy) =

- Family Guy episode
- Episode no.: Season 14; Episode 20
- Directed by: Greg Colton
- Written by: Danny Smith
- Production code: DACX18
- Original air date: May 22, 2016

Guest appearances
- Barkhad Abdi as Abduwali Muse; Aseem Batra as Ranita; Jay Chandrasekhar as Indian Man; Cary Elwes as Chris Martin; Lucas Grabeel as Indian Kid; Rob Huebel as Executive; Anil Kapoor as himself; Dan Nainan as Jeb Bush; Russell Peters as Padma's Father; Sendhil Ramamurthy as Indian Man; Sheetal Sheth as Padma and Tapeworm

Episode chronology
← Previous "Run, Chris, Run"	Next → "The Boys in the Band"
- Family Guy season 14

"Road to India" is the twentieth episode and season finale of the fourteenth season of the animated sitcom Family Guy, and the 269th episode overall. It aired on Fox in the United States on May 22, 2016, and is written by Danny Smith and directed by Greg Colton. The episode is the eighth and final in the series of Road to... episodes.

In the episode, Brian and Stewie travel to India after the former becomes besotted with a tech support worker. Meanwhile, Peter goes to play bingo with Joe, and alienates his friend by becoming overly competitive at the pastime.

== Plot ==
Brian's computer freezes up and he calls technical support for assistance, where he becomes attracted to an employee named Padma and begins telling her lies to impress her. When Brian wishes to start a relationship with Padma. Brian travels to India to meet her, accompanied by Stewie. They go to tech support and find Padma. After spending time together, she invites him and Stewie to her family's home.

When they arrive, Brian and Stewie find that she is arranged to be married to a man named Dhiraj, much to Brian's surprise. Padma unexpectedly calls off the marriage by expressing her love for Brian, which makes her family upset, especially her father who had already paid a large dowry. Brian works to make money to pay back the dowry. Brian goes on Kaun Banega Crorepati to acquire the money; this ends badly when Brian is asked his first question by Anil Kapoor on the subject of cricket and gets it wrong, losing the game. When Brian meets up with Padma, he learns that her father did not need the dowry money back, and that Padma does not want to marry him. Brian is furious at being rejected after travelling such a long distance for her, but she tells him that she will always love him, because by preventing her marriage he saved her from a lifetime of unhappiness. She kisses him on the cheek just before she leaves. Brian tries to tell a disagreeing Stewie that it was the journey that mattered.

Meanwhile, Joe visits the Griffins and invites Peter to bingo night at an elderly parlor. Peter is reluctant, but Lois convinces him to go. At the parlor, Peter discovers that Joe is called "The Big Cheese" due to being the popular player there. Peter is not having fun, but to his surprise, he wins the first game. Peter's winning goes to his head, and he gets competitive while wearing clothing that makes him look high and mighty, eventually becoming the new Bingo Captain, much to Joe's dismay. Joe tells Peter that he only brought him there to have fun, and refuses to come to bingo, to Peter's indifference, but Lois expresses disapproval. When Peter goes to the parlor, Lois and Joe try to convince him to come home. When he stands his ground, Lois calls Chris and Meg to annoy Peter when he is playing, so he gives up and heads home.

The episode ends with Anil Kapoor, the Indian audience, Padma and her family, the Griffins, Joe, and minor characters singing and dancing the closing musical number while dressed in Indian clothing. When Brian joins in on the musical number, he is mauled by a Bengal tiger as everyone keeps dancing.

== Production ==
"Road to India" is the eighth episode of the series' Road to... series which aired through various seasons of the show. The episode was directed by Greg Colton, who previously directed the Road to... episodes "Road to Germany", "Road to the Multiverse", "Road to the North Pole" and "Roads to Vegas". It was written by Family Guy veteran Danny Smith. "Road to India" is Smith's second writing credit for a Road to... episode, after "Road to the North Pole".

== Cultural references ==
English playwright William Shakespeare is seen taking a walk in one of the cutaways, receiving homophobic abuse for wearing a ruff. In another, Peter competes in a "Tori Spelling Bee", spelling disparaging words about the actress. The wedding of Chris Martin and Gwyneth Paltrow is seen in another cutaway, where the minister concludes the service by saying "I now pronounce you pretentious and terrible". Peter explains that he is speaking incoherently after drinking four Ensure health drinks.

Stewie refers to India as "where the Beatles came to ruin their music", and a local queries the two Americans on why director Wes Anderson came there to make his "worst movie", The Darjeeling Limited. After a bad pun on New Delhi as New Deli by Stewie, the four-armed elephant-headed deity Ganesha plays a sting.

== Reception ==
"Road to India" scored a 1.2 rating in the 18–49 demographic, and was watched by 2.59 million viewers, making it Fox's highest-rated show of the night.

The episode received mixed reviews. Jesse Schedeen of IGN gave the episode 4.4 out of 10. He was critical of the subplot involving Peter, seeing it as another instance of Peter becoming obsessed with a new hobby, and deemed the character "an incredible jerk" for showing no contrition after ruining Joe's favorite activity. On the main plot, Schedeen felt that the opening scenes were too typical of Brian's egocentric and pretentious behavior, but it was still "pretty clever" to illustrate this with Brian not knowing what time zones are. He was not impressed by the jokes on India which he considered to be clichés, including references to overpopulation, reverence of cattle and the bindi. Schedeen noted that the episode lacked the Road to... staple of a long and humorous musical number, but he was impressed that Brian was finally being honest in a relationship and saved Padma from an arranged marriage.

However, Lisa Babick of TV Fanatic called the episode "hilarious from beginning to end", despite stating that she would have preferred an episode without a sub-plot. She found some jokes, including the Jeb Bush one, "incredibly ridiculous, but it was hard not to laugh". On a joke about Indians being shut down by pressing on their bindis, she judged that "I am ashamed to say I could not stop laughing at that scene. It was the most culturally offensive thing ever, but it was funny as hell".

Writing for TV Equals, Mark Trammell found the Indian clichés funny despite their stereotypical nature, and the Bollywood-style musical finale "admittedly a lot of fun".
