= Family Guy season 23 =

Season of television series

Family Guy
- Season 23
- Digital purchase image
- Showrunners: Richard Appel; Alec Sulkin
- Starring: Seth MacFarlane; Alex Borstein; Seth Green; Mila Kunis; Mike Henry; Patrick Warburton; Arif Zahir
- No. of episodes: 18 (Fox); 2 (Hulu); 20 (total)

Release
- Original network: Fox; Hulu (specials)
- Original release: October 14, 2024 – July 17, 2025

Season chronology
- ← Previous; Season 22 Next → Season 24

The twenty-third season of the American animated television series Family Guy premiered with a holiday special on Hulu on October 14, 2024, followed by another holiday special on November 25, 2024 on Hulu, with the season officially premiering on February 16, 2025, on Fox. The season concluded on July 17, 2025.

The series follows the dysfunctional Griffin family, consisting of father Peter, mother Lois, daughter Meg, son Chris, baby Stewie, and the family dog Brian, who reside in their hometown of Quahog.

Season twenty-three started the run of the twenty-second production season, which is executive produced by Seth MacFarlane, Alec Sulkin, Richard Appel, Steve Callaghan, Danny Smith, Kara Vallow, Mark Hentemann, Tom Devanney, Patrick Meighan, and Alex Carter. Sulkin and Appel returned as the series' showrunners.

== Voice cast and characters ==
- Seth MacFarlane as Peter Griffin, Brian Griffin, Stewie Griffin, Glenn Quagmire, Tom Tucker, Dr. Elmer Hartman, Seamus Levine, Carter Pewterschmidt
- Alex Borstein as Lois Griffin, Babs Pewterschmidt, Ellie Hitler
- Seth Green as Chris Griffin, Neil Goldman
- Mila Kunis as Meg Griffin
- Mike Henry as John Herbert, Bruce, Jeffrey, Consuela
- Patrick Warburton as Joe Swanson
- Arif Zahir as Cleveland Brown

=== Supporting cast ===
- Gary Cole as Principal John Shepherd
- Sam Elliott as Mayor Wild West
- Sanaa Lathan as Donna Tubbs-Brown
- Peter Macon as Preston Lloyd
- Kevin Michael Richardson as Jerome, Cleveland Brown Jr.
- Jennifer Tilly as Bonnie Swanson

== Episodes ==
No. overall	No. in season (Note: Episodes without an episode number within the season constitute exclusive episodes commissioned and released by Hulu.)	Title	Directed by	Written by	Original release date	Prod. code	U.S. viewers (millions)
425	–	"Peter, Peter, Pumpkin Cheater"	Joe Vaux	Travis Bowe	October 14, 2024	NACX19	N/A
Joe intends to enter a local giant pumpkin contest, which he has repeatedly lost to Patrick McCloskey (Glen Powell), but when Peter, Quagmire, and Cleveland get fed up with his obsession, they decide to sabotage him by hiding his entry, only to accidentally break it. Peter hides inside the pumpkin as an apology, and his weight nets Joe first place. McCloskey catches Joe cheating before it turns out that all entrants, including McCloskey himself, lied by hiding obese men inside their pumpkins. Meanwhile, Stewie intends for himself and Brian to go trick-or-treating as Sonny & Cher, but a falling out prompts Brian to walk out and try looking for some new friends to hang out with. Stewie brings Rupert (voiced by Derek Jacobi) to life, who hears his venting about wanting Brian dead and attempts to murder him. Stewie catches on to this and confronts Rupert, who is hurt that he always comes second to Brian and wants to eliminate the competition. Stewie reluctantly drowns Rupert in a toilet, reverting him to normal as Brian admits he has no other friends and apologizes for his selfishness. In the end, Stewie receives Rupert from the dryer and tells him everything that went down.
426	–	"Gift of the White Guy"	Jerry Langford	Joanna Quraishi	November 25, 2024	NACX20	N/A
Peter is mandated to attend a white elephant gift exchange at the brewery, but forgets to bring a gift until the last second. He ends up giving away a Christmas tree brooch that Lois received as a child, which ends up in the hands of Preston's mother, Widow Lloyd (Debra Wilson). Peter infiltrates the senior home with help from Joe, Cleveland, and Quagmire by dressing up like pest control guys, and the brooch is recovered without any complications. Meanwhile, after Brian hints that he might be on Santa Claus' naughty list, Stewie strives to be good, throwing away all his weapons and performing good deeds in order to get his desired gifts. After Meg finds his discarded vaporizer, however, the two wrestle with it, accidentally zapping Meg. Although initially concerned with covering up the mess, Stewie feels remorse and writes the truth in his letter to Santa, giving up his other requests in exchange for getting Meg back. On Christmas Day, Meg turns up alive under the tree, albeit with her legs on backwards. Peter returns Lois' brooch and explains what went wrong, with Lois ultimately deciding to return it to Widow. The two unknowingly stab her while trying to put it back on Widow Lloyd, causing her to bleed to death.
427	1	"Fat Gun"	Greg Colton	Artie Johann	February 16, 2025	NACX16	1.44
In a parody of Top Gun, Maverick (Peter) and Goose (Joe) are aspiring Naval pilots attending the titular flight school with Charlie (Lois) as their instructor who is also in a relationship with Maverick. After one of their missions ends in failure, Maverick feels guilt over the death of Goose and resigns to grieve for thirty-five years by playing out scenes in other Tom Cruise movies. Upon his return, he is tasked with instructing a new generation of pilots, including Goose's son Rooster (Chris), who is resentful over the death of his father as well as having his mother written out of the sequel. The two men succeed at their mission and manage to reconcile after a scorned Charlie shoots them down and captures them. After escaping in a stolen jet and being saved by a supposedly dead Iceman (Stewie), Maverick and Rooster return to base and are hailed as heroes. In the final scene, Peter mentions how well Top Gun: Maverick performed as he jumps out of an airplane with Tiny Tom Cruise.
428	2	"Live, Laugh, Love"	Brian Iles	Mike Desilets	February 23, 2025	NACX13	1.02
Peter jokes about eating his annual salad while texting the guys, but notices that Joe merely likes his texts whereas Cleveland and Quagmire always laugh. Peter confronts Joe about it and is told that he has never found him funny. Meanwhile, after worrying about the lack of proper supervision on Chris and Meg's field trip to Washington D.C., Lois decides to chaperone the trip, only to embarrass her children and earn scorn from their friends. She bonds with Principal Shepherd over their shared sadness and he opens up about his first love Shellie Barnes (Casey Wilson) whom he broke up with over a disagreement whether to combine Pizza Hut and Taco Bell in their proposed franchise. Peter tries sneaking into Joe's room at night and leaving a "Ha Ha" on his joke for him, but sets off the traps by his bed and gets injured falling down the stairs while running away. In the hospital, Peter apologizes for overreacting. Upon describing the injuries he's received, Joe finally laughs at him as he sheds a tear of joy. Lois discovers that Shellie lives near the hotel and convinces Shepherd to talk to her, only for them to discover that her dream failed, she has let herself go, and an ill uncle is living with her. Although Shepherd's time is ultimately wasted, Lois tells him to take heart in the fact that his life ended up better than hers.
429	3	"Drunk with Power"	John Holmquist	Julius Sharpe	March 2, 2025	NACX14	0.72
Preston orders Peter to start hosting guided tours of the Pawtucket Brewery. After his first attempt goes poorly, Peter is introduced to Brett Kavanaugh (Chris Cox), who is more interested in trying the beer than touring the brewery. The two get drunk and bond together. Upon waking up from his hangover, Peter discovers that Kavanaugh wants to trade lives and has placed his robe on him. At the United States Supreme Court, Peter's shenanigans allow him to befriend Amy Coney Barrett, Clarence Thomas, Elena Kagan, John Roberts, Ketanji Brown Jackson (Toks Olagundoye), Samuel Alito (Josh Robert Thompson), and Sonia Sotomayor (Alanna Ubach) until his family calls him out for ditching them. On the same call, Brian tells Peter about an upcoming ruling that may ban same-sex marriage. Meanwhile, Brett manages to befriend Joe, Cleveland, and Quagmire and spends days partying with them. However, he melts down upon witnessing the results of a wet T-shirt contest, claiming that they go against the rules. In an epiphany, he realizes that he can balance his love for beer with his love for rules and returns to the court. Peter convinces everyone to ban straight marriage as well as gay marriage before Kavanaugh interrupts and demands his seat back. Peter manages to get in one last argument, claiming that letting gay people get married actually takes away their freedom, saving gay marriage, before waking up back home after Kavanaugh slips him a Mickey.
430	4	"Lois C.K."	Steve Robertson	Evan Waite	March 9, 2025	NACX15	0.70
Peter is tasked with watching Stewie while Lois attends a 1990s nostalgia concert with Bonnie, Donna, and Elle Hitler where Sir Mix-a-Lot (voiced by himself) is among the performers. However, his element shenanigans make her late. While having a drink out, the ladies see Seamus bombing at an open mic and urge Lois to get on stage after she mocks his routine. Channeling her frustration at Peter and deriving jokes from his antics, she quickly finds success as a standup comedienne and takes the stage name Lois C.K., landing weeks of gigs and even a regional special. However, Peter is informed by Joe that Lois has been roasting him and decides to become more straight-laced in order to cut off the flow of new material. Desperate, Lois tries to tell jokes about Joe and Quagmire, but is nearly accosted by the audience. Peter jumps on stage to defend her and the two rapidly reconcile due to a shortage of runtime. In the final scene, Lois tells Peter that Joe has taken her place as people clap at his political humor, much to his annoyance. During the credits, there is a music video of Sir Mix-a-Lot's "Lady Kneecaps".
431	5	"The Chicken or the Meg"	Julius Wu	Emily Towers	March 16, 2025	NACX17	0.63
Meg signs up for a dating reality show titled Sex Farm in hopes of finding love. While dressed like a pig, Meg quickly hits it off with a guy in a chicken suit (Amir Talai). The two are eliminated early, before Meg's partner reveals that he is not only an actual chicken, but also the son of Ernie the Giant Chicken, named Nugget. The two continue to date in secret until Nugget sneaks into Meg's room, accidentally revealing himself to Peter, who is angered by the news. After he gives her an ultimatum, Meg decides to move in with Nugget's family. Despite being excited at first, Peter realizes how much he misses Meg and tries and fails to get her back by trading Brittney Griner (Debra Wilson) for her. When both families see each other at the bowling alley later, Ernie mocks Peter, which makes Meg feel bad for him. When Ernie demands that she either leave or renounce her father, Meg states that the two are just like each other, breaks up with Nugget, and decapitates Ernie before returning home. In the end, everyone is glad to have Meg back. She reveals that Nugget is also gay as evidenced by the abundance of small chickens in his texts. Stewie then surprisingly quotes "Nugget Nugget".
432	6	"Dog is My Co-Pilot"	Joseph Lee	Steve Callaghan	March 23, 2025	NACX18	0.69
Addicted to a flight simulator app, Brian becomes convinced that he can fly a plane with ease and boards Quagmire's next flight to prove it. Quagmire and his co-pilot Jim come down with food poisoning, allowing Brian to successfully land the plane. He and Quagmire are given Keys to the City by Mayor Wild West and are sent on a press tour to share their story. Quagmire feels humiliated due to being upstaged by Brian and being known as the one who defecated in the sink, and decides to quit his job. Meanwhile after Lois unearths her childhood Easy-Bake Oven from the closet, Stewie uses it to bake delicious pizzas. He and Chris decide to open a boutique pizza place in their backyard named Mount Ve-Stewvius, which quickly becomes a hit. However, the 1960s light bulb inside the oven burns out right as Dave Portnoy announces he's about to leave a review. Stealing a bulb from Herbert, the brothers manage to impress Portnoy in time only for Joe to shut down Mount Ve-Stewvius due to its lack of wheelchair access. Lois helps Brian realize that he took away the one positive thing about Quagmire's life, prompting him to make amends by sabotaging the duck boat on the last stop of their tour. Quagmire saves everyone aboard, blocking access to Quahog Harbor in the process, which gets him and Brian in trouble with Peter, Cleveland, and Joe who can't get the supplies they need. Later, Tom Tucker reveals that Brian never landed the plane in the first place, rather the autopilot did, to Brian’s dismay and Quagmire’s relief.
433	7	"Pitch Imperfect"	Mike Kim	Artie Johann	March 30, 2025	PACX01	0.72
At Oktoberfest, a drunk Lois nags Peter into winning her a carnival prize by knocking down milk bottles with a ball. Peter is unable to throw the ball properly due to his worn-out elbow as well as the fact that he learned how to throw from raccoons as a kid as opposed to his father who was too busy for him. He is mocked by his friends and family, who insult his masculinity, but is nonetheless invited to throw the ceremonial first pitch at a little league game. Meanwhile, Brian gets a chiropractic adjustment at Oktoberfest and feels ripped off by the expensive bill. Sure that he could do just as good a job, he and Stewie become chiropractors and open up BS Chiropractics. Things go well until Chris, who was operating the front desk, leaves to open Chris' Chiropractic No BS which differentiates itself by actually helping patients instead of exploiting them. The competition doesn't last long when agents from the United States Department of Health and Human Services arrive to shut down both clinics. Thanks to two days of training and a reverse psychology pep talk from Meg, Peter throws a perfect strike, injuring his arm in the process, and wins back everyone's respect, only to get funny looks after doing a girly victory lap. In the final scene, Meg helps Peter off the field as the baseball coach wants Peter to shower with the baseball players first.
434	8	"Hard Times at Adam West High"	Brian Iles	Steve Callaghan	April 6, 2025	PACX02	0.75
Chris recounts having to deliver an oral book report on Tom Sawyer, albeit with an erection large enough to keep him trapped in his desk. Ashamed, he prepares to run away, before Brian suggests borrowing Stewie's time machine to undo the incident. Meanwhile, Joe, Cleveland, and Quagmire decide to buy scratcher tickets and pool their earnings, though Peter decides to buy a horoscope scroll instead. In the past, Brian and Chris swap out present-day Chris for the previous one, saving his reputation, but resulting in present-day Meg's face being disfigured by a chemical explosion in the science lab. It turns out that the student body's laughter at Chris' erection originally distracted Meg from the chemicals enough to spare her from the accident. Peter gets jealous when the others win $123, especially after they show off their purchases. Feeling bad, Stewie, Chris, and Brian travel back in time to stop themselves from interfering. Present-day Chris gives himself an erection by looking up Lauren Boebert and saves the timeline by giving his report. Brian tells Chris that undoing his cringy teen moments is wrong, as such moments are necessary for his development. After stealing some scratchers, Peter gets arrested by the police. When the others bail him out with their remaining winnings, he reveals he was worried that his friends' earnings made them too good for him, and they apologize for making him feel bad.
435	9	"The Elle Word"	John Holmquist	Alex Carter	April 13, 2025	PACX03	0.68
Quagmire lets it slip to Peter, Joe, and Cleveland that he is seeing someone, but keeps her identity a secret. After a failed stakeout, it is discovered that he is dating Elle Hitler, a fact that the guys don't understand. Elle manages to win everyone over with her various quirks, but it is soon discovered that she is cheating on Quagmire, who has never given her an orgasm. Meanwhile, when Stewie is almost run over by Dr. Hartman in the Stop 'N Shop parking lot, Lois decides to put him on a leash. Brian uses this to his advantage and uses the leash to push Stewie around, but upon receiving disapproval from various leashed neighborhood dogs, he discovers that he's become the very type of dog owner he hates. Stewie is instantly run over by Caitlyn Jenner upon being released. After confessing that he doesn't know how to properly satisfy a woman, Quagmire changes up his lifestyle and gives up on sex until Peter reinvigorates him with the phrase "Who Else But Quagmire?" He attempts to finally please Elle, but she proves so great in bed that she gives him an orgasm-induced aneurysm which he survives.
436	10	"A Real Who's Hulu"	Steve Robertson	Matt Pabian	April 27, 2025	PACX04	0.71
Peter locates his missing iPad and reveals that he only now knows that the various panels on Hulu's interface are links to other shows besides Family Guy. He decides to click on a few shows.: Spoofing Only Murders in the Building, Tim (Peter) is murdered which is witnessed by his neighbors Mabel (Meg), Charles (Stewie), and Oliver (Brian). The trio takes it upon themselves to solve the crime, documenting their journey via podcast. A neighbor (Donna) points them to Jeffrey Dahmer (Chris), whom they believe is innocent despite the obvious signs. The neighbor gets arrested instead due to her hysterics. During a carriage ride in the park, Jeff prepares to murder the trio after drugging them into a coma.; Spoofing The Dropout, Elizabeth Holmes (Lois) barely manages to pitch a device that can determine which The Sopranos character a person is by entering one drop of blood. After opening a startup named "Quizznos," which is quickly taken over by Sunny Balwani (Peter), the device is shown not to work properly. They decide to fake its results to the shareholders for Walgreens, but one of their researchers (Chris) catches on and exposes them as frauds.; Spoofing The Bear, Carmy (Peter) returns to Chicago from his successful career as a New York chef to run his dead brother's Italian beef joint with brief help from Remy (Patton Oswalt). He manages to do so before a local food critic (Stewie) arrives to review his food. The parody is soon derailed as it's revealed that Chris is the only one who has seen the show and understands it unlike Peter.; The episode ends with Peter doing an in memoriam segment for various streaming services that have shut down consisting of Seeso, CNN+, FilmStruck, HBO Go, Quibi, and DC Universe while Sarah McLachlan's "I Will Remember You" plays in the background.
437	11	"China Doll"	Joe Vaux	Patrick Meighan	May 4, 2025	PACX05	0.66
A proud Brian shows Stewie and Chris a hole he dug in the backyard, where Rupert is revealed to be buried. While giving him a bath, Stewie discovers a "Made in China" tag on Rupert's back, realizing that their relationship is multicultural. He makes several attempts to get in touch with Rupert's Chinese heritage, but suspects that he wants to meet his family for real. With Brian begrudgingly joining him, Stewie finds the factory where Rupert was made and assumes that two random assembly line workers are his parents. Before he can ask for their blessing to marry Rupert, Stewie and Brian are arrested after their comments get them mistaken for American spies. Brian digs their way out of prison, but the two are recaptured and only granted freedom by ratting out another person. Stewie and Brian rat out Chris by claiming that he's a Pro-Tibet Richard Gere. Stewie decides that he does not need anyone's blessing to marry Rupert and professes his love, only to accidentally start a fight by using a racial term he did not know was an insult. Chris is later revealed to still be in a Chinese prison, having fooled the inmates and guards into thinking he really is Richard Gere as he answers their questions.
438	12	"One Foot in Front of the Mother"	Greg Colton	Matt McElaney	May 11, 2025	PACX06	0.78
When Lois grows concerned about Chris' health, she has him sign up for sports with Principal Shepherd's help. Chris can't get the hang of any until his bowels act up, unintentionally revealing his talent for speed walking as he hurries to the bathroom. Chris excels at the sport and joins Lois, Bonnie, and Donna on their walks, eventually overshadowing Lois and getting her excluded from the group. Lois challenges Chris, which he throws after she lags behind. Chris feels that Lois deserves her friends more than he does and admits that he's over the idea of adult female friends since they don't share nudes. Meanwhile, Brian barks loudly to warn the neighbors about a pack of coyotes on Spooner Street, unintentionally startling Quagmire into destroying his rice sculpture. Quagmire files a police report, prompting Joe to give Brian a shock collar until he can suppress his barking habit. Brian struggles adjusting to this new change due to his instincts, not helped by Quagmire repeatedly taunting him. Out of revenge, he swipes another collar from Joe's car and slips it on Quagmire, forcing him to speak quietly too. Brian later overhears Quagmire being attacked by the same coyotes he warned him about. Baiting them to attack, he uses the shocks from his collar to ward them off and explains that even though he may hate Quagmire, as a dog protecting his neighbors is his duty.
439	13	"The Fat Lotus"	Brian Iles	Steve Callaghan	May 18, 2025	PACX11	0.67
In a parody of The White Lotus, the Griffins and many of their friends witness a friend's casket getting lifted onto a plane. One week earlier, the gang vacations at the White Lotus Bermuda where a newly sober Brian is the manager. Peter and Lois disagree on how to spend their trip, culminating in Lois and Quagmire visiting St. David's lighthouse while Peter samples the world's best cheesecake. After the others suspect that Lois and Quagmire are having an affair in his absence, Peter discovers that they instead ate his cheesecake. When confronted, Lois reveals that they only had two bites and tossed the rest into the ocean out of guilt, before confessing that she was frustrated by Peter's neglect during what was meant to be a romantic vacation. Meanwhile, Stewie adopts the travel persona of Desmond Voyage and bonds with Bruce, Jeffrey, and their new friend Dennis. Elsewhere, Meg and Chris attempt to purchase a bottle of rum and a tourist t-shirt from the gift shop, but are caught off guard by the expensive prices. They attempt to shoplift but are caught by Brian, who relapses on the rum and trashes Stewie's room, fed up with his constant complaining. Stewie, Bruce, Jeffrey, and Dennis go on a volcanic hike where Stewie fears he will be sacrificed, only to realize that the sacrifice was just an unedited group selfie. In the end, Brian is fired for his drunken antics. Jeffrey loses his hat in the ocean and tries to retrieve it, but is killed by great white sharks who were lured into the bay by the discarded cheesecake. Dennis offers to come home with Bruce, quickly making him forget about his husband's death. Brian and Stewie plan to visit the Sicily White Lotus.
440	14	"Cool Hand Lois"	Jerry Langford	Maggie Mull	May 29, 2025	PACX07	0.59
At the Adam West High school auction, Lois outbids Bonnie for a couple's vacation along the coast. The next day, she accidentally walks in on Chris masturbating, before Meg informs her that self-pleasure is perfectly normal and encourages her to give it a try while Peter is out for the night. Feeling that she spends more time making others happy than herself, Lois becomes addicted to masturbation, neglecting her wifely duties in the process. She later bumps into Bonnie at a sex shop and the two bond over their new shared hobby, before they decide to start dating, shocking everyone. As their wives go on their couple's vacation, Peter and Joe feel emasculated, but decide to step in after enough ridicule from their inner circle. After noticing how happy the two women seem on their date, the men decide not to stop them, but still end up having sex at a motel as payback. In the final scene, Lois revealed to her family that she backed out of the affair due to it only sounding fun in theory. Peter nervously pretends he didn't cheat with Joe before shooing him away and calling off the couple's trip they'd planned.
441	15	"Martian Meg"	Joseph Lee	Matt Porter & Charlie Hankin	June 5, 2025	PACX08	0.46
Meg gets two tickets to Dua Lipa's laser concert, but her family and even Quagmire and Herbert refuse to go with her. She ends up going alone only to discover that Lois went separately alongside Bonnie and Donna. Feeling rejected, Meg discovers a space program for local losers with the goal of sending one student to Mars led by Commander Bensinger (Keith David). Meg passes her training, barely beating Seamus due to his wooden limbs disqualifying him. While she enjoys the resulting admiration, Meg ends up having second thoughts about space travel. Meanwhile, Stewie finds a unicorn doll at Goldman's Pharmacy and is smitten, naming them "Made In" and forming a throuple alongside Rupert. The trio gets along well until Made In and Rupert start to bond, making Stewie feel left out. In retaliation, he gives Made In to Brian, who only accepts after learning that they have a squeaker. Then he forces Rupert to watch them get ripped apart in the front yard. On launch day, when Lois fails to stop the countdown through words alone, she climbs onto the rocket before it crashes into the sea. Commander Bensinger reveals from his helicopter that her weight is what caused it to crash as she tells him her correct weight as he doubts it. During the rescue, Lois and Commander Bensinger continue their argument on her weight.
442	16	"Row v. Wade"	Julius Wu	Mike Desilets	July 3, 2025	PACX09	0.43
At Stewie's insistence, Brian reluctantly signs them up for The Price is Right after auditions open in New York and ends up winning a boat. He quickly lets this go to his head, prompting Stewie to call him out of his hypocrisy regarding game shows. Brian sets out to prove he has a social conscience by naming his boat "Row v. Wade" and picks up women from Texas to seek legal abortions up north. Meanwhile, Peter, Joe, Cleveland, and Quagmire drink themselves into a coma, during which Banksy paints on Peter's face. Peter accepts a job as an exhibit at the Quahog Urban Museum, but is soon convinced to auction himself away for a high price. Lois vandalizes the artwork before Banksy announces via Instagram that he intended for that to happen, stating that the real art was the people involved. Peter ends up being bought by Carter to hang in his living room despite being vandalized. While asking Meg for directions to the local abortion clinics, Brian learns from her that he owes $40,000 in taxes on the boat. He plans to give up a few women and pay it off by collecting abortion bounties off of them, but ends up giving up the boat instead.
443	17	"Karenheit 451"	Mike Kim	Evan Waite	July 10, 2025	PACX10	0.57
Brian decides to read Charlie and the Chocolate Factory as Stewie's bedtime story, only to discover that it's been heavily altered to be more progressive. Lois reveals that her advocacy group Mothers Invested in Literary Fixing are the culprits. Brian leads a protest against this move, which gets him noticed by Fox News. During an interview, Sean Hannity twists Brian's words to fuel his own narrative, but the exposure turns Brian's failed book Faster Than the Speed of Love into a bestseller among right-wingers. Meanwhile, Peter and his friends accidentally marry each other on two subsequent nights while drunk and decide to quit alcohol cold turkey. While sober, they discover that beer was the one thing that brought them together and decide to part ways due to a lack of commonality. Peter becomes a more attentive father and husband, but Lois eventually grows annoyed and plans an intervention to make him drink again. It works, and the guys return to The Drunken Clam where they willingly decide to let beer bring them together even at the cost of their family lives. Brian draws protests while attempting to read an excerpt, but both sides unite upon noticing how poorly written his book is and decide to only ban it.
444	18	"Twain's World"	Steve Robertson	Julius Sharpe	July 17, 2025	PACX13	0.51
After being dismissed from a writing class held by Professor O'Callaghan (Stephen Root) at a community college for his inability to come up with fresh ideas, Brian wishes he could find some inspiration. Stewie introduces him to numerous classic writers via his time machine, including Luke the Evangelist, Charles Dickens, Ernest Hemingway, and Mark Twain. After hitting it off with the latter, Brian insists he follow them back to the present, where they fill him in on the years he missed. While looking up some modern terms on Brian's phone however, Mark Twain becomes hooked on pornography and renounces writing, which puts classic literature in jeopardy. Figuring that Twain's stories are more important than Twain himself, Brian tries to sell off The Adventures of Huckleberry Finn as his own without updating the language. Joe and the rest of the students are offended by it and Brian gets expelled from Professor O'Callaghan's writing class. Chris reveals that Twain's influence has ruined porn and suspect that he's in California. Stewie and Brian discover that he's become a porn actor himself and convince him to go back to his time, knowing that anyone can make porn but not everyone can be a great writer. Twain agrees, but swipes a tug tube on his way home. In the final scene, the Griffin family see a commercial of Twain's Tug Tube business that Twain had also started and is now run by Mark Twain V. Brian and Stewie are concerned that this might be too big to undo as Chris is heard shouting who took his Tug Tube out of the dishwasher.

== Production ==
On January 26, 2023, Fox announced that Family Guy had been renewed for a 22nd and 23rd season.

It was announced in April 2024 that the season would air two holiday specials exclusively on Hulu and Disney+ internationally. The trailer for Season 23 was revealed at San Diego Comic-Con. This marks the first time since the eighth season episode "Partial Terms of Endearment" in 2010 that an episode of the series has not aired on Fox.

In May 2024, it was announced that a full season would be broadcast in 2025.

This season saw the show returning to air new episodes on Sundays instead of Wednesdays; from February 23 to March 23, 2025, the series aired at 8 p.m.; the February 16, 2025 broadcast, however, aired at 10 p.m. due to extended broadcasting of the 2025 Daytona 500 in some markets. From March 30 to May 18, episodes aired at 8:30 p.m. following The Simpsons as a result of the latter returning to its normal timeslot after a three-month hiatus. From May 29 to its final episode on July 17, episodes from this season aired on Thursdays at 9 p.m.

=== 25th anniversary ===
The series celebrated its 25th anniversary on April 19, 2024, at PaleyFest LA in which the cast and crew did a live table reading of an upcoming episode of the series. The holiday specials premiering on Hulu were announced the following day. The Halloween and Christmas episodes Peter, Peter, Pumpkin Cheater and Gift of the White Guy, respectively, were released in celebration of the series' 25th anniversary. In addition, Peter guest starred in an episode of Hot Ones.

== Release ==
The holiday specials premiered on Hulu on October 14 and November 25, 2024, while the full season premiered on Fox on February 16, 2025 during the 2024–25 television season on Fox's Animation Domination block, where it aired along with The Great North, Krapopolis, Grimsburg, and The Simpsons. Beginning on May 29, 2025, the show moved to Thursday nights where it aired alongside Bob's Burgers, The Great North, and Grimsburg.
