= Boys Do Cry (Family Guy) =

- Family Guy episode
- Episode no.: Season 5 Episode 15
- Directed by: Brian Iles
- Written by: Cherry Chevapravatdumrong
- Production code: 5ACX10
- Original air date: April 29, 2007

Guest appearances
- Drew Barrymore as Jillian; Bill Engvall as Duke Dillon; Gilbert Gottfried as Gilbert Gottfried Horse; Camilla Stull as beauty pageant contestant

Episode chronology
← Previous "No Meals on Wheels"	Next → "No Chris Left Behind"
- Family Guy season 5

"Boys Do Cry" is the 15th episode of the fifth season of the American animated sitcom Family Guy. It originally aired on the Fox network in the United States on April 29, 2007. The episode follows the Griffin family after Lois gets a job as an organist at the local church, and she insists that the rest of the family go to church with her. This eventually leads to Stewie drinking and throwing up during a sermon, which causes a mob to form around the Griffin household. In an attempt to prevent the town from supposedly exorcising the devil out of Stewie, the family escape and seek refuge in Texas.

The episode was written by series regular Cherry Chevapravatdumrong and directed by Brian Iles. The episode received generally mixed reviews from critics for its storyline and many cultural references. According to Nielsen ratings, it was viewed in 8.13 million homes in its original airing. The episode featured guest performances by Drew Barrymore, Bill Engvall, Gilbert Gottfried and Camilla Stull, along with several recurring guest voice actors for the series. "Boys Do Cry" was released on DVD along with four other episodes from the season on October 21, 2008.

== Plot ==
Lois gets a job as the new organist at the local church and forces her family to start attending mass on Sundays. After Stewie mistakes Communion wine for punch, he drinks too much and vomits, leading the citizens of Quahog to believe Stewie is possessed by Satan. When the priest wants to exorcise him, aided by everyone in town, the Griffin family escapes to Lois's sister Carol's house in Texas. Upon arriving at the home, Peter fits in well with the cowboys, but Brian is disgusted by the bigotry of the local residents. Stewie, cross dressing to protect his identity, begins using the name "Stephanie Griffin" and, after being convinced by Lois, enters a "Little Miss Texan" beauty pageant. Meanwhile, as part of an initiation into an after-school club, Meg and Chris sneak into George W. Bush's Crawford ranch to steal a pair of his underwear.

Lois soon hears that the search for Stewie has ended after people got distracted by news of the Super Devil (an entity described as 6 inches taller than the Devil, driving a flying motorcycle and armed with a jar of marmalade), but since she was hoping to instill "new moral values" in her family she decides not to mention that they can go home. Meanwhile, after branding a cow, things turn worse when Peter reveals that he is intellectually retarded . The men with him, who explain that Texas "executes the retarded", tie him to an electric chair, in an attempt to put him to death, but he is soon rescued by his trusty horse, revealed to be the Gilbert Gottfried of the horse community.

Later, Brian finds out from his girlfriend Jillian back in Quahog about the town calling off the search, and rushes to the pageant tells Lois, who says she has known for weeks which horrifies Brian. Stewie manages to win, but when his wig falls off during the crowning ceremony, the audience labels him as a "queer-o-sexual" and tries to rush the stage. The family is able to escape on the back of Gottfried, and return home to Quahog. The episode ends with Lois telling Peter that moral and family values don't come from where people live or who their friends are, but from people themselves and that they should embrace their lives, while Peter says that people should be careful what they watch, and not become religious with it, while breaking the fourth wall.

== Production ==
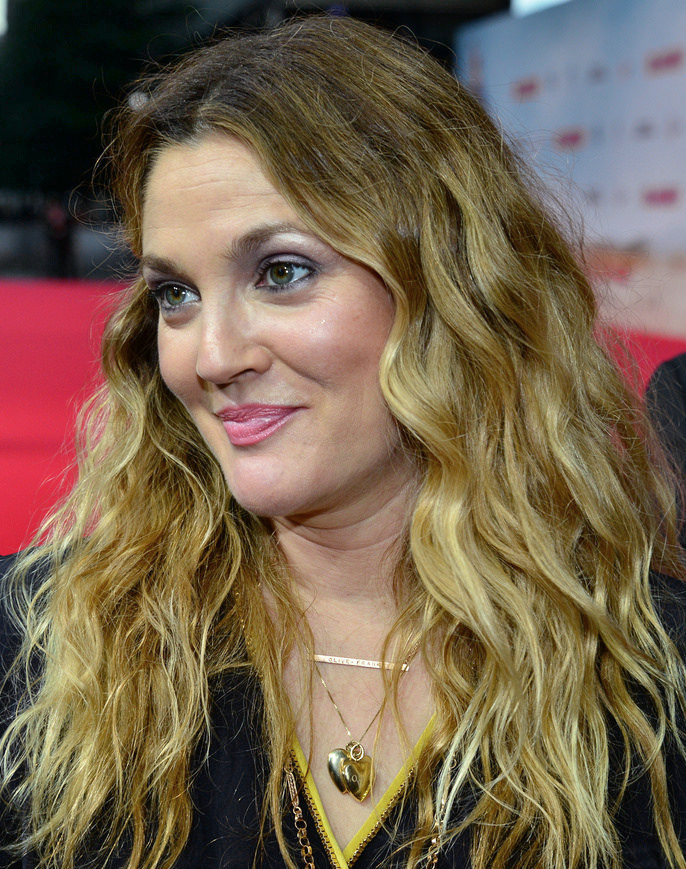
Drew Barrymore provided the voice of Jillian.

The episode was written by Cherry Chevapravatdumrong and was directed by Brian Iles, in his first episode for the series. Series regulars Peter Shin and James Purdum served as supervising directors. Chevapravatdumrong was also one of the executive story editors working in the episode, the other one being Patrick Meighan.

"Boys Do Cry", along with the four other episodes from Family Guy's fifth season, were released on a three-disc DVD set in the United States on October 21, 2008. The sets included brief audio commentaries by Seth MacFarlane and various crew and cast members, a collection of deleted scenes, a special mini-feature which discussed the process behind animating "100th Episode Special", and a mini-feature entitled Family Guy Live.

The episode featured a guest performance by a leukemia patient, Camilla Stull, who had wanted to do a voice on the show. She provided two lines for one of the competing pageant contestants. Stull has since died from the disease, but is still "immortalized" in the episode. In addition to Stull and the regular cast, actress Drew Barrymore and comedians Bill Engvall and Gilbert Gottfried guest starred in the episode. Recurring voices include Lori Alan, Alex Breckenridge, writer Kirker Butler, voice actor Chris Cox, actor Ralph Garman, writer Mark Hentemann, writer Danny Smith, writer Alec Sulkin, writer John Viener, and actor Adam West.

== Reception ==
In a slight decrease from the previous week, the episode was viewed in 8.13 million homes in its original airing, according to Nielsen ratings, in the United States. The episode also acquired a 2.9 rating in the 18-49 demographic, tying with The Simpsons, in addition to significantly winning over American Dad!, in both rating and total viewership.

In a review of the episode, Brett Love of TV Squad noted that the episode "had its moments, but there were some pretty big breaks between them." Love also thought that Lois getting a job as an organist was "a nice way to go, because it does fit in well with what we already know about her." Ahsan Haque of IGN said that the episode was "very stale and tired" with "very few funny moments," and that "Lois wanting a more wholesome ethical lifestyle could have worked, but the execution failed miserably." Overall, Haque noted that the episode was "a serious disappointment on many levels." The "lack of laughs, poor pacing, and lack of judgment really hurt," rating the episode as a 4 out of 10.

A cutaway gag featuring the one-off character Sneakers O'Toole would later become an Internet meme.
