= Run, Chris, Run =

- Family Guy episode
- Episode no.: Season 14; Episode 19
- Directed by: Julius Wu
- Written by: Damien Fahey
- Production code: DACX17
- Original air date: May 15, 2016

Guest appearances
- Simon Cowell as himself; Lucas Grabeel; Emily Osment as teenage girl/girl at the dance #1; Liam Payne and Louis Tomlinson as themselves; Jim Rash; Mae Whitman as sexy female librarian/girl at the dance #2; Uncredited: Jeff Garlin as himself (deleted scenes)

Episode chronology
← Previous "The New Adventures of Old Tom"	Next → "Road to India"
- Family Guy season 14

"Run, Chris, Run" is the nineteenth episode of the fourteenth season of the animated sitcom Family Guy, and the 268th episode overall. It aired on Fox in the United States on May 15, 2016, and is written by Damien Fahey and directed by Julius Wu. The title is a reference to the famous quote from Forrest Gump.

== Plot ==
During lunchtime at school, Principal Shepherd reminds the students to nominate for this year's homecoming king. After a brief discussion, Chris is nominated by just his best friend Neil Goldman. At home, Chris announces the news to his family to Lois' concern. The next day, Chris unexpectedly wins the election, to the surprise of Lois, Brian and Stewie, who had come to console him after he lost.

At home, Lois and Peter give Chris plenty of respect and congratulations for his success, causing him to act like a King. Meg however is skeptical about the votes, saying that they are part of an elaborate prank by the popular students, on account of the high school's liking of "making unpopular kids look stupid". Brian and Stewie attempt to sneak into the school to clarify this, but are thrown out after Brian gets distracted by two attractive teen girls. At night, they see a news story about Chris, "a big guy with a heart of dreams", becoming homecoming king, and realize after hearing his interviewed classmates responses that he was elected because they pitied him upon knowing of his "records". When Chris comes home he continues to believe he is a King of high importance and power, to Stewie and Brian's irritation. The next day, an exasperated Brian reveals the truth to a skeptical Chris, who refuses to believe it.

Realizing that they were too harsh on Chris, Brian and Stewie attend the homecoming dance to support him as Principal Shepherd introduces him as the prom king. However, when Shepard introduces the Homecoming Queen, which turns out to be a memorial to a girl who died in a car accident, it dawns on Chris that they merely elected him out of pity because they thought he was mentally challenged just like his father. He angrily lashes out as his classmates for voting for him without even knowing him just to make themselves feel better, and points out that the girl was on PCP the night of her death. Outside the school, Chris reconciles with Stewie and Brian, having learned that he does not need pity, just support from his family and friends.

Meanwhile, at the Drunken Clam, while Cleveland goes to the bathroom, Peter, Joe, and Quagmire head out, leaving Cleveland to pay the bill for the boys. Cleveland complains to Jerome, and they bond over more drinks. Later, Cleveland ditches his friends to hang out with Jerome, surprising them. Wanting to get Cleveland back, they decide to try and win him back through antics such as dancing foolishly on his lawn, only to give up and play Tecmo Super Bowl on Peter's Nintendo Entertainment System. they address the idea that Cleveland may be hanging out with Jerome because they are both black people. They head to the Brown house dressed like famous black people to win Cleveland back, but he reveals that he is still angry about the unsettled bar tab he was stuck with and feels Jerome is a better friend. That night, Cleveland tells Jerome of the guys' theory and learns that there is some truth behind it, as Jerome personally considers Cleveland boring but feels a connection to him because of their shared race nonetheless. Cleveland reconciles with his friends at the Griffins' house and plays Double Dribble with Peter on his NES.

== Reception ==
The episode received an audience of 2.65 million, making it the second-most watched show on Fox that night behind The Simpsons.

=== Controversy ===
Fox received complaints after the original video of the Double Dribble gameplay was used in the episode, from which the video of YouTube content creator 'sw1tched's channel was taken down due to a copyright claim. Fox later released a public statement that the copyright claim had been made by a programmed bot that looks for any possible stolen Family Guy clips, and that Fox slapped the copyright claim unwittingly. Seth MacFarlane also apologized for the incident on Twitter, saying that he was out of the country and was unable to get the issue resolved sooner. The original video has since been restored.
