= McStroke =

- Family Guy episode
- Episode no.: Season 6 Episode 8
- Directed by: Brian Iles
- Written by: Wellesley Wild
- Production code: 5ACX19
- Original air date: January 13, 2008

Guest appearances
- Max Burkholder as Little Kid; Denis Martel as Italian clerk; Camille Guaty as Gina; Lisa Wilhoit as Connie D'Amico; Ricardo Montalbán as Bull (Mr. Cow)

Episode chronology
← Previous "Peter's Daughter"	Next → "Back to the Woods"
- Family Guy season 6

"McStroke" is the eighth episode of season six of the animated comedy series Family Guy. It originally aired on Fox in the United States on January 13, 2008. The episode follows Peter as he saves the life of a fast-food restaurant owner who gives him a lifetime supply of free hamburgers as a reward. After eating 30 hamburgers in a row, Peter suffers a massive stroke and tries to take revenge on the restaurant.

The episode was written by Wellesley Wild and it was directed by Brian Iles. This is one of the episodes that did not have show creator Seth MacFarlane's work in post-production because he was participating in the Writers Guild of America strike. The episode guest starred Max Burkholder, Denis Martel, and Ricardo Montalbán. Recurring voice actors Alex Breckenridge, Phil LaMarr, Ralph Garman, Mark Hentemann, Danny Smith, Alec Sulkin, Lisa Wilhoit, and John Viener also made appearances. It received mixed reviews from critics.

== Plot ==
Peter starts collecting Cleveland's mail (he calls it "black guy mail") while the latter is out of town. After looking through one of Cleveland's magazines devoted to mustaches, Peter decides to grow one. It quickly becomes his most prized possession, and he pretends that it gives him special abilities; for instance, convinced he can now speak Italian, he angers an Italian deli owner with his mock Italian gibberish.

Peter and Brian walk past McBurgertown and it is on fire. Firefighters notice Peter's mustache and give him a fire hose. Peter is reluctant to risk injury rescuing a man trapped in the building, but rationalizes "with great mustache comes great responsibility". He rescues the manager from the fire, but is devastated that his mustache has been burned off. The manager later visits the Griffins to thank Peter with a lifetime supply of hamburgers. At the grand re-opening, Peter drowns his sense of loss with 30 hamburgers, causing a stroke that paralyzes the left half of his body. Unhappy about the pace of his recovery, Peter walks into a stem cell research center; he is cured of his stroke damage in only five minutes. Peter then tries to sue McBurgertown for causing his stroke. Brian points out that it was Peter's own fault for overindulging. Peter loses the trial because the company has more lawyers, he offered the judge a cheap bribe, and because he has no evidence that McBurgertown was at fault.

Still wanting revenge, Peter drags Brian to the corporate headquarters. Peter claims that he and Brian are wealthy Asian businessmen and asks for a tour. The company grants his request. Looking for evidence of wrongdoing that he can use, Peter asks about a room labeled "restricted". The tour guide says that room is off-limits, then excuses himself for a 30-minute bathroom break. Peter breaks his word that he would not go in the room, and finds that it is a slaughterhouse. Peter and Brian befriend a bull that is genetically engineered and capable of human speech, who eloquently describes the horrors the company has inflicted. Realizing that this is the evidence that Peter needs to take down McBurgertown, Brian offers a deal to set Mr. Cow free in exchange for his help exposing McBurgertown. Realizing that Peter and Brian broke their promise, the tour guide sends two security men after them. Fleeing the building in a madcap chase set to The Monkees' "Pleasant Valley Sunday", Mr. Cow reveals McBurgertown's practices and the bad health effects of its food to the media. The company suffers a blow from which it might not recover, and Mr. Cow thanks Peter for helping out.

In the B story, Stewie and Brian wager that Stewie can disguise himself as a high schooler and become the most popular kid in less than a week. Using the name "Zac Sawyer", Stewie easily wins over Connie D'Amico and her clique, winning the bet. Connie and "Zac" drive to Anal Point to have sex, but Connie laughs at the size of his penis and drives off. The next day at school, Stewie is ostracized by everyone for his "baby penis". Stewie concedes defeat and asks Connie for one last kiss. When Connie's eyes are closed, Stewie takes off his clothes and kisses her. He loudly accuses her as a pedophile and she is arrested immediately by police.

== Production ==
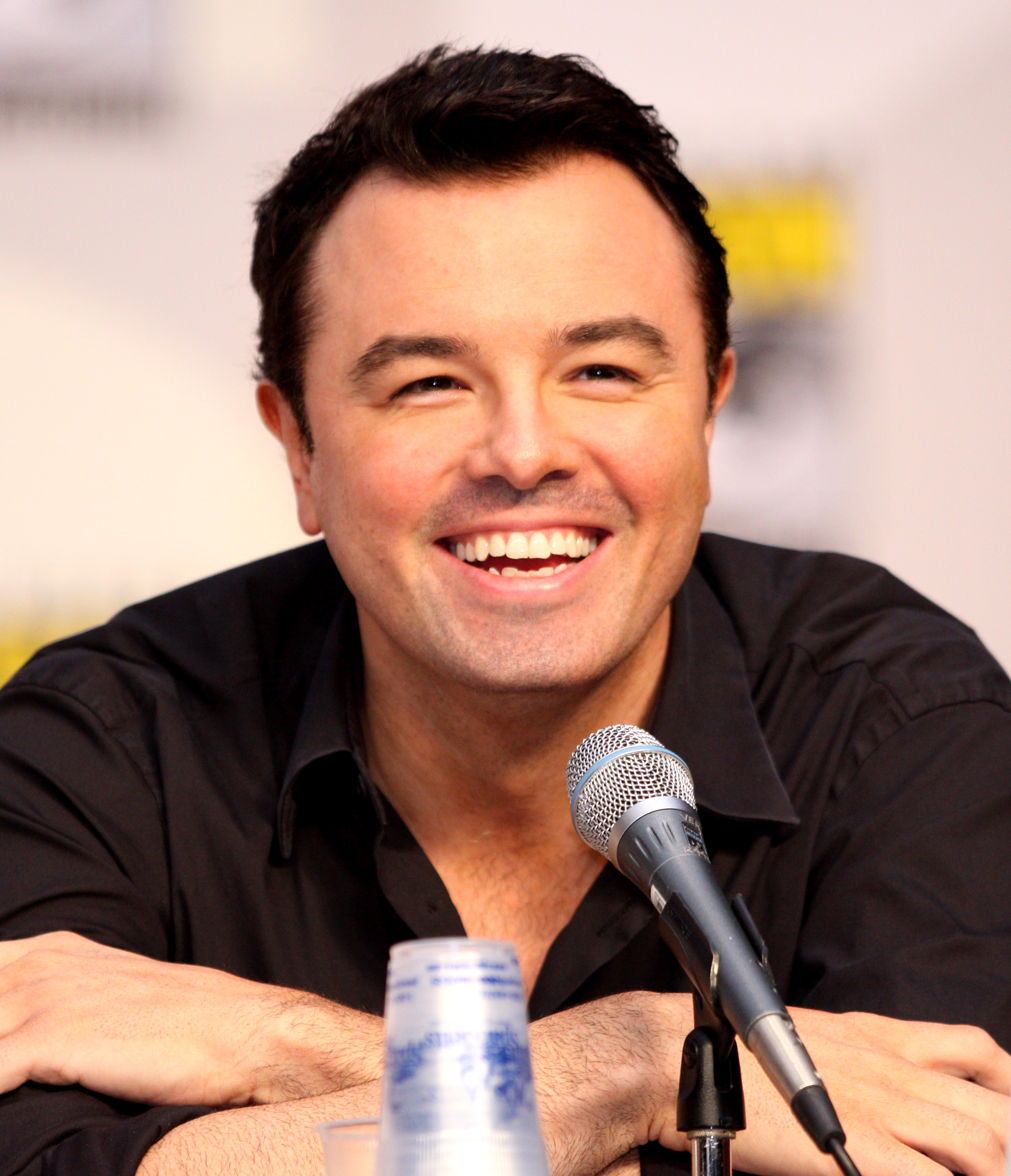
Seth MacFarlane did not participate in the post-production of the episode.

The episode was written by Wellesley Wild, who has been with the show since its fourth season. It was directed by Brian Iles, who would direct the episode "Back to the Woods" later this season. Series regulars Peter Shin and James Purdun acted as supervising directors for the episode.

This is one of the episodes of Family Guy that was released after the show's creator, Seth MacFarlane, joined the Writers Guild of America strike. MacFarlane participated in the writing process and did record the voices of the characters that he normally plays for the episode, but he did not approve or participate in any post-production done to the episode.

In addition to the regular cast, actors Camille Guaty, Denis Martel, Ted McGinley and Ricardo Montalbán guest starred in the episode (Montalbán would one year later guest star in the episode "Moon Over Isla Island" on MacFarlane's other show, American Dad). Recurring voice actors Alex Breckenridge, Phil LaMarr, Ralph Garman, writer Mark Hentemann, writer Danny Smith, writer Alec Sulkin, Lisa Wilhoit and writer John Viener made minor appearances in the episode.

The episode was to feature a gag during the sequence wherein Stewie seduces Connie D’Amico at “Anal Point” wherein two men explicitly named as Matt and Trey bicker in a neighboring car whilst the latter performs anal sex on the former, in response to the South Park episode Cartoon Wars, which lampooned the Family writing staff, though this was cut from the final episode.

== Cultural references ==
The episode featured various references to the popular culture. In a scene, the Monopoly man is shown, from the board game Monopoly, in a prison that is reminiscent of The Shawshank Redemption. Brian and Stewie are watching the television drama, One Tree Hill. Singer and actor Will Smith is shown rapping positive and kid-friendly lyrics. When Peter has his mustache, he enters an Italian deli and assumes that he can speak Italian because of his mustache. Peter sings R.E.M.'s song "It's the End of the World as We Know It (And I Feel Fine)". Peter's paralysis is cured by stem cell experiments. Peter tries to find good comedy material for Robin Williams.

McBurgertown is a parody of worldwide fast-food company McDonald's and similar fast-food multinational chains. The slaughterhouse is referred to as "Dacow" which is a reference to the concentration camp of Dachau. Bob Dylan's song "Hurricane" is played in the episode. There is a musical chase sequence through multiple doors and a hallway, inspired by late 1960s Saturday morning cartoons like The Archies and Scooby-Doo, backed by the 1967 song "Pleasant Valley Sunday" by The Monkees. J. Wellington Wimpy (from the comic strip Popeye) makes a cameo appearance (as an in-gag to both his drooping facial features and affinity for hamburgers).

== Critical reception ==
The episode received mixed reviews. Ahsan Haque of IGN praised the episode, saying that it "turns out to be much more entertaining than one would expect" and grading it 8.8 out of 10. Robert Pierson from the TV Critic gave the episode a mixed review, he stated that "the jokes are pretty good, and although the stories are badly written, they are not overly annoying", he ended his review by giving the episode a 46 out of 100.

In contrast, Brad Trechak of TV Squad wrote that there were "hints of really good ideas in the episode but those were superseded by some hack writing and poorly executed material" and blamed the WGA strike for the episode's perceived poor quality. Genevieve Koski of The A.V. Club called the episode "very haphazard" and wrote that there were only "a couple of solid gags sprinkled throughout". She graded "McStroke" C−.

The Parents Television Council, a frequent critic of the show, condemned it as the "Worst TV Show of the Week" for January 25, 2008, their central point of criticism concerned the subplot involving Stewie and Connie D'Amico.

Tom Eames of entertainment website Digital Spy placed the episode at number eleven on his listing of the best Family Guy episodes in order of "yukyukyuks" and noted that the show "somehow made strokes funny". He described the episode as "A farce of an episode, but in a good way."
