= Pilling Them Softly =

- Family Guy episode
- Episode no.: Season 14; Episode 1
- Directed by: Jerry Langford
- Written by: Hayes Davenport
- Production code: CACX17
- Original air date: September 27, 2015

Episode chronology
← Previous "Take My Wife"	Next → "Papa Has a Rollin' Son"
- Family Guy season 14

"Pilling Them Softly" is the first episode of the fourteenth season of the animated sitcom Family Guy, and the 250th episode overall. It aired on Fox in the United States on September 27, 2015, and was written by Hayes Davenport and directed by Jerry Langford. The title is a play on the 2012 film Killing Them Softly.

== Plot ==
Lois is informed by Stewie's teacher, Miss Tammy, that he has an attention problem. She takes him to Dr. Hartman, who promptly gives him a prescription to treat ADHD. When he takes the pills, he enters a state of stupor. Brian is initially upset about this, but when Meg mentions the creative benefits of it, he decides to try it himself, and becomes endlessly hyperactive in contrast to Stewie's unnatural calmness. In a creative frenzy, Brian conceives a premise for a multimedia science fantasy franchise called Space Shire 7; to flesh out the idea, he writes a 2000-page treatment and creates a diorama of the universe and characters.

Meanwhile, at the Drunken Clam, Jerome shows samples of some Korean food to Peter, Quagmire, Cleveland, and Joe. Quagmire claims that he can cook better, and prepares a meal for all of his neighbors; Lois decides that he should have his own cooking show. Channel 5's producer Carson agrees to hire him, but only if Peter joins him due to his silliness; Quagmire agrees to the terms. During the production of "Quagmire's Kitchen", Peter's antics (including repeat cinnamon challenges) irk Quagmire until he finally fires him. Carson decides to give Peter his own show, which proves more popular due to his bizarre behavior. When Quagmire calls it an insult to cooking, Carson decides to have them compete in an Iron Chef America-style cook-off.

Brian and Stewie travel to Hartford, Connecticut, where they meet George R. R. Martin at a fan convention and pitch Space Shire 7, but Martin dismisses it, deeming the concept to be clichéd and clearly created under the influence of drugs. Ultimately, they both decide that they no longer need the pills and return home. When they leave, another Martin shows up on a motor scooter and claims that the other George R. R. Martin, who is passionately kissing a young fan, is an impostor.

On the day of the cook-off, Joe helps Quagmire with the competition as Cleveland assists Peter with it. The assigned secret ingredient for their dishes is butter. During a montage, Joe and Quagmire focus on cooking while Cleveland and Peter play around. Joe eventually destroys Quagmire's cooking supplies, sealing his defeat. Peter, seeing this, has a sudden change of heart and devours his meal for Quagmire to achieve victory. Quagmire is touched by Peter's sacrifice, but decides to forgo the show to preserve their good will toward each other. Peter and Quagmire decide to end the production of their cooking shows in the same way that Food Network had ended the production of Paula Deen's cooking show. Before the word in question can be said, it cuts to the Drunken Clam as an angry Cleveland scolds Peter and Quagmire for not just quitting the show.

== Reception ==
The episode received an audience of 2.87 million, making it the fourth-most watched show on Fox that night behind the Brooklyn Nine-Nine episode "New Captain", The Last Man on Earth episode "Is There Anybody Out There?" and The Simpsons episode "Every Man's Dream" and beating the Bob's Burgers episode "Sliding Bobs". Jesse Schedeen of IGN gave the episode a 7.9 out of 10, saying "While it may not rank among the show's best, "Pilling Them Softly" wasn't a bad way to kick off Family Guy's 14th season. Both halves of the episode provided a steady (if not heavy) level of humor, with solid spoofs of George R.R Martin and Iron Chef and even offering up a little social commentary to boot. As much as this show has struggled creatively in the last couple of years, this is a promising start to the new season."

Series creator Seth MacFarlane won the Primetime Emmy Award for Outstanding Character Voice-Over Performance for his work on this episode.
