= A Shot in the Dark (Family Guy) =

- Family Guy episode
- Episode no.: Season 14; Episode 9
- Directed by: Brian Iles
- Written by: Mike Desilets
- Production code: DACX05
- Original air date: December 13, 2015

Guest appearance
- Cary Elwes

Episode chronology
← Previous "Brokeback Swanson"	Next → "Candy, Quahog Marshmallow"
- Family Guy season 14

"A Shot in the Dark" is the ninth episode of the fourteenth season of the animated sitcom Family Guy, and the 258th episode overall. It aired on Fox in the United States on December 13, 2015, and is written by Mike Desilets and directed by Brian Iles. This episode was originally produced under the title "Stand Your Brown", a play on the stand-your-ground law and Cleveland's last name Brown.

In the episode inspired from the 2012 controversial death of Trayvon Martin, Peter joins a neighborhood watch group and is accused of being racist after shooting Cleveland Jr., an unarmed black teenager, in self defense.

It was originally set to air on November 15, 2015, but was replaced by "Peter's Sister" following the November 2015 Paris attacks. The second planned airing was supposed to be December 6, 2015, but it was again replaced, this time by "Brokeback Swanson" following the 2015 San Bernardino shooting.

== Plot ==
Peter brings the Griffin family couch outside so that he, Quagmire, Cleveland, and Joe take advantage of it to do their drinking. But when it is stolen (when it was probably just mistaken for trash as Brian points out), they decide to form a neighborhood watch. Peter manages to get the guys guns to use; when he spots a shadowy figure trying to get into Cleveland's house via the window, he shoots him in the arm, only to discover that he is Cleveland Jr.

At the hospital, Peter meets the Browns to apologize, but Cleveland and Donna refuse to forgive him and call him a racist; Cleveland Jr. explains that he didn't hear Peter approaching due to listening to music on a headset and that he was using the window to avoid letting out too much air conditioning through the front door. Although Joe explains that the police have deemed the shooting an accident, an offended Cleveland refuses to have anything further to do with Peter. Later at the Drunken Clam, Peter, Quagmire, and Joe see Cleveland on Tom Tucker's show, where he is trying to convince the Quahog residents that Peter's actions were a hate crime. The town starts acting angrily towards the Griffins, so Peter sets out to prove that he isn't racist. He tries to take Cleveland a drink and cigars, but his clumsiness results in Cleveland's house catching on fire, and as a crowd gathers, Peter's screams for the family to get out of the burning house are misconstrued as threats. An angry crowd later forms outside of the Griffins' house, where Joe and his fellow police officers are forced to arrest Peter on orders of his supervisors to pacify the black community.

While incarcerated, Peter is visited by his father-in-law Carter, who offers his help in bailing him out as well as providing a distraction for the community with the help of his lawyer. In court, the lawyer uses lyrics from Jay-Z's "Threat" and Cleveland Jr's. last name being the same as Chris Brown's to suggest that Cleveland Jr. is a criminal, despite Peter's objections. Following the trial, in which Peter is found innocent, an outraged Cleveland confronts Peter and declares that their friendship is over.

As the mob turns on Cleveland and his family outside of their home, Peter intercedes and admits to shooting Cleveland Jr., stating that he didn't do it because of the color of his skin, but due to him being scared and doing something stupid, and he should be held accountable for his actions. As Joe once again attempts to arrest Peter, Cleveland, touched by Peter finally taking responsibility for his actions, falsely claims to have shot Cleveland Jr. himself, causing the crowd to flee in disinterest in black-on-black crime. He admits that he realizes Peter only shot Cleveland Jr. due to his stupidity, not by being racist and finally forgives him, to which then Peter apologizes to Cleveland Jr. However, Peter is left in shock after Cleveland Jr. threatens him, claims he is joking, then immediately returns to an aggressive tone to suggest that he may not be before happily saying bye and skipping away.

== Reception ==
The episode received an audience of 3.74 million, making it the third-most watched show on Fox that night behind the Brooklyn Nine-Nine episode "Yippie Kayak" and The Simpsons episode "Barthood". Lisa Basic of TV Fanatic gave the episode 2/5 stars.
