= Josh Rogin =

American journalist

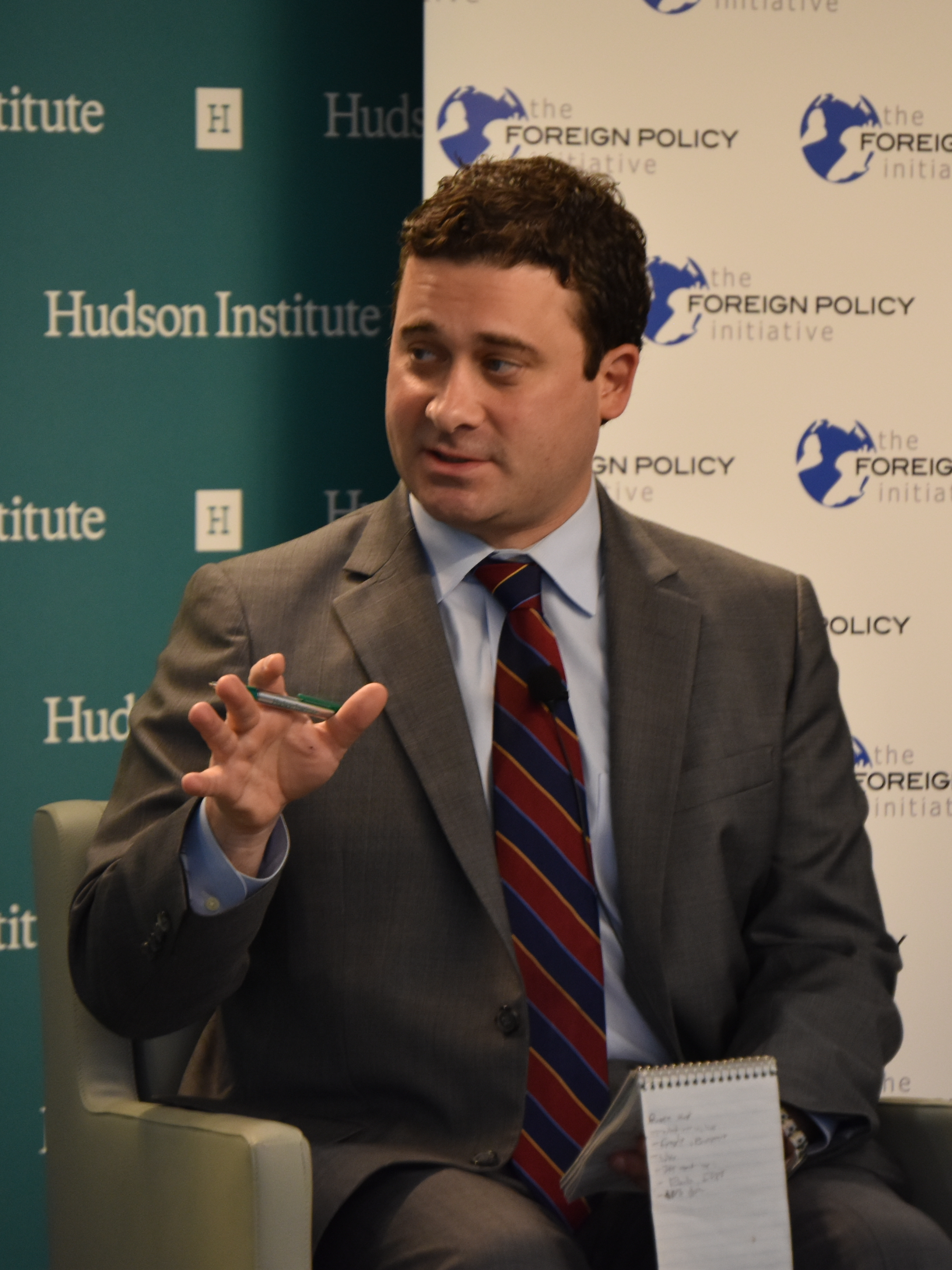
- Born: 1978 or 1979 (age 47–48)
- Education: George Washington University (BA)
- Occupation: Journalist
- Spouse: Ali Weinberg
- Children: 1
- Family: Max Weinberg (father-in-law); Jay Weinberg (brother-in-law)

Josh Rogin is an American journalist currently serving as a foreign policy columnist for the Global Opinions section of The Washington Post and a political analyst for CNN. He is author of the book Chaos Under Heaven: Trump, Xi, and the Battle for the 21st Century.

== Biography ==
Rogin is Jewish and was raised in Bensalem, Pennsylvania in the suburbs of Philadelphia. He graduated with a B.A. in international affairs from the George Washington University's Elliott School of International Affairs.
Sophia University After graduation, he worked as a journalist covering foreign policy and national security for Newsweek, The Daily Beast, Foreign Policy, Bloomberg View, The Washington Post, Federal Computer Week, Asahi Shimbun of Japan, and Congressional Quarterly. He is currently a foreign policy columnist for The Washington Post's Global Opinions section and a political analyst for CNN.

He is author of the book, Chaos Under Heaven: Trump, Xi, and the Battle for the 21st Century, published in March 2021.

Rogin describes his politics as "neoliberal with a constructivist streak."

== Awards ==
Rogin was a 2008-2009 National Press Foundation's Paul Miller Washington Reporting Fellow and a 2009 military reporting fellow with the Knight Center for Specialized Journalism. In 2011, Rogin was a finalist for the Livingston Award for Young Journalists and the 2011 recipient of the Interaction Award for Excellence in International Reporting.

== Wuhan lab theory ==
In April 2020, Rogin published a column about diplomatic cables written by US diplomats in 2018 which he claimed reported safety and staffing concerns the diplomats had expressed after three visits in late 2017 and early 2018 to the Wuhan Institute of Virology. The cables reported that the WIV scientists claimed they did not have proper staffing and training to safely operate the institute's Biosafety Level 4 lab. The US diplomats also warned that the institute was performing risky research on bat coronaviruses in their labs. The cables were seen by some US officials to support a hypothesis that the Wuhan Institute of Virology's research may have resulted in a lab accident that caused the outbreak of the COVID-19 pandemic.

The publicly available diplomatic cables only mentions safety regarding concerns of limited productivity. Virologist Dr Angela Rasmussen claims Rogin misrepresented the statements concerning safety in the diplomatic cables.

== Incidents ==
In 2014, Rogin was credited with recording and revealing statements made in a private meeting of the Trilateral Commission by US Secretary of State John Kerry, who posited that Israel could become an "apartheid state." Invitees had all previously agreed that they would not record or report on speakers' remarks without permission. Rogin posted an article on The Daily Beast, which forced Kerry to issue a letter of apology to Jewish and Israeli leaders. Rogin originally stated that he received the information from an attendee's recording. He later admitted that he made the recording himself. Rogin ultimately defended himself by stating he was not an invitee and therefore was not bound by the off the record agreement.

Rogin was physically assaulted in 2013 by comedian Dan Nainan, after tweeting disparagingly about Nainan's standup performance at a charity comedy event at the DC Improv. Nainan saw Rogin's tweets after his set, approached Rogin in the back of the club, and punched him twice in the face in front of several witnesses. Nainan was arrested and later pleaded guilty to assault.

== Personal life ==
In 2016, he married PBS Newshour foreign affairs producer Ali Weinberg (daughter of longtime Bruce Springsteen drummer Max Weinberg and sister of Slipknot drummer Jay Weinberg) in a Jewish ceremony in Washington D.C.
