= Family Guy season 25 =

Episode list for a season of an animated television series

Family Guy
- Season 25
- Showrunners: Seth MacFarlane; Alec Sulkin; Richard Appel; Steve Callaghan; Danny Smith; Kara Vallow; Mark Hentemann; Tom Devanney; Patrick Meighan; Alex Carter
- Starring: Seth MacFarlane; Alex Borstein; Seth Green; Mila Kunis; Mike Henry; Patrick Warburton; Arif Zahir
- No. of episodes: 1 (Hulu); 1 (total)

Release
- Original network: Fox; Hulu (specials)
- Original release: October 5, 2026

Season chronology
- ← Previous; Season 24

The twenty-fifth season of the American animated television series Family Guy premiered on October 5, 2026. Like the previous two seasons, it will be preceded by two holiday specials airing exclusively on Hulu, with a Halloween special premiering on October 5, 2026 and a Christmas special on November 30, 2026, while the rest of the season will premiere in early 2027 on Fox as part of its Animation Domination programming block.

The series follows the dysfunctional Griffin family, consisting of father Peter, mother Lois, daughter Meg, son Chris, baby Stewie, and the family dog Brian, all of whom reside in their hometown of Quahog, a fictional city in the U.S. state of Rhode Island. The show features the voices of series creator Seth MacFarlane, Alex Borstein, Seth Green, and Mila Kunis in the roles of the Griffin family.

Season twenty-five would start the run of the twenty-fourth production season, which is executive produced by Seth MacFarlane, Alec Sulkin, Richard Appel, Steve Callaghan, Danny Smith, Kara Vallow, Mark Hentemann, Tom Devanney, Patrick Meighan, and Alex Carter. Sulkin and Appel returned as the series' showrunners. Like every season, there will be hiatus breaks in between episodes.

== Voice cast and characters ==
- Seth MacFarlane as Peter Griffin, Brian Griffin, Stewie Griffin
- Alex Borstein as Lois Griffin
- Seth Green as Chris Griffin
- Mila Kunis as Meg Griffin
- Mike Henry as Bruce, Herbert, Consuela
- Patrick Warburton as Joe Swanson
- Arif Zahir as Cleveland Brown

=== Supporting cast ===
- Carlos Alazraqui as TBD
- Steve Callaghan as TBD
- Charlet Chung as TBD
- Sanaa Lathan as TBD
- Kieran Culkin as The Devil
- Ralph Garman as TBD
- Mark Hentemann as TBD
- Artie Johann as TBD
- Sanaa Lathan as Donna Tubbs
- Rachael MacFarlane as Miss Tammy
- Max Mittelman as TBD
- Maggie Mull as TBD
- Allison Munn as TBD
- Chris Regan as TBD
- Mel Rodriguez as TBD
- Ignacio Serricchio as TBD
- Julius Sharpe as TBD
- Danny Smith as TBD
- Josh Robert Thompson as TBD
- Paul F. Tompkins as TBD
- John Viener as TBD
- Casey Wilson as TBD

== Episodes ==
No. overall	No. in season	Title	Directed by	Written by	Original release date	Prod. code	U.S. viewers (millions)
462	–	"Happy Hell-o-ween"	Joe Vaux	Travis Bowe	October 5, 2026	RACX16	N/A
Stewie is invited to a Halloween masquerade ball aboard a yacht, and takes Brian as his guest. Before they can board, the two witness a drowning swimmer and deliberate whether to rescue him at the risk of damaging their tuxedos, before ultimately deciding to ignore him, only to get hit by an SUV. Waking up dead, they are told by The Devil (Kieran Culkin) that they are in hell for all the trouble they've caused over the years. After being shown around, they grow tired of the living conditions and unionize their fellow deceased to turn things around. The annoyed Devil steps down and hands his position to Stewie and Brian, who try to cater to everyone's needs but find the job overwhelming. They try to find The Devil, who reveals that he never wanted his job, which became more administrative and less fun over time. Stewie reminds him about his true purpose in keeping the world from falling into anarchy, and The Devil returns to his post. Stewie and Brian are given another chance at life and still decide not to rescue the swimmer, but this time look both ways to avoid the SUV.
463	–	"The Peter Clause"	TBA	Artie Johann	November 30, 2026	RACX17	N/A

== Production ==
On April 2, 2025, Family Guy was renewed for a further four seasons, taking the number of seasons up to twenty-seven.
