= The Splendid Source =

- Family Guy episode
- Episode no.: Season 8 Episode 19
- Directed by: Brian Iles
- Written by: Mark Hentemann
- Based on: "The Splendid Source" by Richard Matheson
- Production code: 7ACX17
- Original air date: May 16, 2010

Guest appearances
- Marc Alaimo as the Dean of the Secret Order of Dirty Joke Writers; Gary Cole as Principal Shepherd; Ioan Gruffudd as John Payne; Sanaa Lathan as Donna Tubbs; David Lynch as Gus the Bartender; Kevin Michael Richardson as Cleveland Brown, Jr.; Wally Wingert as Wally

Episode chronology
← Previous "Quagmire's Dad"	Next → "Something, Something, Something, Dark Side"
- Family Guy season 8

"The Splendid Source" is the 19th episode of the eighth season of the animated comedy series Family Guy. Directed by Brian Iles and written by Mark Hentemann, the episode originally aired on Fox in the United States on May 16, 2010. The episode follows Peter, Joe and Quagmire as they set out on a journey to find the ultimate source of all the world's dirty jokes. Along the way, the group is reunited with their old friend, Cleveland Brown, while traveling through Stoolbend, Virginia. Their journey becomes much more difficult than expected when they are kidnapped and taken to a remote island. There, they discover a secret society of the world's greatest geniuses at the center of all the world's dirty jokes. The plot is based on a short story of the same name written by Richard Matheson and first published in the May 1956 edition of Playboy magazine.

The episode was a follow-up to the departure of main character Cleveland Brown, who was removed from Family Guy to become the center of the spin-off The Cleveland Show. Former series writer and cast member Mike Henry returned to the series to provide the voice of Cleveland. The episode also featured the first official crossover between Family Guy and The Cleveland Show, and included cameo appearances by several of The Cleveland Show's main characters. The episode was first announced at the 2009 San Diego Comic-Con.

Critical response to the episode was favorable. Reviewers praised the episode for the originality of its premise and its under-reliance on cultural references, but criticized the plot. According to Nielsen ratings, it was viewed in 7.59 million homes in its original airing. The episode featured guest performances by Marc Alaimo, Gary Cole, Ioan Gruffudd, Sanaa Lathan, David Lynch, Kevin Michael Richardson and Wally Wingert, along with several recurring guest voice actors for the series. "The Splendid Source" was released on DVD along with ten other episodes from the season on December 13, 2011.

== Plot ==
As Peter and Lois discuss a family trip to Maine, Chris tells his parents that he has been suspended from school for telling an inappropriate joke to his classmates. Assuring Principal Shepherd it will never happen again, Chris reveals that he learned the joke from Quagmire.

At the Drunken Clam, Peter asks Quagmire to tell him the joke, which he finds so funny that he involuntarily defecates in his pants, much to his embarrassment. Realizing this, Joe and Quagmire play a series of pranks on him, making him soil himself by repeating the punchline to him (even defecating in bed, infuriating Lois, after being told the joke in a dream), which Peter eventually thwarts by wearing Quagmire's pants. Peter asks Quagmire where he heard the dirty joke in the first place, and Quagmire reveals that he heard it from Bruce.

Locating Bruce at his job at the bowling alley, the group discovers that the joke has been transmitted by a large chain of people including Consuela, Dr. Hartman, Mayor Adam West, Angela, Opie, Herbert, Tom Tucker, Bender from Futurama, Al Harrington, and REO Speedwagon frontman Kevin Cronin who has also been tracing the source of the joke and saved them some stops with one of their previous stops involving a Virginia bartender.

The Griffins, the Swansons, and Quagmire prepare for the road trip, ostensibly for their vacation in Maine. Quagmire distracts Bonnie and Lois into telling stories about childbirth as Peter alters course to Virginia instead. The group arrives at a bar in Stoolbend, Virginia. Arriving at the Broken Stool, the guys learn from Gus that he heard the joke from Cleveland who was nearby. Peter asks Cleveland where he first heard the joke, and Cleveland reveals that a Washington, D.C., bellhop named Sal Russo told it to him. The group sets out for D.C. with Cleveland in tow.

They are attacked by a black car, whose occupants fire guns at them to prevent them from learning the joke's origin. Joe shoots out one of the car's tires, causing it to spin out of control and crash onto its roof. The Quahog group arrive at a Washington hotel and locate Sal, who is reluctant to reveal the source of the joke. He races away on a handcart through Washington. Losing track of Sal, they are soon captured by several men in black suits who pistol-whip them until they are unconscious.

Kidnapped and thrown on a plane, they land on a remote island. They are led by the men in suits through a jungle wilderness to a large stone temple. The Dean of the Secret Order of Dirty Joke Writers appears from the shadows and leads the group into a large library, where the world's greatest geniuses study. The Dean explains that many of the world's greatest geniuses have come together to create dirty jokes and tailor jokes to where the need is greatest. The Dean takes them into a dark room. He reveals that they will not be permitted to leave the island now that they know about the network of joke distribution agents, like the bellhop. They are locked in a jail cell. As a diversion, Peter stabs Cleveland with a pencil. When the guard opens the door to investigate, the prisoners escape. They are recaptured by the Dean and his armed guards immediately. As they are about to be shot by the guards, an old man claims he has just written the world's greatest dirty joke and then suddenly dies. Peter snatches a small piece of paper that the man dropped as he died, containing the joke. The prisoners escape with the joke on a small plane. As they fly over the secret enclave, it is destroyed in a fireball resulting from a burning drapery that Peter had set alight with a candle.

Quagmire bemoans that they destroyed the source of all dirty jokes, but Joe quickly realizes that Peter has the best one ever written. Peter, Joe, Cleveland and Quagmire then fly off into the sunset, after finding out the supposed greatest joke ever written is "Guess what? Chicken butt!" Peter doubts that that is really the world's greatest joke. Cleveland replies "No, this is!," and then stabs Peter with a pencil as payback and requests to be taken to Virginia.

In the final scene, Peter introduces footage of an ape scratching himself instead of a public service announcement from the March of Dimes Foundation. However, in the uncut version, he tells the entirety of Quagmire's joke to his family, then goes to change himself after soiling himself again.

== Production and development ==
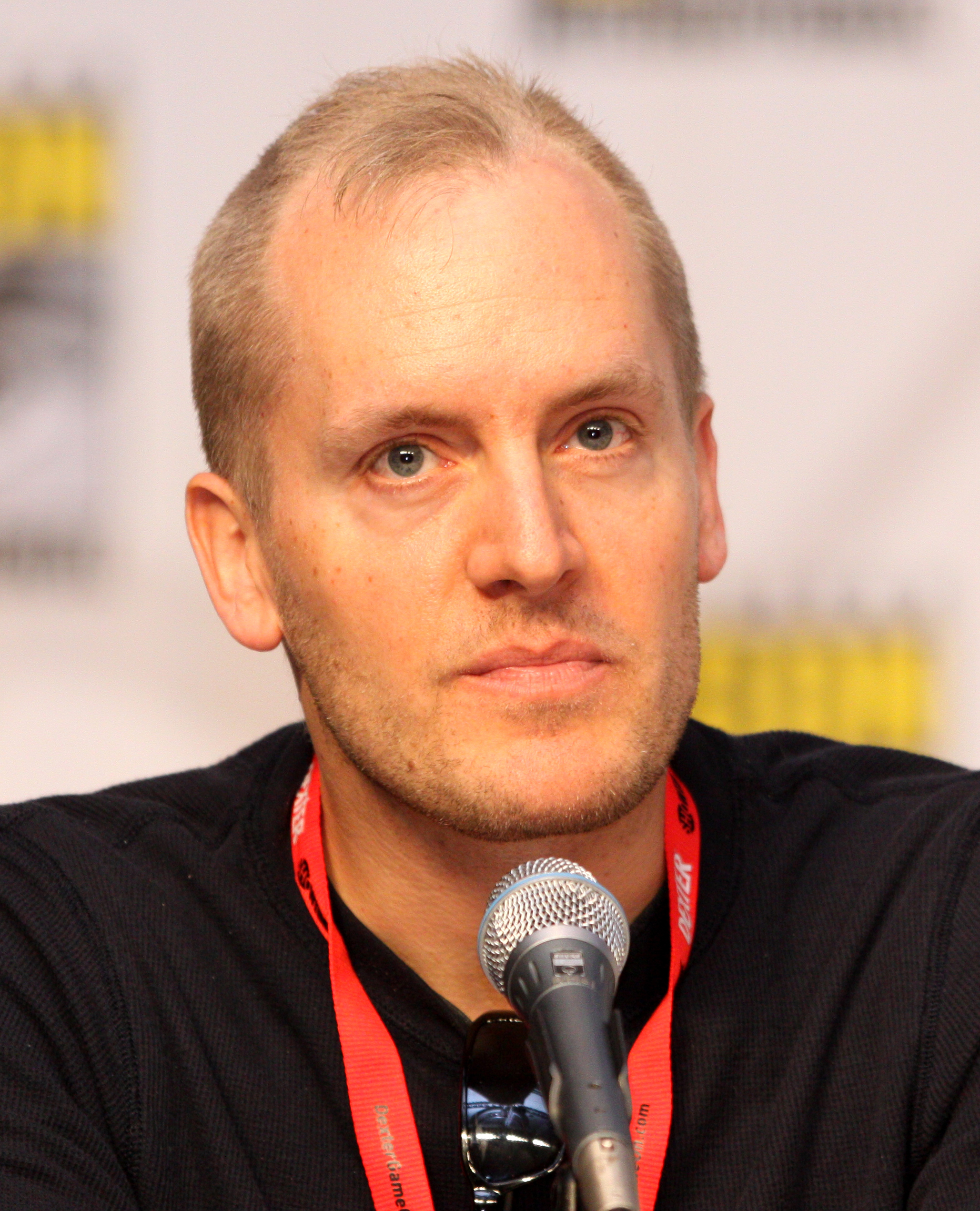
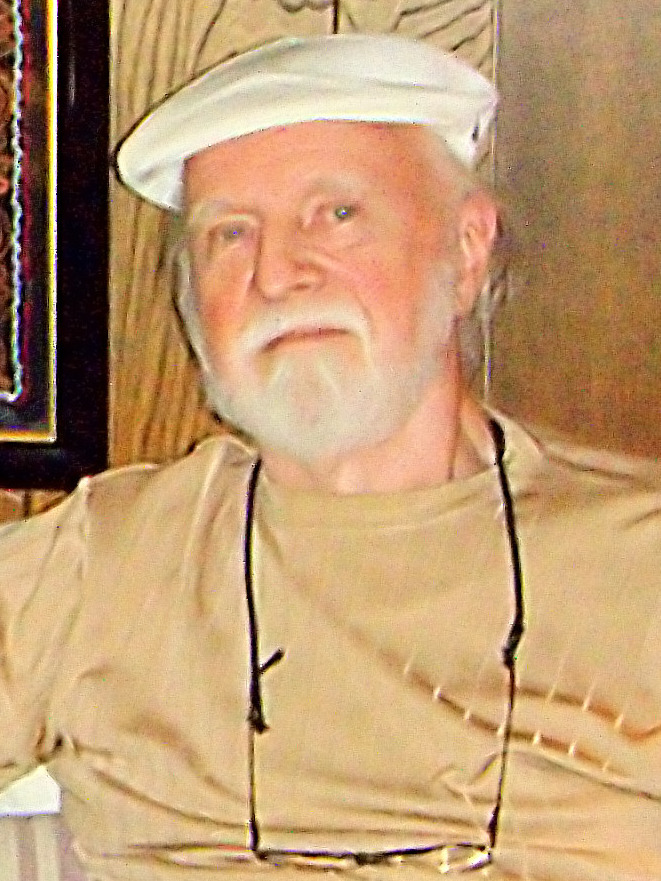
Mark Hentemann (left) wrote the episode based on a short story by Richard Matheson.

First announced at the 2009 San Diego Comic-Con in San Diego, California, on July 25, 2009, by future showrunner Mark Hentemann, the episode was directed by Brian Iles, written by Hentemann, and based on a short story by Richard Matheson before the conclusion of the eighth production season. Series regulars Peter Shin and James Purdum acted as supervising directors of the episode, with Andrew Goldberg and Alex Carter working as staff writers for the episode. The episode saw the fourth re-appearance, the first being an equally brief appearance in "Spies Reminiscent of Us", the second in "Road to the Multiverse" and the third being "Go Stewie Go", by former main cast member Mike Henry as the voice of Cleveland Brown. The actor had previously left the role on Family Guy, in order to star as the character in his own spinoff, entitled The Cleveland Show. This episode is also the first crossover with The Cleveland Show, which was created by Family Guy creator and executive producer Seth MacFarlane, voice actor Mike Henry, and former animated comedy writer Richard Appel.

"The Splendid Source", along with the eleven other episodes from Family Guy's eighth season, was released on a three-disc DVD set in the United States on December 13, 2011. The sets include brief audio commentaries by various crew and cast members for several episodes, a collection of deleted scenes and animatics, a special mini-feature which discussed the process behind animating "And Then There Were Fewer", a mini-feature entitled "The Comical Adventures of Family Guy – Brian & Stewie: The Lost Phone Call", and footage of the Family Guy panel at the 2010 San Diego Comic-Con.

In addition to the regular cast, actor Marc Alaimo, actor Gary Cole, actor Ioan Gruffudd, actress Sanaa Lathan, film director David Lynch, voice actor Kevin Michael Richardson and voice actor Wally Wingert guest starred in the episode. Recurring guest voice actors Chris Cox, actor Ralph Garman, writer Patrick Meighan, writer Danny Smith, writer Alec Sulkin, actress Jennifer Tilly, and writer John Viener also made minor appearances.

== Cultural references ==
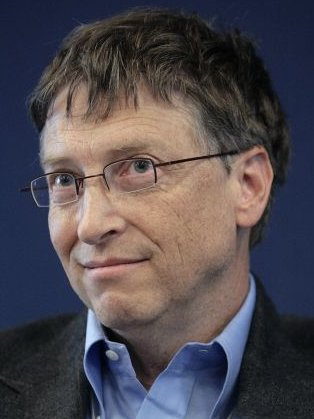
Microsoft co-founder Bill Gates was referenced in the episode.

The dirty joke told through the episode by Glenn Quagmire is taken from a joke the character Marty Funkhauser told in an episode of Curb Your Enthusiasm. In one of Quagmire's plots to have Peter soil himself, Quagmire falls asleep and encounters Freddy Krueger, the principal character from the Nightmare on Elm Street series, in a dream and hires him to go into Peter's dream, and tell the joke to him. The chain of the joke leads to the band REO Speedwagon, and the line "heard it from a friend who..." from "Take It on the Run" is played, though the scene where the lead singer appears was not voiced by any of their actual members.

While tracking down the person who first told the joke, Peter and the gang find Bender, from the Fox/Comedy Central series Futurama, who is shown telling the joke. When Peter, Joe and Quagmire get to Virginia they meet up with Cleveland and his new family from The Cleveland Show. There is a scene where Cleveland chases after the other three guys in the car, which alludes to the opening from What's Happening!!, and uses the music from the show's opening as well. When the group gets to Washington D.C., Peter, Joe, Cleveland and Quagmire see the Washington Monument, and next to it appears the Barack Obama Monument, which resembles the Washington monument, but is bigger and is colored black.

With the plane, they land on an island which has the source for every dirty joke ever made, the base looks similar to a temple-compound from the 1979 film Apocalypse Now. The base is inhabited with many great minds including Warren Buffett (who was in a deleted scene on the DVD), Bill Gates, and Stephen Hawking where they pass their time writing the world's dirty jokes. It is shown that the first dead baby joke was written in the era of Ancient Egypt.

=== Vietnam War veterans controversy ===
Screenshot from the episode, depicting the man giving a "loser" gesture

A cutaway from the episode produced controversy due to allegedly insulting Vietnam veterans. During a visit to Washington, Peter Griffin notices that a Vietnamese man is present at the Vietnam Veterans Memorial, making fun of two Vietnam veterans present at the site. During the scene, the Vietnamese man uses very incendiary language, describing the memorial as a "scoreboard" whilst performing a "loser" sign, and stating "Hey, I know that guy – I kill him! He cry like a bitch!"

== Reception ==
In a slight improvement over the previous episode, the episode was viewed in 7.59 million homes in its original airing, according to Nielsen ratings, despite airing simultaneously with the season finale of Desperate Housewives on ABC, the season finale of Survivor on CBS and Celebrity Apprentice on NBC. The episode also acquired a 3.8 rating in the 18–49 demographic, beating The Simpsons, The Cleveland Show and American Dad!, in addition to edging out all three shows in total viewership.

Reviews of the episode were mostly favorable, calling it "the only show with any sense of mystery." John Teti of The A.V. Club found the episode to have a "fantastic premise for a Peter Griffin adventure" but went on to state that he gives the episode "points for a strong first half, but I wish that the writers had pushed themselves a little harder to make this one go the distance." Ramsey Isler of IGN reiterated his own enjoyment of the premise of the episode, but went on to state, "While I can appreciate the point that good comedy does take a certain degree of wit and cleverness, this just wasn't a very satisfying end to an idea that had so much potential." In a much more positive review, Jason Hughes of TV Squad praised the underuse of cutaways, going on to note, "Reducing the reliance on cutaways seems to be the continuing trend for the series, and I think it's a good move [...] It forces smarter writing, and creates a better narrative structure."
