= Forget-Me-Not (Family Guy) =

- Family Guy episode
- Episode no.: Season 10; Episode 17
- Directed by: Brian Iles
- Written by: David A. Goodman
- Production code: 9ACX14
- Original air date: March 18, 2012

Episode chronology
← Previous "Killer Queen"	Next → "You Can't Do That on Television, Peter"
- Family Guy season 10

"Forget-Me-Not" is the seventeenth episode of the tenth season of the animated comedy series Family Guy, and the 182nd episode overall. The episode originally aired on Fox in the United States on March 18, 2012. In this episode, Peter, Joe, Quagmire and Brian wake up in the hospital and realize their memories have been erased and the city of Quahog has been deserted.

This episode was written by David A. Goodman and directed by Brian Iles.

== Plot ==
When Peter and Brian leave to play laser tag with Joe and Quagmire, Lois reminds Peter that he has agreed to spend Sundays with his family. Peter and Brian leave anyway. Peter wins at laser tag and buys a fake newspaper that says he destroyed the world. He comes home to a furious Lois. Brian defends Peter but Lois claims that Brian is just taking his side because they hang out and would never have been friends if it was not for circumstance. Despite further objections, Brian and Peter head out with Joe and Quagmire to go drinking at the Drunken Clam.

On the way they see strange lights in the road, run into them, and black out. They wake up in a hospital completely amnesiac, and as they investigate, they discover that Quahog is completely deserted except for them. Walking on, they chance upon Peter's wrecked car by the roadside. They work out that it is indeed his car and discover his address. They also assume that they are the last people on Earth.

When they find Spooner Street, Brian realizes that they live there, but they make wrong assumptions such as that Joe is a stripper (due to finding a cop's uniform) and Brian is Quagmire's dog (due to Brian defecating on Quagmires lawn). At Peter's house the other three see the fake newspaper front page Peter bought after his laser-tag win; from this they suspect that Peter is an alien who has killed the rest of the world. Joe and Quagmire search for weapons while Brian spies on Peter, but by the time Joe and Quagmire return, Brian and Peter have bonded so that Brian warns Peter and they try to escape but the others intercept them. As Joe fires toward Peter, Brian jumps in front of Peter to sacrifice himself for him. Peter picks up and cries over Brian's dead body.

Brian wakes up, startled and confused. It turns out Stewie had captured them and hooked them to a computer system simulating the world to see if Brian and Peter were just friends through circumstance, but the simulation has proved they do belong together. Then Brian notices that Stewie has attached Lois, Meg, and Bonnie to an identical system, but instead of investigating their circumstances, or even discovering each other's names, the women are fighting.

== Reception ==
In its original broadcast on March 18, 2012, "Forget-Me-Not" was watched by 5.61 million viewers and acquired a 2.8/7 rating in the 18–49 demographic, according to Nielsen ratings. Kevin McFarland of The A.V. Club gave the episode a C+, saying "I liked a lot of the throwaway lines and cutaway material packed around the central plot, but when Family Guy goes all in on one plotline without any other runners, it's a make-or-break choice. This question about Brian and Peter's owner/pet relationship didn't really need this sort of musing, as I'm still not sure this answer will make past episodes clearer, or influence their relationship going forward. It's just a statement because the show felt like it needed to make one now, and the dynamic of the show will change as needed, ultimately rendering this revelation and confirmation of Peter and Brian's friendship useless."

David A. Goodman was nominated for a Writers Guild of America Award for Outstanding Writing in Animation at the 65th Writers Guild of America Awards for his script to this episode.
