= Dan Nainan =

American comedian (born 1961)

Daniel Nainan
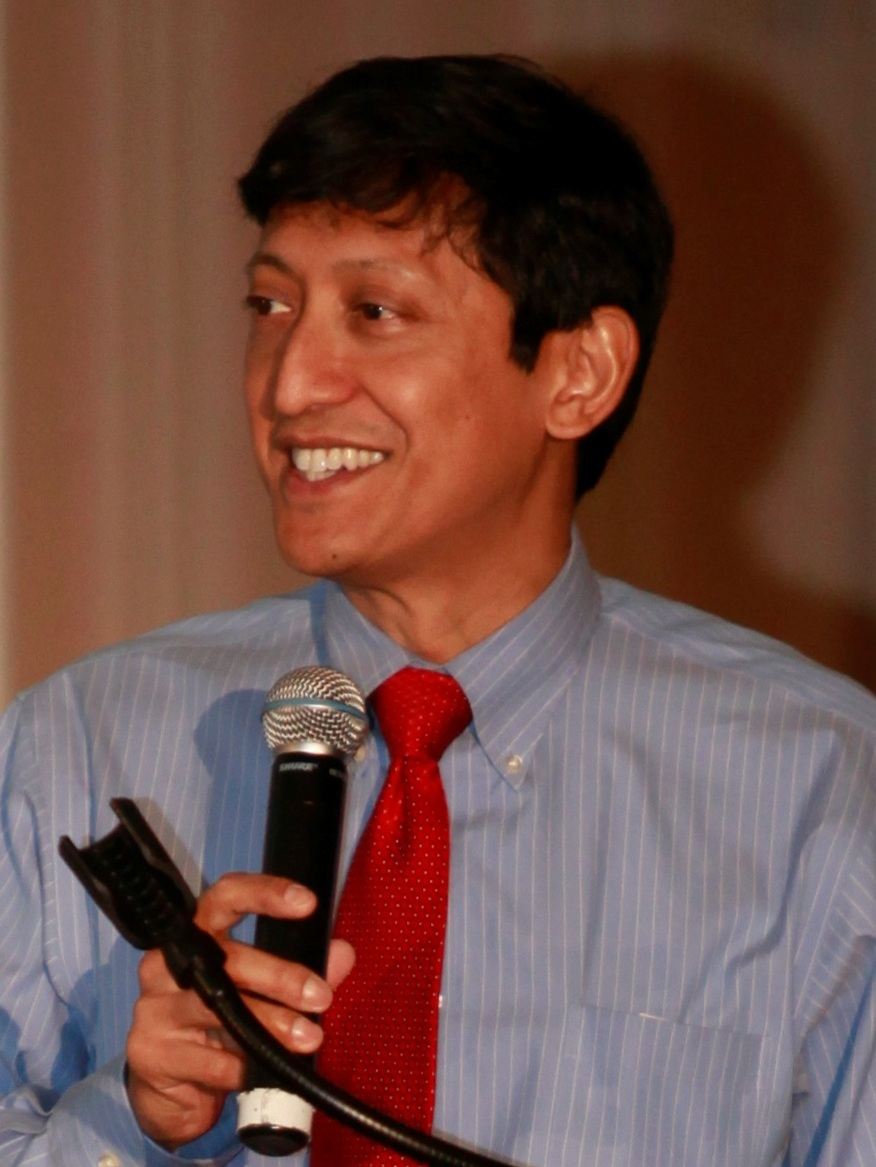
- Nainan in 2012
- Born: May 1961 (age 65)
- Other name: Dan Nainan

Daniel Nainan (born May 1961) is an American comedian. He is known for performing ethnic jokes involving his South-Asian ethnicity.

== Background ==
=== Early life ===
Daniel Nainan was born in May 1961. His father is Indian Malayali and his mother is Japanese. He majored in business at the University of Maryland.

=== Career ===
Nainan's stand-up performances usually take place at corporate events. "There's so much money to be made with corporations, weddings, senior-citizen centers," he told the Washington Post in 2010. He has also made media appearances where he presented himself as a millennial, expressing his opinions on societal issues, though he was later revealed to be older than he presented as. In one instance, he performed a stand-up session for Barack Obama.

In June 2013, Nainan told the New York Times that he had bought over a thousand Twitter followers. In September of the same year, Nainan was arrested and charged with simple assault after he punched Daily Beast journalist Josh Rogin in Washington, D.C. The incident happened after Rogin published a social media post criticizing Nainan's act. Nainan later pleaded guilty and served probation.

In 2017, the Daily Beast published an article contesting Nainan's statements that he was a millennial. According to the article, a legal document from a New York court stated that Nainan was born in May 1961. Prior to the Daily Beast's article, in 2012, Nainan had told the New York Times and the Wall Street Journal that he was 31 and 36 years old, respectively.

== Comedic style ==
Nainan's comedy is largely based on ethnic jokes. In a tour in Maryland, he started one of his sections with the joke: "You're asking yourself, 'what the hell race is this guy?' Well, my father is Indian and my mother is Japanese. Which means I get my sushi at 7-eleven." According to researcher Matthew Daube, this type of stand-up comedy has been linked since its inception in the 1950s to issues of race and ethnicity in the United States. Nainan stated that he likes to keep his comedy "clean" and avoid making vulgar jokes.
