= Damien Fahey =

American voice actor and writer (born 1980)

- Born: Damien Richard Fahey; June 1, 1980 (age 45); Longmeadow, Massachusetts, U.S.
- Occupations: Writer; voice actor; DJ; television host; comedian; drummer
- Spouse: Grasie Mercedes (m. 2013; div. 2022)
- Website: www.damienfahey.com

Damien Richard Fahey (/ˈfæhi/; born June 1, 1980) is an American writer, voice actor, DJ, television host, comedian, drummer, and former video jockey. He is known for his work on Family Guy as a voice actor, writer, and producer, and formerly working on MTV as a video jockey.

== Early life ==
Fahey was interested in radio from a young age, buying radio equipment and setting up a mock radio station in his teenage bedroom. At 15, Fahey got an internship and on-air DJ position at 94.7 WMAS in Springfield, Massachusetts.

In 1999, Fahey enrolled in Northeastern University, and majored in communications. He left Northeastern in 2002 after being hired by MTV.

== Career ==
=== Radio ===
Fahey worked for several years at 94.7 WMAS, before becoming a DJ at Kiss 108 in Boston. Fahey worked there until he began working for MTV in 2002.

Fahey now regularly hosts as a radio DJ on 104.3 MYfm in Los Angeles, California, which he started in 2012.

=== Television ===
In 2002, Fahey replaced Carson Daly as the host of MTV's Total Request Live after Daly left the network to host his own late-night show on NBC. Fahey continued hosting with Total Request Live until the show ended in 2008.

Fahey was a guest host for CBS's The Late, Late Show in 2004 when Craig Kilborn abruptly exited and was believed to be one of the four finalists for the permanent role.

Fahey was the host for the single season of NBC's I'm a Celebrity Get Me Out of Here in 2009, and later hosted Hulu's The Morning After from 2012 to 2014.

In 2007, Fahey began voice acting on occasion for Family Guy. As part of that team, he began writing for Family Guy in 2015. Fahey then received his first full writing credit for "Run Chris Run" in 2016. He began producing episodes of Family Guy in 2017, moving from co-producer up to supervising producer.

== Personal life ==
Fahey met his now ex-wife, Grasie Mercedes, when they both worked at MTV in 2003, although they didn't start dating until some years later. The pair was married on June 28, 2013, in Camarillo, California.
