= Brian Iles =

American animation director (born 1975)

- Born: Brian Iles; October 20, 1975 (age 49); Sterling, Virginia, U.S.
- Occupation: Director
- Years active: 2001–present
- Spouse: Kelly Iles

Brian Iles is an American animation director. Iles is known for directing several episodes of the animated TV series Family Guy.

Iles has also served as a storyboard revisionist and as a character layout artist on Drawn Together and The Oblongs, respectively.

== Family Guy ==
Iles joined Family Guy in 2007. He has since directed multiple episodes, including:

- "Boys Do Cry" (2007)
- "McStroke" (2008)
- "Back to the Woods" (2008)
- "Family Gay" (2009)
- "Peter's Progress" (2009)
- "Jerome is the New Black" (2009)
- "The Splendid Source" (2010)
- "The Hand That Rocks the Wheelchair" (2011)
- "Seahorse Seashell Party" (2011)
- "Cool Hand Peter" (2011)
- "Forget-Me-Not" (2012)
- "The Old Man and the Big 'C'" (2012)
- "The Giggity Wife" (2013)
- "Save the Clam" (2013)
- "Into Harmony's Way" (2013)
- "Baby Got Black" (2014)
- "This Little Piggy" (2015)
- "Fighting Irish" (2015)
- '"A Shot in the Dark" (2015)
- "The Heartbreak Dog" (2016)
- "Chris Has Got a Date, Date, Date, Date, Date" (2016)
- "The Dating Game" (2017)
- "Foxx in the Men House" (2017)
- "Pal Stewie" (2018)
- "Con Heiress" (2018)
- "Throw It Away" (2019)
- "Shanksgiving" (December 15, 2019)
