= Bill & Peter's Bogus Journey =

- Family Guy episode
- Episode no.: Season 5 Episode 13
- Directed by: Dominic Polcino
- Written by: Steve Callaghan
- Production code: 5ACX07
- Original air date: March 11, 2007

Guest appearances
- Barclay DeVeau; Roy Scheider as himself; Wally Wingert as Barnaby

Episode chronology
← Previous "Airport '07"	Next → "No Meals on Wheels"
- Family Guy season 5

"Bill & Peter's Bogus Journey" is the 13th episode of season five of Family Guy; originally airing on Fox on March 11, 2007. The plot follows Peter feeling depressed at the prospect of becoming old. Former U.S. president Bill Clinton appears and takes him out in Quahog, giving him a new outlook on life. Meanwhile, Stewie and Brian attempt to be toilet trained by buying an instructional video, but Brian persists on leaving his feces in the garden, forcing Lois to make him wear a diaper.

The episode was written by Steve Callaghan and directed by Dominic Polcino. It received mostly mixed reviews from critics for its storyline and many cultural references, in addition to creating controversy, as many Hurricane Katrina evacuees complained over their city being portrayed as an "Atlantis" in the episode. According to Nielsen ratings, it was viewed in 8.05 million homes in its original airing. The episode featured guest performances by Barclay DeVeau, Roy Scheider and Wally Wingert, along with several recurring guest voice actors for the series.

== Plot ==
After being attacked by an octopus at the aquarium, Peter decides to become physically fit, and visits the gym. When former U.S. President Bill Clinton's car breaks down outside their house, Peter attempts to lift it without a jack, which results in him getting a sudden severe hernia and being hospitalized. Depressed at the concept of becoming old, he confides in Bill, who tells him age is a state of mind. When Peter recovers, Bill takes him out to help him realize he can still have fun. They become best friends and spend a lot of time together, but things start to get out of hand when they start smoking marijuana and cause mischief while high on it, including trying to steal a pig.

Believing that Bill is a bad influence on Peter, Lois goes to confront Bill, but ends up having sex with him. Upon learning about the affair shortly after, a devastated Peter leaves Lois and stays at Quagmire's house. Lois is wracked with guilt and visits him, telling him that the only way to mend their relationship is if Peter sleeps with someone else. Though uncertain that it will work, Peter chooses to sleep with Barbara Pewterschmidt, Lois' mother. Barbara turns out to be more than willing, but Peter bails out at the last moment and vows to Lois that he will never sleep with anyone else, and they forgive each other. Peter goes to Bill to end their friendship, only to end up having sex with him, inadvertently getting even with Lois.

Meanwhile, Lois is fed up with stepping in Brian's feces on the lawn and forces him through toilet training himself. Brian and Stewie attempt to learn how to use the toilet, but fail. They buy a toilet training video presented by actor Roy Scheider, which nearly traumatizes them. Lois forces Brian to wear Stewie's diapers to prevent him from defecating in the garden. During the end credits, Brian pretends to be using the toilet as not to be told off by Lois, and begins to leave his feces at an unsuspecting Mayor West's house.

== Production ==
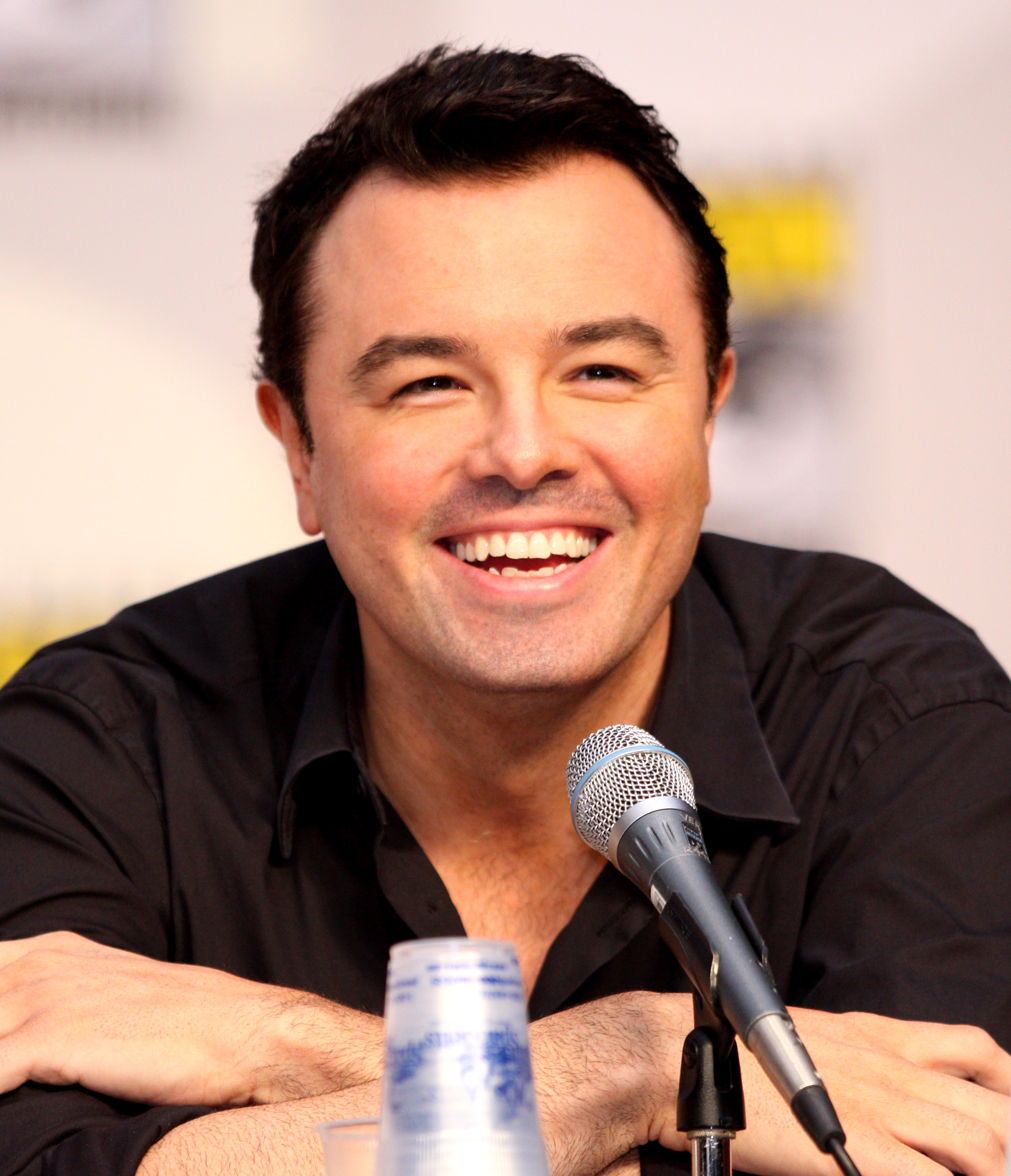
Seth MacFarlane provides the voice of Bill Clinton in the episode since Clinton himself turned down the role.

"Bill & Peter's Bogus Journey" was written by Steve Callaghan and directed by Dominic Polcino. Series regulars Peter Shin and James Purdum acted as the supervising directors of the episode. Show creator Seth MacFarlane and other show producers had suffered a lot of trouble to come up with a funny scene set in an aquarium; in total, five or six scenes had been made, but all were never broadcast because they were deemed not entertaining enough by the producers. Bill Clinton was asked to perform the voice of himself, but declined, so MacFarlane performed it. Animations of Clinton in the episode were originally intended to be a lot fatter, but were slimmed down "because he's lost a lot of weight." Conway Twitty performed two songs in the episode; MacFarlane comments that he loves these scenes. The scene of Lois and Peter mocking Stewie's picture which he drew after pretending to like it was originally designed for "Prick Up Your Ears," but was moved as that episode was exceeding its time limit. The two people typing on their laptops in Starbucks was a scene originally designed for the introductory sequence of "Chick Cancer", as was the scene of Peter having to push Uma Thurman's eyes back together when they move away from her head. The aftermath scene of Lois essentially sleeping with Clinton was discussed extensively in the writer's room for the effects it may have on the show. When Peter visits Bill, he enters the hotel room and says "Hey, Bill, I took this money from Lois's purse, but I don't think she'll notice because she is here... humping you?"; the emphasis on the last two words was performed by Danny Smith, even though MacFarlane voices Peter. A deleted scene was made showing Peter bringing Quahog news reporter Tricia Takanawa home to have sex with, originally intending to make Lois watch and then not being able to bring himself to do it, but this scene was deleted and replaced with Peter's wishes to sleep with Lois's mother. The final scene of the episode showing Mayor West delighted that he has grown sausages (although it is really Brian's waste) was one of several possible ending scenes for the episode; alternatives included Brian leaving his waste at Cleveland Brown and Mort Goldman's house, but in the end, the production crew decided to go with Mayor West.

In addition to the regular cast, actor Roy Scheider played himself on the toilet training video, and voice actors Barclay DeVeau and Wally Wingert guest starred as various characters in the episode. Recurring guest voice actors and writers Danny Smith, Alec Sulkin, and John Viener made minor appearances. Recurring guest cast members Adam West and Patrick Warburton made appearances as well.

== Cultural references ==
The title of this episode is a reference to 1991 film Bill & Ted's Bogus Journey. While Peter and Bill are hanging out at Chuck E. Cheese's, they play Dance Dance Revolution with "Barbie Girl" by Aqua as the selected song. A toilet-training instructional video is featured, narrated by comedian and actor Roy Scheider. Former President of the United States Bill Clinton was parodied in this episode. His request for a cigar after sleeping with Lois references his affair with Monica Lewinsky. Amateur writers are seen working at a Starbucks.

== Reception ==
In a slight decrease from the previous week, the episode was viewed in 8.05 million homes in its original airing, according to Nielsen ratings. The episode also acquired a 2.8 rating in the 18-49 demographic, being slightly edged out by The Simpsons.

This episode received yet more negative reception from the frequent critic Parents Television Council (PTC), calling it the "worst TV show of the week" for August 10, 2007. PTC said that the episode "treated audiences to another half-hour of the most depraved and disrespectful programming imaginable." IGN's Ahsan Haque wrote, "'Bill and Peter's Bogus Journey' has a few truly hilarious moments, but the main storyline ends up taking a backseat to an overabundance of unfunny manatee jokes," concluding to give the episode a final rating of 7.1 out of 10.
