= Airport '07 =

- Family Guy episode
- Episode no.: Season 5 Episode 12
- Directed by: John Holmquist
- Written by: Tom Devanney
- Production code: 5ACX08
- Original air date: March 4, 2007

Guest appearance
- Hugh Hefner as himself

Episode chronology
← Previous "The Tan Aquatic with Steve Zissou"	Next → "Bill & Peter's Bogus Journey"
- Family Guy season 5

"Airport '07" is the twelfth episode of season five of the animated sitcom Family Guy. The episode originally broadcast on Fox on March 4, 2007. The plot follows the Griffin family's neighbor Quagmire being dismissed from his job as a pilot after Peter sabotages his airplane by emptying the fuel tank, causing it to crash. Peter, Joe and Cleveland make a plan to get Quagmire his job back and, although the plan itself fails, Quagmire is re-hired.

Written by Tom Devanney and directed by John Holmquist, the episode received mostly positive reviews from critics. According to Nielsen ratings, it was watched by 8.59 million households in its original airing. The episode featured guest performances by Barclay DeVeau, Hugh Hefner, Phil LaMarr, Rachael MacFarlane and Fred Tatasciore, along with several recurring guest voice actors from the series.

== Plot ==
After seeing a redneck comedy show, Peter purchases a pickup truck and decides to become a redneck himself. He does stereotypical redneck things as bringing the couch out onto the lawn, propositioning his daughter Meg, and chewing tobacco. Peter paints a large patriotic and anti-abortion message on the rear window of his pickup, which obscures his view and causes him to reverse into Quagmire's car, destroying it. As a result, Peter has to drive Quagmire to the airport, where he is due to fly an airplane from Quahog to Atlanta. While at the airport, Peter steals the fuel used for Quagmire's airplane, believing it will make his pickup fly. As a result, Quagmire's plane runs out of fuel part way into the flight and crashes. Quagmire loses his job and after draining his life savings within a few weeks is forced to live with the Griffins until he can find another job.

Annoyed by Quagmire's behavior in the house, Peter's wife Lois tells him to help Quagmire get a job. Quagmire fails in every job they find, complaining the only thing he can do well is fly a plane. Peter, Quagmire, Joe and Cleveland make a plan for Quagmire to get his job back: whilst Quagmire is a passenger on a flight, the others will impersonate cabin crew to get onto the flight, then drug the pilots so Quagmire will have to step in and safely land the plane. Shortly after takeoff, Peter, Joe and Cleveland drug the pilots and call for help, only for them to find Quagmire is not on board because he was having sex with a woman at the check-in desk. As none of them can fly the plane, it goes into freefall. Quagmire is deeply disappointed with himself, and goes to the bar, where Playboy founder Hugh Hefner meets him. Hefner tells Quagmire that the late pornographic actor John Holmes believed that Quagmire was the greatest pilot of all time. Feeling reinvigorated, he goes off to the air traffic control tower and, via radio, gives Peter detailed instructions on how to land the plane safely. As a reward for his work, Quagmire's job is reinstated.

== Production ==
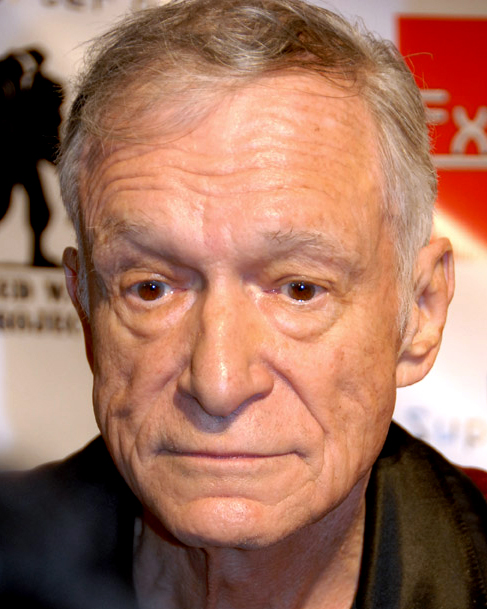
Hugh Hefner guest-starred in the episode.

Hugh Hefner provided his own voice for the episode. In the DVD commentary, show producer David Goodman comments that, throughout the episode, little respect is shown for rednecks. The Thai women escaping from Quagmire's car after Peter crashes into it were all voiced by Cherry Chevapravatdumrong, a Family Guy writer and producer who has Thai ancestry, while Quagmire (voiced by series creator Seth MacFarlane) utters several phrases in the same language. MacFarlane said on the commentary that Chevapravatdumrong taught him the phrases and that he did not know their meanings. Mayor West is shown reading My Pet Goat to children at a school as he is being told about the plane crash, then ignoring the news and continuing to read the book; this is a reference to the reaction of George W. Bush after being informed about the September 11, 2001 attacks. The sketch showing news anchorman Tom Tucker showing several scenarios of how the crash could have turned out is a reference, MacFarlane states, "to how irresponsible it is". The scenario of the airplane crash survivor slapping his wife eight times was toned down to four on the Fox airing and the syndicated version. There is also a crotch shot of Peter getting out of Paris Hilton's car, which was censored with pixelization on TV, but shown uncensored on DVD.

The name that the person specified on the telephone when ringing the Griffins' house to contact Quagmire ("Long Rod von HugenDong") was changed, as broadcasting standards personnel objected to the original name (which was "Long Rod von HugenSchlong"). The "Prom Night Dumpster Baby" gag was pitched by Danny Smith. Walter Murphy organized a 40-piece orchestra to perform the musical for the episode. The scene of Quagmire working as Joe's diaper changer (with Joe so humiliated over it that he asks Quagmire to help him commit suicide) was edited on Fox (but not Cartoon Network), as Fox objected to the feces joke and the suicide reference. The "Who Else But Quagmire" cutaway which implied that Quagmire had sex with a dead woman met with objection from Fox censors who were more concerned that the violated dead woman was implied to be a virgin. After engaging in sex with an airport worker, Quagmire states "the contents of your vagina may have shifted during coitus." On FOX, "vagina" was changed to "panties." The conversation between Hugh Hefner and Quagmire in the airport has a slight echo, due to recording in Hefner's den rather than the production studios. As a result, an echo of similar level was added to Quagmire's voice in order to equal both voices out.

In addition to the regular cast and Hefner, voice actors Barclay DeVeau, Phil LaMarr, Rachael MacFarlane and Fred Tatasciore guest-starred in the episode. Recurring guest voice actors Lori Alan, actor Ralph Garman, writer Mark Hentemann, writer Danny Smith, writer Alec Sulkin and writer John Viener made minor appearances.

== Cultural references ==
The start of the show introduces many references to famous redneck comedians such as Larry the Cable Guy. Peter imagining flying his pickup truck through the air and greeting fighter jet pilots is a reference to Top Gun. After Quagmire crashes the plane, his co-pilot is shown to be Nien Nunb, a reference to 1983 science-fiction film Return of the Jedi. The mice that say "three weeks later" is a reference to 1995 film Babe. The faux introduction after Peter and Lois' conversation about Quagmire is a reference to Will & Grace. The scene of the airplane taking off as Peter and his friends prepare to drug the pilots is a reference to Airplane!, as is Hugh Hefner's pep talk to Quagmire and the playing of the Notre Dame Victory March. Other music from Airplane! is used as Quagmire is assisting Peter in landing the airplane safely. The "Prom Night Dumpster Baby" song is a reference to Melissa Drexler's 1997 homicide of her baby at her senior prom. The scene in which Mayor Adam West is reading a story book to kids is a reference to George W. Bush, who was reading to kids at a school in Florida when he learned of the September 11 attacks. The style of the end credits in the episode is almost exactly similar to the ones used on the television series Little House on the Prairie.

== Reception ==
In a very slight improvement over the previous week, the episode was viewed in 8.59 million homes in its original airing, according to Nielsen ratings. The episode also acquired a 3.0 rating in the 18-49 demographic, being slightly edged out by The Simpsons, while still winning over American Dad!.

In a review of Family Guy, Volume five, Nancy Basile regarded "Airport '07," alongside "Prick Up Your Ears," and "Barely Legal" as "gem episodes." Ahsan Haque of IGN commented "When Family Guy is at its best, audiences are typically presented with an overwhelming barrage of cultural references, some disturbing imagery, and usually left with a sufficiently catchy musical number — all put together to tell a somewhat cohesive story. In this respect, 'Airport '07' succeeds admirably by excelling at all of the above," adding that "the disturbing elements in this episode seem to be there purely for shock value." Brett Love of TV Squad reviewed the episode positively, writing "Peter finding the identity he'd been searching for his whole life, that of a redneck, was a long way to go to get to him being the cause of Quagmire getting fired, but it was worth the trip," adding "there were a lot of fun bits in the redneck segment." Love concluded to write "Overall, a really good episode."
