= No Chris Left Behind =

- Family Guy episode
- Episode no.: Season 5 Episode 16
- Directed by: Pete Michels
- Written by: Patrick Meighan
- Production code: 5ACX11
- Original air date: May 6, 2007

Guest appearances
- Gary Cole as Principal Shepherd; Neil Patrick Harris as Barney Stinson; Phil LaMarr; Josh Radnor as Ted Mosby; Tara Strong as Japanese Girl

Episode chronology
← Previous "Boys Do Cry"	Next → "It Takes a Village Idiot, and I Married One"
- Family Guy season 5

"No Chris Left Behind" is the 16th episode of the fifth season of the animated comedy series Family Guy. It originally aired on Fox in the United States on May 6, 2007. The episode sees Chris get expelled from James Woods High School for dragging down their test scores. He is forced to attend an upper-class academy that does not take kindly to Chris's economically middle-class and socially lower-class upbringing. In an effort to fit in, he decides to join the academy's Skull and Bones society, but he quickly finds participation in its activities to be too demanding.

The episode was written by Patrick Meighan and directed by Pete Michels. It received praise from critics for its storyline and many cultural references, in addition to receiving an Emmy Award for Outstanding Individual Achievement in Animation. According to Nielsen ratings, it was viewed in 7.95 million homes in its original airing. The episode featured guest performances by Gary Cole, Neil Patrick Harris, Phil LaMarr, Josh Radnor and Tara Strong, along with several recurring guest voice actors for the series.

== Plot ==
Seeking to spend time with her family, Lois decides to take them out to the ballet Swan Lake, on a late school night, much to the family's dismay. The next morning, Chris is seen studying at the breakfast table for an upcoming exam at school. After first being told not to study at the table by Lois, Brian notices that Chris' history textbook is hopelessly out of date. Upset by this, Lois goes to a PTA meeting to complain about the textbook. Responding to her grievances, Principal Shepherd explains that the school cannot afford new textbooks due to the school's loss of federal funding under the No Child Left Behind Act as a result of their low test scores. Forced to make a decision on how to improve the scores and the school's overall performance, Principal Shepherd decides to expel the school's "dumbest" student, Chris Griffin.

While talking about Chris' situation with Lois, Peter is suddenly confronted by the Giant Chicken. This is the third fight between the two. Their epic battle ranges from the Griffin house, through the sewers, onto a subway train, over the girders of a high-rise construction site, and then up into a biplane, crashing into a giant Ferris wheel, which is dislodged from its platform and rolls through the streets. The fight continues atop the rolling wheel until it demolishes a ten-story apartment building. Emerging from the wreckage, Peter and the Chicken realize that neither has any idea what they were fighting about. They apologize to each other, and the Chicken invites Peter to join him and his wife, Nicole, for dinner. At the restaurant, the three have just finished a lovely meal when the check arrives, and both Peter and the Chicken (named Ernie) insist on paying the tab—Peter insists on paying since his order was kind of expensive while Ernie insists on paying as a way of apologizing to Peter. As they face off, the fight resumes and leads them into the restaurant kitchen. Peter subdues Ernie with a pot of boiling water and beats him unconscious. Peter staggers home, and back in the kitchen, Ernie lies lifeless on the floor, but in a sudden close-up, Ernie's left eye opens as dramatic music plays, foreshadowing another chicken fight. Peter goes home and resumes his conversation with Lois.

After several failed attempts to find another school for Chris, Lois asks her father, Carter Pewterschmidt, to utilize his superior influence to get Chris admitted to the upper-class Morningwood Academy, which he agrees to on the condition that Peter humiliate himself by starring in a shot-by-shot remake of Liar Liar, and eventually succeeds in doing so. At his new school, Chris is shunned by the wealthy students at the academy, being both verbally and physically assaulted, including being hit with socks full of paper money. After hearing this, Lois again turns to her father to help Chris, by inviting him to become a member of the Skull and Bones society with the other students, who eventually come to accept him.

Meanwhile, the family have all begun to take extra jobs to pay for Chris' tuition; Peter sells butt scratchers at the ballpark, Lois and Meg begin working as prostitutes, and Stewie decides to follow overweight park-goers, while playing the tuba, making them fall and charge them US$60. As this is happening, Chris starts to feel uncomfortable with his membership at the Skull and Bones, especially after one of their activities involves teasing an orphan they had pretended to adopt, and an initiation where each new young member has to play "7 minutes in heaven" in a closet with the club's pedophile eldest member, Herbert. Feeling his family should not go through so much trouble to keep him satisfied, Chris asks Carter to help him get back into his old school. Carter complies with his request, Chris moves back home, and returns to James Woods High School. At the end of the episode, Stewie plays the tuba for Chris, making him fall.

== Production ==
The episode was written by series regular Patrick Meighan, in his second episode for the season, the first being "Road to Rupert", and directed by former Rugrats and Rocko's Modern Life director Pete Michels, also in his second episode for the season, the first being "Chick Cancer", before the conclusion of the fifth production season.

Some scenes that have been changed between the TV version and the Cartoon Network/DVD version include: the scene in which the family finds out how bad James Woods High is after Chris reveals that his history textbook is outdated (on the TV version, the textbook was originally from 1948 and included a chapter on Israel becoming a new country. On the Cartoon Network/DVD version, the textbook is from 1896 and includes a chapter called, "Negroes: America's Dancin'est Rapefolk," and Lois commenting in disgust about how no one uses the word "Negro" anymore) and the cutaway scene of Chris firing Rocky from punching the meat hanging in the freezers of the butcher shop (with Rocky pointing out that Pauly is having sex with one of the meat cuts).

In addition to the regular cast, actor Gary Cole, actor Neil Patrick Harris, voice actor Phil LaMarr, actor Josh Radnor and voice actress Tara Strong guest starred in the episode. Recurring guest voice actors Ralph Garman, writer Mark Hentemann, writer Chris Sheridan, writer Danny Smith, writer Alec Sulkin and writer John Viener also made minor appearances.

== Cultural references ==
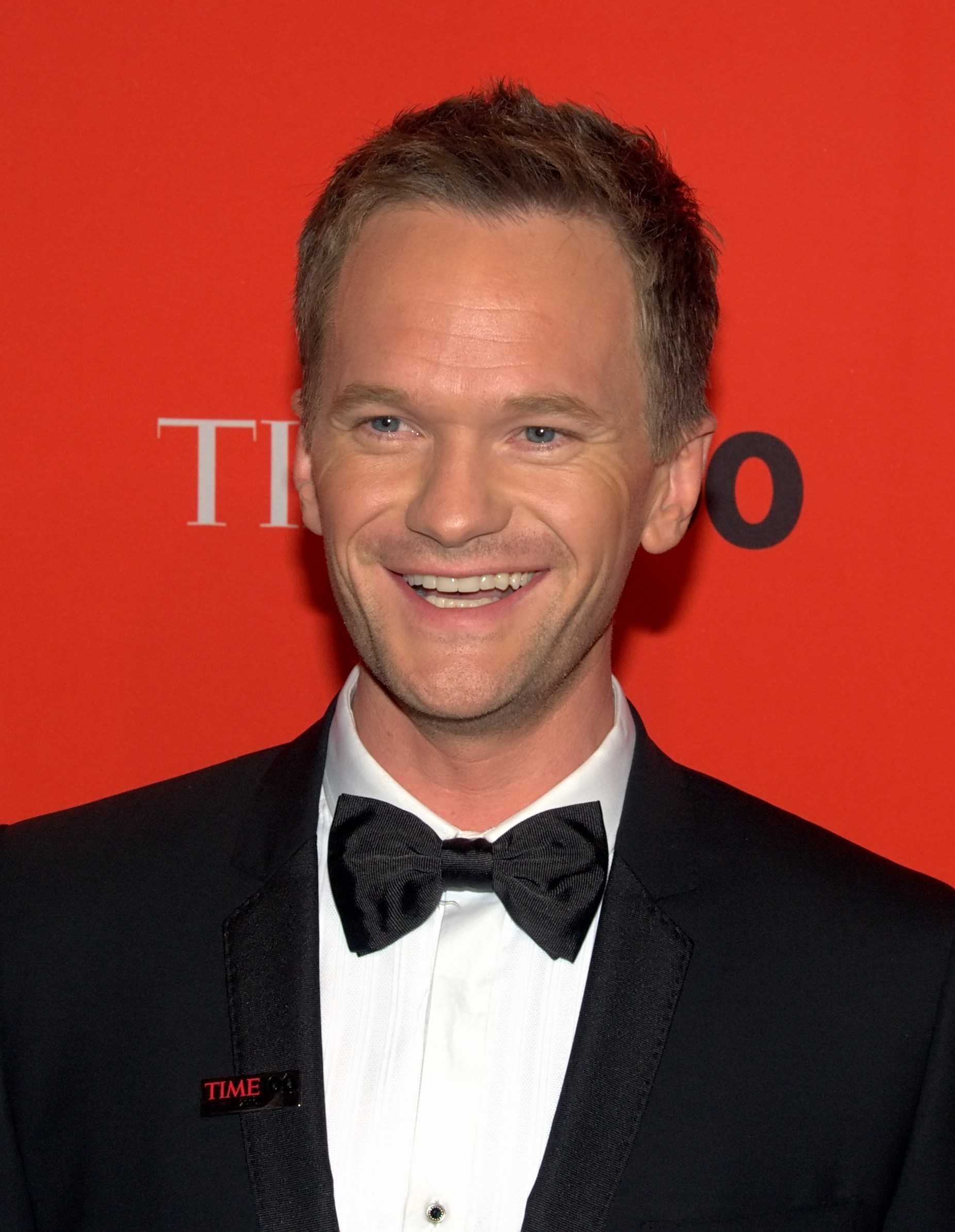
Neil Patrick Harris guest starred in the episode as Barney Stinson of How I Met Your Mother.

In the opening scene of the episode, the Griffin family is seen watching a television show entitled How I Met Your Father, a parody of the CBS comedy-sitcom How I Met Your Mother, which was created by Craig Thomas and Carter Bays, who were writers for MacFarlane's sister show, American Dad!. Actors Josh Radnor and Neil Patrick Harris make cameo appearances, voicing their characters, Ted Mosby and Barney Stinson, who end up kissing passionately by the end of the scene.

During Peter's prolonged fight with the Giant Chicken, a scene involving an electric carving knife is taken from the James Bond film The Living Daylights. A Wilhelm scream is heard during the Chicken fight.

Stating his desire to become more powerful, Stewie references the Neighborhood of Make-Believe from Mister Rogers' Neighborhood, and is then shown portraying King Friday XIII. The cutaway features a live action hand puppet segment, in which Stewie is making a proclamation to his subjects, before the Trolley comes along. This is the third reference to the show since the second season episodes "Brian in Love" and "Running Mates".

In an attempt to get Chris into Morningwood Academy, Peter is forced by Carter Pewterschmidt to appear in a remake of the 1997 comedy film Liar Liar. After Chris is accepted to Morningwood Academy, he is asleep in his bed for the night, and is suddenly attacked by a group of classmates, who stuff wads of dollar bills into their socks, and quickly begin beating him with the weapons. This scene is a parody of the sequence shown in director Stanley Kubrick's 1987 war film Full Metal Jacket, in which the Marine recruits take turns striking Private Pyle with bars of soap wrapped in towels as punishment for frequently getting them in trouble.

== Reception ==
In a slight decrease from the previous week's show, the episode was viewed in 7.95 million homes in its original airing, according to Nielsen ratings, in the United States. The episode also acquired a 2.8 rating in the 18–49 demographic, slightly edging out The Simpsons, in addition to significantly winning over series creator Seth MacFarlane's second show on Fox, American Dad!, in both rating and total viewership.

Reviews of the episode by television critics were mostly positive, calling it "refreshing." Ahsan Haque of IGN praised the episode's extended chicken fight scene, going on to note, "Like every other encounter with the Giant Chicken, this was highly entertaining, incredibly creative and just the type of sequence the Family Guy needs more of." In contrast, Brett Love of TV Squad found the chicken scene to be too long, stating, "there are only 22 minutes per episode [...] Taking a quarter of that for the chicken fight is just ridiculous." Love did enjoy the scenes involving Chris's time at Morningwood Academy, however, going on to mention that he "would have liked to see a little more of Chris and Carter bonding over Skull and Bones adventures."

"No Chris Left Behind" was nominated for, and won the Primetime Emmy for Outstanding Individual Achievement in Animation. The recipient of the award was episode storyboard artist Steven Fonti, who was awarded the distinction due to his work in storyboarding the episode's chicken fight scene. In addition, Steven Fonti's chicken fight sequence was also nominated for, and won, the Annie Award hosted by ASIFA-Hollywood at the 35th annual award ceremony for Outstanding Individual Achievement in Storyboarding in an Animated Television Production.
