= Hell Comes to Quahog =

- Family Guy episode
- Episode no.: Season 5 Episode 3
- Directed by: Dan Povenmire
- Written by: Kirker Butler
- Production code: 4ACX33
- Original air date: September 24, 2006

Guest appearances
- Dave Boat; Carrie Fisher as Angela; Phil LaMarr as Ollie Williams; Rachael MacFarlane as Jennifer Love Hewitt; Fred Tatasciore

Episode chronology
| ← Previous "Mother Tucker" | Next → "Saving Private Brian" |
- Family Guy season 5

"Hell Comes to Quahog" is the third episode of the fifth season of the animated comedy series Family Guy, an episode produced for Season 4. It originally aired on Fox on September 24, 2006. The episode follows Meg after she requests her parents to buy her a car. At the showroom, however, her father, Peter, decides to buy a tank, instead of the car Meg was interested in. Deciding to pay for a new car herself, Meg is able to get a job at Superstore USA, which eventually destroys the local economy of Quahog, and upsets the local community, leading Brian Griffin and Stewie to save the day.

The episode was written by Kirker Butler and directed by Dan Povenmire. It received mostly positive reviews from critics for its storyline and entertaining cultural references. It was viewed by 9.66 million viewers in its original airing. The episode featured guest performances by Dave Boat, Carrie Fisher, Phil LaMarr, Rachael MacFarlane, and Fred Tatasciore, along with several recurring guest voice actors for the series. "Hell Comes to Quahog" was released on DVD along with twelve other episodes from the season on September 18, 2007.

== Plot ==
Peter, Cleveland, Joe, and Quagmire are spending the evening at The Drunken Clam, when Peter is reminded to pick up Meg from the roller skating rink. They then go to the rink and continue to enjoy themselves, while skating. The guys forget to pick up Meg when they leave. After skating home in the rain, Meg asks the family for her own car. The next day, Peter takes his daughter to the local car dealership, where she shows an interest in a sedan. Distracted by a large tank at the dealership, however, Peter is tricked into buying it. At first, Peter uses the tank himself, despite it being intended for Meg, but then he teaches Meg to drive it. Later that day, however, the two accidentally run over Joe, and he impounds the tank. Frustrated, Meg decides to earn the money for her own car, and is able to get a job at the local Quahog megastore, Superstore USA, working under a man named Mr. Penisburg. The shops in Quahog soon go bankrupt because of the new superstore, and causes people to lose their jobs.

Meanwhile, Peter loses his job at the Pawtucket Brewery because Superstore USA has its own brewery and they can't compete with them. Back at the house, Brian, Chris, and Peter watch TV and on the news, Tom says that Quahog is suffering a heat wave across the city, with Superstore USA taking away the neighborhood power to power their cooling system. Disjointed, Peter joins an angry protest outside the store, but after entering the store to encourage customers to leave, Peter is impressed by its central cooling system, and decides to become an employee also working under Mr. Penisburg, with Meg as his superior. Later, Meg is promoted to assistant manager by Mr. Penisburg, who immediately instructs her to fire Peter. Despite her reservations about her father, she chooses her family over her job and quits. In the meantime, Brian and Stewie decide to destroy the superstore completely by retrieving Peter's tank, and driving it through the superstore, while Peter and Meg escape through an emergency exit. After bulldozing the store, Brian and Stewie drive outside and demolish it with the tank's cannon, killing Penisburg and Paddy Tanniger in the process. Immediately afterwards, the electricity supply to Quahog is restored, and life returns to normal.

== Production ==
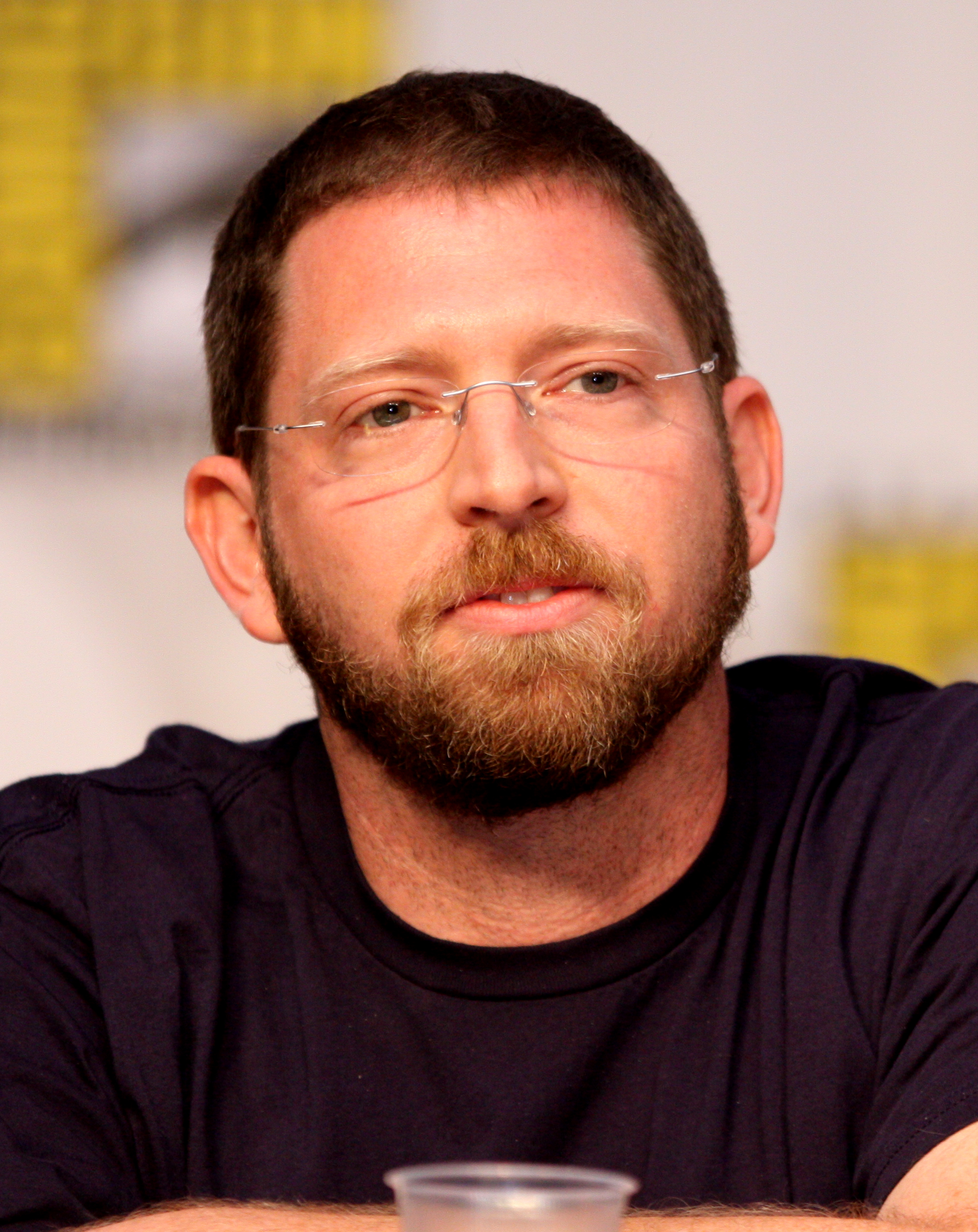
Kirker Butler wrote the episode.

The episode was written by Kirker Butler and directed by Dan Povenmire. Several variations were made to the Iceman scene, who was originally meant to be fighting with his wife, but was changed for legal reasons.

Several scenes and gags had to be removed from the television broadcast of the episode, as they were deemed inappropriate. This includes a scene when Brian recalls being stroked too hard by a "Special Child," in which he retaliates by biting the child's hand. The final scene, also censored from television airing, involved Chris laughing excessively at one of his own jokes, concluding with "Oh, I peed and pooped." These scenes were removed from FOX, but not from Adult Swim or the Volume Five DVD. Another scene involves a man driving in a Hummer, while watching the 2005 film Madagascar in his car. The man then exclaims "Dude, those animals are so fucking funny," which was mistakenly broadcast uncensored in Canada, though this problem was corrected for future broadcasts. The censors remained intact in the United States.

The episode also marks the final appearance of the recurring character Paddy Tanniger (who debuted in the second season episode "Fore, Father"), who gets run over and killed by the tank driven by Stewie and Brian; according to Kirker Butler in the DVD commentary for the episode, the decision to kill off Tanniger was made due to the fact that he disliked the character.

"Hell Comes to Quahog", along with the twelve other episodes from Family Guy's fifth season, were released on a three-disc DVD set in the United States on September 18, 2007. The sets included brief audio commentaries by Seth MacFarlane and various crew and cast members for several episodes, a collection of deleted scenes and animatics, a special mini-feature which discusses the process behind drawing Peter Griffin, and mini-feature entitled "Toys, Toys Galore".

In addition to the regular cast, voice actor Dave Boat, actress Carrie Fisher, voice actor Phil LaMarr, voice actress Rachael MacFarlane and voice actor Fred Tatasciore guest starred in the episode. Recurring guest voice actors Lori Alan, actress Alex Breckenridge, actor Johnny Brennan, actor Ralph Garman, writer Danny Smith, writer Alec Sulkin and writer John Viener made minor appearances.

== Cultural references ==
The title of the episode parodies the title of the 1988 cult film, Hell Comes to Frogtown. In the opening scene of the episode, Peter, Joe, Quagmire and Cleveland are shown playing ping pong at the local bar. Once Joe accidentally hits their final ping pong ball out a window, Peter responds by forcing the puppet character Mr. Moose, from the children's television series Captain Kangaroo, to tell a knock-knock joke. This causes hundreds of ping pong balls to cascade from the ceiling above them. Going on to exclaim the amount of fun he is having, Peter recounts his performance in a Broadway musical version of the 1984 film Red Dawn.

After being reminded to pick up Meg at the local roller rink, Peter and his friends decide to go skating. At the roller rink scene, the 1976 disco song "A Fifth of Beethoven" is featured, performed by Walter Murphy. This is a tongue-in-cheek gag, as Murphy is also one of the composers for Family Guy. After returning home without Meg, the Griffin family are shown watching a Pepperidge Farm commercial on their television. Immediately afterwards, Meg enters her home, and begs her parents to get buy her a new vehicle. Reluctant to do so, Peter informs Meg that plenty of people are able to get around without a car, including the fictional Marvel Comics superhero Iceman. Finally deciding to give in and purchase a vehicle for Meg, the Griffin family head to the local car dealership. While there, Brian notices a large amount of Hummers, and questions who would ever want to drive one. A cutaway then shows a loud, obnoxious man driving a yellow Hummer, who goes on to brag about being able to watch the 2005 film Madagascar while driving, and proceeds to destroy two vehicles in the process while yelling the name of former United States Secretary of Defense Donald Rumsfeld.

Returning home with the tank, Peter decides to surprise his wife, Lois, with his new purchase. Once Lois opens her eyes, she exclaims the phrase "Bocce balls!", which was originally from the 1984 comedy film Splash. Coming to accept the tank, Lois and Peter decide to take it to a drive-in theater, where they are shown watching a film entitled The Even Couple, by screenwriter Neil Simon, and starring actors Jeff Daniels and Bill Pullman. The next day, after the tank is impounded by Joe, the family is shown watching the CBS television drama Ghost Whisperer, with Jennifer Love Hewitt then appearing on screen. Meg then interrupts, and expresses her anger at her father for allowing the tank to be impounded. Her father then responds by stating that it is "not the worst thing" he has ever done, with a cutaway of Peter murdering Yogi Bear then being shown.

The Superstore USA store is similar to Wal-Mart. Frustrated by her father, Meg decides to get a job at Superstore USA. As she is being instructed about her job by her new boss, he tells her to feed a Baby Ruth chocolate bar to the deformed man Sloth from the 1985 film The Goonies. As Superstore USA begins to take over the town, it is announced that rolling blackouts will be performed in order to meet the store's need for electricity. A commercial during Quahog's local news is then played, parodying the theme to the 1971 children's television series The Electric Company. While Stewie and Brian attack the store, the manager of Superstore USA runs to hide in the bathroom before being crushed by the billboard in front of him. This is a reference to the Jurassic Park scene where the attorney also hides in a bathroom before being eaten by the T-Rex. In addition, the music that is played when Brian and Stewie are destroying the store follows the style of Elmer Bernstein's theme to Stripes.

== Reception ==
In a slight improvement over the previous week, the episode brought in 9.66 million viewers on its original airing, according to the Nielsen ratings. The episode acquired a 3.4 rating in the 18–49 demographic, tying with The Simpsons, and edging out series creator Seth MacFarlane's second show American Dad!, in both ratings and total viewership.

Reviews of the episode by television critics were mostly positive, noting its "hilarious beginning and the nice ending." Dan Iverson of IGN praised the episode, stating that the episode "looks to show that this fifth season is going to bring the series back to the irreverent basics that made it so appealing." Iverson went on to comment that some of the jokes were "extremely funny" and that "the episode had it all, from the Electric Company bit to making fun of people who drive Hummers and watch movies like Madagascar." In the conclusion of his review, Iverson gave the episode an eight out of ten. Brett Love of TV Squad also gave the episode a positive review, calling the installment much better than the previous two episode's from the season, "Stewie Loves Lois" and "Mother Tucker", but criticized the storyline's similarity to the South Park episode "Something Wall-Mart This Way Comes". Love commented negatively on the portrayal of Peter working at the superstore, however, stating, "it's a fine line when they go retarded with Peter. Sometimes it plays really funny, and sometimes it just gets annoying."
