= Whistle While Your Wife Works =

- Family Guy episode
- Episode no.: Season 5 Episode 5
- Directed by: Greg Colton
- Written by: Steve Callaghan
- Production code: 4ACX35
- Original air date: November 12, 2006

Guest appearances
- Drew Barrymore as Jillian; Bobby Costanzo as Danny DeVito; Barclay DeVeau as one of Jillian's friends; Carrie Fisher as Angela; Anne-Michelle Seiler as one of Jillian's friends; Audrey Wasilewski as one of Jillian's friends

Episode chronology
← Previous "Saving Private Brian"	Next → "Prick Up Your Ears"
- Family Guy season 5

"Whistle While Your Wife Works" is the fifth episode of season five of Family Guy, the last episode produced for Season 4. The show originally aired on Fox on November 12, 2006. The plot follows Peter losing his fingers after an accident while holding fireworks. Behind on his work and threatened with the possibility of dismissal, he asks Lois to catch up on his work for him, to which she agrees. However, he repeatedly attempts to seduce her, eventually succeeding, distracting her from the work. Meanwhile, Brian begins dating a woman named Jillian who, much to Stewie's delight, lacks general knowledge and intelligence.

The episode was written by Steve Callaghan and directed by Greg Colton. It received mostly mixed reviews from critics for its storyline and many cultural references. According to Nielsen ratings, the episode was viewed in 9.04 million homes in its original airing. The episode featured guest performances by Drew Barrymore, Bobby Costanzo, Barclay DeVeau, Carrie Fisher, Anne-Michelle Seiler and Audrey Wasilewski, along with several recurring guest voice actors for the series.

== Plot ==
The opening sequence is different from many other episodes in that Peter trips during the theme song and injures a stage dancer, consequently puncturing her lung. After the fall, Peter complains that his foot is starting to swell up. Also, Stewie comes towards the camera screen and suggests they cut from the opening sequence.

Quagmire returns home from a holiday in Florida and comes to the Griffins' house to tell Peter that he has smuggled some fireworks into Quahog by hiding them in his anus, despite Peter telling him that fireworks are not illegal in Quahog. Later on, the Griffins and Quagmire start to play with the fireworks. Peter attaches ten M-80s together and shows Quagmire. However, the M-80s detonate, detaching all the fingers on his right hand. With Joe's help, Peter is able to find his fingers and later gets them reattached. The next day, Peter celebrates getting his fingers reattached by going to The Drunken Clam with Cleveland, Joe and Quagmire. They decide to continue their celebrations at Pawtucket Brewery after the bar closes. Peter is behind on his work at the brewery, as he is unable to type due to his hand injury, and Angela threatens to fire him if he fails to catch up, so he asks Lois to help him. When Lois agrees to help Peter catch up on his work, Peter repeatedly attempts to seduce her. Later at the brewery, after a final attempt to seduce Lois in his office, she gives in and they have sex in front of their co-worker Opie, who runs away screaming. In the end, Peter is caught up with his work and enjoys having Lois help out and have sex with him.

Meanwhile, Brian reluctantly introduces his family to his new girlfriend, Jillian. Stewie discovers she is a dumb blonde, and mocks Brian. Peter and Chris take an instant liking to Jillian while Lois and Stewie find her stupidity amusing. The next day, Brian goes out with Jillian, where he meets her equally unintelligent friends. Stewie warns Brian that the relationship will not succeed, so Brian visits Jillian's apartment to end the relationship, only for her to answer the door while drying off with a towel. She proceeds to dry her hair off, causing Brian's libido to take control, and they end up sleeping together instead. Waiting in Brian's car, Stewie apparently anticipated this when Brian returns to his car three hours later, so he mocks Brian to the tune of Gary Numan's "Cars", much to Brian's annoyance.

== Production ==
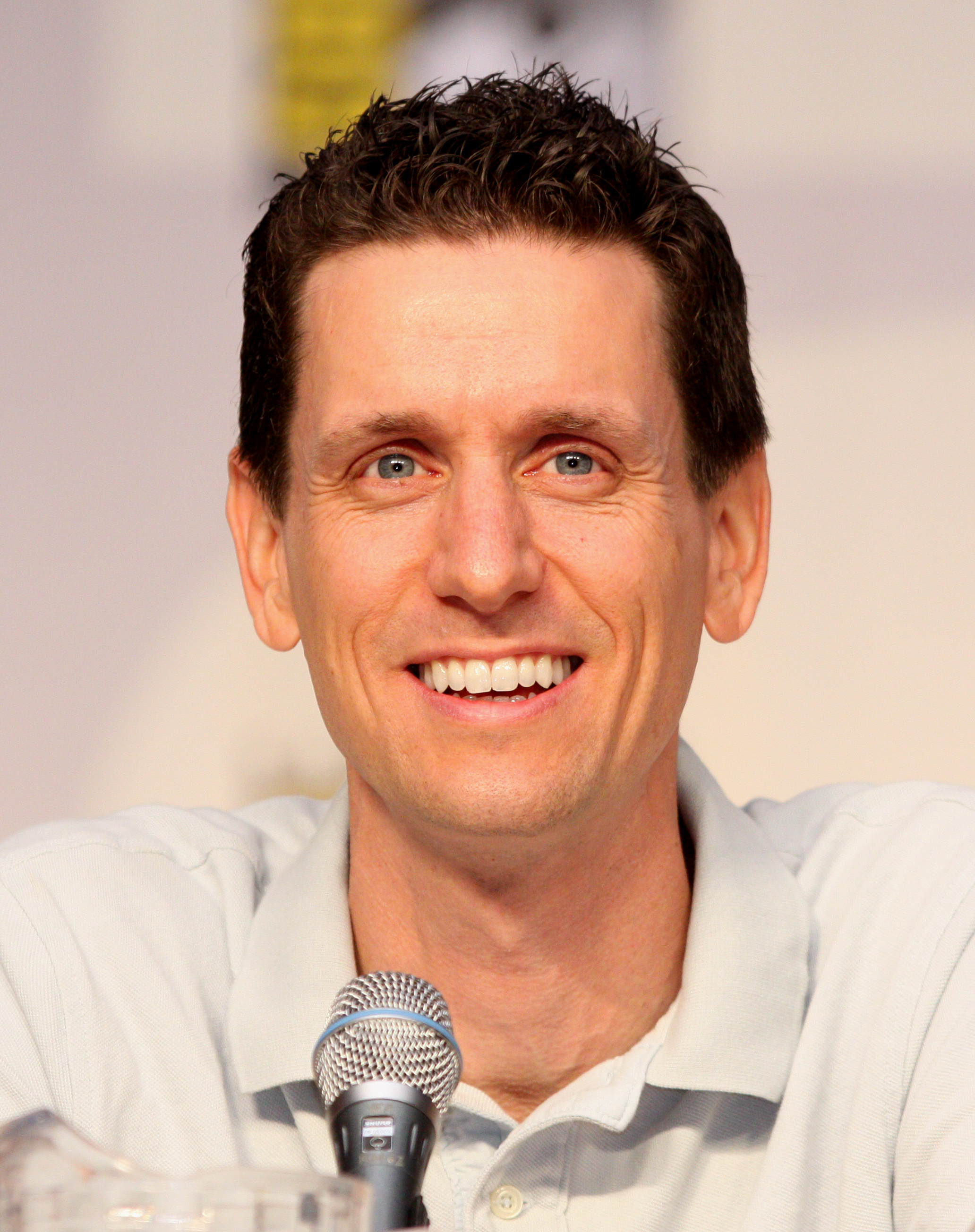
Episode Writer Steve Callaghan created the character of Jillian.

The character of Jillian was altered several times by the show producers before its original airing; however, the final character personality was designed to be that of "a bulimic cheerleader". The character of Jillian was also designed to be "not the brightest bauble on the tree", but this too was repeatedly changed. The description of Jillian's voice being that of a bulimic cheerleader somewhat relates to a future episode plot, where Stewie calls Jillian fat, to which she responds by leaving the room and throwing up. When Stewie exclaims "it's like she's fucking five", this was not set to broadcast at its original air date, but rather added in at a later date for unknown reasons. When Stewie is entertaining the elderly citizens by singing a song entitled "there's a hole in the bottom of the sea", this is actually Seth MacFarlane's father playing the guitar, as he used to sing it to Seth when he was a child. During the making of this episode, not much thought was put into the character of Jillian, despite the fact she was always meant to be recurring character; although her regular appearances throughout season 5 were described as "a big thing for Family Guy".

In addition to the regular cast, actress Drew Barrymore, voice actor Bobby Costanzo, voice actor Barclay DeVeau, actress Carrie Fisher, voice actress Anne-Michelle Seiler and actress Audrey Wasilewski guest starred in the episode. Recurring guest voice actor John G. Brennan, and writers Mike Henry, Mark Hentemann, Danny Smith, Alec Sulkin, and John Viener made minor appearances. Actor Patrick Warburton also appeared in the episode as well.

== Cultural references ==
Show creator Seth MacFarlane claims on the DVD commentary track that, unlike most Family Guy episodes, this episode has no cultural references or references to real-world events except for Chris calling Meg "David Koresh" when they play with fireworks and the cutaway of Peter, Joe, Quagmire, and Cleveland spending last Saturday with the Lord of Darkness from Legend. There was also a discussion that the gang had about the show Wings while swimming in the beer tank. Quagmire admits that he is the most knowledgeable about the show because he is a pilot and the show focuses on two pilots. When Peter goes to look at his secret stash of pornography, the intro from Get Smart is referenced. Stewie asks Brian if Jillian has an alibi, and Brian says no. Stewie starts singing the song "U.G.L.Y.", understanding that Jillian does not have an alibi. Brian sets up a cutaway when he says that breaking up with Jillian will be tougher than the reviews for Our American Cousin. The ensuing gag shows the actors looking for mention of their play following the assassination of Abraham Lincoln.

== Reception ==
In a slight improvement over the previous week, the episode was viewed in 9.04 million homes in its original airing, according to Nielsen ratings. The episode also acquired a 3.2 rating in the 18–49 demographic, slightly being beat by The Simpsons, while still winning over American Dad!.

IGN's Dan Iverson gave a mixed review, commenting that "it is only passable" and that "it did not have that laugh out loud funny" concept. However, Iverson positively comments that the voice of Jillian by Drew Barrymore was perfect. Iverson added that it's "pretty humorous in this episode was how they made fun of mediocre films". In conclusion, Iverson gave the episode a final rating of 6.9/10. The press release for this episode commented that Jillian is a "very attractive but intellectually challenged", giving no negative comments. The entire scene of Buzz Killington discussing bridges to Peter and his friends in a flashback is Barrymore's favorite scene.
