= It Takes a Village Idiot, and I Married One =

- Family Guy episode
- Episode no.: Season 5 Episode 17
- Directed by: Zac Moncrief
- Written by: Alex Borstein
- Based on: Family Guy: It Takes a Village Idiot, and I Married One by: Alex Borstein; and Cherry Chevapravatdumrong
- Production code: 5ACX12
- Original air date: May 13, 2007

Guest appearances
- Jeff Bergman; Gary Cole; Jackson Douglas as Jason Voorhees; Keith Ferguson; Carrie Fisher as Angela; Masam Holden; Don Most as himself; Gary Newman; Keith Olbermann as Bob Grossbeard; Fred Tatasciore as Jim Varney; Adam West as Mayor West

Episode chronology
← Previous "No Chris Left Behind"	Next → "Meet the Quagmires"
- Family Guy season 5

"It Takes a Village Idiot, and I Married One" is the 17th episode of the fifth season of the animated comedy series Family Guy. It originally aired on Fox in the United States on May 13, 2007. The episode features Lois as she runs for Mayor of Quahog against incumbent Mayor Adam West, once she notices how polluted the local lake has become. Lois is elected as mayor and successfully cleans the lake, but quickly succumbs to corruption when the toxic-dump owner pressures her to let him resume dumping toxins into the lake.

The episode was directed by Zac Moncrief and written by cast member Alex Borstein (credited as a.bo) whose script was based on a one-woman show she had previously written that served as a tribute to Hillary Clinton; Borstein later wrote a novelization of the episode in collaboration with fellow series writer Cherry Chevapravatdumrong. The episode received mixed reviews from critics for its storyline and many cultural references. According to Nielsen ratings, it was viewed in 7.21 million homes in its original airing. The episode featured guest performances by Jeff Bergman, Gary Cole, Jackson Douglas, Keith Ferguson, Carrie Fisher, Masam Holden, Don Most, Gary Newman, Keith Olbermann, and Fred Tatasciore, along with several of the series' recurring guest-voice actors.

== Plot ==
The Griffin family decides to take a vacation at Quagmire's cabin at Lake Quahog. When they go swimming in the lake, they discover that an oil refinery is dumping toxic waste into it; as they flee the lake, their hair falls out, forcing them to wear powdered wigs until it grows back. Lois complains to Mayor Adam West, who admits that he sanctioned the dumping in exchange for free hair oil. Outraged at West's deliberate act of corruption, Lois decides to run against him in the upcoming mayoral election. Peter and his friends become strong supporters of Lois' campaign, realizing that they'd be able to get away with almost everything, should she become mayor. But Lois' campaign soon falters, as Mayor West proves more politically savvy. While Lois bores voters with detailed plans to improve the city, Mayor West uses glittering generalities and statements completely unrelated to the questions posed to him. Following Brian's advice to give short, simple answers, Lois resorts to similar tactics, dropping controversial terms such as "Jesus" and "9/11" in meaningless ways. She eventually gains the populace's support and wins the election.

After taking office, Lois attempts to propose a tax raise, though when this fails, begins to use fear tactics to raise funds to clean up the lake. Her efforts are successful, and life returns to the clean lake. She even has leftover cash afterwards, so she embezzles $600 to purchase a purse, much to Brian's disappointment. Peter has also succumbed to the perks of being the mayor's husband: he has rerouted the town's electrical system and caused rolling blackouts to bring late comedian Jim Varney back from the dead (he does nothing but talk, playing his character Ernest, and repeatedly refer to "Vern".) He then remembers he actually wanted John Belushi and takes Varney outside to shoot him, only for Varney to end up taking the gun from him and Peter running away from him warning Brian. Later, Lois is tempted to buy a $4,300 fur coat, and Bob Grossbeard, president of the local oil company, offers to buy it for her if she will allow him to dump his oil runoff in the lake. Lois reluctantly accepts his offer, but as the opening of the new runoff pipe begins, Lois realizes the error of her ways and closes the valve to the pipe and resigns her position as mayor, stating that she was consumed by money and power, which led her to become the very same things she set out to destroy.

West declares himself mayor again, but a random bystander points out that he has no jurisdiction to do so, and that the city has to have a whole new election to decide who gets to be the mayor of Quahog. This prompts West to pull out a gun and fatally shoot him, as well as two others whom he believes objected. Despite West's blatant act of assault with a deadly weapon and three homicides, no one in Quahog defends themselves against him, attempts to restrain him, or question his moral judgment to be mayor.

== Production ==
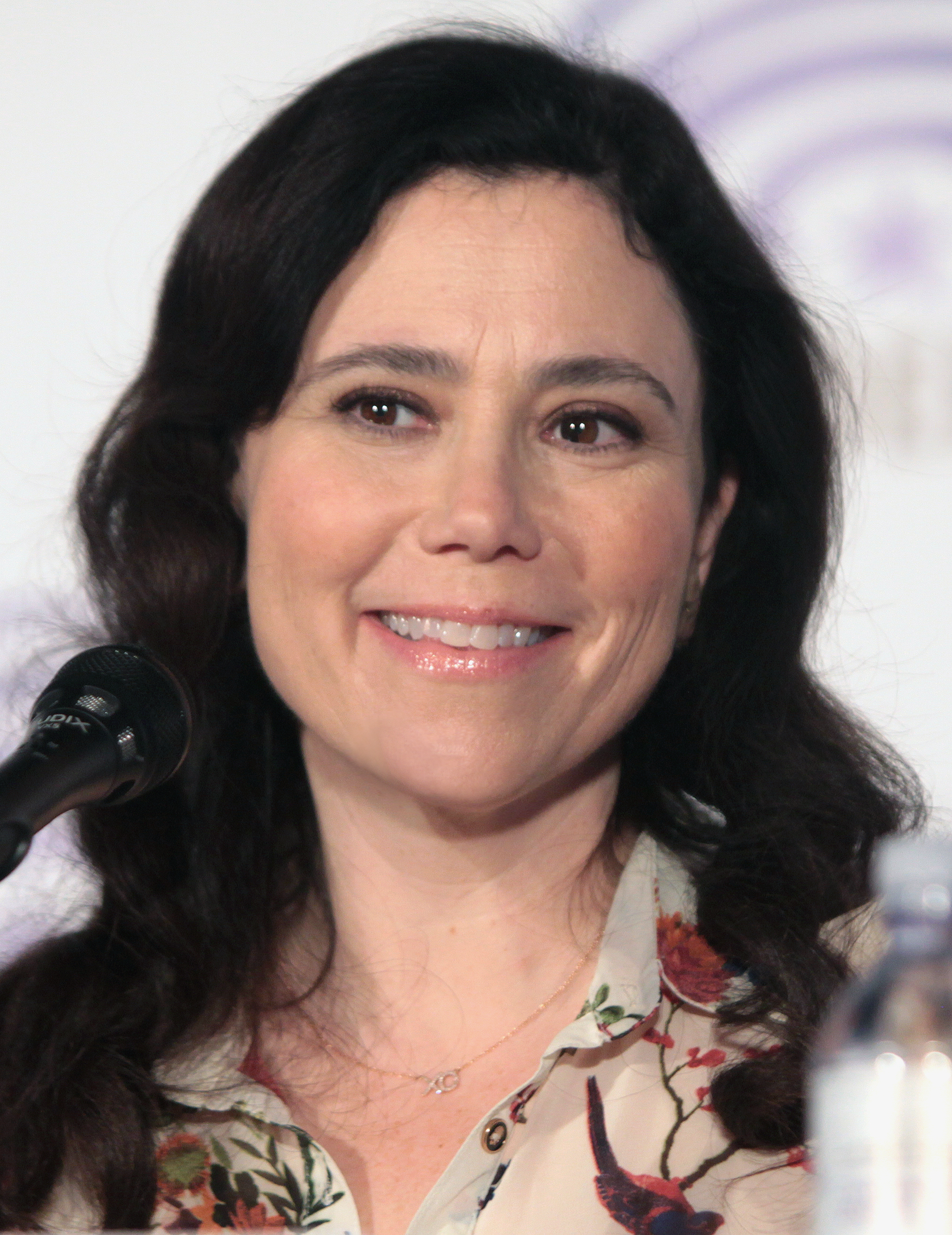
Alex Borstein wrote the episode.

The episode was written by Alex Borstein, under the pen name of "a.bo", and directed by Zac Moncrief. The story is based on a one-woman show Borstein worked on, entitled Women and Jews: Why We'll Never Be President. The storyline came out when she felt that a woman "will never be president," stating, "I had these fantasies about a woman president that would be fair and there'd be no corruption. That's a bunch of bullshit fantasy." Borstein called the episode "kind of my homage to Hillary Clinton." The staff enjoyed the episode's storyline so much, that Borstein and fellow series writer Cherry Chevapravatdumrong wrote a novelization of the episode. Borstein called the book a "companion piece poking fun" at Clinton's book It Takes a Village.

A scene in which Quagmire tells Peter he has been having sex with numerous women to persuade them into voting for Lois, he says: "If I tried to masturbate right now, you know what would come out? A little flag with the word 'bang' on it." This was altered in the Fox broadcast to be: "You know how many sperm I got left? One. He's all alone in there and he's scared." The scene was unchanged on Adult Swim and home releases. Another scene, featuring the Screaming Black Dolphins from "I Take Thee, Quagmire" was also cut from the broadcast version of the episode due to time constraints, but is included on DVD releases.

Gary Newman, President of 20th Century Fox, voiced a man in the audience when Lois held a press conference. Newman is responsible for Family Guy being renewed after its cancellation, and he had wanted to do a line on the show. In addition to Newman and the regular cast, voice actors Jeff Bergman, Keith Ferguson, and Fred Tatasciore, actors Gary Cole, Jackson Douglas, Carrie Fisher, Masam Holden, and Don Most, and news anchor and political commentator Keith Olbermann, also supplied voices. Recurring voice actors Lori Alan, Johnny Brennan, and Alex Breckenridge, and writers Mark Hentemann, Danny Smith, Alec Sulkin, and John Viener made minor appearances.

== Cultural references ==
In the episode's opening scene, the Griffins are traveling to Quagmire's cabin in the woods; Peter notes that it will be a better vacation than when they appeared in the American game show The Price Is Right pricing game Cliff Hangers. Cleveland is also shown playing the pricing game Plinko. As Stewie and Brian decide to go berry-picking in the forest, actor Don Most slowly rises from the fog nearby as a chorus sings about his role as Ralph on the ABC sitcom Happy Days.

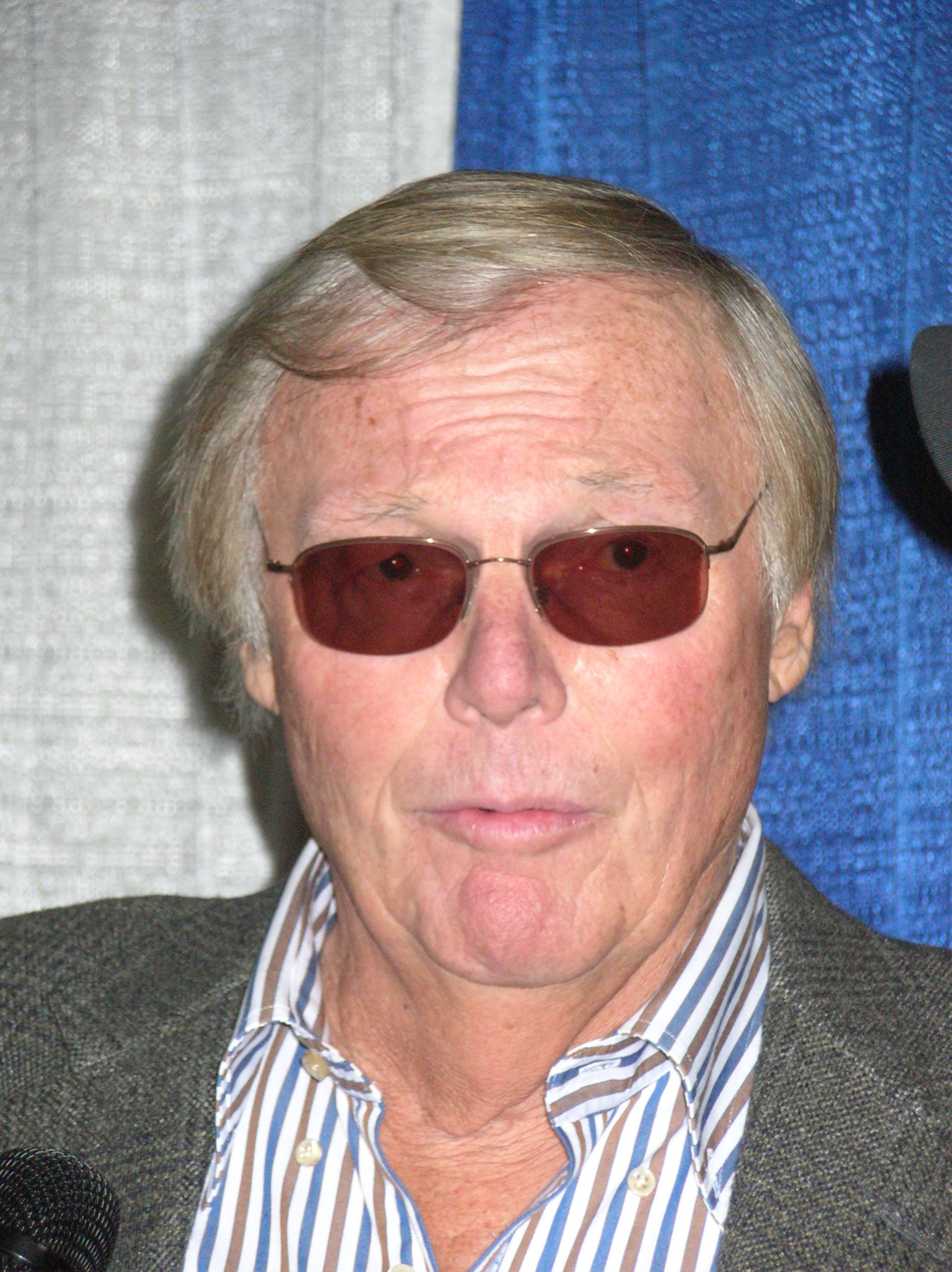
Adam West reprised his role as Mayor Adam West.

Having lost their hair from the lake's pollution, the Griffins are at home wearing powdered wigs, an effect that compels Stewie to play several classical compositions on a harpsichord, including those by Joseph Haydn and Georg Friedrich Handel, with Peter appearing as Antonio Salieri. The scene is a reference to the 1984 film Amadeus.

Preparing for Quahog's upcoming mayoral election, both Lois and incumbent Mayor Adam West participate in a debate hosted by Quahog 5 News. As Lois begins her second response, after first running out of time, she uses the September 11 attacks and Jesus to form her answers. The crowd reacts positively to her answers, with a live-action clip of "The Crying Girl" from season six of the American reality show American Idol also appearing on screen. Once Lois is elected, Brian mentions Lois' ability to connect with the citizens of Quahog, just as Disney is able to connect with their audience, with the 2004 film Home on the Range being shown. Going on to propose a "modest tax increase" to pay for the cleanup of the local lake, Lois resorts to fear tactics, by stating that Adolf Hitler and the Legion of Doom are planning to assassinate Jesus, using the lake as their base.

Abusing his wife's power as mayor, Peter begins by rerouting the city's electricity, causing rolling blackouts. When Brian questions Peter's actions, Peter reveals that he's been using the power to reanimate actor Jim Varney's corpse (he'd actually wanted to bring back actor and Saturday Night Live alumnus John Belushi).

Horror-movie legend Jason Voorhees from the Friday the 13th movie series appeared twice in this episode, carrying his trademark blood-drenched machete. First, Quahog news reporter Tricia Takanawa is interviewing him by the lake, during which he kills two bathing-suit-clad women. The scene references Camp Crystal Lake, Jason's traditional haunt. Later he appears as the boss of the store where Lois tries to buy her expensive coat; he threatens to kill his employee if she "screws up."

== Reception ==
In its original broadcast in the United States, the episode was watched by 7.21 million households and achieved a 3.5 rating and 9% share in the 18–49 demographic, according to Nielsen ratings. It ultimately finished third in its timeslot, after Desperate Housewives on ABC and a two-hour season finale of Survivor: Fiji on CBS. The episode attracted 740,000 fewer viewers than the previous episode, but made Family Guy the highest rated show in the Animation Domination block, ahead of King of the Hill, The Simpsons and American Dad!.

Since airing, the episode has received mixed reviews from critics. Brett Love of TV Squad noted that the story was very similar to the season two episode "Running Mates", but thought it was "pretty solid" with "some great moments." Ahsan Haque of IGN stated the episode had "quite a few funny jokes," but the storyline was "predictably unoriginal," and felt the "political statement [...] was stretched too thin," giving the episode a 6.8 out of 10.
