= No Meals on Wheels =

- Family Guy episode
- Episode no.: Season 5 Episode 14
- Directed by: Greg Colton
- Written by: Mike Henry
- Production code: 5ACX09
- Original air date: March 25, 2007

Guest appearances
- Barclay DeVeau; Keith Ferguson; Arnold McCuller as Maude singer; Patrick Stewart as himself; Ben Stiller as himself (uncredited)

Episode chronology
← Previous "Bill & Peter's Bogus Journey"	Next → "Boys Do Cry"
- Family Guy season 5

"No Meals on Wheels" is the 14th episode of the fifth season of the animated comedy series Family Guy. It originally aired on Fox in the United States on March 25, 2007. The episode features the Griffin family opening a restaurant, and eventually becoming overwhelmed by Joe Swanson and his wheelchair friends. With this, Peter decides to ban wheelchairs from their establishment, because they are "uncool". This causes Joe, along with his wheelchair-using friends to attempt to take back the restaurant, and prevent Peter from discriminating against them.

The episode was written by Mike Henry and directed by Greg Colton. It received mixed reviews from critics for its storyline and many cultural references, in addition to receiving criticism from the Parents Television Council. According to Nielsen ratings, it was viewed in 7.97 million homes in its original airing. The episode featured guest performances by Barclay DeVeau, Keith Ferguson, Arnold McCuller, Patrick Stewart and Ben Stiller, along with several guest voice actors for the series. "No Meals on Wheels" was released on DVD along with four other episodes from the season on October 21, 2008.

== Plot ==
Peter is annoyed by his friend Mort Goldman constantly borrowing his personal belongings that he creates a pseudo-effigy of Adolf Hitler (which he dubs a "scare-Jew") using his best suit to scare Mort away. Frustrated, Lois takes him to a thrift store to get a new suit, where Peter finds some flannel pajamas. Wearing the blanket pajamas constantly led to Peter discovering static electricity by rubbing his feet on the carpet. He annoys Lois enough for her to remove the carpet from their home with Quagmire's help. This leads the family to find an antique 18th century Rhode Island ship token, hidden under the carpet, which the family sells for $50,000. With the money, Peter and Lois decide to live their dream of owning a restaurant, naming it "Big Pete's House of Munch".

The Griffins' business has a shaky start until Joe promises to bring his friends to the restaurant. Peter is at first excited at the thought of his restaurant becoming the hangout for police officers, but eventually finds that Joe is actually bringing in fellow paraplegics. The restaurant becomes a huge success among handicapped customers, but Peter is disappointed that what was supposed to be a cool restaurant has become a "cafeteria to the veterans hospital". Taking the profits for granted, an angered Peter stubbornly bans them from entering with a "no handicapped customers" policy. This causes a strain on the friendship between Peter and Joe. In response, the handicapped unite into a giant robot known as "CrippleTron", which begins attacking the restaurant while Peter, Chris and Stewie are on the roof. Stewie eventually takes matters into his own hands and covers Joe's eyes to defeat CrippleTron, which destroys the restaurant and falls on Peter, thus breaking one of his legs. After being taken to the hospital, Peter, needing to use a wheelchair for two weeks while his broken leg heals, apologizes to Joe, who accepts, touched to see Peter understand the difficulties of being disabled.

== Production ==
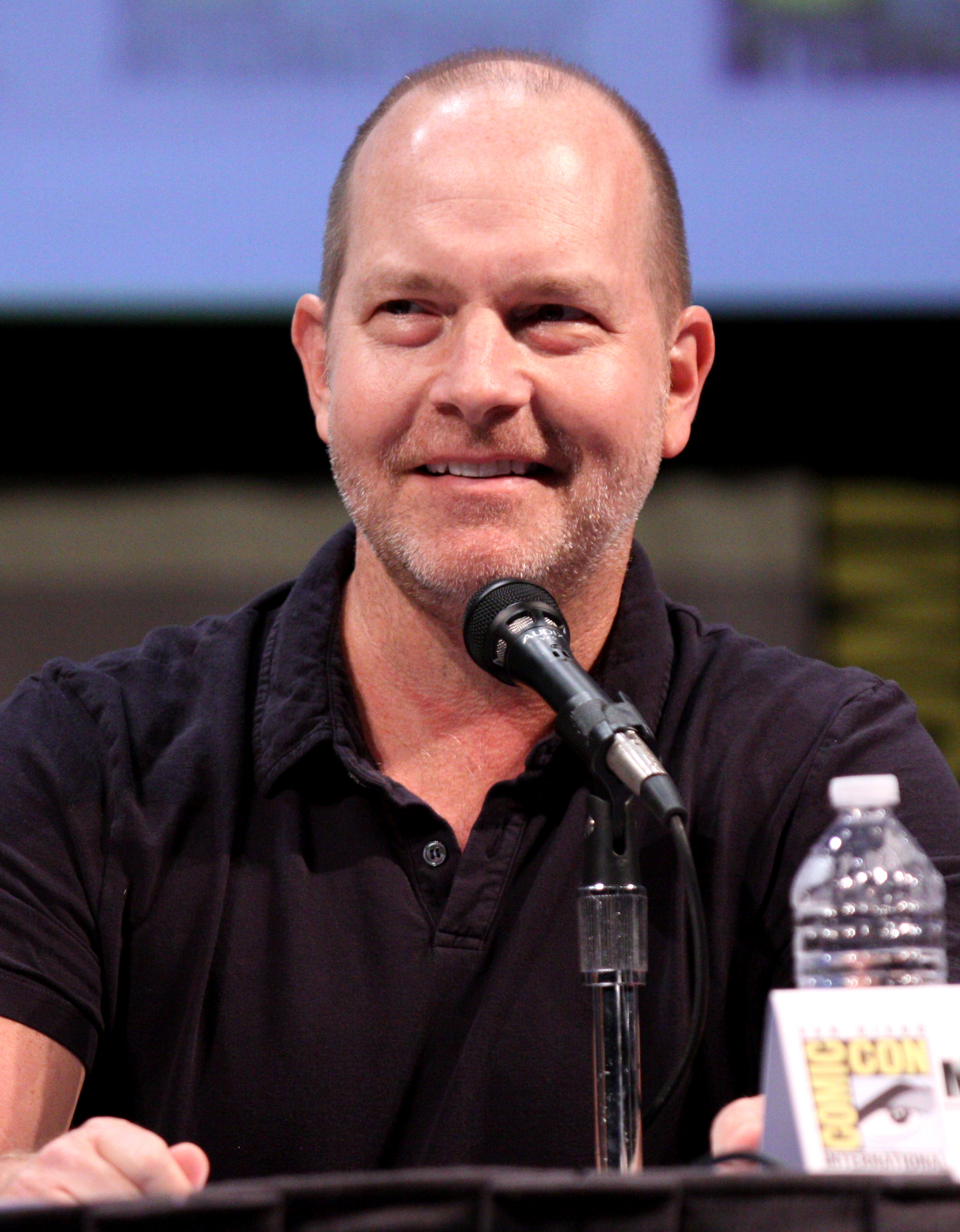
Mike Henry wrote the episode.

The episode was written by main cast member Mike Henry, who provides the voice for the Family Guy character Cleveland Brown, among others, and it was directed by series regular Greg Colton. In animating the Cripple-Tron sequence, Colton largely utilized computer technology to create the sequence, in addition to traditional animation and computer-generated imagery.

"No Meals on Wheels", along with the four other episodes from Family Guy's fifth season, were released on a three-disc DVD set in the United States on October 21, 2008. The sets included brief audio commentaries by Seth MacFarlane and various crew and cast members for several episodes, a collection of deleted scenes, a special mini-feature which discussed the process behind animating "100th Episode Special", and a mini-feature entitled Family Guy Live.

In addition to the regular cast, voice actor Barclay DeVeau, voice actor Keith Ferguson, singer Arnold McCuller and actor Patrick Stewart guest starred in the episode. Recurring guest voice actors Lori Alan, Johnny Brennan, writer Steve Callaghan, voice actor Chris Cox, writer Danny Smith, writer Alec Sulkin and writer John Viener also made minor appearances.

== Cultural references ==
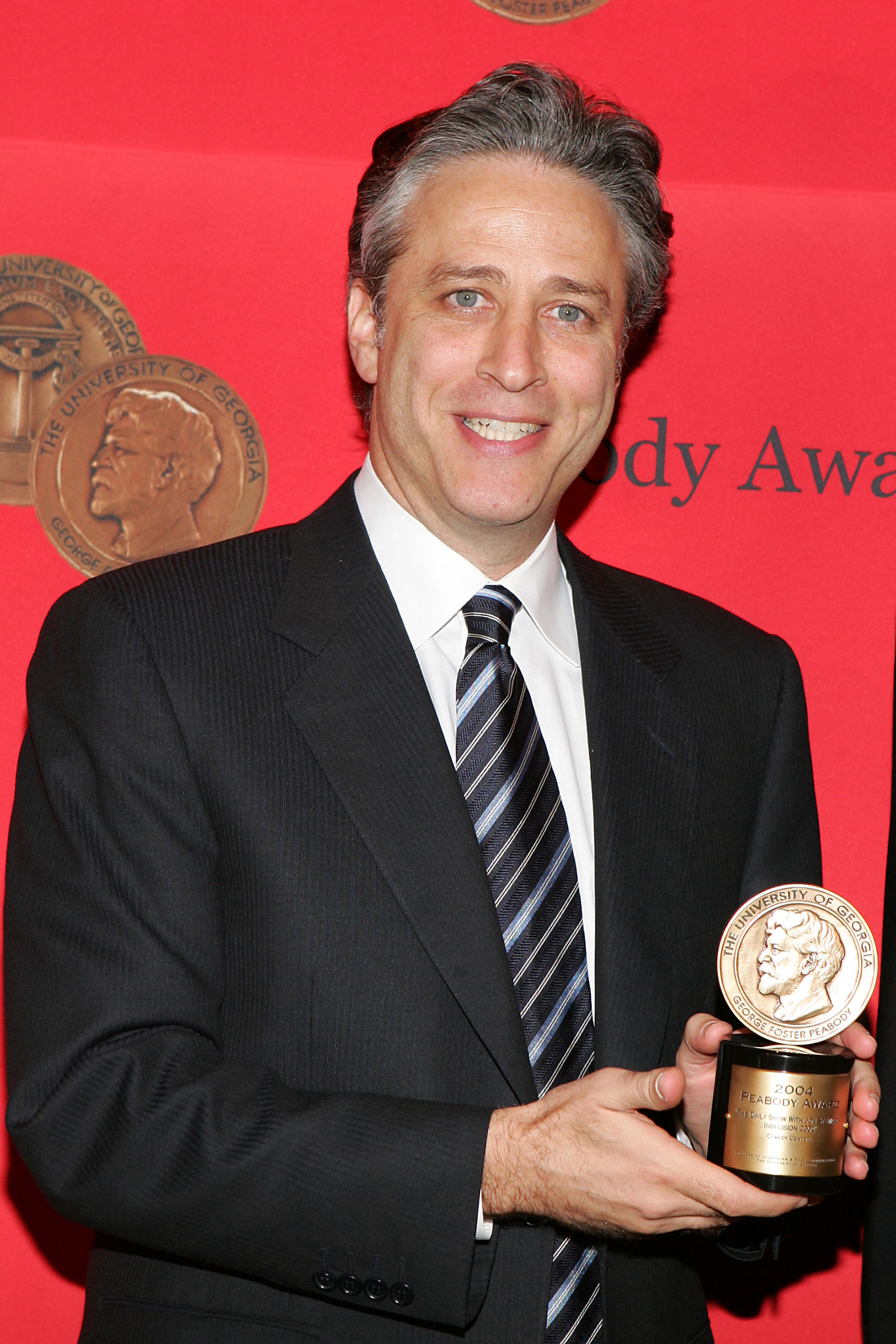
Comedian Jon Stewart was briefly referenced in the episode.

The episode opens with the Griffin family watching an episode of America's Next Top Model. The show's host, Tyra Banks, is also shown, becoming furious at a contestant, and a giant iguana emerges from her mouth. After Mort attempts to borrow something from the Griffin family, Peter states that Mort is more burdensome than the Mexican Super Friends. Deciding to scare him away, Peter then goes on to build a scarecrow that resembles former Nazi leader Adolf Hitler, which he names a "scare-Jew". This causes Mort to be scared from the family's home, and implores other Jews to protect Jon Stewart, being that he is their "most important Jew."

Annoyed by Peter's constant shocking, Brian professes his discomfort by referencing his anger after O. J. Simpson was acquitted of charges in the murders of his ex-wife Nicole Brown and Ronald Goldman, and the fact that his then-roommate was in support of Simpson. The statue of Peter on top of the restaurant is very similar in appearance to the statues seen at Big Boy Restaurants. After Lois expresses her hope for the restaurant to be successful, Stewie sarcastically states that it will be just as successful as Liza Minnelli's Playboy photoshoot. Returning home from the restaurant, Peter and Lois decide to watch an episode of Maude, but the length of the opening theme song causes Peter to become fatigued by the show. Once the restaurant begins hemorrhaging money, Peter decides to shoot a commercial parodying M. Night Shyamalan's 1999 film The Sixth Sense. After Joe's handicapped friends take over the restaurant, Peter expresses his discomfort about the restaurant's coolness to Lois by retrieving a picture of American actor Mark Harmon and showing it to Lois in an attempt to make her understand his concern.

Once Peter becomes handicapped, a montage of his difficulties as a paraplegic is shown, with Elton John's "I Guess That's Why They Call It the Blues" playing in the background. In the final scene of the episode, Peter decides to apologize to Joe for attempting to discriminate him for being handicapped. Accepting his apology, Joe invites Peter to join him and Bonnie while they watch the ABC medical drama Grey's Anatomy.

Additionally, M.C. Escher was also included in a cutaway gag in this episode, after Peter said that the new paraplegia-attracting restaurant was weirder than a rap song made by him parodying MC Hammer in "U Can't Touch This" rapping in Escher's Relativity, with him saying "Goin' up the stairs, and Goin' down the stairs, and Goin' up the stairs, and Goin' down the stairs, and Goin' up the sideways stairs". It's lyrics briefly summarized Escher's art style mentioning stairs and "sideways stairs". A remix of this song was included in a song by JomJom412 sampling the "No Signal" scene from Kane Parsons' Backrooms, and a heavy usage of a scene in Season 2 Episode 14.

== Reception ==
In a slight decrease from the previous week, the episode was viewed in 7.97 million homes in its original airing, according to Nielsen ratings, in the United States. The episode also acquired a 2.8 rating in the 18–49 demographic, slightly edging out The Simpsons, in addition to significantly winning over series creator Seth MacFarlane's second show on Fox, American Dad!, in both rating and total viewership. It was the 35th most-watched episode of the week.

Reviews of the episode were mostly mixed, stating that the episode had "its moments, [...] but as a whole, it was somewhat lacking." Ahsan Haque of IGN found it to be "one of the most bizarre and tasteless episodes of the season." Furthermore, Haque noted, "as with almost every episode of Family Guy, the plot takes many strange twists and turns. That often this leads to a muddled story with no sense of direction." Haque also stated, that he was "amused by Peter's static shocking escapade" and "liked the restaurant themed story angle," saying that it was well executed. Overall, Haque finally noted that the episode managed to recapture some of the show's "so-offensive-you-have-to-groan" feel that was prevalent during the first few seasons. The fight with the Cripple-Tron ranked tenth position on IGN's Top 10 Fights in the show. Brett Love of TV Squad found the cultural references to be a "mixed bag," but noted his enjoyment of the restaurant scenes, as well as Quagmire's brief appearance. In closing his review, Love stated, "Overall, this one just didn't work for me. It's worth a look for a couple of the bits, but not an episode I'll watch when it gets repeated. [...] They can't all be gems."

The Parents Television Council, which has frequently criticized the series, named the episode the "Worst TV Show of the Week" for the week ending April 6, 2007, for its insensitivity toward the disabled, as well as its gag depicting Adolf Hitler as a scarecrow, or "Scare-Jew," as it was referred to in the episode.
