= Family Guy season 5 =

Season of television series

Family Guy
- Season 5
- DVD covers for Volumes 5 and 6
- Showrunners: David A. Goodman; Chris Sheridan
- Starring: Seth MacFarlane; Alex Borstein; Seth Green; Mila Kunis; Mike Henry
- No. of episodes: 18

Release
- Original network: Fox
- Original release: September 10, 2006 – May 20, 2007

Season chronology
- ← Previous; Season 4 Next → Season 6

The fifth season of Family Guy first aired on the Fox network in eighteen episodes from September 10, 2006, to May 20, 2007, before being released as two DVD box sets and in syndication. It premiered with the episode "Stewie Loves Lois" and finished with "Meet the Quagmires". The series follows the dysfunctional Griffin family—father Peter, mother Lois, daughter Meg, son Chris, baby Stewie and Brian, the family pet, who reside in their hometown of Quahog, a fictional city in the U.S. state of Rhode Island. The executive producers for the fifth season were David Goodman, Chris Sheridan, Danny Smith and series creator Seth MacFarlane. Sheridan and Goodman served as showrunners for the fifth season.

The season received positive reviews from critics, who praised that the series saw "no sign of tiring", and had "as many funny moments as ever." Some criticism cited of a lack of original writing.

Season five contains some of the series' most acclaimed episodes, including "Barely Legal", "Airport '07" and "No Chris Left Behind". The fifth season won an Annie Award at the 35th Annie Awards for storyboarding and was nominated for three more, including writing and voice acting. It also won a Primetime Emmy Award for Outstanding Individual Achievement in Animation.

The Volume Five DVD box set was released in Region 1 on September 18, 2007, Region 2 on October 15, 2007, and Region 4 on November 25, 2009. Thirteen of the eighteen episodes are included in the volume. The remaining five episodes of the season were released on the Volume Six DVD box set, released in Region 1 on October 21, 2008, Region 2 on November 10, 2008, and Region 4 on November 25, 2009.

== Voice cast and characters ==
- Seth MacFarlane as Peter Griffin, Brian Griffin, Stewie Griffin, Glenn Quagmire, Tom Tucker, Carter Pewterschmidt
- Alex Borstein as Lois Griffin, Tricia Takanawa, Barbara Pewterscmidt
- Seth Green as Chris Griffin, Neil Goldman
- Mila Kunis as Meg Griffin
- Mike Henry as Cleveland Brown, Herbert

=== Supporting characters ===
- Drew Barrymore as Jillian
- Gary Cole as Principal Shepherd
- Phyllis Diller as Thelma Griffin
- Carrie Fisher as Angela
- Phil LaMarr as Ollie Williams
- Natasha Melnick as Ruth
- Patrick Warburton as Joe Swanson
- Adam West as Mayor Adam West
- Lisa Wilhoit as Connie D'Amico

== Episodes ==
No. overall	No. in season	Title	Directed by	Written by	Original release date	Prod. code	U.S. viewers (millions)
81	1	"Stewie Loves Lois"	Mike Kim	Mark Hentemann	September 10, 2006	4ACX32	9.93
Quahog succumbs to a flu epidemic, and vaccinations are in short supply. While attempting to receive one from Dr. Elmer Hartman, the Griffin family doctor, Peter is informed he is in need of a prostate exam, but leaves the exam immediately under the belief that the doctor had attempted to rape him. He decides to sue the doctor, to the disbelief of Brian and Lois. Upon later discovering he has developed prostate cancer, he reaches an agreement with the doctor: if he drops all charges, Dr. Hartman will diagnose Peter's problem. Meanwhile, Stewie begins to admire Lois, after she rescued his beloved teddy bear, Rupert, from a vicious dog, and repaired it. As he becomes increasingly dependent on her, she attempts a hands-off parenting approach, ultimately leading Stewie to return to his old ways after she refuses to respond to his need for attention.
82	2	"Mother Tucker"	James Purdum	Tom Devanney	September 17, 2006	4ACX31	9.23
While attending the Quahog Airshow, the Griffins lose Stewie. A passing radio worker consults Brian over the prospect of beginning a stint as a radio host, after hearing him call for Stewie over the loud-speaker. Brian then begins his radio career, but is told to seek the aid of Stewie, after he had made a prank call to Brian while he was on the air, much to his annoyance. Meanwhile, Thelma Griffin, Peter's mother, visits the household, telling Peter she has split up with his father, Francis Griffin, to Peter's dismay. She begins a sexual relationship with local news anchorman Tom Tucker, but the couple break up just as Peter is beginning to adapt to having a new father. Brian later resigns from his radio career for unspecified reasons after Gore Vidal walks into one of his shows.
83	3	"Hell Comes to Quahog"	Dan Povenmire	Kirker Butler	September 24, 2006	4ACX33	9.66
After Peter fails to pick up Meg from the skating rink, she demands that Peter and Lois allow her to buy a car. Despite Meg showing an interest in a station wagon, Peter uses her money to buy a military tank. After he repeatedly uses it to destroy objects in the neighborhood, Joe Swanson impounds it. Meanwhile, a new shop is being built, Superstore USA. When it opens, Quahog begins to suffer from frequent power outages, due to the store's increasing demand for electricity. Small businesses in the town also begin to go out of business. After looking for a job, Meg is employed by the store, despite Peter leading protests outside. When Peter is persuaded by the store to become an employee, Brian decides to destroy the store. He obtains the tank and, alongside Stewie, destroys the store from the inside out, and regular living circumstances are restored to the town.
84	4	"Saving Private Brian"	Cyndi Tang	Cherry Chevapravatdumrong	November 5, 2006	4ACX34	8.45
Chris decides he wants to join the United States Army after a presentation by the organization at his school. After telling the family over dinner in the evening, Brian stops at the army recruitment office the following day, when taking Stewie out of the house, but Stewie decides to sign the pair of them up for the army when Brian leaves to top-off the parking meter. Brian becomes stressed with the army training, and later decides he is going to leave, but is persuaded otherwise by Stewie. In an attempt to distract Chris from joining the army, Peter gets Chris a role in a gothic school band, which turns Chris into a rude child. Brian then successfully completes the training with Stewie, and the pair are sent to serve in Iraq, where, upon discovering they do not want to be there, attempt to get themselves dismissed. After this fails, a message comes through telling them that the war is over, and that they are free to go home.
85	5	"Whistle While Your Wife Works"	Greg Colton	Steve Callaghan	November 12, 2006	4ACX35	9.04
Quagmire returns from a vacation in Florida, smuggling fireworks back in his anus. When playing with the fireworks, Peter ends up holding one of the lit firecrackers, and it explodes, blowing off several of his fingers in the process. His fingers are reattached by hospital staff, but Peter begins to fall behind at work, so he requests that Lois do his work for him, after being threatened with the prospect of dismissal if he does not catch up. Peter attempts on numerous occasions to seduce Lois, resulting in her eventually giving in, and having sex with him in his office. Meanwhile, Brian begins dating Jillian, an attractive, but "dumb" young woman; much to the enjoyment of Stewie. Persuaded by Stewie to end the relationship, due to her lack of intelligence, Brian goes to her house, but ends up having sex with her, rather than breaking up.
86	6	"Prick Up Your Ears"	James Purdum	Cherry Chevapravatdumrong	November 19, 2006	5ACX01	9.30
After finding Chris and his friends watching pornography in his bedroom, Lois tells Chris to speak to his sex-education teacher if he is curious about sex, but is shocked to learn that the school does not have one, due to budget constraints. She applies for the role and is accepted, but is quickly fired due to parents protesting outside the school. The school then hires a Reverend to teach the children not to have sex before marriage. In agreement to the Reverend's teaching, the students of James Woods High establish 'ear sex,' much to Lois's chagrin after she catches Meg and her new boyfriend, Doug, engaging in the act. Later, during another assembly presented by the Reverend, Lois takes over the assembly and tells the children that sex is not wrong and is acceptable before marriage if they are ready. The children realize how they have been brainwashed, and agree with Lois. Meg's new boyfriend soon ends his relationship with her, leaving Meg distraught. Meanwhile, Stewie decides to capture the tooth fairy for stealing his baby teeth, after they had fallen out, but is unable to do so.
87	7	"Chick Cancer"	Pete Michels	Alec Sulkin & Wellesley Wild	November 26, 2006	5ACX02	9.49
When watching television with Brian, Stewie discovers his old friend, Olivia, a female actress, is coming to Quahog in an attempt to boost her Hollywood career. Stewie insists Brian should take him to the mall to ridicule her when she arrives, but he instantly begins to fall in love with her. At first, she does not feel the same way, but decides to date Stewie when he attempts to act in a more mature manner. The couple get married with Stewie's teddy bear, Rupert, as the minister, but Stewie becomes irritable at Olivia after she flirts with one of her old friends at a party. After walking in on Olivia cheating with the child from the party, he leaves the house in anger and decides to set fire to it, leaving Olivia and her new partner to burn. Meanwhile, Peter decides to make a 'chick flick' after being inspired by a movie Lois had asked him to watch with her.
88	8	"Barely Legal"	Zac Moncrief	Kirker Butler	December 17, 2006	5ACX03	8.91
After Mayor West deploys the entire Quahog Police Department to Cartagena, Colombia, after watching Romancing the Stone, Joe is left behind due to Colombia "not being accessible for those in wheelchairs." Peter, Cleveland and Quagmire offer to become police officers after Joe sets up an emergency training school. Meanwhile, after seeing Meg upset at not getting a date for the Junior prom and threatening suicide, Brian offers to take her there, to her agreement. After kissing her while at the prom, Meg begins to fall in love with Brian, despite Brian not feeling the same way. After he tells Lois about kissing Meg at the prom, she repeatedly hits him and tells him to set things straight with her. Brian then decides to tell Meg that they will never be a couple, to which she eventually takes Brian to an undisclosed location and attempts to seduce him after she had tied him to a chair. As she is attempting this, Quahog's new police force, and Lois, stop Meg and Quagmire invites her to his house to have a heart-to-heart talk with her about relationships.
89	9	"Road to Rupert"	Dan Povenmire	Patrick Meighan	January 28, 2007	5ACX04	8.80
The Griffins have a yard sale, but Brian inadvertently sells Stewie's beloved teddy bear, Rupert, to a neighbor. Distraught at the prospect of losing Rupert, Stewie tracks him down, but when they find the neighbor's house, it is empty. As they leave, they see a moving truck pulling away, and hitch a ride with Mayor West, asking him to follow the truck. West agrees, but stops outside the border to Connecticut, refusing to enter, due to his personal beliefs. As they leave the car, a box falls from the moving truck with the new address on it. After discovering the buyer, Sanford, is moving to Aspen, Colorado, Stewie and Brian rent a helicopter to travel across the mountains. Upon arriving, the two discover Sanford's reluctance to give Stewie the bear, and so they both challenge him to a ski race down the mountain, agreeing that if Stewie wins, he can get Rupert back. After losing the race, Stewie then grabs the bear from Sanford's child; then he and Brian carjack a passing motorist to return to Quahog.
90	10	"Peter's Two Dads"	Cyndi Tang	Danny Smith	February 11, 2007	5ACX05	7.97
Lois and Peter forget Meg's upcoming birthday, and have to be reminded about it by Chris. They organize a party in the house, with Peter as a clown. After excessive drinking, Peter attempts to ride a unicycle down the stairs, but falls and lands on his father, Francis, crushing him and later killing him. Upset at his father's death, Peter decides to give up drinking, but quickly replaces it with crack. After being referred to a hypnotherapist by Brian, Peter recalls his father telling him as a child that he is not his biological father. Consulting with his mother afterwards, Peter discovers his father lives in the Republic of Ireland. Peter and Brian decide to travel there to meet him, only to discover Peter's real father is the town drunk. Meanwhile, after Lois spanks him but feels guilty and does not want to hurt him again, Stewie discovers he suffers from masochism and enjoys being hit.
91	11	"The Tan Aquatic with Steve Zissou"	Julius Wu	Mark Hentemann	February 18, 2007	5ACX06	8.53
Stewie develops a tan due to Peter's neglect while golfing, much to Lois's annoyance. Stewie is fond of the tan, and begins visiting tanning stores, as well as purchasing a tanning bed for his own bedroom. After asking Brian to wake him up after a short period of time in the tanning bed, Brian falls asleep, and Stewie is severely burnt after being in the bed for more than six hours. After his skin peels, Stewie decides to give up his tan, but discovers a mole on his stomach. Brian immediately takes him to Dr. Hartman so that tests can be performed on the mole. While awaiting the results over several days, Stewie believes he is dying, and asks Brian to assist him in fulfilling a list of final requests. Stewie later learns the mole is not cancerous, and he will survive, but still requests Brian's help in fulfilling his list of final requests. Meanwhile, Chris is bullied by Kyle, a new paper boy who is stealing his customers. Annoyed at Kyle for picking on Chris, Peter beats him up, but discovers bullying is fun, and begins to bully his friends. After preparing to beat up Randy, another child who bullied Peter as a young boy, he is stopped by Chris and is convinced that what he is doing is wrong.
92	12	"Airport '07"	John Holmquist	Tom Devanney	March 4, 2007	5ACX08	8.59
After attending a redneck comedy show, Peter purchases a pickup truck and decides to become a redneck. Peter begins behaving as if he were a redneck, eventually painting over the entire rear window of his pickup, which results in him reversing the car into his neighbor Quagmire's car. After destroying the car, Peter drives Quagmire to the airport, as he is due to fly an airplane. While at the airport, Peter steals the fuel used for Quagmire's airplane, naively believing it will make his pickup fly, resulting in Quagmire's plane crashing safely shortly after, due to a lack of fuel. As a result, Quagmire loses his job and is forced to live with the Griffins until he can find another place to work. Peter claims he is no longer going to be a redneck, although this fails to comfort Quagmire over his loss. The group then sets out to get Quagmire his job back by incapacitating the pilots of another plane, causing it to need to be rescued by Quagmire, making him a town hero. The plan backfires, however, as Quagmire does not get on the plane in time. Quagmire eventually contacts Peter, Cleveland and Joe via air traffic control and instructs Peter on landing the plane safely. The plan succeeded and Quagmire got his job back, even though Peter took responsibility for hijacking accusations.
93	13	"Bill & Peter's Bogus Journey"	Dominic Polcino	Steve Callaghan	March 11, 2007	5ACX07	8.05
After being attacked by an octopus at the aquarium, Peter decides to become physically fit, and spends a mere fifteen minutes at the gym, then believing that he is now fit. Later, former U.S. president Bill Clinton's car breaks down outside their house, and Peter, thinking he is strong enough, attempts to lift the car without a jack, which results in him getting a sudden severe hernia and being hospitalized. Depressed at the concept of becoming old, he confides in Clinton, after he visits Peter in the hospital, who tells Peter that age is only a state of mind. When Peter recovers, Bill takes him out to help him realize he can still have fun, but things eventually get out of hand when they start smoking marijuana, then steal things and cause mischief while high. Meanwhile, Stewie and Brian attempt to be toilet trained by buying an instructional video hosted by Roy Scheider (appearing as himself), but Brian persists to leave his feces in the garden, thus making Lois force him to wear a diaper.
94	14	"No Meals on Wheels"	Greg Colton	Mike Henry	March 25, 2007	5ACX09	7.97
Peter is irritated by Mort, the local pharmacist in Quahog, constantly borrowing his things, so he makes a "Scare-Jew" out of his best suit. Frustrated, Lois takes him to a secondhand clothing store to get a new suit, where Peter finds some flannel pajamas. While wearing them, he begins to notice that he can shock people with static electricity by rubbing his feet on the carpet. Annoyed by this, Lois has the carpet completely removed. When this is done, they find an 18th-century Rhode Island ship token, which the family sells for $50,000.
95	15	"Boys Do Cry"	Brian Iles	Cherry Chevapravatdumrong	April 29, 2007	5ACX10	8.13
Lois gets a job as the new organist for the church, which causes her to decide to persuade her family to start attending mass on Sundays. After Stewie mistakes Communion wine for punch, he drinks too much and vomits; the town of Quahog then believes Stewie to be possessed by Satan (since according to Roman Catholic theology the wine is the blood of Christ, and Satan would reject it). When the priest wants to exorcise him, aided by the entire town, the Griffin family escapes to Lois' sister Carol's house in Texas. While there, the family adapts to the Texan lifestyle, and Stewie enters a beauty pageant. Peter also becomes friends with ranchers, and after admitting to them that he is considered "mentally retarded", the ranchers attempt to kill him by execution in an electric chair. He is saved however, and the family then returns home to Quahog after the search for Stewie is called to an end.
96	16	"No Chris Left Behind"	Pete Michels	Patrick Meighan	May 6, 2007	5ACX11	7.95
Lois takes the family out to the ballet Swan Lake on a late school night. As Chris studies at the breakfast table for an upcoming exam the next morning, Brian notices that Chris' history textbook is hopelessly out of date (published in 1896 in the Adult Swim version of the show, 1948 in the Fox version). Upset by this, Lois goes to a PTA meeting to complain. The high school principal, Principal Shepherd, explains that the school cannot afford new textbooks because the school lost its federal funding due to low test scores, as a result of the "No Child Left Behind Act." His solution for raising the school's performance average is to expel the dumbest student, who happens to be Chris.
97	17	"It Takes a Village Idiot, and I Married One"	Zac Moncrief	Alex Borstein	May 13, 2007	5ACX12	7.22
The Griffin family vacations at Quagmire's cabin. While the family goes swimming in Lake Quahog, they discover that a nearby oil refinery is dumping toxic waste into the lake. As the family flees from the lake, they become almost completely hairless. They are ultimately forced to wear wigs until their hair grows back, and once it does, Lois complains to Mayor Adam West, who admits that he sanctioned the dumping in exchange for free oil for his hair. Outraged, Lois decides to run against West in the upcoming mayoral election. Peter and his friends, meanwhile, become strong supporters of Lois' campaign, realizing that they could get away with anything because of their relations to Lois if she becomes mayor. As such, they do everything in their power to gain the town's support so that she can win the race. Lois is then elected, and succumbs to pressure by the toxic dump owner to allow him to resume dumping in the lake. Lois then decides to resign, and West then become mayor again, after agreeing to "play ball" with the waste dump owner.
98	18	"Meet the Quagmires"	Dan Povenmire & Chris Robertson	Mark Hentemann	May 20, 2007	5ACX13	9.15
After hearing Quagmire brag about his sexual exploits, Peter feels that he has missed out on enjoying the single lifestyle. Death is summoned to The Drunken Clam on a false alarm, and he grants Peter's wish by sending him (along with Brian) back to 1984 for one night. Appearing to others as his 18-year-old self, Peter cancels his scheduled movie date to see Zapped! with Lois Pewterschmidt, instead accepting an invitation from Cleveland to go and party at a bar. Peter enjoys the evening, and ends up making out with actress Molly Ringwald, when Death appears to return him to the present. Back in the present day, Peter then discovers that his past actions have had drastic effects on the world; he and Molly have been married for 20 years, Lois is married to Quagmire, Al Gore is president instead of former U.S. president George W. Bush, Chris, Meg, and Stewie have Quagmire's chin, nose, and mannerisms, Dick Cheney, who is just known as the chairman of Halliburton, has just shot dead Antonin Scalia, Karl Rove, and Tucker Carlson, and finally, Chevy Chase is the host of The Tonight Show. Brian explains to Peter that by missing out on his date with Lois and making out with Molly, he altered the time line. At the end of the episode, Peter says "I'm just glad everything is back to normal" and then Roger the Alien from American Dad! walks in and says "Who ate all the pecan sandies?"

== Production ==
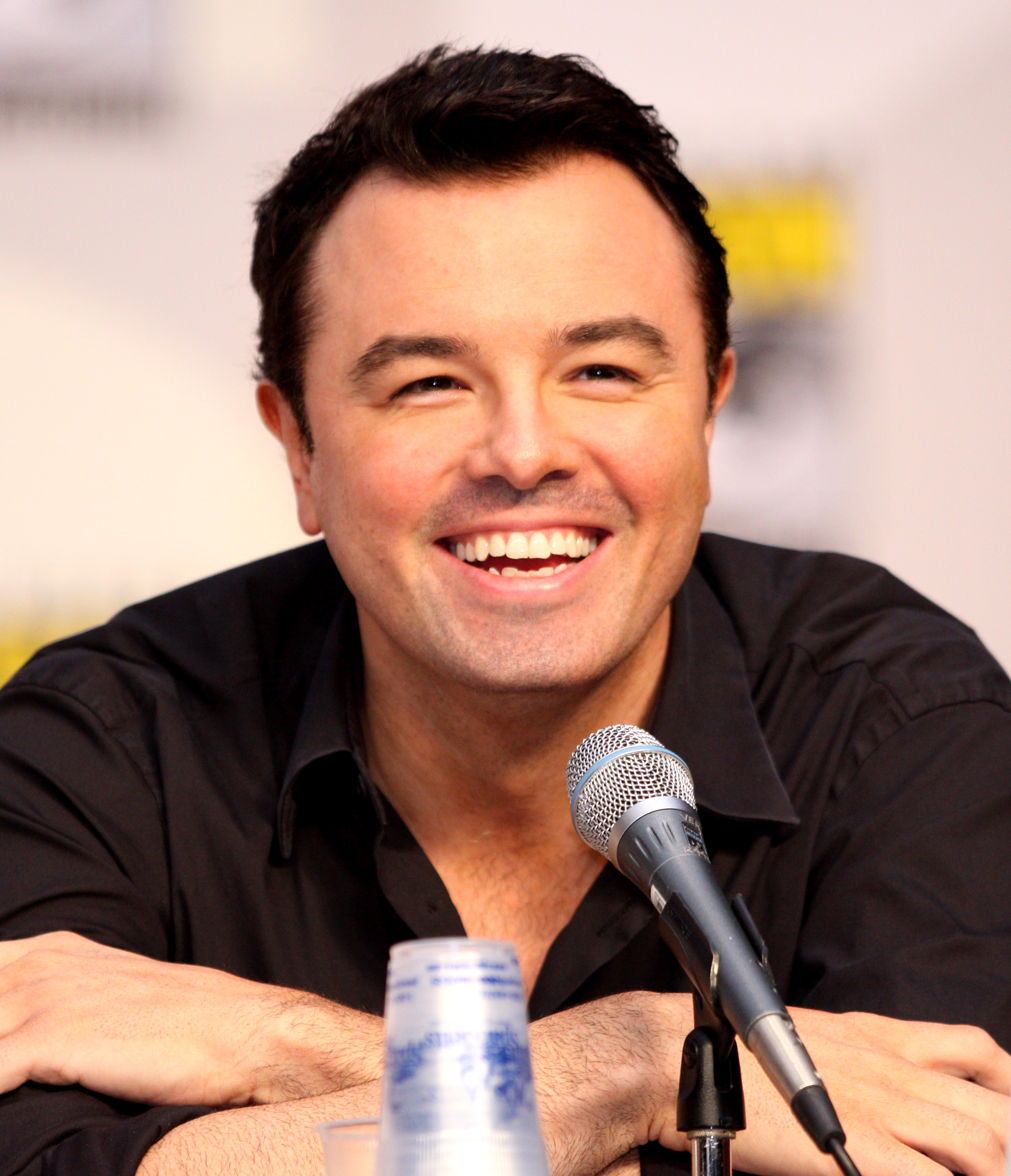
Seth MacFarlane served as executive producer for the season.

Production for the fifth season began in 2005, during the airing of the fourth season. The season was executive produced by series regulars David A. Goodman, Seth MacFarlane, Chris Sheridan, and Danny Smith. In addition, Goodman served as showrunner throughout the season.

As production began, Tom Devanney, Kirker Butler, Cherry Chevapravatdumrong, Alec Sulkin, Wellesley Wild, Patrick Meighan, Danny Smith, and future showrunners Mark Hentemann and Steve Callaghan all stayed on from the previous season. No new writers were hired after the conclusion of the fourth season. Alex Borstein, who serves as the voice of Lois, wrote her last episode, "It Takes a Village Idiot, and I Married One", and regular writers Ken Goin and Gary Janetti, who returned during season eight, left the series before the beginning of the fifth season.

Julius Wu and Brian Iles received their first directing credits this season. Mike Kim, James Purdum, Cyndi Tang, Greg Colton, Pete Michels, Zac Moncrief, John Holmquist and future Blue Harvest director Dominic Polcino all also stayed with the show from the previous season. This season, however, was director Dan Povenmire's last season before leaving the show to create his own series, entitled Phineas and Ferb, which would be nominated for three Emmy Awards.

The main cast consisted of Seth MacFarlane (Peter Griffin, Stewie Griffin, Brian Griffin, Quagmire, Tom Tucker), Alex Borstein (Lois Griffin, Loretta Brown, Tricia Takanawa, Barbara Pewterschmidt), Mila Kunis (Meg Griffin), Seth Green (Chris Griffin, Neil Goldman) and Mike Henry (Cleveland Brown, Herbert).

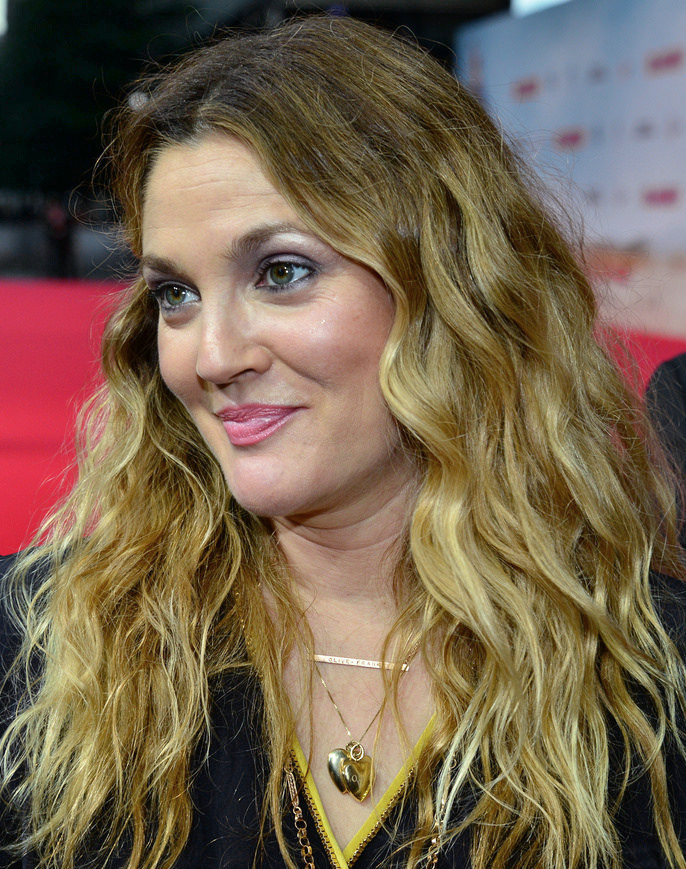
Drew Barrymore provided the voice of Jillian for five episodes in the season.

New recurring characters were also introduced in season five. The character of Jillian Fisher, Brian's new dimwitted girlfriend, was introduced in the episode "Whistle While Your Wife Works". She provided an ironic counterpoint to Brian's intellectualism. Her final character personality was designed to be a stereotypical blonde, "a bulimic cheerleader," and "not the brightest bauble on the tree." Her voice would later play upon the bulimic cheerleader element, with actress Drew Barrymore providing the voice of Jillian in eight episodes, five of which would be in season five. Other guest stars who made multiple appearances as recurring characters from previous seasons were Carrie Fisher as Peter's boss, Angela, and Phyllis Diller as Peter's mother. Seth MacFarlane's sister, Rachael MacFarlane, also made an appearance as Olivia, the child actress, when her character was apparently killed by Stewie in the episode "Chick Cancer".

The season ends just short of the series' 100th episode, which presents the funniest clips of the previous 99 episodes. The decision to end the fifth season before the 100th episode was made due to Fox executives' desire to show the Family Guy special "Blue Harvest" as the sixth-season premiere, which was still unfinished, at the end of the fifth season in May 2007.

== Reception ==
The fifth-season premiere "Stewie Loves Lois" received a 3.5 rating share in the Nielsen ratings among viewers age 18 to 49, attracting 9.93 million viewers overall, the highest rated episode of the entire season. Both of these figures significantly built upon numbers set by the fourth season finale. In the weeks following "Stewie Loves Lois", viewership ratings hovered just over 8 million. Aside from the premiere, "Hell Comes to Quahog", the third episode for the season, garnered the most viewers thereafter with 9.66 million, a high for the fifth season. While the episode "It Takes a Village Idiot, and I Married One" received the lowest number of viewers for the season with 7.22 million.

Episodes of the fifth season won several awards, including a Primetime Emmy Award. "No Chris Left Behind", which won for Outstanding Individual Achievement in Animation, became the third episode of the series to win an Emmy Award, and was awarded to Steven Fonti for his storyboard work in the episode. In addition, that same episode won an Annie Award for Storyboarding in an Animated Television Production. The season was nominated for three other Annie Awards—Character Animation in a Television Production (Eileen Kohlhepp for the series itself), Voice Acting in an Animated Television Production (Mila Kunis for "Barely Legal"), and Writing in an Animated Television Production (Kirker Butler for "Barely Legal").

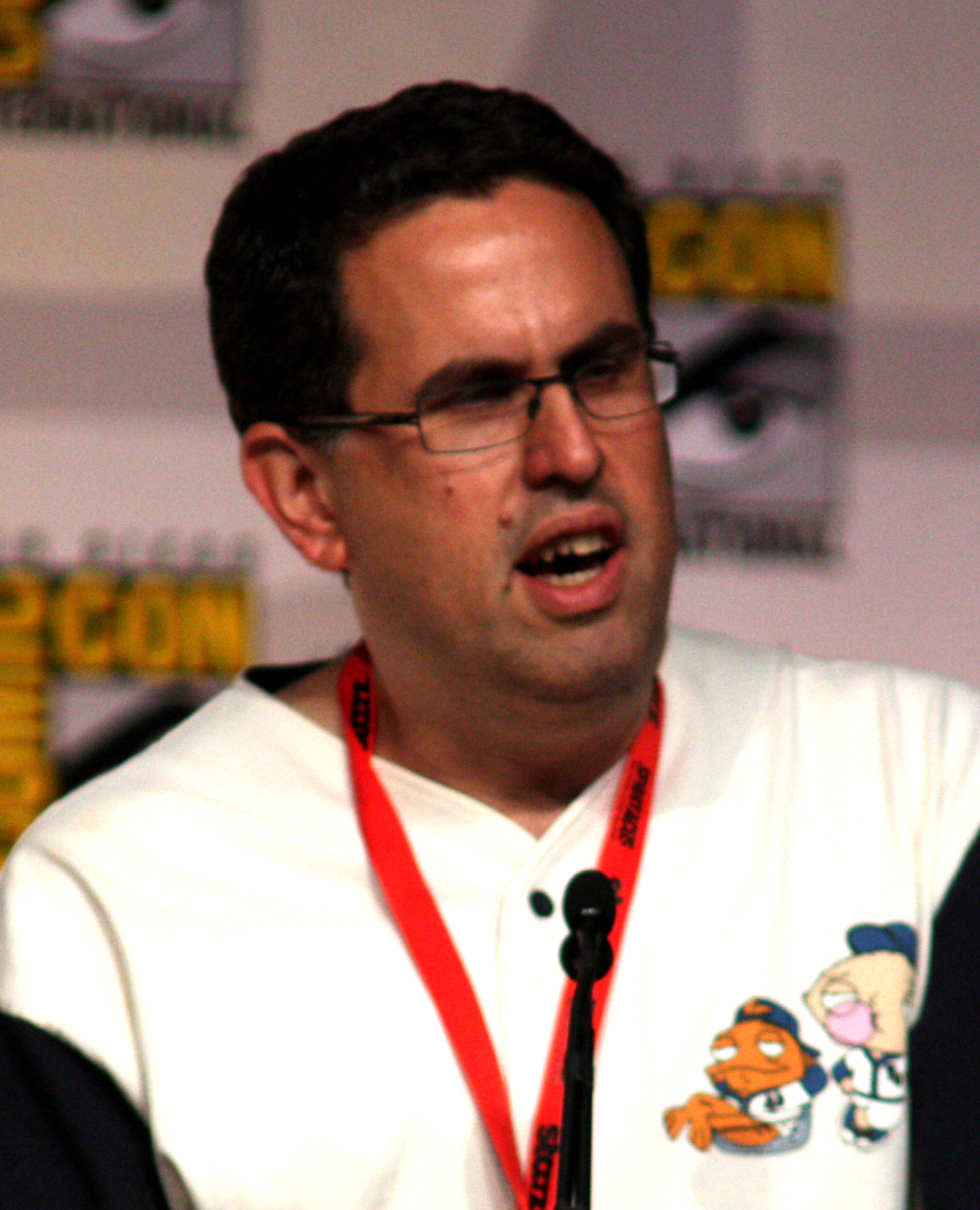
Executive producer David A. Goodman responded to criticism by the PTC.

The Parents Television Council, a frequent critic of Family Guy, branded "Stewie Loves Lois", "Barely Legal", "No Meals on Wheels", and "Bill and Peter's Bogus Journey" as the "worst show of the week." In response to this criticism, executive producer David Goodman claimed that Family Guy is "absolutely for teenagers and adults", and that he does not allow his own children to watch the show.

The season received positive reviews from critics. Ahsan Haque of IGN wrote mixed comments about the season, saying, "The ratio of bad to good episodes was not too favorable in this season of Family Guy. Far too many episodes were either seriously lacking in humor or were just plain poorly written", but added, "While much of the original appeal seems to have washed-off, there are still a few moments from this season that really stand out", listing "Chick Cancer", "Road to Rupert", "Saving Private Brian", and "No Meals on Wheels" as the best episodes of the season. Haque also gave praise to "Blind Ambition", "No Chris Left Behind", "Bill and Peter's Bogus Journey", and "Meet the Quagmires". Manisha Kanetkar of Smart House, however, felt that the series saw "no sign of tiring" and had "as many funny moments as ever." Nancy Basile of About.com regarded "Airport '07", "Prick Up Your Ears", and "Barely Legal" as "gem episodes." In his review for the Family Guy volume five DVD, Francis Rizzo III of DVD Talk said "There are several points to criticize when it comes to this set, including a series that's losing some of its steam and relying on comedic crutches and an oddly constructed episode structure, but in the end, the series is fun to watch, which is all you really ask for from a cartoon sitcom." In a later review, Rizzo added "Is Family Guy coasting on it's [sic] past successes? It could be argued, as the series doesn't surprise or shock the way it once did, instead doing the things that have worked before and doing them more and larger. The DVD releases are predictable and consistent, with high quality and impressive rafts of bonus material, but if the show doesn't do it for you, that doesn't make much of a difference."

== Home media release ==
The first thirteen episodes of the fifth season were released on DVD by 20th Century Fox in the United States and Canada on September 18, 2007, four months after they had completed broadcast on television. The "Volume Five" DVD release features bonus material including deleted scenes, animatics, and commentaries for every episode.

The remaining five episodes of the fifth season, along with the first seven of the sixth season, were also released under the title "Volume 6" by 20th Century Fox in the United States and Canada on October 21, 2008, five months after they had completed broadcast on television. The DVD release also features bonus material including deleted scenes, commentaries, and a 'making of' featurette.

Family Guy Volume Five
Set details			Special features
13 episodes; 3-disc set; 1.33:1 aspect ratio; Languages: English (Dolby Digital 5.1, with subtitles); Spanish (Dolby Digital, with subtitles); French (Dolby Digital)			Optional commentaries for all 13 episodes; Deleted/extended scenes with optional commentary; "Drawing Peter" featurette; "Toys, Toys Galore" featurette; Animatic/storyboards for three episodes; Optional censored audio on eleven episodes
Release dates			Optional commentaries for all 13 episodes; Deleted/extended scenes with optional commentary; "Drawing Peter" featurette; "Toys, Toys Galore" featurette; Animatic/storyboards for three episodes; Optional censored audio on eleven episodes
Region 1	Region 2	Region 4	Optional commentaries for all 13 episodes; Deleted/extended scenes with optional commentary; "Drawing Peter" featurette; "Toys, Toys Galore" featurette; Animatic/storyboards for three episodes; Optional censored audio on eleven episodes
September 18, 2007	October 15, 2007	November 25, 2009	Optional commentaries for all 13 episodes; Deleted/extended scenes with optional commentary; "Drawing Peter" featurette; "Toys, Toys Galore" featurette; Animatic/storyboards for three episodes; Optional censored audio on eleven episodes

Family Guy Volume Six
Set details			Special features
12 episodes; 3-disc set; 1.33:1 aspect ratio; Languages: English (Dolby Digital 5.1, with subtitles); Spanish (Dolby Digital, with subtitles); French (Dolby Digital)			Optional commentaries for all 12 episodes; Deleted/extended Scenes with optional commentary; Family Guy 100th Episode Special; Family Guy Live! – "Just for Laughs"; The 'Making of' the 100th Episode featurette
Release dates			Optional commentaries for all 12 episodes; Deleted/extended Scenes with optional commentary; Family Guy 100th Episode Special; Family Guy Live! – "Just for Laughs"; The 'Making of' the 100th Episode featurette
Region 1	Region 2	Region 4	Optional commentaries for all 12 episodes; Deleted/extended Scenes with optional commentary; Family Guy 100th Episode Special; Family Guy Live! – "Just for Laughs"; The 'Making of' the 100th Episode featurette
October 21, 2008	November 10, 2008	November 25, 2009	Optional commentaries for all 12 episodes; Deleted/extended Scenes with optional commentary; Family Guy 100th Episode Special; Family Guy Live! – "Just for Laughs"; The 'Making of' the 100th Episode featurette
