= Stewie Loves Lois =

- Family Guy episode
- Lois repairs Rupert for Stewie
- Episode no.: Season 5 Episode 1
- Directed by: Mike Kim
- Written by: Mark Hentemann
- Production code: 4ACX32
- Original air date: September 10, 2006

Guest appearances
- Ellen Albertini Dow; Dave Boat; Phil LaMarr as the Judge; Kevin Michael Richardson; Anne-Michelle Seiler

Episode chronology
← Previous "Stu and Stewie's Excellent Adventure"	Next → "Mother Tucker"
- Family Guy season 5

"Stewie Loves Lois" is the first episode of the fifth season of the animated comedy series Family Guy. It originally aired on Fox on September 10, 2006. The episode features Stewie becoming overly affectionate with his mother Lois after an incident. Meanwhile, Peter gets a prostate exam from Dr. Hartman, but believes that he has been raped instead, and decides to prosecute his doctor in court.

The episode was written by Mark Hentemann and directed by Mike Kim. It received mostly mixed reviews from critics for its storyline, and many cultural references. According to Nielsen ratings, it was viewed in 9.93 million homes in its original airing. The episode featured guest performances by Ellen Albertini Dow, Dave Boat, Phil LaMarr, Kevin Michael Richardson and Anne-Michelle Seiler, along with several recurring guest voice actors for the series.

== Plot ==
Quahog becomes the subject of a flu epidemic, and Peter goes to see Dr. Hartman for a vaccine. Although the vaccines are in short supply and must be saved for the elderly, Peter manages to get one anyway (by pretending to fall onto the syringe). While looking through Peter's papers, Hartman realizes that Peter has not had a prostate exam. Peter agrees to get one, despite not knowing what it involves. Upon receiving the procedure, however, Peter feels sexually violated and proceeds to tell Lois about his ordeal, and she is rather unsupportive and finds it amusing, up to the point of cursing and calling him an idiot. (Note: Note that this only occurs in the DVD version; on TV, this is censored as "(bleep)in' idiot".) He then suffers a mental breakdown and tells his friends about the incident, at which point they reveal that Dr. Hartman has also "raped" them. Peter decides to sue Hartman in a court of law, and Lois is unable to talk him out of it.

Meanwhile, Stewie plays at the park with his teddy bear, Rupert. A vicious dog grabs Rupert from him and tears it to shreds. Lois runs after the dog, retrieves Rupert, and repairs him, causing Stewie to rethink all the bad thoughts he has had of Lois. Stewie becomes enamored with her, which she takes as refreshing at first, but eventually, she becomes exhausted and frustrated at his increased dependency and even has a nightmare of murdering him. Taking Brian's advice, she starts ignoring his demands for attention until he injures himself by falling down the stairs; Lois tries to apologize for her behavior, but Stewie is so disgusted by it that it causes him to hate her once again.

In the courtroom, Peter exaggerates the story. The judge is not convinced and even recalls his prostate exam being uneventful. However, after further prompting from Peter, the judge "remembers" being abused and declares Hartman guilty, revoking his license. As Peter celebrates his victory at The Drunken Clam, his frequent need to urinate causes great concern among his friends, where Seamus, the peg-limbed sailor, informs him that his prostate may be infected, and if he doesn't get it checked, it'll likely get worse. This makes Peter finally understand that a prostate exam is an important and legitimate medical procedure. However, his lawsuit makes it unlikely that any doctor would treat him, and indeed, not one does. Realizing the critical situation he has placed himself in, Peter has no choice but to seek Dr. Hartman for help. He visits Dr. Hartman in disguise and unsuccessfully tries to trick him into giving the exam. Peter admits that he was wrong and pleads with Hartman to help him. Despite what Peter did to him, the doctor decides that his Hippocratic Oath requires him to go ahead with the examination anyway. Peter's constant urinating turns out to be due to minor infection and blockage caused by Mr. Sulu somehow being up Peter's rectum. In the epilogue, Dr. Hartman's license is reinstated, and he and Peter reconcile.

== Production ==
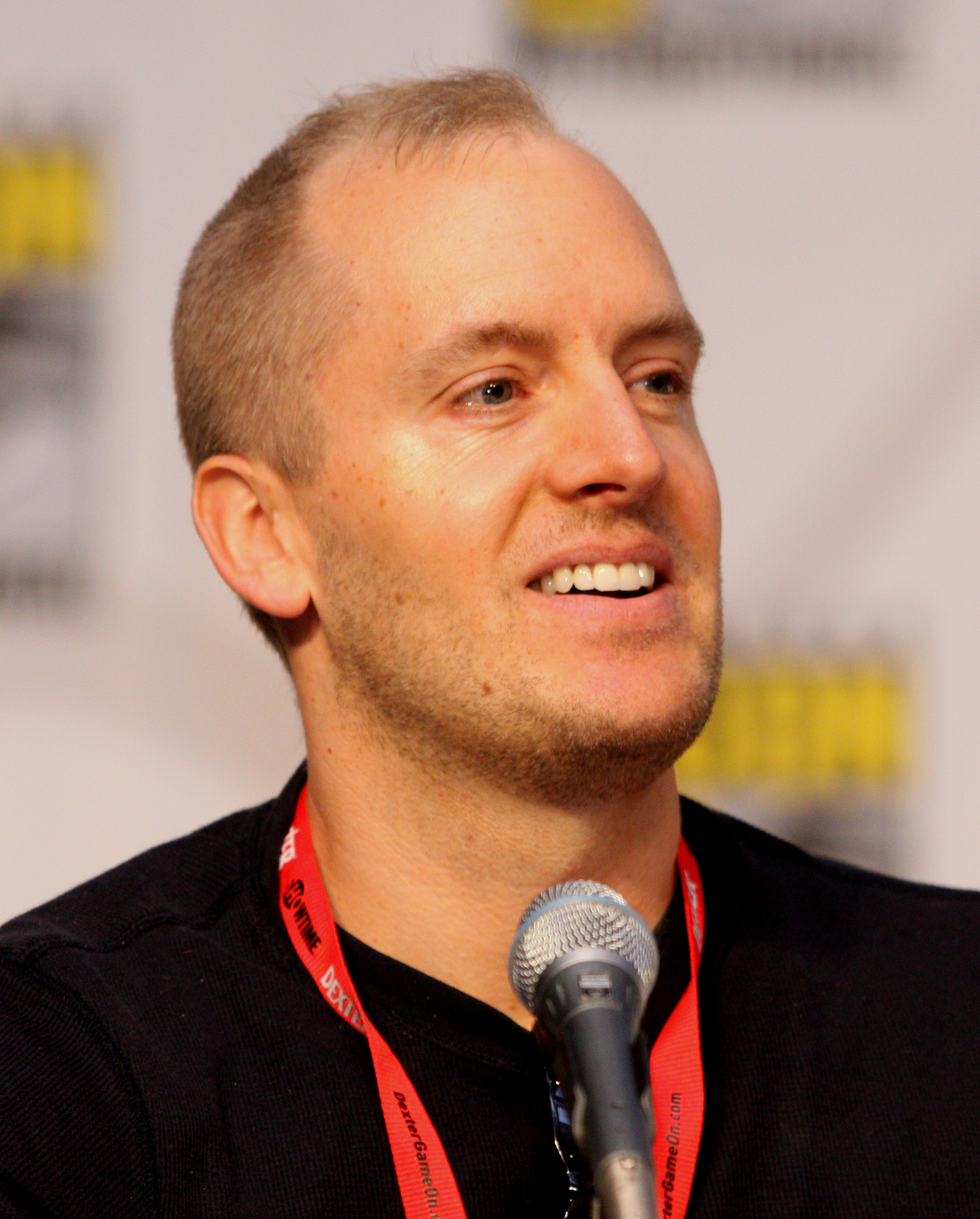
Writer Mark Hentemann wrote the episode.

When Stewie is fantasizing about murdering and harming Lois, he performs several karate and kung-fu moves. This is a reference to an individual whom Mark Hentemann, a writer for Family Guy, used to know. He was the boy who would come to school, car washes or other events and tell stories about the people who he had been in physical fights with. During the scene when Stewie describes Lois as being the female version of Bonnie Hunt, MacFarlane comments that he feels bad about that joke, as just before it was broadcast — Hunt telephoned him on his mobile phone and told him about how much she enjoyed the show, however the gag was not removed due to its expected airing date being so close to when the telephone call was made. On the uncut version of this episode, there is a scene where Peter sleepily mistakes Stewie's mouth for Lois's genitals, muttering, "Oh, you are so ready!" The edited TV version does not have this part, but leaves in the first half, in which Peter sleepily mistakes Stewie's nose for Lois's nipple.

For a reason which was not specified, the sound of Lois's footsteps when going down the basement stairs during her dream of killing Stewie, had to be overcome by Stewie talking more often. This line of Stewie making general conversation in the same scene, was altered several times due to lack of laughter from the audience. MacFarlane comments that the scene of Peter standing up to his teacher who was giving the class a test, is a reference to "80's TV bullshit".

In addition to the regular cast, actress Ellen Albertini Dow, voice actors Dave Boat, Phil LaMarr and Kevin Michael Richardson, and actress Anne-Michelle Seiler guest starred in the episode. Recurring guest voice actors Lori Alan, Alex Breckenridge, writer Mike Henry, writer Danny Smith, writer Alec Sulkin and writer John Viener also made minor appearances. Recurring cast members Adam West and Patrick Warburton guest starred in the episode as well.

== Cultural references ==
During the scene when a car is about to fall off a cliff, Robin the Boy Wonder appears and attempts to save the people. However, upon arrival, he is criticized as he will not be able to save them: this is a reference to the portrayal of Robin from the 1960s Batman series. Throughout the episode, other references are made to fictitious super heroes. In total, three references were made to Star Trek, all of which involve Star Trek actor George Takei's character, Mr. Sulu. When Peter has a flashback about passing his college test he is running around with the song "I'm Free" by Kenny Loggins playing in the background. This is a reference to the movie Footloose. When Peter is recounting what Hartman did to him, he goes into a flashback in court, and everything turns black and white and grainy: this is a reference to The Accused, starring Jodie Foster. During one of the kitchen scenes, Brian teases Stewie singing "Stewie loves Lois!" Stewie retorts by singing, "Brian loves Olympia Dukakis!" To which he replies, "Oh yeah, I do."

When Stewie imagines how a holiday in Hawaii would be with Rupert, he references the classic Calvin and Hobbes series.

Lois makes a reference to Barbara Bush after waking up from her dream of killing Stewie. She claims "I'm just like that Texas woman who gave her son brain damage by holding him underwater, I'm just like Barbara Bush". When the fisherman Seamus is telling Peter about the serious consequences of not getting a prostate exam, he shows Peter a picture of band Primus, to which Peter asks him why he carries such random pictures around with him.

The closing credits are a reference to All in the Family, an American sitcom that originally aired on CBS in the 1970s. At the beginning of the credits, the voice of Peter says "Family Guy was recorded on tape before a live audience" as 'footage' of the city of Quahog is shown.

== Reception ==
IGN's Dan Iverson commented that "the Stewie/Lois story was really kind of funny", noting that the scene was "a nice window in on parenting". He describes the scene of Stewie shouting at Brian in Spanish as being "very funny". However, Iverson criticized the episode, noting that the scene of Peter giving his story in court went from just "creepy and awkward to just plain disturbing". The episode received a final rating by Iverson of 4.5/10. 9.93 million people watched this episode in the US on its first airing ranking #2 on FOX that night behind The Simpsons, making this episode the highest rated of season five.
