= Chick Cancer =

- Family Guy episode
- Episode no.: Season 5 Episode 7
- Directed by: Pete Michels
- Written by: Alec Sulkin and Wellesley Wild
- Production code: 5ACX02
- Original air date: November 26, 2006

Guest appearances
- Drew Barrymore as Jillian; Jeff Bergman as Victor; Dave Boat; Lizzy Caplan; Rachael MacFarlane as Olivia Fuller; Stacey Scowley

Episode chronology
← Previous "Prick Up Your Ears"	Next → "Barely Legal"
- Family Guy season 5

"Chick Cancer" is the seventh episode of season five of the American comedy series Family Guy. The episode originally broadcast on Fox on November 26, 2006. In the episode, Stewie's old friend and child actress, Olivia Fuller (voiced by Rachael MacFarlane) returns to Quahog. Stewie intends to sabotage what little is left of her career, but ends up falling in love with her, only for the relationship to end in ruins due to his personality. Meanwhile, Peter decides to make a chick flick after enjoying one he saw in the cinema with Lois.

The episode was written by Alec Sulkin and Wellesley Wild and directed by Pete Michels. It received mostly positive reviews from critics for its storyline and many cultural references. According to Nielsen ratings, it was viewed in 9.49 million homes in its original airing. The episode featured guest performances by Drew Barrymore, Jeff Bergman, Dave Boat, Lizzy Caplan, Rachael MacFarlane and Stacey Scowley, along with several recurring guest voice actors for the series.

== Plot ==
Stewie discovers that his old friend, Olivia, a toddler actress, is coming to the end of her Hollywood career because her "Tasty Juice" advertisement campaign has been dropped. Olivia is now making an appearance at the Quahog mall to open a new store. Stewie decides to go to the mall where he intends to ridicule her, but falls in love with her after seeing her again. Olivia, however, does not return the same feelings, so Stewie seeks advice from Brian on how to make Olivia like him. Brian and Stewie observe next-door neighbor Glenn Quagmire get his way by being mean to a woman, and Stewie comes to the conclusion that women respond to men who mistreat them.

Stewie and Olivia begin to bond shortly afterward, and the two spend their time bonding by sitting in a park while eating ice cream. As they sit and eat their ice cream, they mock various people, such as a man smelling his own hand, a Jewish cowboy, a man who cuts his own hair, and an uptight and hardworking Asian man who is looking at his watch. They also go to a birthday party for one of Olivia's friends. Olivia introduces Stewie to her old friend, a child actor named Victor, and she obliges Stewie to get both of them punch, but a jealous Stewie only wishes Victor to go away. The couple begin to argue constantly, and their latest argument ends with them getting married. After the marriage, which Rupert officiates, their relationship does not get any better. Later, the couple accompanies Brian on a double-date with his girlfriend, Jillian. During the date, the pair continue to bicker throughout, leading to Stewie starting an argument with a person in the restaurant who asks him to be quiet. He feels the relationship is failing, but Brian encourages him to reconsider and Stewie agrees to return to Olivia. Returning to his playhouse to apologize and make up with her, Stewie discovers Olivia "cheating" on him with her friend Victor by playing with silly putty. With the relationship over, a seemingly distraught Stewie leaves the playhouse, which he then sets on fire with both Olivia and Victor inside. He then tells Brian he does not like women and relationships and that he wishes that he could do the same thing with the same sex. Brian says it is called "being gay", which intrigues Stewie.

Meanwhile, Peter watches a chick flick with Lois, and is deeply moved by it. After renting several other chick flicks, Peter decides to make one of his own with his friends, entitled Steel Vaginas. The plot stars Peter as a man who claims he does not care much for women until he meets "Vageena Hertz", played by Lois, who is also his own daughter in the film. After Vageena almost drowns when she goes swimming too soon after eating, she is rushed to the hospital, but dies of an angry hymen. The film ends and is received badly by Peter's friends due to its poor plot outline, structure and not making any sense.

== Production ==
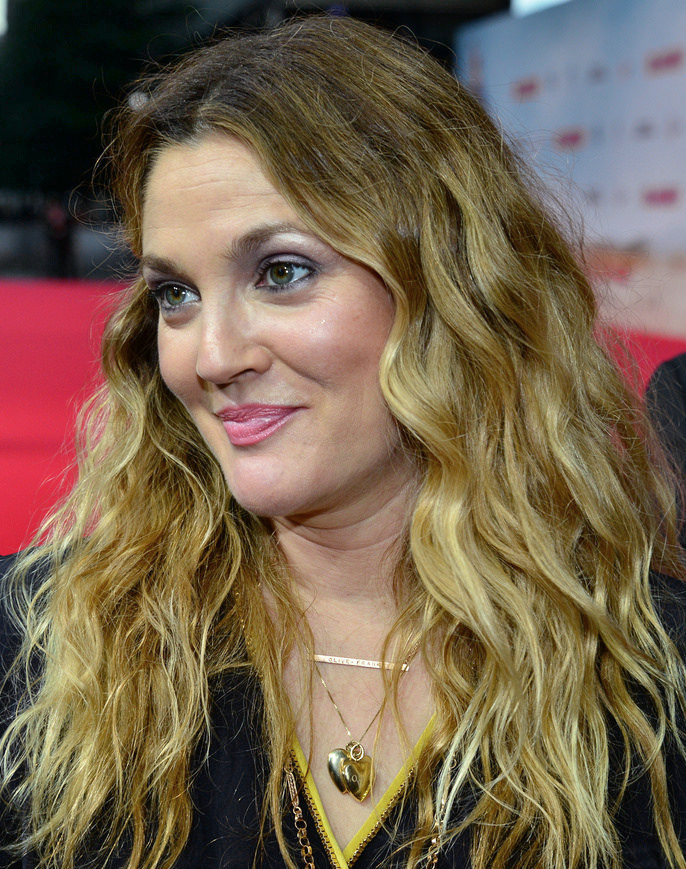
Drew Barrymore reprised her role as Jillian.

Many of the jokes used in the storyline of this episode were originally pitched for a subplot of this episode, which saw Stewie building a robot suit to make him look like an adult to woo Jillian's best friend Ana, but this particular subplot was never used. The scene showing a mayor advertising a 1980s-related CD was included in the original draft for the episode, and, as MacFarlane states, is one of the rare occasions that an act break that is unrelated entirely to the storyline can be included in an episode. Originally, the gag of Stewie using some of Brian's fur to pass it off as his pubic hair was going to be the only area of his body where he would tell Jillian about his hair, but MacFarlane states that the show was not allowed to mention only pubic hair, and had to steer to a different area on the body that would have hair too, if they wanted to include it. Broadcasting standards allowed the sketch where Peter says "before, women only made me cry through my penis," as he states they "gave in." Additionally, while on the version broadcast Lois dies of an angry hymen, on the DVD version she dies of a rotten vagina.

In addition to the regular cast, actress Drew Barrymore, voice actor Jeff Bergman, voice actor Dave Boat, actress Lizzy Caplan, voice actress Rachael MacFarlane and actress Stacey Scowley guest starred in the episode. Recurring guest voice actors Lori Alan, actress Alex Breckenridge, voice actor John G. Brennan, writer Danny Smith, writer Alec Sulkin and writer John Viener made minor appearances.

== Cultural references ==
- This episode references three Woody Allen films.
  - Stewie and Olivia watching people in the park is a reference to a scene from Annie Hall.
  - Stewie and Olivia sitting under a bridge while on a date is a reference to Manhattan, and the music playing in the background is "Someone to Watch over Me", a song composed by George Gershwin and featured prominently in the film.
  - Victor, the person with whom Olivia is revealed to be having an affair, is based on a character portrayed by Alan Alda in the 1989 film Crimes and Misdemeanors.
- While referencing Star Wars, the theme from Curb Your Enthusiasm is played.
- Brian repeatedly telling Stewie that it is not his fault after his break-up with Olivia is a reference to Good Will Hunting.
- Stewie reflects on how it was easier being Q*bert's roommate and an animation of him on the game board is shown.
- The song "Ain't No Mountain High Enough", by Marvin Gaye and Tammi Terrell, is played during a scene in the chick flick Peter and Lois go to watch at the beginning of the episode.
- After asking out Olivia, Stewie claims that he's as cool as that cheetah from the commercials. Then a cutaway shows Chester Cheetah sitting in a rundown apartment inhaling crushed Cheetos like cocaine. At the same time he is listening to "Tom Sawyer" by Canadian rock band Rush. He then smashes his hands into a coffee table and says "It ain't easy being Cheesy." In the uncensored version (released on DVD) this follows the line "There is no [expletive] drummer better than Neil Peart!"

== Reception ==
In a slight improvement over the previous week, the episode was viewed in 9.49 million homes in its original airing, according to Nielsen ratings. The episode also acquired a 3.3 rating in the 18–49 demographic, slightly being edged out by The Simpsons, while still winning over American Dad!.

Dan Iverson of IGN wrote "this week was confirmation of the show's quality, as 'Chick Cancer' proved that the program could create hilarious flashbacks, while presenting a story that added a lick of satire to improve on the overall quality of the show." In a review of the episode, Brett Love of TV Squad wrote "I'm still calling this an up and down season overall, but this episode was one of the upswings," adding that "There were some truly great moments." Later in the review, Love comments "If there was anything I didn't like about the story it was that bad boy Stewie was so short lived."
