= Prick Up Your Ears (Family Guy) =

- Family Guy episode
- Episode no.: Season 5 Episode 6
- Directed by: James Purdum
- Written by: Cherry Chevapravatdumrong
- Production code: 5ACX01
- Original air date: November 19, 2006

Guest appearances
- Drew Barrymore as Jillian; Mindy Cohn; Gary Cole as Principal Shepherd; Taylor Cole; Lauren Conrad; David Cross as Jerry Kirkwood; Margaret Easley; Lauren Hooser; Kim Parks; Kevin Michael Richardson as Rodney King; André Sogliuzzo; Crawford Wilson

Episode chronology
← Previous "Whistle While Your Wife Works"	Next → "Chick Cancer"
- Family Guy season 5

"Prick Up Your Ears" is the sixth episode of the fifth season of Family Guy. It originally aired on Fox in the United States on November 19, 2006. In this episode, Lois discovers that Chris' school has removed the sex education program due to budget cuts and decides to bring the class back by becoming the teacher. She gets fired a short time later for teaching the students about safe sex rather than abstinence. Meanwhile, Stewie attempts to find and kill the Tooth Fairy after being told "horror" stories by Brian.

The episode was written by Cherry Chevapravatdumrong and directed by James Purdum. It received mixed reviews from critics for its storyline and many cultural references. According to Nielsen ratings, it was viewed in 9.3 million homes in its original airing. The episode featured guest performances by Drew Barrymore, Mindy Cohn, Gary Cole, Taylor Cole, Lauren Conrad, David Cross, Margaret Easley, Lauren Hooser, Kim Parks, Kevin Michael Richardson, André Sogliuzzo and Crawford Wilson, along with several recurring guest voice actors for the series.

== Plot ==
After Mayor West breaks the window of an adult video store with a "cat launcher" while chasing a pizza delivery guy due to West receiving the wrong pizza toppings, Chris and his friends steal some videos from the store and watch one of the pornographic films with Stewie, who is very confused at the plot of the film making little sense. Lois catches them watching the film "Genital Hospital" and becomes convinced a proper sex-ed class should be taught at his school.

Since the sex-ed class at her children's school was removed, Lois decides to become the school's newest sex-ed teacher. In class, she attempts to teach students about safe sex, but her efforts are ruined by a botched attempt of Peter, who wishes to distribute his views on sex as well. Soon after the first sex-ed class, parental protests arise as Lois taught kids about safe ways to perform premarital sex, instead of abstinence. As a result, Lois is subsequently fired and banned from School grounds. She is replaced by reverend Jerry Kirkwood, who promotes both premarital and marital abstinence, explaining fictional consequences of intercourse with various questionable examples. The idea appeals to most students, including Meg, who starts a relationship with a fellow student named Doug.

Peter, truly believing the anti-sex propaganda Meg brings home, starts wearing a chastity belt and refuses to have sex with Lois. At the same time, Lois catches Meg and Doug engaging in "ear sex", which has become a fad at the school. Meg explains they did it so that it would not count as sex "in the eyes of the Lord". When Peter tries the same thing on Lois, she is outraged and rapes him. This actually gets Peter to change his mind and prompts him and Lois to collaborate into sneaking into the school after being banned.

During one of Kirkwood's assemblies, Lois pushes him off of the stage and tells the kids not to listen to him as he is wrong and feeding them lies. She then tells the kids that while they should not have sex until they are ready, everyone has urges and it is okay to have premarital sex, but only as long as it is practiced safely and encourages them to use condoms. Following this revelation, Doug breaks up with Meg after discovering her naked appearance. A humiliated Meg blames Lois for destroying her relationship.

In a subplot, Stewie loses a tooth and is told about the tooth fairy. Frightened by the fairy tale, Stewie develops a plan to capture the fairy, not knowing she does not exist. He borrows Herbert's false teeth and provokes Brian's girlfriend Jillian to throw up, as she has bulimia nervosa, in order to collect her teeth as well. Brian, overseeing Stewie's increasing obsession with the fairy, reveals to Stewie that she does not exist, but another scene shows a man named T. Fairy, having an apparent tooth fetish, stealing teeth to roll around in them.

== Production and censorship ==
Many scenes from the original episode were seen as vulgar and were removed from the television broadcast. One of the scenes removed was from the beginning of the episode when Stewie, Chris, and his friends were watching Genital Hospital, a reference to the television show General Hospital. The original animatic had included the doctor on the film undoing his zipper after discussing the patient's health problems. The edited version seen in the final version of the episode cut away before the doctor could undo his zipper, but the sound can still be heard when it cuts back to Chris and his friends watching the porno.

Another scene edited was a naked Peter shown crouched on top of Lois's head (attempting ear sex) (even though it was shown on Adult Swim every time the episode repeats). On the TV version, Peter is still naked, but it is implied (through sound effects) that Lois forcibly pushed him to the floor and she has a hand on her ear (implying Peter attempted ear sex). In this scene, Peter refers to the Grimace as Ronald McDonald's autistic friend, which was originally penned as "retarded friend" (and is included in the uncut version). A scene in which Brian, wearing a robe, informs Lois of the weird-tasting Smuckers jelly in the fridge leads Peter to reveal that the Smuckers was on his penis was edited on TV so that way he states that the jelly was on his crotch.

In a scene added later to the episode, Mel Gibson apologizes to the Jewish community after being offensive while continuing to offend them. The scene was added after the episode had been made but prior to broadcasting. When Peter joins Meg in her quest to be abstinent, the TV version has a gag where Peter keeps mispronouncing the word, Meg corrects him, and Peter punishes her by sending her to her room. The Adult Swim and DVD version replaces that scene with one that was edited for being insensitive to Asian people in which Peter tells Meg that now that he is abstinent, he will be as untouched as the turn signal on an Asian woman's car, followed by a cutaway of an Asian lady causing an accident on an eight-lane highway.

In the scene involving Stewie entering Herbert's house, a picture of Chris with the body of a model was in the animatic, but not shown on TV. The original ending of this episode (with the "choose your own ending" text message contest) was supposed to have Lois and Peter throw Brian out the window instead of giving Cleveland his one and only appearance in the episode. This deleted scene is featured in the episode animatic on the season five DVD set.

In addition to the regular cast, actors Drew Barrymore, Mindy Cohn, Gary Cole, Taylor Cole, Lauren Conrad, David Cross, Margaret Easley, Lauren Hooser, Kim Parks, Kevin Michael Richardson, André Sogliuzzo and Crawford Wilson guest star in the episode. Recurring guest voices include Lori Alan, Alex Breckenridge, Steve Callaghan, Chris Cox, Ralph Garman, Danny Smith, Alec Sulkin, John Viener, and Adam West, who has a role of an exaggerated version of himself.

== Cultural references ==
As Lois is informed the sex education classes will be terminated, she exclaims "Oh, no!", a cut-a-way scene then begins of a sports car driving along the road with music playing in the background, this is a reference to Knight Rider. When Stewie is using his toys in order to capture and kill the tooth fairy, the toys are SpongeBob from SpongeBob SquarePants, Starscream (from The Transformers) and Man-E-Faces, all of which are fictional characters from television programs.

When Peter is watching television, he is watching Laguna Beach: The Real Orange County; the women shown on the episode are actually cartoon animations of the real actors for the show. When Lois catches Chris and his friends watching a pornographic film, she tells them that without sex education, they can easily become sexually confused. The scene cuts to Michael Jackson in his childhood form eating a bowl of Frosted Mini-Wheats, saying that he likes the frosted side, while the grown-up in him likes his younger self.

When Lois teaches a sex education class, Peter uses a bust of William Shakespeare and a Rainbow Brite doll to demonstrate sexual intercourse. In the scene where Stewie loses a tooth, everybody comes in and tells him to calm down, then it shows a long line of characters, mimicking a scene from the movie Airplane!. While doing a news story on ear sex, Diane tells Tom that CSI is on Thursdays. When Brian talks about Jillian's bulimia, he mentions the death of singer Karen Carpenter, who died from anorexia in 1983. When Stewie thinks that Brian is the Tooth Fairy, Brian substantiates his identity by telling Stewie he has a picture of Chris Noth in his wallet, known for his role on Law & Order.

== Reception ==
In a slight improvement over the previous week, the episode was viewed in 9.3 million homes in its original airing, according to Nielsen ratings. The episode also acquired a 3.3 rating in the 18–49 demographic, tying with The Simpsons, while still winning over American Dad!.

Although the episode received little positive reception, it was given a positive review by IGN's Dan Iverson, who noted that its plot had "great satire of the issue of sex education vs. abstinence". He also stated that "the random flashback jokes are often what are most memorable about each episode". He gave the episode a rating of 7.8 out of 10. In his review of Family Guy, volume 5, Francis Rizzo III of DVD Talk called the episode "a smart jab at the conservative Christian approach to sex education", and stated that "the effect it has on Meg, as well as Peter, is great".
