= List of Family Guy episodes =

Episode list for an animated series

Family Guy is an American adult animated television sitcom created by Seth MacFarlane for the Fox Broadcasting Company. The series centers on the dysfunctional Griffin family, which consists of father Peter (MacFarlane), mother Lois (Alex Borstein), daughter Meg (Lacey Chabert in Episodes 1–9, 12-14, 16, & 17 then Mila Kunis in Episodes 10 & 11, 15, 18 onward), son Chris (Seth Green), baby Stewie (MacFarlane), and Brian (MacFarlane), the family dog. The show is set in the fictional town of Quahog, Rhode Island, and lampoons American culture in the form of cutaway gags, science fiction, and tangential vignettes.

The concept of Family Guy was conceived by MacFarlane in 1995 while studying animation at the Rhode Island School of Design. He created two shorts entitled The Life of Larry and Larry & Steve, both of which played a key role in Fox executives' decision to pick up the series in 1998. After two seasons, Fox decided to cancel the show. Despite the cancellation, a third season was produced, after which the series was officially cancelled at the end of the 2001–2002 season. Reruns on Cartoon Network's block Adult Swim drove up interest, and a letter-writing campaign, along with impressive DVD sales, encouraged Fox to bring the show back for the 2005–2006 television season.

Family Guy and its cast have been nominated for twenty-seven Primetime Emmy Awards, winning eight. MacFarlane won the Outstanding Voice-Over Performance award for his performance as Stewie, MacFarlane and Walter Murphy won the Outstanding Music and Lyrics award for the song "You Got a Lot to See" from the episode "Brian Wallows and Peter's Swallows", Steven Fonti won the Outstanding Individual Achievement in Animation award for his storyboard work in the episode "No Chris Left Behind", Greg Colton won the Outstanding Individual Achievement in Animation award for his storyboard work in the episode "Road to the Multiverse", Patrick S. Clark and Jim Fitzpatrick won the Outstanding Sound Mixing for a Comedy or Drama Series (Half-Hour) and Animation award for their sound mixing work on the episode "Road to the North Pole", and MacFarlane won the Outstanding Character Voice-Over Performance award for his performances in the episode "Pilling Them Softly". The show was nominated for twelve Annies, and won three times, twice in 2006 and once in 2008. In 2009, it was nominated for an Emmy for Outstanding Comedy Series, becoming the first animated program to be nominated in this category since The Flintstones in 1961.

As of October 5, 2026, 462 episodes of Family Guy have aired, concluding the twenty-fourth season. The series remains Fox's second-longest-running program, behind The Simpsons. It also remains the fourth-longest-running scripted primetime series in North America. Season 23 officially premiered on February 16, 2025, after two Hulu-exclusive holiday specials released in October and November 2024, and concluded on July 17, 2025.

On April 2, 2025, it was announced that Family Guy would be renewed for four more seasons in what is considered a "mega deal" with parent company Disney. This renewal will take the show through the 2028–29 television season.

== Series overview ==
| Season | Episodes | Originally released | | | Rank | Average viewers (in millions) |
| Season | Episodes | First released | Last released | Network | Rank | Average viewers (in millions) |
|---|---|---|---|---|---|---|
| Pilot | | 1998 | | N/A | TBA | TBA |
| 1 | 7 | January 31, 1999 | May 16, 1999 | Fox | 33 | 14.12 |
| 2 | 21 | September 23, 1999 | August 1, 2000 | Fox | 114 | 6.74 |
| 3 | 22 (Note: Season 3 officially ended on February 14, 2002 with 21 episodes. Episode 22 was first released on DVD before making its first broadcast on Adult Swim; the episode would later premiere on Fox on December 10, 2004.) | July 11, 2001 | November 9, 2003 | Fox | 125 | 4.50 |
| 4 | 30 | May 1, 2005 | May 21, 2006 | Fox | 68 | 7.90 |
| 5 | 18 | September 10, 2006 | May 20, 2007 | Fox | 71 | 8.69 |
| 6 | 12 | September 23, 2007 | May 4, 2008 | Fox | 84 | 7.94 |
| 7 | 16 | September 28, 2008 | May 17, 2009 | Fox | 69 | 7.56 |
| 8 | 21 (Note: Season 8 officially ended on May 23, 2010 with 20 episodes. Episode 21 was first broadcast on BBC Three in the UK on June 20, 2010, before debuting in the US on DVD on September 28, 2010.) | September 27, 2009 | June 20, 2010 | Fox | 53 | 7.73 |
| 9 | 18 | September 26, 2010 | May 22, 2011 | Fox | 56 | 7.66 |
| 10 | 23 | September 25, 2011 | May 20, 2012 | Fox | 63 | 7.30 |
| 11 | 22 | September 30, 2012 | May 19, 2013 | Fox | 62 | 6.94 |
| 12 | 21 | September 29, 2013 | May 18, 2014 | Fox | 78 | 6.11 |
| 13 | 18 | September 28, 2014 | May 17, 2015 | Fox | 94 | 5.86 |
| 14 | 20 | September 27, 2015 | May 22, 2016 | Fox | 111 | 4.28 |
| 15 | 20 | September 25, 2016 | May 21, 2017 | Fox | 116 | 3.93 |
| 16 | 20 | October 1, 2017 | May 20, 2018 | Fox | 136 | 3.52 |
| 17 | 20 | September 30, 2018 | May 12, 2019 | Fox | 131 | 3.33 |
| 18 | 20 | September 29, 2019 | May 17, 2020 | Fox | 107 | 2.65 |
| 19 | 20 | September 27, 2020 | May 16, 2021 | Fox | 120 | 2.19 |
| 20 | 20 | September 26, 2021 | May 22, 2022 | Fox | 111 | 1.9 |
| 21 | 20 | September 25, 2022 | May 7, 2023 | Fox | 104 | 1.64 |
| 22 | 15 | October 1, 2023 | April 17, 2024 | Fox | 115 | 1.44 |
| 23 | 20^{[n1]} | October 14, 2024 | July 17, 2025 | Fox; Hulu | N/A | N/A |
| 24 | 17^{[n2]} | October 6, 2025 | May 17, 2026 | Fox; Hulu | N/A | N/A |
| 25 | 17^{[n2]} | October 5, 2026 | TBA | Fox; Hulu | TBA | TBA |

Notes

1. Season 23 had eighteen episodes broadcast on Fox, and two are Hulu exclusives that are not a part of the normal season.
2. Season 24 had fifteen episodes broadcast on Fox, with an additional two Hulu exclusives that are not a part of the normal season.

== Episodes ==
=== Pilot (1998) ===
| Title | Directed by | Written by | Produced date |
|---|---|---|---|
| "Pilot" | Seth MacFarlane | Seth MacFarlane | 1998 |
A rough cut of what would eventually become the series' first episode "Death Has a Shadow". Its first 7 minutes were available on the Volume 2 DVD in 2003. The full episode was leaked online and uploaded to the YouTube website on March 20, 2025, after years of being assumed lost.

=== Season 1 (1999) ===
| No. overall | No. in season | Title | Directed by | Written by | Original release date | Prod. code | U.S. viewers (millions) |
|---|---|---|---|---|---|---|---|
| 1 | 1 | "Death Has a Shadow" | Peter Shin | Seth MacFarlane | January 31, 1999 | 1ACX01 | 22.00 |
| 2 | 2 | "I Never Met the Dead Man" | Michael Dante DiMartino | Chris Sheridan | April 11, 1999 | 1ACX02 | 14.50 |
| 3 | 3 | "Chitty Chitty Death Bang" | Dominic Polcino | Danny Smith | April 18, 1999 | 1ACX04 | 13.78 |
| 4 | 4 | "Mind Over Murder" | Roy Allen Smith | Neil Goldman & Garrett Donovan | April 25, 1999 | 1ACX03 | 11.69 |
| 5 | 5 | "A Hero Sits Next Door" | Monte Young | Mike Barker & Matt Weitzman | May 2, 1999 | 1ACX05 | 12.61 |
| 6 | 6 | "The Son Also Draws" | Neil Affleck | Ricky Blitt | May 9, 1999 | 1ACX06 | 11.20 |
| 7 | 7 | "Brian: Portrait of a Dog" | Michael Dante DiMartino | Gary Janetti | May 16, 1999 | 1ACX07 | 13.10 |

=== Season 2 (1999–2000) ===
| No. overall | No. in season | Title | Directed by | Written by | Original release date | Prod. code | U.S. viewers (millions) |
|---|---|---|---|---|---|---|---|
| 8 | 1 | "Peter, Peter, Caviar Eater" | Jeff Myers | Chris Sheridan | September 23, 1999 | 1ACX08 | 7.72 |
| 9 | 2 | "Holy Crap" | Neil Affleck | Danny Smith | September 30, 1999 | 1ACX11 | 5.40 |
| 10 | 3 | "Da Boom" | Bob Jaques | Neil Goldman & Garrett Donovan | December 26, 1999 | 2ACX06 | 9.37 |
| 11 | 4 | "Brian in Love" | Jack Dyer | Gary Janetti | March 7, 2000 | 2ACX01 | 7.33 |
| 12 | 5 | "Love Thy Trophy" | Jack Dyer | Mike Barker & Matt Weitzman | March 14, 2000 | 1ACX13 | 6.68 |
| 13 | 6 | "Death Is a Bitch" | Michael Dante DiMartino | Ricky Blitt | March 21, 2000 | 1ACX14 | 6.97 |
| 14 | 7 | "The King Is Dead" | Monte Young | Craig Hoffman | March 28, 2000 | 1ACX15 | 6.91 |
| 15 | 8 | "I Am Peter, Hear Me Roar" | Monte Young | Chris Sheridan | March 28, 2000 | 2ACX02 | 7.62 |
| 16 | 9 | "If I'm Dyin', I'm Lyin'" | Swinton O. Scott III | Chris Sheridan | April 4, 2000 | 1ACX12 | 6.24 |
| 17 | 10 | "Running Mates" | John Holmquist | Neil Goldman & Garrett Donovan | April 11, 2000 | 1ACX09 | 6.30 |
| 18 | 11 | "A Picture Is Worth 1,000 Bucks" | Gavin Dell | Craig Hoffman | April 18, 2000 | 2ACX07 | 6.07 |
| 19 | 12 | "Fifteen Minutes of Shame" | Scott Wood | Steve Callaghan | April 25, 2000 | 2ACX08 | 6.62 |
| 20 | 13 | "Road to Rhode Island" | Dan Povenmire | Gary Janetti | May 30, 2000 | 2ACX12 | 6.47 |
| 21 | 14 | "Let's Go to the Hop" | Glen Hill | Mike Barker & Matt Weitzman | June 6, 2000 | 2ACX04 | 5.70 |
| 22 | 15 | "Dammit Janet" | Bert Ring | Mike Barker & Matt Weitzman | June 13, 2000 | 2ACX09 | 7.34 |
| 23 | 16 | "There's Something About Paulie" | Monte Young | Ricky Blitt | June 27, 2000 | 1ACX10 | 6.88 |
| 24 | 17 | "He's Too Sexy for His Fat" | Glen Hill | Chris Sheridan | June 27, 2000 | 2ACX10 | 6.56 |
| 25 | 18 | "E. Peterbus Unum" | Rob Renzetti | Neil Goldman & Garrett Donovan | July 12, 2000 | 2ACX13 | 5.50 |
| 26 | 19 | "The Story on Page One" | Gavin Dell | Craig Hoffman | July 18, 2000 | 2ACX14 | 5.66 |
| 27 | 20 | "Wasted Talent" | Bert Ring | Story by : Dave Collard & Ken Goin; Teleplay by : Mike Barker & Matt Weitzman | July 25, 2000 | 2ACX15 | 6.82 |
| 28 | 21 | "Fore, Father" | Scott Wood | Bobby Bowman | August 1, 2000 | 2ACX16 | 6.15 |

=== Season 3 (2001–03) ===
| No. overall | No. in season | Title | Directed by | Written by | Original release date | Prod. code | U.S. viewers (millions) |
|---|---|---|---|---|---|---|---|
| 29 | 1 | "The Thin White Line" | Glen Hill | Steve Callaghan | July 11, 2001 | 2ACX17 | 5.99 |
| 30 | 2 | "Brian Does Hollywood" | Gavin Dell | Gary Janetti | July 18, 2001 | 2ACX20 | 6.10 |
| 31 | 3 | "Mr. Griffin Goes to Washington" | Brian Hogan | Ricky Blitt | July 25, 2001 | 2ACX11 | 6.17 |
| 32 | 4 | "One If by Clam, Two If by Sea" | Dan Povenmire | Jim Bernstein & Michael Shipley | August 1, 2001 | 2ACX19 | 5.82 |
| 33 | 5 | "And the Wiener Is..." | Bert Ring | Mike Barker & Matt Weitzman | August 8, 2001 | 2ACX22 | 5.40 |
| 34 | 6 | "Death Lives" | Rob Renzetti | Mike Henry | August 15, 2001 | 2ACX21 | 5.19 |
| 35 | 7 | "Lethal Weapons" | Brian Hogan | Chris Sheridan | August 22, 2001 | 2ACX18 | 5.92 |
| 36 | 8 | "The Kiss Seen Around the World" | Pete Michels | Mark Hentemann | August 29, 2001 | 3ACX02 | 6.46 |
| 37 | 9 | "Mr. Saturday Knight" | Michael Dante DiMartino | Steve Callaghan | September 5, 2001 | 3ACX04 | 5.77 |
| 38 | 10 | "A Fish Out of Water" | Bert Ring | Alex Borstein & Mike Henry | September 19, 2001 | 3ACX05 | 5.37 |
| 39 | 11 | "Emission Impossible" | Peter Shin | Dave Collard & Ken Goin | November 8, 2001 | 3ACX01 | 5.28 |
| 40 | 12 | "To Love and Die in Dixie" | Dan Povenmire | Steve Callaghan | November 15, 2001 | 3ACX09 | 5.0 |
| 41 | 13 | "Screwed the Pooch" | Pete Michels | Dave Collard & Ken Goin | November 29, 2001 | 3ACX08 | 4.67 |
| 42 | 14 | "Peter Griffin: Husband, Father... Brother?" | Scott Wood | Mike Barker & Matt Weitzman | December 6, 2001 | 3ACX06 | 4.25 |
| 43 | 15 | "Ready, Willing, and Disabled" | Andi Klein | Alex Barnow & Marc Firek | December 20, 2001 | 3ACX07 | 4.69 |
| 44 | 16 | "A Very Special Family Guy Freakin' Christmas" | Brian Hogan | Danny Smith | December 21, 2001 | 2ACX03 | 4.53 |
| 45 | 17 | "Brian Wallows and Peter's Swallows" | Dan Povenmire | Ali Adler | January 17, 2002 | 3ACX03 | 5.36 |
| 46 | 18 | "From Method to Madness" | Bert Ring | Mike Barker & Matt Weitzman | January 24, 2002 | 3ACX11 | 5.32 |
| 47 | 19 | "Stuck Together, Torn Apart" | Michael Dante DiMartino | Mark Hentemann | January 31, 2002 | 3ACX10 | 4.60 |
| 48 | 20 | "Road to Europe" | Dan Povenmire | Daniel Palladino | February 7, 2002 | 3ACX13 | 4.35 |
| 49 | 21 | "Family Guy Viewer Mail #1" | Pete Michels | Gene Laufenberg | February 14, 2002 | 3ACX12 | 4.63 |
| 49 | 21 | "Family Guy Viewer Mail #1" | Scott Wood | Seth MacFarlane | February 14, 2002 | 3ACX12 | 4.63 |
| 49 | 21 | "Family Guy Viewer Mail #1" | Michael Dante DiMartino | Jim Bernstein & Michael Shipley | February 14, 2002 | 3ACX12 | 4.63 |
| 50 | 22 | "When You Wish Upon a Weinstein" | Dan Povenmire | Ricky Blitt | September 9, 2003 (DVD); November 9, 2003 (Adult Swim); December 10, 2004 (Fox) | 2ACX05 | 4.88 (Fox) |

=== Season 4 (2005–06) ===
| No. overall | No. in season | Title | Directed by | Written by | Original release date | Prod. code | U.S. viewers (millions) |
|---|---|---|---|---|---|---|---|
| 51 | 1 | "North by North Quahog" | Peter Shin | Seth MacFarlane | May 1, 2005 | 4ACX01 | 11.87 |
| 52 | 2 | "Fast Times at Buddy Cianci Jr. High" | Pete Michels | Ken Goin | May 8, 2005 | 4ACX02 | 9.90 |
| 53 | 3 | "Blind Ambition" | Chuck Klein | Steve Callaghan | May 15, 2005 | 4ACX04 | 9.26 |
| 54 | 4 | "Don't Make Me Over" | Sarah Frost | Gene Laufenberg | June 5, 2005 | 4ACX03 | 7.35 |
| 55 | 5 | "The Cleveland–Loretta Quagmire" | James Purdum | Mike Henry & Patrick Henry | June 12, 2005 | 4ACX08 | 8.21 |
| 56 | 6 | "Petarded" | Seth Kearsley | Alec Sulkin & Wellesley Wild | June 19, 2005 | 4ACX09 | 7.17 |
| 57 | 7 | "Brian the Bachelor" | Dan Povenmire | Mark Hentemann | June 26, 2005 | 4ACX10 | 7.34 |
| 58 | 8 | "8 Simple Rules for Buying My Teenage Daughter" | Greg Colton | Patrick Meighan | July 10, 2005 | 4ACX11 | 6.12 |
| 59 | 9 | "Breaking Out Is Hard to Do" | Kurt Dumas | Tom Devanney | July 17, 2005 | 4ACX12 | 5.65 |
| 60 | 10 | "Model Misbehavior" | Sarah Frost | Steve Callaghan | July 24, 2005 | 4ACX13 | 7.04 |
| 61 | 11 | "Peter's Got Woods" | Chuck Klein & Zac Moncrief | Danny Smith | September 11, 2005 | 4ACX14 | 9.13 |
| 62 | 12 | "Perfect Castaway" | James Purdum | John Viener | September 18, 2005 | 4ACX15 | 9.59 |
| 63 | 13 | "Jungle Love" | Seth Kearsley | Mark Hentemann | September 25, 2005 | 4ACX16 | 8.68 |
| 64 | 14 | "PTV" | Dan Povenmire | Alec Sulkin & Wellesley Wild | November 6, 2005 | 4ACX17 | 8.59 |
| 65 | 15 | "Brian Goes Back to College" | Greg Colton | Matt Fleckenstein | November 13, 2005 | 4ACX18 | 9.20 |
| 66 | 16 | "The Courtship of Stewie's Father" | Kurt Dumas | Kirker Butler | November 20, 2005 | 4ACX19 | 9.08 |
| 67 | 17 | "The Fat Guy Strangler" | Sarah Frost | Chris Sheridan | November 27, 2005 | 4ACX20 | 9.85 |
| 68 | 18 | "The Father, the Son, and the Holy Fonz" | James Purdum | Danny Smith | December 18, 2005 | 4ACX22 | 8.26 |
| 69 | 19 | "Brian Sings and Swings" | Chuck Klein & Zac Moncrief | Michael Rowe | January 8, 2006 | 4ACX21 | 8.10 |
| 70 | 20 | "Patriot Games" | Cyndi Tang | Mike Henry | January 29, 2006 | 4ACX25 | 9.08 |
| 71 | 21 | "I Take Thee Quagmire" | Seth Kearsley | Tom Maxwell, Don Woodard & Steve Callaghan | March 12, 2006 | 4ACX23 | 8.06 |
| 72 | 22 | "Sibling Rivalry" | Dan Povenmire | Cherry Chevapravatdumrong | March 26, 2006 | 4ACX24 | 8.22 |
| 73 | 23 | "Deep Throats" | Greg Colton | Alex Borstein | April 9, 2006 | 4ACX26 | 7.83 |
| 74 | 24 | "Peterotica" | Kurt Dumas | Patrick Meighan | April 23, 2006 | 4ACX27 | 7.91 |
| 75 | 25 | "You May Now Kiss the... Uh... Guy Who Receives" | Dominic Polcino | David A. Goodman | April 30, 2006 | 4ACX28 | 7.45 |
| 76 | 26 | "Petergeist" | Sarah Frost | Alec Sulkin & Wellesley Wild | May 7, 2006 | 4ACX29 | 8.47 |
| 77 | 27 | "The Griffin Family History" | Zac Moncrief | John Viener | May 14, 2006 | 4ACX30 | 8.03 |
| 78 | 28 | "Stewie B. Goode" (Note: "Stewie B. Goode", "Bango Was His Name, Oh!" and "Stu and Stewie's Excellent Adventure" make up the direct-to-DVD movie Stewie Griffin: The Untold Story.) (Part 1) | Pete Michels | Gary Janetti & Chris Sheridan | May 21, 2006 | 4ACX05 | 8.20 |
| 79 | 29 | "Bango Was His Name, Oh!" (Part 2) | Pete Michels | Alex Borstein | May 21, 2006 | 4ACX06 | 7.87 |
| 80 | 30 | "Stu and Stewie's Excellent Adventure" (Part 3) | Pete Michels | Steve Callaghan | May 21, 2006 | 4ACX07 | 8.14 |

=== Season 5 (2006–07) ===
| No. overall | No. in season | Title | Directed by | Written by | Original release date | Prod. code | U.S. viewers (millions) |
|---|---|---|---|---|---|---|---|
| 81 | 1 | "Stewie Loves Lois" | Mike Kim | Mark Hentemann | September 10, 2006 | 4ACX32 | 9.93 |
| 82 | 2 | "Mother Tucker" | James Purdum | Tom Devanney | September 17, 2006 | 4ACX31 | 9.23 |
| 83 | 3 | "Hell Comes to Quahog" | Dan Povenmire | Kirker Butler | September 24, 2006 | 4ACX33 | 9.66 |
| 84 | 4 | "Saving Private Brian" | Cyndi Tang | Cherry Chevapravatdumrong | November 5, 2006 | 4ACX34 | 8.45 |
| 85 | 5 | "Whistle While Your Wife Works" | Greg Colton | Steve Callaghan | November 12, 2006 | 4ACX35 | 9.04 |
| 86 | 6 | "Prick Up Your Ears" | James Purdum | Cherry Chevapravatdumrong | November 19, 2006 | 5ACX01 | 9.30 |
| 87 | 7 | "Chick Cancer" | Pete Michels | Alec Sulkin & Wellesley Wild | November 26, 2006 | 5ACX02 | 9.49 |
| 88 | 8 | "Barely Legal" | Zac Moncrief | Kirker Butler | December 17, 2006 | 5ACX03 | 8.91 |
| 89 | 9 | "Road to Rupert" | Dan Povenmire | Patrick Meighan | January 28, 2007 | 5ACX04 | 8.80 |
| 90 | 10 | "Peter's Two Dads" | Cyndi Tang | Danny Smith | February 11, 2007 | 5ACX05 | 7.97 |
| 91 | 11 | "The Tan Aquatic with Steve Zissou" | Julius Wu | Mark Hentemann | February 18, 2007 | 5ACX06 | 8.53 |
| 92 | 12 | "Airport '07" | John Holmquist | Tom Devanney | March 4, 2007 | 5ACX08 | 8.59 |
| 93 | 13 | "Bill & Peter's Bogus Journey" | Dominic Polcino | Steve Callaghan | March 11, 2007 | 5ACX07 | 8.05 |
| 94 | 14 | "No Meals on Wheels" | Greg Colton | Mike Henry | March 25, 2007 | 5ACX09 | 7.97 |
| 95 | 15 | "Boys Do Cry" | Brian Iles | Cherry Chevapravatdumrong | April 29, 2007 | 5ACX10 | 8.13 |
| 96 | 16 | "No Chris Left Behind" | Pete Michels | Patrick Meighan | May 6, 2007 | 5ACX11 | 7.95 |
| 97 | 17 | "It Takes a Village Idiot, and I Married One" | Zac Moncrief | Alex Borstein | May 13, 2007 | 5ACX12 | 7.22 |
| 98 | 18 | "Meet the Quagmires" | Dan Povenmire & Chris Robertson | Mark Hentemann | May 20, 2007 | 5ACX13 | 9.15 |

=== Season 6 (2007–08) ===
| No. overall | No. in season | Title | Directed by | Written by | Original release date | Prod. code | U.S. viewers (millions) |
|---|---|---|---|---|---|---|---|
| 99 | 1 | "Blue Harvest" | Dominic Polcino | Alec Sulkin | September 23, 2007 | 5ACX16 | 10.81 |
| 99 | 1 | "Blue Harvest" | Dominic Polcino | Alec Sulkin | September 23, 2007 | 5ACX22 | 10.81 |
| 100 | 2 | "Movin' Out (Brian's Song)" | Cyndi Tang | John Viener | September 30, 2007 | 5ACX14 | 7.98 |
| 101 | 3 | "Believe It or Not, Joe's Walking on Air" | Julius Wu | Andrew Goldberg | October 7, 2007 | 5ACX15 | 8.30 |
| 102 | 4 | "Stewie Kills Lois" | John Holmquist | David A. Goodman | November 4, 2007 | 5ACX17 | 10.46 |
| 103 | 5 | "Lois Kills Stewie" | Greg Colton | Steve Callaghan | November 11, 2007 | 5ACX18 | 10.39 |
| 104 | 6 | "Padre de Familia" | Pete Michels | Kirker Butler | November 18, 2007 | 5ACX20 | 10.55 |
| 105 | 7 | "Peter's Daughter" | Zac Moncrief | Chris Sheridan | November 25, 2007 | 5ACX21 | 9.52 |
| 106 | 8 | "McStroke" | Brian Iles | Wellesley Wild | January 13, 2008 | 5ACX19 | 11.33 |
| 107 | 9 | "Back to the Woods" | Brian Iles | Tom Devanney | February 17, 2008 | 6ACX02 | 7.29 |
| 108 | 10 | "Play It Again, Brian" | John Holmquist | Danny Smith | March 2, 2008 | 6ACX01 | 7.80 |
| 109 | 11 | "The Former Life of Brian" | Pete Michels | Steve Callaghan | April 27, 2008 | 6ACX04 | 8.42 |
| 110 | 12 | "Long John Peter" | Dominic Polcino | Wellesley Wild | May 4, 2008 | 6ACX06 | 7.69 |

=== Season 7 (2008–09) ===
| No. overall | No. in season | Title | Directed by | Written by | Original release date | Prod. code | U.S. viewers (millions) |
|---|---|---|---|---|---|---|---|
| 111 | 1 | "Love, Blactually" | Cyndi Tang | Mike Henry | September 28, 2008 | 6ACX03 | 9.09 |
| 112 | 2 | "I Dream of Jesus" | Mike Kim | Brian Scully | October 5, 2008 | 6ACX05 | 8.38 |
| 113 | 3 | "Road to Germany" | Greg Colton | Patrick Meighan | October 19, 2008 | 6ACX08 | 9.01 |
| 114 | 4 | "Baby Not on Board" | Julius Wu | Mark Hentemann | November 2, 2008 | 6ACX07 | 9.99 |
| 115 | 5 | "The Man with Two Brians" | Dominic Bianchi | John Viener | November 9, 2008 | 6ACX09 | 8.47 |
| 116 | 6 | "Tales of a Third Grade Nothing" | Jerry Langford | Alex Carter | November 16, 2008 | 6ACX10 | 8.57 |
| 117 | 7 | "Ocean's Three and a Half" | John Holmquist | Cherry Chevapravatdumrong | February 15, 2009 | 6ACX11 | 7.41 |
| 118 | 8 | "Family Gay" | Brian Iles | Richard Appel | March 8, 2009 | 6ACX12 | 7.09 |
| 119 | 9 | "The Juice Is Loose" | Cyndi Tang | Andrew Goldberg | March 15, 2009 | 6ACX13 | 7.29 |
| 120 | 10 | "Fox-y Lady" | Pete Michels | Matt Fleckenstein | March 22, 2009 | 6ACX14 | 7.34 |
| 121 | 11 | "Not All Dogs Go to Heaven" | Greg Colton | Danny Smith | March 29, 2009 | 6ACX17 | 8.12 |
| 122 | 12 | "420" | Julius Wu | Patrick Meighan | April 19, 2009 | 6ACX16 | 7.34 |
| 123 | 13 | "Stew-Roids" | Jerry Langford | Alec Sulkin | April 26, 2009 | 6ACX18 | 6.67 |
| 124 | 14 | "We Love You, Conrad" | John Holmquist | Cherry Chevapravatdumrong | May 3, 2009 | 6ACX19 | 6.57 |
| 125 | 15 | "Three Kings" | Dominic Bianchi | Alec Sulkin | May 10, 2009 | 6ACX15 | 6.36 |
| 126 | 16 | "Peter's Progress" | Brian Iles | Wellesley Wild | May 17, 2009 | 6ACX20 | 7.35 |

=== Season 8 (2009–10) ===
| No. overall | No. in season | Title | Directed by | Written by | Original release date | Prod. code | U.S. viewers (millions) |
|---|---|---|---|---|---|---|---|
| 127 | 1 | "Road to the Multiverse" | Greg Colton | Wellesley Wild | September 27, 2009 | 7ACX06 | 10.11 |
| 128 | 2 | "Family Goy" | James Purdum | Mark Hentemann | October 4, 2009 | 7ACX01 | 9.86 |
| 129 | 3 | "Spies Reminiscent of Us" | Cyndi Tang | Alec Sulkin | October 11, 2009 | 7ACX03 | 8.97 |
| 130 | 4 | "Brian's Got a Brand New Bag" | Pete Michels | Tom Devanney | November 8, 2009 | 7ACX02 | 7.26 |
| 131 | 5 | "Hannah Banana" | John Holmquist | Cherry Chevapravatdumrong | November 8, 2009 | 7ACX05 | 8.00 |
| 132 | 6 | "Quagmire's Baby" | Jerry Langford | Patrick Meighan | November 15, 2009 | 7ACX04 | 8.50 |
| 133 | 7 | "Jerome Is the New Black" | Brian Iles | John Viener | November 22, 2009 | 7ACX08 | 7.48 |
| 134 | 8 | "Dog Gone" | Julius Wu | Steve Callaghan | November 29, 2009 | 7ACX07 | 8.50 |
| 135 | 9 | "Business Guy" | Pete Michels | Andrew Goldberg & Alex Carter | December 13, 2009 | 7ACX11 | 7.66 |
| 136 | 10 | "Big Man on Hippocampus" | Dominic Bianchi | Brian Scully | January 3, 2010 | 7ACX09 | 8.16 |
| 137 | 11 | "Dial Meg for Murder" | Cyndi Tang | Alex Carter & Andrew Goldberg | January 31, 2010 | 7ACX12 | 6.19 |
| 138 | 12 | "Extra Large Medium" | John Holmquist | Steve Callaghan | February 14, 2010 | 7ACX14 | 6.44 |
| 139 | 13 | "Go, Stewie, Go!" | Greg Colton | Gary Janetti | March 14, 2010 | 7ACX15 | 6.66 |
| 140 | 14 | "Peter-assment" | Julius Wu | Chris Sheridan | March 21, 2010 | 7ACX16 | 6.67 |
| 141 | 15 | "Brian Griffin's House of Payne" | Jerry Langford | Spencer Porter | March 28, 2010 | 7ACX13 | 7.32 |
| 142 | 16 | "April in Quahog" | Joseph Lee | John Viener | April 11, 2010 | 7ACX18 | 6.96 |
| 143 | 17 | "Brian & Stewie" | Dominic Bianchi | Gary Janetti | May 2, 2010 | 7ACX20 | 7.40 |
| 144 | 18 | "Quagmire's Dad" | Pete Michels | Tom Devanney | May 9, 2010 | 7ACX19 | 7.22 |
| 145 | 19 | "The Splendid Source" | Brian Iles | Based on a short story by : Richard Matheson; Teleplay by : Mark Hentemann | May 16, 2010 | 7ACX17 | 7.71 |
| 146 | 20 | "Something, Something, Something, Dark Side" | Dominic Polcino | Kirker Butler | May 23, 2010 (Note: This episode was first released in Something, Something, Something, Dark Side DVD on December 22, 2009.) | 6ACX21 | 6.31 |
| 146 | 20 | "Something, Something, Something, Dark Side" | Dominic Polcino | Kirker Butler | May 23, 2010 | 6ACX22 | 6.31 |
| 147 | 21 | "Partial Terms of Endearment" | Joseph Lee | Danny Smith | June 20, 2010 (BBC Three); September 28, 2010 (DVD) (Note: Fox has stated the episode "Partial Terms of Endearment" has been refused airtime on their network. However, it premiered on British television on June 20, 2010 on BBC Three. The episode was later aired on Australian television on April 11, 2011 on 7mate, and on Dutch television on August 7, 2011 on Comedy Central (Netherlands). An airdate has not been given for the United States (if the episode will air at all), but it was only released on DVD in Region 1 on September 28, 2010.) | 7ACX10 | 1.04 (BBC Three) |

=== Season 9 (2010–11) ===
| No. overall | No. in season | Title | Directed by | Written by | Original release date | Prod. code | U.S. viewers (millions) |
|---|---|---|---|---|---|---|---|
| 148 | 1 | "And Then There Were Fewer" | Dominic Polcino | Cherry Chevapravatdumrong | September 26, 2010 | 8ACX01 | 9.13 |
| 148 | 1 | "And Then There Were Fewer" | Dominic Polcino | Cherry Chevapravatdumrong | September 26, 2010 | 8ACX02 | 9.13 |
| 149 | 2 | "Excellence in Broadcasting" | John Holmquist | Patrick Meighan | October 3, 2010 | 8ACX03 | 7.98 |
| 150 | 3 | "Welcome Back, Carter" | Cyndi Tang | Wellesley Wild | October 10, 2010 | 8ACX04 | 6.97 |
| 151 | 4 | "Halloween on Spooner Street" | Jerry Langford | Andrew Goldberg | November 7, 2010 | 8ACX06 | 8.00 |
| 152 | 5 | "Baby, You Knock Me Out" | Julius Wu | Alex Carter | November 14, 2010 | 8ACX05 | 7.06 |
| 153 | 6 | "Brian Writes a Bestseller" | Joseph Lee | Gary Janetti | November 21, 2010 | 8ACX07 | 6.59 |
| 154 | 7 | "Road to the North Pole" | Greg Colton | Chris Sheridan & Danny Smith | December 12, 2010 | 8ACX08 | 8.03 |
| 154 | 7 | "Road to the North Pole" | Greg Colton | Chris Sheridan & Danny Smith | December 12, 2010 | 8ACX09 | 8.03 |
| 155 | 8 | "New Kidney in Town" | Pete Michels | Matt Harrigan & Dave Willis | January 9, 2011 | 8ACX10 | 9.33 |
| 156 | 9 | "And I'm Joyce Kinney" | Dominic Bianchi | Alec Sulkin | January 16, 2011 | 8ACX12 | 7.06 |
| 157 | 10 | "Friends of Peter G." | John Holmquist | Brian Scully | February 13, 2011 | 8ACX13 | 5.98 |
| 158 | 11 | "German Guy" | Cyndi Tang | Patrick Meighan | February 20, 2011 | 8ACX14 | 6.57 |
| 159 | 12 | "The Hand That Rocks the Wheelchair" | Brian Iles | Tom Devanney | March 6, 2011 | 8ACX11 | 6.33 |
| 160 | 13 | "Trading Places" | Joseph Lee | Steve Callaghan | March 20, 2011 | 8ACX17 | 6.55 |
| 161 | 14 | "Tiegs for Two" | Jerry Langford | John Viener | April 10, 2011 | 8ACX16 | 6.59 |
| 162 | 15 | "Brothers & Sisters" | Julius Wu | Alex Carter | April 17, 2011 | 8ACX15 | 5.98 |
| 163 | 16 | "The Big Bang Theory" | Dominic Polcino | David A. Goodman | May 8, 2011 | 8ACX18 | 6.52 |
| 164 | 17 | "Foreign Affairs" | Pete Michels | Anthony Blasucci & Mike Desilets | May 15, 2011 | 8ACX19 | 6.44 |
| 165 | 18 | "It's a Trap!" | Peter Shin | Cherry Chevapravatdumrong & David A. Goodman | May 22, 2011 (Note: This episode was first released in It's a Trap! and Laugh It Up, Fuzzball: The Family Guy Trilogy DVD on December 21, 2010.) | 7ACX21 | 5.84 |
| 165 | 18 | "It's a Trap!" | Peter Shin | Cherry Chevapravatdumrong & David A. Goodman | May 22, 2011 | 7ACX22 | 5.84 |

=== Season 10 (2011–12) ===
| No. overall | No. in season | Title | Directed by | Written by | Original release date | Prod. code | U.S. viewers (millions) |
|---|---|---|---|---|---|---|---|
| 166 | 1 | "Lottery Fever" | Greg Colton | Andrew Goldberg | September 25, 2011 | 9ACX01 | 7.69 |
| 167 | 2 | "Seahorse Seashell Party" | Brian Iles | Wellesley Wild | October 2, 2011 | 8ACX20 | 6.99 |
| 168 | 3 | "Screams of Silence: The Story of Brenda Q" | Dominic Bianchi | Alec Sulkin | October 30, 2011 | 8ACX21 | 5.96 |
| 169 | 4 | "Stewie Goes for a Drive" | Julius Wu | Gary Janetti | November 6, 2011 | 9ACX02 | 5.82 |
| 170 | 5 | "Back to the Pilot" | Dominic Bianchi | Mark Hentemann | November 13, 2011 | 9ACX08 | 6.01 |
| 171 | 6 | "Thanksgiving" | Jerry Langford | Patrick Meighan | November 20, 2011 | 9ACX04 | 6.02 |
| 172 | 7 | "Amish Guy" | John Holmquist | Mark Hentemann | November 27, 2011 | 8ACX22 | 5.50 |
| 173 | 8 | "Cool Hand Peter" | Brian Iles | Artie Johann & Shawn Ries | December 4, 2011 | 9ACX05 | 7.14 |
| 174 | 9 | "Grumpy Old Man" | John Holmquist | Dave Ihlenfeld & David Wright | December 11, 2011 | 9ACX07 | 6.10 |
| 175 | 10 | "Quagmire and Meg" | Joseph Lee | Tom Devanney | January 8, 2012 | 9ACX03 | 6.23 |
| 176 | 11 | "The Blind Side" | Bob Bowen | Cherry Chevapravatdumrong | January 15, 2012 | 9ACX06 | 8.31 |
| 177 | 12 | "Livin' on a Prayer" | Pete Michels | Danny Smith | January 29, 2012 | 9ACX09 | 5.92 |
| 178 | 13 | "Tom Tucker: The Man and His Dream" | Greg Colton | Alex Carter | February 12, 2012 | 9ACX10 | 5.03 |
| 179 | 14 | "Be Careful What You Fish For" | Julius Wu | Steve Callaghan | February 19, 2012 | 9ACX11 | 5.47 |
| 180 | 15 | "Burning Down the Bayit" | Jerry Langford | Chris Sheridan | March 4, 2012 | 9ACX13 | 5.33 |
| 181 | 16 | "Killer Queen" | Joseph Lee | Spencer Porter | March 11, 2012 | 9ACX12 | 5.74 |
| 182 | 17 | "Forget-Me-Not" | Brian Iles | David A. Goodman | March 18, 2012 | 9ACX14 | 5.61 |
| 183 | 18 | "You Can't Do That on Television, Peter" | Bob Bowen | Julius Sharpe | April 1, 2012 | 9ACX15 | 5.05 |
| 184 | 19 | "Mr. and Mrs. Stewie" | Joe Vaux | Gary Janetti | April 29, 2012 | 9ACX17 | 5.63 |
| 185 | 20 | "Leggo My Meg-O" | John Holmquist | Brian Scully | May 6, 2012 | 9ACX16 | 5.64 |
| 186 | 21 | "Tea Peter" | Pete Michels | Patrick Meighan | May 13, 2012 | 9ACX18 | 4.94 |
| 187 | 22 | "Family Guy Viewer Mail #2" | Greg Colton | Tom Devanney | May 20, 2012 | 9ACX19 | 5.35 |
| 187 | 22 | "Family Guy Viewer Mail #2" | Greg Colton | Alec Sulkin | May 20, 2012 | 9ACX19 | 5.35 |
| 187 | 22 | "Family Guy Viewer Mail #2" | Greg Colton | Deepak Sethi | May 20, 2012 | 9ACX19 | 5.35 |
| 188 | 23 | "Internal Affairs" | Julius Wu | Wellesley Wild | May 20, 2012 | 9ACX20 | 5.35 |

=== Season 11 (2012–13) ===
| No. overall | No. in season | Title | Directed by | Written by | Original release date | Prod. code | U.S. viewers (millions) |
|---|---|---|---|---|---|---|---|
| 189 | 1 | "Into Fat Air" | Joseph Lee | Alec Sulkin | September 30, 2012 | 9ACX21 | 6.55 |
| 190 | 2 | "Ratings Guy" | James Purdum | Dave Ihlenfeld & David Wright | October 7, 2012 | AACX01 | 6.70 |
| 191 | 3 | "The Old Man and the Big 'C'" | Brian Iles | Mike Desilets & Anthony Blasucci | November 4, 2012 (Note: This episode was originally scheduled to air on October 21, 2012, but was preempted as a result of a rainout of 2012 National League Championship Series Game 6.) | 9ACX22 | 5.11 |
| 192 | 4 | "Yug Ylimaf" | John Holmquist | Mark Hentemann | November 11, 2012 | AACX04 | 5.57 |
| 193 | 5 | "Joe's Revenge" | Bob Bowen | Julius Sharpe | November 18, 2012 | AACX03 | 5.14 |
| 194 | 6 | "Lois Comes Out of Her Shell" | Joe Vaux | Danny Smith | November 25, 2012 | AACX05 | 5.77 |
| 195 | 7 | "Friends Without Benefits" | Jerry Langford | Cherry Chevapravatdumrong | December 9, 2012 | AACX02 | 5.64 |
| 196 | 8 | "Jesus, Mary and Joseph!" | Julius Wu | Tom Devanney | December 23, 2012 (Note: This episode was originally scheduled to air on December 16, 2012, but was pulled from its planned airing as a result of the Sandy Hook Elementary School shooting that occurred two days prior.) | AACX07 | 5.49 |
| 197 | 9 | "Space Cadet" | Pete Michels | Alex Carter | January 6, 2013 | AACX06 | 7.21 |
| 198 | 10 | "Brian's Play" | Joseph Lee | Gary Janetti | January 13, 2013 | AACX08 | 6.01 |
| 199 | 11 | "The Giggity Wife" | Brian Iles | Andrew Goldberg | January 27, 2013 | AACX09 | 5.63 |
| 200 | 12 | "Valentine's Day in Quahog" | Bob Bowen | Daniel Palladino | February 10, 2013 | AACX11 | 4.71 |
| 201 | 13 | "Chris Cross" | Jerry Langford | Anthony Blasucci & Mike Desilets | February 17, 2013 | AACX10 | 4.87 |
| 202 | 14 | "Call Girl" | John Holmquist | Wellesley Wild | March 10, 2013 | AACX12 | 5.27 |
| 203 | 15 | "Turban Cowboy" | Joe Vaux | Artie Johann & Shawn Ries | March 17, 2013 | AACX13 | 4.92 |
| 204 | 16 | "12 and a Half Angry Men" | Pete Michels | Ted Jessup | March 24, 2013 | AACX14 | 5.16 |
| 205 | 17 | "Bigfat" | Julius Wu | Brian Scully | April 14, 2013 | AACX15 | 5.02 |
| 206 | 18 | "Total Recall" | Joseph Lee | Kristin Long | April 28, 2013 | AACX16 | 4.89 |
| 207 | 19 | "Save the Clam" | Brian Iles | Chris Sheridan | May 5, 2013 | AACX18 | 4.79 |
| 208 | 20 | "Farmer Guy" | Mike Kim | Patrick Meighan | May 12, 2013 | AACX19 | 4.82 |
| 209 | 21 | "Roads to Vegas" | Greg Colton | Steve Callaghan | May 19, 2013 | AACX20 | 5.28 |
| 210 | 22 | "No Country Club for Old Men" | Jerry Langford | Teresa Hsiao | May 19, 2013 | AACX21 | 5.16 |

=== Season 12 (2013–14) ===
| No. overall | No. in season | Title | Directed by | Written by | Original release date | Prod. code | U.S. viewers (millions) |
|---|---|---|---|---|---|---|---|
| 211 | 1 | "Finders Keepers" | John Holmquist | Mike Desilets & Anthony Blasucci | September 29, 2013 | BACX01 | 5.23 |
| 212 | 2 | "Vestigial Peter" | Julius Wu | Brian Scully | October 6, 2013 | BACX02 | 5.20 |
| 213 | 3 | "Quagmire's Quagmire" | Pete Michels | Cherry Chevapravatdumrong | November 3, 2013 | BACX03 | 4.87 |
| 214 | 4 | "A Fistful of Meg" | Joe Vaux | Dominic Bianchi & Joe Vaux | November 10, 2013 | AACX22 | 4.18 |
| 215 | 5 | "Boopa-dee Bappa-dee" | Mike Kim | Wellesley Wild | November 17, 2013 | BACX04 | 4.46 |
| 216 | 6 | "Life of Brian" | Joseph Lee | Alex Carter | November 24, 2013 | BACX05 | 4.58 |
| 217 | 7 | "Into Harmony's Way" | Brian Iles | Julius Sharpe | December 8, 2013 | BACX06 | 5.36 |
| 218 | 8 | "Christmas Guy" | Greg Colton | Patrick Meighan | December 15, 2013 | BACX07 | 6.37 |
| 219 | 9 | "Peter Problems" | Bob Bowen | Teresa Hsiao | January 5, 2014 | BACX08 | 5.76 |
| 220 | 10 | "Grimm Job" | Joe Vaux | Alec Sulkin | January 12, 2014 | BACX09 | 5.22 |
| 221 | 11 | "Brian's a Bad Father" | Jerry Langford | Chris Sheridan | January 26, 2014 | BACX10 | 4.11 |
| 222 | 12 | "Mom's the Word" | John Holmquist | Ted Jessup | March 9, 2014 | BACX11 | 4.56 |
| 223 | 13 | "3 Acts of God" | Bob Bowen | Alec Sulkin | March 16, 2014 | AACX17 | 4.62 |
| 224 | 14 | "Fresh Heir" | Mike Kim | Steve Callaghan | March 23, 2014 | BACX13 | 4.38 |
| 225 | 15 | "Secondhand Spoke" | Julius Wu | Dave Ihlenfeld & David Wright | March 30, 2014 | BACX12 | 4.17 |
| 226 | 16 | "Herpe the Love Sore" | Greg Colton | Andrew Goldberg | April 6, 2014 | BACX16 | 4.77 |
| 227 | 17 | "The Most Interesting Man in the World" | Joseph Lee | Tom Devanney | April 13, 2014 | BACX14 | 4.39 |
| 228 | 18 | "Baby Got Black" | Brian Iles | Kevin Biggins & Travis Bowe | April 27, 2014 | BACX15 | 4.02 |
| 229 | 19 | "Meg Stinks!" | Bob Bowen | Danny Smith | May 4, 2014 | BACX17 | 4.40 |
| 230 | 20 | "He's Bla-ack!" | Steve Robertson | Julius Sharpe | May 11, 2014 | BACX19 | 4.16 |
| 231 | 21 | "Chap Stewie" | Joe Vaux | Artie Johann & Shawn Ries | May 18, 2014 | BACX18 | 3.88 |

=== Season 13 (2014–15) ===
| No. overall | No. in season | Title | Directed by | Written by | Original release date | Prod. code | U.S. viewers (millions) |
|---|---|---|---|---|---|---|---|
| 232 | 1 | "The Simpsons Guy" | Peter Shin | Patrick Meighan | September 28, 2014 | BACX22 | 8.45 |
| 232 | 1 | "The Simpsons Guy" | Peter Shin | Patrick Meighan | September 28, 2014 | BACX23 | 8.45 |
| 233 | 2 | "The Book of Joe" | Mike Kim | Mike Desilets | October 5, 2014 | CACX01 | 3.63 |
| 234 | 3 | "Baking Bad" | Jerry Langford | Mark Hentemann | October 19, 2014 | BACX20 | 4.74 |
| 235 | 4 | "Brian the Closer" | John Holmquist | Steve Marmel | November 9, 2014 | BACX21 | 3.63 |
| 236 | 5 | "Turkey Guys" | Julius Wu | Cherry Chevapravatdumrong | November 16, 2014 | CACX02 | 4.46 |
| 237 | 6 | "The 2000-Year-Old Virgin" | Joseph Lee | Ted Jessup | December 7, 2014 | CACX03 | 4.44 |
| 238 | 7 | "Stewie, Chris, & Brian's Excellent Adventure" | Joe Vaux | Alex Carter | January 4, 2015 | CACX04 | 5.53 |
| 239 | 8 | "Our Idiot Brian" | John Holmquist | Aaron Lee | January 11, 2015 | CACX05 | 4.12 |
| 240 | 9 | "This Little Piggy" | Brian Iles | Kristin Long | January 25, 2015 | CACX06 | 3.19 |
| 241 | 10 | "Quagmire's Mom" | Greg Colton | Tom Devanney | February 8, 2015 | CACX07 | 2.81 |
| 242 | 11 | "Encyclopedia Griffin" | Jerry Langford | Lew Morton | February 15, 2015 | CACX08 | 2.51 |
| 243 | 12 | "Stewie Is Enceinte" | Steve Robertson | Gary Janetti | March 8, 2015 | CACX09 | 3.98 |
| 244 | 13 | "Dr. C and the Women" | Mike Kim | Travis Bowe | March 15, 2015 | CACX10 | 3.45 |
| 245 | 14 | "#JOLO" | Julius Wu | Artie Johann & Shawn Ries | April 12, 2015 | CACX11 | 3.11 |
| 246 | 15 | "Once Bitten" | Joseph Lee | Anthony Blasucci | April 19, 2015 | CACX12 | 3.30 |
| 247 | 16 | "Roasted Guy" | Joe Vaux | Andrew Goldberg | April 26, 2015 | CACX13 | 3.17 |
| 248 | 17 | "Fighting Irish" | Brian Iles | Jaydi Samuels | May 3, 2015 | CACX15 | 3.68 |
| 249 | 18 | "Take My Wife" | John Holmquist | Kevin Biggins | May 17, 2015 | CACX14 | 2.85 |

=== Season 14 (2015–16) ===
| No. overall | No. in season | Title | Directed by | Written by | Original release date | Prod. code | U.S. viewers (millions) |
|---|---|---|---|---|---|---|---|
| 250 | 1 | "Pilling Them Softly" | Jerry Langford | Hayes Davenport | September 27, 2015 | CACX17 | 2.87 |
| 251 | 2 | "Papa Has a Rollin' Son" | Steve Robertson | Danny Smith | October 4, 2015 | CACX18 | 3.56 |
| 252 | 3 | "Guy, Robot" | Mike Kim | Chris Regan | October 11, 2015 | DACX02 | 2.79 |
| 253 | 4 | "Peternormal Activity" | Greg Colton | Chris Sheridan | October 25, 2015 | CACX16 | 3.85 |
| 254 | 5 | "Peter, Chris & Brian" | Joe Vaux | Patrick Meighan | November 8, 2015 | DACX03 | 2.58 |
| 255 | 6 | "Peter's Sister" | John Holmquist | Tom Devanney | November 15, 2015 | DACX04 | 2.91 |
| 256 | 7 | "Hot Pocket-Dial" | Steve Robertson | Aaron Lee | November 22, 2015 | DACX06 | 3.37 |
| 257 | 8 | "Brokeback Swanson" | Julius Wu | Ted Jessup | December 6, 2015 | DACX07 | 3.63 |
| 258 | 9 | "A Shot in the Dark" | Brian Iles | Mike Desilets | December 13, 2015 | DACX05 | 3.74 |
| 259 | 10 | "Candy, Quahog Marshmallow" | Joseph Lee | Cherry Chevapravatdumrong | January 3, 2016 | DACX01 | 3.26 |
| 260 | 11 | "The Peanut Butter Kid" | Greg Colton | Artie Johann | January 10, 2016 | DACX08 | 3.92 |
| 261 | 12 | "Scammed Yankees" | Jerry Langford | Ray James | January 17, 2016 | DACX09 | 3.40 |
| 262 | 13 | "An App a Day" | Mike Kim | Anthony Blasucci | February 14, 2016 | DACX12 | 2.57 |
| 263 | 14 | "Underage Peter" | Joseph Lee | Shawn Ries | February 21, 2016 | DACX13 | 2.72 |
| 264 | 15 | "A Lot Going on Upstairs" | Joe Vaux | Steve Callaghan | March 6, 2016 | DACX11 | 2.74 |
| 265 | 16 | "The Heartbreak Dog" | Brian Iles | Lew Morton | March 13, 2016 | DACX14 | 2.98 |
| 266 | 17 | "Take a Letter" | John Holmquist | Kevin Biggins | April 17, 2016 | DACX15 | 2.93 |
| 267 | 18 | "The New Adventures of Old Tom" | Steve Robertson | Travis Bowe | May 8, 2016 | DACX16 | 2.76 |
| 268 | 19 | "Run, Chris, Run" | Julius Wu | Damien Fahey | May 15, 2016 | DACX17 | 2.65 |
| 269 | 20 | "Road to India" | Greg Colton | Danny Smith | May 22, 2016 | DACX18 | 2.59 |

=== Season 15 (2016–17) ===
| No. overall | No. in season | Title | Directed by | Written by | Original release date | Prod. code | U.S. viewers (millions) |
|---|---|---|---|---|---|---|---|
| 270 | 1 | "The Boys in the Band" | Joseph Lee | Chris Regan | September 25, 2016 | EACX01 | 2.80 |
| 271 | 2 | "Bookie of the Year" | Jerry Langford | Daniel Peck | October 2, 2016 | DACX10 | 3.47 |
| 272 | 3 | "American Gigg-olo" | Mike Kim | Chris Sheridan | October 16, 2016 | DACX19 | 3.68 |
| 273 | 4 | "Inside Family Guy" | Joe Vaux | Andrew Goldberg | October 23, 2016 | DACX20 | 2.49 |
| 274 | 5 | "Chris Has Got a Date, Date, Date, Date, Date" | Brian Iles | Artie Johann | November 6, 2016 | EACX02 | 2.60 |
| 275 | 6 | "Hot Shots" | John Holmquist | David A. Goodman | November 13, 2016 | EACX03 | 3.58 |
| 276 | 7 | "High School English" | Steve Robertson | Ted Jessup | November 20, 2016 | EACX04 | 2.74 |
| 277 | 8 | "Carter and Tricia" | Mike Kim | Patrick Meighan | December 4, 2016 | EACX05 | 3.45 |
| 278 | 9 | "How the Griffin Stole Christmas" | Julius Wu | Aaron Lee | December 11, 2016 | EACX06 | 3.05 |
| 279 | 10 | "Passenger Fatty-Seven" | Greg Colton | Alex Carter | January 8, 2017 | EACX07 | 4.00 |
| 280 | 11 | "Gronkowsbees" | Jerry Langford | Cherry Chevapravatdumrong | January 15, 2017 | EACX08 | 3.55 |
| 281 | 12 | "Peter's Def Jam" | Joe Vaux | Anthony Blasucci | February 12, 2017 | EACX09 | 1.86 |
| 282 | 13 | "The Finer Strings" | Joseph Lee | Shawn Ries | February 19, 2017 | EACX10 | 2.26 |
| 283 | 14 | "The Dating Game" | Brian Iles | Tom Devanney | March 5, 2017 | EACX11 | 2.48 |
| 284 | 15 | "Cop and a Half-wit" | John Holmquist | Ray James | March 12, 2017 | EACX12 | 2.51 |
| 285 | 16 | "Saturated Fat Guy" | Steve Robertson | Damien Fahey | March 19, 2017 | EACX13 | 2.34 |
| 286 | 17 | "Peter's Lost Youth" | Julius Wu | Danny Smith | March 26, 2017 | EACX14 | 2.17 |
| 287 | 18 | "The Peter Principal" | Greg Colton | Steve Callaghan | April 30, 2017 | EACX16 | 2.42 |
| 288 | 19 | "Dearly Deported" | Jerry Langford | Mike Desilets | May 21, 2017 | EACX17 | 2.14 |
| 289 | 20 | "A House Full of Peters" | Joseph Lee | Chris Sheridan | May 21, 2017 | EACX19 | 2.14 |

=== Season 16 (2017–18) ===
| No. overall | No. in season | Title | Directed by | Written by | Original release date | Prod. code | U.S. viewers (millions) |
|---|---|---|---|---|---|---|---|
| 290 | 1 | "Emmy-Winning Episode" | James Purdum, Dominic Bianchi & Peter Shin | Aaron Lee | October 1, 2017 | FACX06 | 2.80 |
| 291 | 2 | "Foxx in the Men House" | Brian Iles | Andrew Goldberg | October 8, 2017 | EACX20 | 3.05 |
| 292 | 3 | "Nanny Goats" | Steve Robertson | Tom Devanney | October 15, 2017 | FACX02 | 2.54 |
| 293 | 4 | "Follow the Money" | Mike Kim | Kevin Biggins | October 22, 2017 | EACX15 | 2.69 |
| 294 | 5 | "Three Directors" | Joe Vaux | Travis Bowe | November 5, 2017 | EACX18 | 2.31 |
| 295 | 6 | "The D in Apartment 23" | Julius Wu | Artie Johann | November 12, 2017 | FACX03 | 3.11 |
| 296 | 7 | "Petey IV" | Mike Kim | Anthony Blasucci | November 19, 2017 | FACX04 | 2.08 |
| 297 | 8 | "Crimes and Meg's Demeanor" | Greg Colton | Mike Desilets | December 3, 2017 | FACX05 | 2.59 |
| 298 | 9 | "Don't Be a Dickens at Christmas" | Jerry Langford | Danny Smith | December 10, 2017 | FACX07 | 2.98 |
| 299 | 10 | "Boy (Dog) Meets Girl (Dog)" | Brian Iles | Steve Callaghan | January 7, 2018 | FACX09 | 3.40 |
| 300 | 11 | "Dog Bites Bear" | John Holmquist | Cherry Chevapravatdumrong | January 14, 2018 | FACX01 | 4.10 |
| 301 | 12 | "Send in Stewie, Please" | Joe Vaux | Gary Janetti | March 18, 2018 | FACX10 | 2.24 |
| 302 | 13 | "V Is for Mystery" | Joseph Lee | David A. Goodman | March 25, 2018 | FACX08 | 1.91 |
| 303 | 14 | "Veteran Guy" | John Holmquist | Patrick Meighan | April 1, 2018 | FACX11 | 2.05 |
| 304 | 15 | "The Woof of Wall Street" | Steve Robertson | Alex Carter | April 8, 2018 | FACX12 | 1.93 |
| 305 | 16 | "Family Guy Through the Years" | Julius Wu | Chris Sheridan | April 22, 2018 | FACX13 | 2.00 |
| 306 | 17 | "Switch the Flip" | Mike Kim | Kevin Biggins | April 29, 2018 | FACX14 | 2.26 |
| 307 | 18 | "HTTPete" | Greg Colton | Damien Fahey | May 6, 2018 | FACX15 | 1.92 |
| 308 | 19 | "The Unkindest Cut" | Jerry Langford | Mark Hentemann | May 13, 2018 | FACX16 | 2.15 |
| 309 | 20 | "Are You There God? It's Me, Peter" | Joseph Lee | Travis Bowe | May 20, 2018 | FACX17 | 1.83 |

=== Season 17 (2018–19) ===
| No. overall | No. in season | Title | Directed by | Written by | Original release date | Prod. code | U.S. viewers (millions) |
|---|---|---|---|---|---|---|---|
| 310 | 1 | "Married... with Cancer" | Mike Kim | Aaron Lee | September 30, 2018 | HACX02 | 2.57 |
| 311 | 2 | "Dead Dog Walking" | Julius Wu | Chris Sheridan | October 7, 2018 | HACX03 | 2.69 |
| 312 | 3 | "Pal Stewie" | Brian Iles | John Viener & Matt Pabian | October 14, 2018 | FACX18 | 1.99 |
| 313 | 4 | "Big Trouble in Little Quahog" | Joe Vaux | Dominic Bianchi & Joe Vaux | October 21, 2018 | FACX19 | 2.57 |
| 314 | 5 | "Regarding Carter" | Greg Colton | Alex Carter | November 4, 2018 | HACX04 | 2.60 |
| 315 | 6 | "Stand by Meg" | Jerry Langford | Billy Domineau | November 11, 2018 | HACX05 | 2.29 |
| 316 | 7 | "Griffin Winter Games" | Steve Robertson | Artie Johann | November 18, 2018 | HACX01 | 2.66 |
| 317 | 8 | "Con Heiress" | Brian Iles | Mark Hentemann | December 2, 2018 | HACX07 | 2.72 |
| 318 | 9 | "Pawtucket Pete" | John Holmquist | Chris Regan | December 9, 2018 | FACX20 | 3.50 |
| 319 | 10 | "Hefty Shades of Gray" | Joseph Lee | Mike Desilets | January 6, 2019 | HACX08 | 2.42 |
| 320 | 11 | "Trump Guy" | Joe Vaux | Patrick Meighan | January 13, 2019 | HACX09 | 4.04 |
| 321 | 12 | "Bri, Robot" | John Holmquist | Patrick Meighan | February 10, 2019 | HACX10 | 1.81 |
| 322 | 13 | "Trans-Fat" | Steve Robertson | Wellesley Wild | February 17, 2019 | HACX11 | 2.23 |
| 323 | 14 | "Family Guy Lite" | Mike Kim | Anthony Blasucci | March 3, 2019 | HACX12 | 2.10 |
| 324 | 15 | "No Giggity, No Doubt" | Julius Wu | Kevin Biggins | March 10, 2019 | HACX13 | 2.25 |
| 325 | 16 | "You Can't Handle the Booth!" | Greg Colton | Damien Fahey | March 24, 2019 | HACX14 | 2.01 |
| 326 | 17 | "Island Adventure" | Jerry Langford | Steve Callaghan | March 31, 2019 | HACX06 | 2.15 |
| 327 | 18 | "Throw It Away" | Brian Iles | Cherry Chevapravatdumrong | April 28, 2019 | HACX15 | 1.95 |
| 328 | 19 | "Girl, Internetted" | Joe Vaux | Chris Regan | May 5, 2019 | HACX17 | 1.72 |
| 329 | 20 | "Adam West High" | Joseph Lee | Artie Johann | May 12, 2019 | HACX16 | 1.78 |

=== Season 18 (2019–20) ===
| No. overall | No. in season | Title | Directed by | Written by | Original release date | Prod. code | U.S. viewers (millions) |
|---|---|---|---|---|---|---|---|
| 330 | 1 | "Yacht Rocky" | John Holmquist | Travis Bowe | September 29, 2019 | HACX18 | 1.88 |
| 331 | 2 | "Bri-Da" | Steve Robertson | Tom Devanney | October 6, 2019 | HACX19 | 2.31 |
| 332 | 3 | "Absolutely Babulous" | Mike Kim | Mark Hentemann & Ted Jessup | October 13, 2019 | HACX20 | 1.82 |
| 333 | 4 | "Disney's The Reboot" | Greg Colton | Kirker Butler | October 20, 2019 | JACX02 | 2.64 |
| 334 | 5 | "Cat Fight" | Jerry Langford | Steve Callaghan | November 3, 2019 | JACX03 | 1.61 |
| 335 | 6 | "Peter & Lois' Wedding" | Joe Vaux | Mark Hentemann | November 10, 2019 | JACX05 | 2.19 |
| 336 | 7 | "Heart Burn" | Steve Robertson | Matt Pabian & Matt McElaney | November 17, 2019 | JACX10 | 1.92 |
| 337 | 8 | "Shanksgiving" | Brian Iles | Alex Carter | November 24, 2019 | JACX04 | 2.28 |
| 338 | 9 | "Christmas Is Coming" | John Holmquist | Travis Bowe | December 15, 2019 | JACX06 | 2.30 |
| 339 | 10 | "Connie's Celica" | Joseph Lee | Kevin Biggins | January 5, 2020 | JACX08 | 1.85 |
| 340 | 11 | "Short Cuts" | Julius Wu | Kirker Butler | February 16, 2020 | JACX11 | 1.65 |
| 341 | 12 | "Undergrounded" | Greg Colton | Mike Desilets | February 23, 2020 | JACX13 | 1.57 |
| 342 | 13 | "Rich Old Stewie" | Brian Iles | Chris Sheridan | March 1, 2020 | JACX12 | 1.55 |
| 343 | 14 | "The Movement" | Joe Vaux | Maggie Mull | March 8, 2020 | JACX15 | 1.45 |
| 344 | 15 | "Baby Stewie" | Jerry Langford | Artie Johann | March 15, 2020 | JACX14 | 1.68 |
| 345 | 16 | "Start Me Up" | John Holmquist | Daniel Peck | April 19, 2020 | JACX16 | 1.58 |
| 346 | 17 | "Coma Guy" | Steve Robertson | Patrick Meighan | April 26, 2020 | JACX07 | 1.54 |
| 347 | 18 | "Better Off Meg" | Anthony Agrusa | Emily Towers | May 3, 2020 | JACX17 | 1.39 |
| 348 | 19 | "Holly Bibble" | Julius Wu | Cherry Chevapravatdumrong | May 10, 2020 | JACX01 | 1.29 |
| 349 | 20 | "Movin' In (Principal Shepherd's Song)" | Joseph Lee | Danny Smith | May 17, 2020 | JACX18 | 1.51 |

=== Season 19 (2020–21) ===
| No. overall | No. in season | Title | Directed by | Written by | Original release date | Prod. code | U.S. viewers (millions) |
|---|---|---|---|---|---|---|---|
| 350 | 1 | "Stewie's First Word" | Mike Kim | Patrick Meighan | September 27, 2020 | JACX19 | 1.86 |
| 351 | 2 | "The Talented Mr. Stewie" | Greg Colton | Gary Janetti | October 4, 2020 | JACX20 | 1.36 |
| 352 | 3 | "Boys & Squirrels" | Joe Vaux | Steve Callaghan | October 11, 2020 | KACX02 | 1.48 |
| 353 | 4 | "Cutawayland" | Brian Iles | Patrick Meighan | November 1, 2020 (Note: This episode was originally scheduled to air on October 18, 2020, in the United States but was preempted as a result of the 2020 National League Championship Series running overtime. The episode still aired on its originally scheduled air date in Canada on Citytv.) | KACX01 | 1.83 |
| 354 | 5 | "La Famiglia Guy" | John Holmquist | Alex Carter | November 8, 2020 | KACX03 | 1.52 |
| 355 | 6 | "Meg's Wedding" | Steve Robertson | Mike Desilets | November 15, 2020 | KACX05 | 1.79 |
| 356 | 7 | "Wild Wild West" | Jerry Langford | Kirker Butler | November 22, 2020 | KACX08 | 1.68 |
| 357 | 8 | "Pawtucket Pat" | Julius Wu | Alex Carter | December 6, 2020 | KACX07 | 1.43 |
| 358 | 9 | "The First No L" | Joseph Lee | Damien Fahey | December 13, 2020 | KACX06 | 1.84 |
| 359 | 10 | "Fecal Matters" | Mike Kim & Dominic Bianchi | Artie Johann | January 17, 2021 | JACX09 | 3.22 |
| 360 | 11 | "Boy's Best Friend" | Mike Kim | Steve Callaghan | February 21, 2021 (Note: This episode was originally scheduled to air on February 14, 2021, in the United States but was preempted due to rain delays during the 2021 Daytona 500, which prompted new episodes meant to air that night to be shown next Sunday night.) | KACX09 | 1.31 |
| 361 | 12 | "And Then There's Fraud" | Brian Iles | Kevin Biggins | February 28, 2021 | KACX10 | 1.45 |
| 362 | 13 | "PeTerminator" | Joe Vaux | Mark Hentemann | March 7, 2021 | KACX12 | 1.15 |
| 363 | 14 | "The Marrying Kind" | Greg Colton | Travis Bowe | March 14, 2021 | KACX11 | 1.35 |
| 364 | 15 | "Customer of the Week" | John Holmquist | Artie Johann | March 28, 2021 | KACX13 | 1.26 |
| 365 | 16 | "Who's Brian Now?" | Steve Robertson | Maggie Mull | April 11, 2021 | KACX14 | 1.35 |
| 366 | 17 | "Young Parent Trap" | Jerry Langford | Emily Towers | April 18, 2021 | KACX15 | 1.21 |
| 367 | 18 | "Meg Goes to College" | Joseph Lee | Mike Desilets | May 2, 2021 | KACX16 | 1.14 |
| 368 | 19 | "Family Cat" | Julius Wu | Artie Johann | May 9, 2021 | KACX17 | 1.34 |
| 369 | 20 | "Tales of Former Sports Glory" | Joe Vaux & Peter Shin | Mark Hentemann | May 16, 2021 | KACX04 | 1.16 |

=== Season 20 (2021–22) ===
| No. overall | No. in season | Title | Directed by | Written by | Original release date | Prod. code | U.S. viewers (millions) |
|---|---|---|---|---|---|---|---|
| 370 | 1 | "LASIK Instinct" | Steve Robertson | Kirker Butler | September 26, 2021 | LACX02 | 1.56 |
| 371 | 2 | "Rock Hard" | Greg Colton | Matt McElaney | October 3, 2021 | KACX20 | 1.28 |
| 372 | 3 | "Must Love Dogs" | Mike Kim | Daniel Peck | October 10, 2021 | KACX18 | 1.67 |
| 373 | 4 | "80's Guy" | John Holmquist | Patrick Meighan | October 17, 2021 | LACX01 | 1.37 |
| 374 | 5 | "Brief Encounter" | Brian Iles | Travis Bowe | October 24, 2021 | KACX19 | 1.38 |
| 375 | 6 | "Cootie & The Blowhard" | Jerry Langford | Maggie Mull | November 7, 2021 | LACX03 | 1.57 |
| 376 | 7 | "Peterschmidt Manor" | Joseph Lee | Matt Pabian | November 14, 2021 | LACX04 | 1.11 |
| 377 | 8 | "The Birthday Bootlegger" | Julius Wu | Mark Hentemann | November 21, 2021 | LACX05 | 1.68 |
| 378 | 9 | "The Fatman Always Rings Twice" | Joe Vaux | Alex Carter | November 28, 2021 | LACX06 | 1.45 |
| 379 | 10 | "Christmas Crime" | Mike Kim | Steve Callaghan | December 19, 2021 | LACX07 | 1.53 |
| 380 | 11 | "Mister Act" | Brian Iles | Artie Johann | January 9, 2022 | LACX08 | 1.39 |
| 381 | 12 | "The Lois Quagmire" | Greg Colton | Evan Waite | February 27, 2022 | LACX09 | 1.26 |
| 382 | 13 | "Lawyer Guy" | John Holmquist | Patrick Meighan | March 6, 2022 | LACX10 | 1.31 |
| 383 | 14 | "HBO-No" | Steve Robertson | Travis Bowe | March 13, 2022 | LACX11 | 1.03 |
| 384 | 15 | "Hard Boiled Meg" | Jerry Langford | Mike Desilets | March 20, 2022 | LACX12 | 1.14 |
| 385 | 16 | "Prescription Heroine" | Joseph Lee | Emily Towers | March 27, 2022 | LACX13 | 1.13 |
| 386 | 17 | "All About Alana" | Joe Vaux | Danny Smith | May 1, 2022 | LACX15 | 1.05 |
| 387 | 18 | "Girlfriend, Eh?" | Julius Wu | Travis Bowe | May 8, 2022 | LACX14 | 1.11 |
| 388 | 19 | "First Blood" | Mike Kim | Alex Carter | May 15, 2022 | LACX16 | 1.09 |
| 389 | 20 | "The Jersey Bore" | Brian Iles | Chris Regan | May 22, 2022 | LACX17 | 1.13 |

=== Season 21 (2022–23) ===
| No. overall | No. in season | Title | Directed by | Written by | Original release date | Prod. code | U.S. viewers (millions) |
|---|---|---|---|---|---|---|---|
| 390 | 1 | "Oscars Guy" | Greg Colton | Damien Fahey | September 25, 2022 | LACX18 | 1.57 |
| 391 | 2 | "Bend or Blockbuster" | John Holmquist | Artie Johann | October 2, 2022 | LACX19 | 1.12 |
| 392 | 3 | "A Wife-Changing Experience" | Steve Robertson | Steve Callaghan | October 9, 2022 | LACX20 | 1.49 |
| 393 | 4 | "The Munchurian Candidate" | Joe Vaux | Mike Desilets | October 16, 2022 | MACX05 | 1.01 |
| 394 | 5 | "Unzipped Code" | Julius Wu | Matt McElaney & Matt Pabian | October 23, 2022 | MACX06 | 1.42 |
| 395 | 6 | "Happy Holo-ween" | Joseph Lee | Evan Waite | October 30, 2022 | MACX03 | 1.53 |
| 396 | 7 | "The Stewaway" | Mike Kim | Travis Bowe | November 13, 2022 | MACX07 | 1.58 |
| 397 | 8 | "Get Stewie" | Jerry Langford | Artie Johann | November 20, 2022 | MACX01 | 1.19 |
| 398 | 9 | "Carny Knowledge" | Brian Iles | Steve Callaghan | December 4, 2022 | MACX04 | 1.04 |
| 399 | 10 | "The Candidate" | John Holmquist | Mark Hentemann | December 11, 2022 | MACX08 | 1.44 |
| 400 | 11 | "Love Story Guy" | Steve Robertson | Patrick Meighan | January 8, 2023 | MACX02 | 1.24 |
| 401 | 12 | "Old West" | Greg Colton | Artie Johann | February 19, 2023 | MACX10 | 1.07 |
| 402 | 13 | "Single White Dad" | Jerry Langford | Artie Johann | February 26, 2023 | MACX11 | 0.94 |
| 403 | 14 | "White Meg Can't Jump" | Joe Vaux | Emily Towers | March 5, 2023 | MACX09 | 0.85 |
| 404 | 15 | "Adoptation" | Julius Wu | Mark Hentemann | March 12, 2023 | MACX13 | 1.05 |
| 405 | 16 | "The Bird Reich" | Joseph Lee | Julius Sharpe | April 16, 2023 | MACX12 | 0.86 |
| 406 | 17 | "A Bottle Episode" | Mike Kim | Artie Johann | April 16, 2023 | MACX14 | 0.92 |
| 407 | 18 | "Vat Man and Rob 'Em" | Brian Iles | Damien Fahey | April 23, 2023 | MACX15 | 0.90 |
| 408 | 19 | "From Russia with Love" | John Holmquist | Polina Diaz | April 30, 2023 | MACX16 | 0.94 |
| 409 | 20 | "Adult Education" | Steve Robertson | Matt Pabian | May 7, 2023 | MACX17 | 0.76 |

=== Season 22 (2023–24) ===
| No. overall | No. in season | Title | Directed by | Written by | Original release date | Prod. code | U.S. viewers (millions) |
|---|---|---|---|---|---|---|---|
| 410 | 1 | "Fertilized Megg" | Julius Wu | Maggie Mull | October 1, 2023 | NACX01 | 1.03 |
| 411 | 2 | "Supermarket Pete" | Greg Colton | Joanna Quraishi | October 8, 2023 | MACX18 | 0.86 |
| 412 | 3 | "A 'Stache from the Past" | Jerry Langford | Travis Bowe | October 22, 2023 | MACX19 | 0.76 |
| 413 | 4 | "Old World Harm" | Joe Vaux | Evan Waite | November 5, 2023 | MACX20 | 1.37 |
| 414 | 5 | "Baby, It's Cold Inside" | Joseph Lee | Danny Smith | November 12, 2023 | NACX02 | 1.20 |
| 415 | 6 | "Boston Stewie" | Mike Kim | Patrick Meighan | November 19, 2023 | NACX03 | 0.98 |
| 416 | 7 | "Snap(ple) Decision" | Brian Iles | Travis Bowe | November 26, 2023 | NACX04 | 0.88 |
| 417 | 8 | "Baking Sad" | John Holmquist | Damien Fahey | December 3, 2023 | NACX05 | 1.26 |
| 418 | 9 | "The Return of the King (of Queens)" | Greg Colton | Alex Carter | December 17, 2023 | NACX07 | 1.44 |
| 419 | 10 | "Cabin Pressure" | Jerry Langford | Matt McElaney | March 6, 2024 | NACX09 | 0.92 |
| 420 | 11 | "Teacher's Heavy Pet" | Steve Robertson | Chris Regan | March 13, 2024 | NACX06 | 0.77 |
| 421 | 12 | "Take This Job and Love It" | Joe Vaux | Steve Callaghan | March 20, 2024 | NACX08 | 0.72 |
| 422 | 13 | "Lifeguard Meg" | Julius Wu | Patrick Meighan | March 27, 2024 | NACX10 | 0.76 |
| 423 | 14 | "Fat Actor" | Joseph Lee | Mark Hentemann | April 10, 2024 | NACX11 | 0.78 |
| 424 | 15 | "Faith No More" | Mike Kim | Alex Carter | April 17, 2024 | NACX12 | 0.79 |

=== Season 23 (2024–25) ===
| No. overall | No. in season (Note: Episodes without an episode number within the season constitute exclusive episodes commissioned and released by Hulu.) | Title | Directed by | Written by | Original release date | Prod. code | U.S. viewers (millions) |
|---|---|---|---|---|---|---|---|
| 425 | – | "Peter, Peter, Pumpkin Cheater" | Joe Vaux | Travis Bowe | October 14, 2024 | NACX19 | N/A |
| 426 | – | "Gift of the White Guy" | Jerry Langford | Joanna Quraishi | November 25, 2024 | NACX20 | N/A |
| 427 | 1 | "Fat Gun" | Greg Colton | Artie Johann | February 16, 2025 | NACX16 | 1.44 |
| 428 | 2 | "Live, Laugh, Love" | Brian Iles | Mike Desilets | February 23, 2025 | NACX13 | 1.02 |
| 429 | 3 | "Drunk with Power" | John Holmquist | Julius Sharpe | March 2, 2025 | NACX14 | 0.72 |
| 430 | 4 | "Lois C.K." | Steve Robertson | Evan Waite | March 9, 2025 | NACX15 | 0.70 |
| 431 | 5 | "The Chicken or the Meg" | Julius Wu | Emily Towers | March 16, 2025 | NACX17 | 0.63 |
| 432 | 6 | "Dog is My Co-Pilot" | Joseph Lee | Steve Callaghan | March 23, 2025 | NACX18 | 0.69 |
| 433 | 7 | "Pitch Imperfect" | Mike Kim | Artie Johann | March 30, 2025 | PACX01 | 0.72 |
| 434 | 8 | "Hard Times at Adam West High" | Brian Iles | Steve Callaghan | April 6, 2025 | PACX02 | 0.75 |
| 435 | 9 | "The Elle Word" | John Holmquist | Alex Carter | April 13, 2025 | PACX03 | 0.68 |
| 436 | 10 | "A Real Who's Hulu" | Steve Robertson | Matt Pabian | April 27, 2025 | PACX04 | 0.71 |
| 437 | 11 | "China Doll" | Joe Vaux | Patrick Meighan | May 4, 2025 | PACX05 | 0.66 |
| 438 | 12 | "One Foot in Front of the Mother" | Greg Colton | Matt McElaney | May 11, 2025 | PACX06 | 0.78 |
| 439 | 13 | "The Fat Lotus" | Brian Iles | Steve Callaghan | May 18, 2025 | PACX11 | 0.67 |
| 440 | 14 | "Cool Hand Lois" | Jerry Langford | Maggie Mull | May 29, 2025 | PACX07 | 0.59 |
| 441 | 15 | "Martian Meg" | Joseph Lee | Matt Porter & Charlie Hankin | June 5, 2025 | PACX08 | 0.46 |
| 442 | 16 | "Row v. Wade" | Julius Wu | Mike Desilets | July 3, 2025 | PACX09 | 0.43 |
| 443 | 17 | "Karenheit 451" | Mike Kim | Evan Waite | July 10, 2025 | PACX10 | 0.57 |
| 444 | 18 | "Twain's World" | Steve Robertson | Julius Sharpe | July 17, 2025 | PACX13 | 0.51 |

=== Season 24 (2025–26) ===
| No. overall | No. in season | Title | Directed by | Written by | Original release date | Prod. code | U.S. viewers (millions) |
|---|---|---|---|---|---|---|---|
| 445 | – | "A Little Fright Music" | Mike Kim | Danny Smith | October 6, 2025 | PACX19 | N/A |
| 446 | – | "Disney's Hulu's Family Guy's Hallmark Channel's Lifetime's Familiar Holiday Movie" | Steve Robertson | Mark Hentemann | November 28, 2025 | PACX20 | N/A |
| 447 | 1 | "The Edible Arrangement" | John Holmquist | Travis Bowe | February 15, 2026 | PACX12 | 0.89 |
| 448 | 2 | "Pumpkin Spice Girls" | Joe Vaux | Polina Diaz | February 22, 2026 | PACX14 | 1.04 |
| 449 | 3 | "Man-Fest Destiny" | Greg Colton | Travis Bowe | February 22, 2026 | PACX15 | 0.84 |
| 450 | 4 | "Bringing Up Brady" | Jerry Langford | Chris Regan | March 1, 2026 | PACX16 | 1.05 |
| 451 | 5 | "Dear Francis" | Joseph Lee | Matt Porter & Charlie Hankin | March 1, 2026 | PACX17 | 0.75 |
| 452 | 6 | "Viewer DMs" | Julius Wu | Patrick Meighan | March 8, 2026 | PACX18 | 0.89 |
| 453 | 7 | "Scent of a Woman" | Brian Iles | Steve Callaghan | March 8, 2026 | RACX01 | 0.82 |
| 454 | 8 | "Play Time" | John Holmquist | Alex Carter | March 15, 2026 | RACX02 | 0.73 |
| 455 | 9 | "Phony Montana" | Joe Vaux | Mike Desilets | March 15, 2026 | RACX03 | 0.77 |
| 456 | 10 | "A Few More Ways to Die in the West" | Greg Colton | Jordan Ramp | April 12, 2026 | RACX04 | 0.71 |
| 457 | 11 | "Tall Stewie" | Jerry Langford | Hillman Hollister & Jack Stovitz | April 12, 2026 | RACX05 | 0.79 |
| 458 | 12 | "Lower G.I. Joe" | Joseph Lee | Damien Fahey | April 26, 2026 | RACX06 | 1.07 |
| 459 | 13 | "Friend's Best Man" | Julius Wu | Polina Diaz | May 3, 2026 | RACX07 | 0.65 |
| 460 | 14 | "Let the Goodtimes Walk" | Mike Kim | Matt McElaney | May 10, 2026 | RACX08 | 0.62 |
| 461 | 15 | "High School History" | Steve Robertson | Patrick Meighan | May 17, 2026 | RACX09 | 0.75 |

=== Season 25 (2026) ===
| No. overall | No. in season | Title | Directed by | Written by | Original release date | Prod. code | U.S. viewers (millions) |
|---|---|---|---|---|---|---|---|
| 462 | – | "Happy Hell-o-ween" | Joe Vaux | Travis Bowe | October 5, 2026 | RACX16 | N/A |
| 463 | – | "The Peter Clause" | TBA | Artie Johann | November 30, 2026 | RACX17 | N/A |

== Upcoming episodes without a scheduled premiere date ==
| Title | Directed by | Written by | Prod. code |
|---|---|---|---|
| "Young Carter" | TBA | Artie Johann | RACX10 |
| TBA | TBA | Abby Lavalley | RACX11 |
| TBA | TBA | Matt Porter & Charlie Hankin | RACX12 |
| "Kiss Cam Thank You Ma'am" | TBA | TBA | TBA |
| "Snow Way Out" | TBA | TBA | TBA |
| "Sherlock Holmes and...Something About a Vampire" | TBA | David A. Goodman | RACX13 |
| "The Gospel According to Brian" | TBA | Maggie Mull | RACX14 |
| "Free Peter" | TBA | Artie Johann | RACX15 |
| "Acts of Crime" | TBA | Alex Carter | SACX01 |
| "Rolling Back the Years" | TBA | Steve Callaghan | SACX02 |
| "No Country for Cold Men" | Joe Vaux | Maggie Mull | SACX03 |
| "Auto Erotica" | TBA | Polina Diaz | SACX04 |
| "Urban Legend" | TBA | Damien Fahey | SACX05 |
| "The Tell Tale Tail" | TBA | Mike Desilets | SACX06 |
| "Dog Resources" | TBA | Julius Sharpe | SACX07 |
| "Caricature Flaws" | TBA | TBA | SACX08 |
| "Meg Your Pardon" | TBA | TBA | SACX09 |
| "Mommy and Meat" | Joe Vaux | Matt Porter & Charlie Hankin | SACX10 |
| "Three Presidents" | TBA | TBA | SACX11 |
| "Brothers in Arms" | TBA | TBA | SACX12 |
| "Preston to Service" | TBA | TBA | SACX13 |
| "Hair Flub for Men" | TBA | TBA | SACX14 |
| "Now Streaming" | TBA | TBA | SACX15 |
| "Personal Growth" | TBA | TBA | SACX17 |

== Specials ==
| Title | Directed by | Written by | Original release date | Prod. code | U.S. viewers (millions) |
|---|---|---|---|---|---|
| "100th Episode Special" | Seth MacFarlane | Tom Devanney & Alec Sulkin & John Viener & Wellesley Wild | November 4, 2007 | 6ACX45 | 10.47 |
Seth MacFarlane hosts a special looking back at the most memorable episodes from the past 100 episodes of Family Guy.
| "Family Guy Presents: Seth & Alex's Almost Live Comedy Show" | Jackson Douglas & Louis J. Horvitz | Aaron Blitzstein & Alex Borstein & Cherry Chevapravatdumrong & Andrew Goldberg & Dave Ihlenfeld & Artie Johann & Seth MacFarlane & Patrick Meighan & Danny Smith & Alec Sulkin & John Viener & Wellesley Wild | November 8, 2009 | N/A | 6.73 |
Seth MacFarlane and Alex Borstein host a half-hour variety special.
| "200 Episodes Later" | Brad Lachman | Michael O'Rourke | November 11, 2012 | AACX45 | 5.06 |
Fans get a look behind the scenes at the most outrageous moments on Family Guy.

== See also ==
- List of Family Guy home video releases
