= Family Guy season 13 =

Season of television series

Family Guy
- Season 13
- DVD cover
- Showrunners: Steve Callaghan; Alec Sulkin
- Starring: Seth MacFarlane; Alex Borstein; Seth Green; Mila Kunis; Mike Henry
- No. of episodes: 18

Release
- Original network: Fox
- Original release: September 28, 2014 – May 17, 2015

Season chronology
- ← Previous; Season 12 Next → Season 14

The thirteenth season of Family Guy aired on Fox in the United States from September 28, 2014, to May 17, 2015.

The series follows the dysfunctional Griffin family, consisting of father Peter, mother Lois, daughter Meg, son Chris, baby Stewie and the family dog Brian, who reside in their hometown of Quahog.

The season begins with a 44 minute-long crossover with The Simpsons entitled "The Simpsons Guy". Guest stars throughout the season include Julie Bowen, Liam Neeson, Maya Rudolph, Chris Hardwick, Emily Osment, T.J. Miller, Lea Thompson, Allison Janney, Connie Britton, and Tony Sirico.

Also during this season, Joe writes a children's book ("The Book of Joe"), Peter and Lois open a cookie store ("Baking Bad"), Stewie becomes pregnant with Brian's baby ("Stewie Is Enceinte"), Meg becomes a foot fetish model ("This Little Piggy"), and Brian and Stewie take Chris back through time to help him with his history class, with the three ending in chaos on the Titanic ("Stewie, Chris, & Brian's Excellent Adventure"), There is also a Christmas episode with the return of Jesus, who claims that he has never had sex ("The 2000-Year-Old Virgin"), and Peter attempts to beat up guest star Liam Neeson ("Fighting Irish").

== Promotion ==
At San Diego Comic Con 2014, Fox released a trailer for the upcoming 44 minute crossover episode with The Simpsons, titled The Simpsons Guy.

== Voice cast and characters ==
- Seth MacFarlane as Peter Griffin, Brian Griffin, Stewie Griffin, Glenn Quagmire, Tom Tucker, Carter Pewterschmidt, Roger Smith, Dr. Hartman, Seamus Levine
- Alex Borstein as Lois Griffin, Babs Pewterschmidt, Tricia Takanawa
- Seth Green as Chris Griffin
- Mila Kunis as Meg Griffin
- Mike Henry as Cleveland Brown, John Herbert, Bruce, Consuela

=== Supporting characters ===
- Gary Cole as Principal Shepard
- Johnny Brennan as Mort Goldman
- Christine Lakin as Joyce Kinney
- Sanaa Lathan as Donna Tubbs-Brown
- Martha MacIsaac as Patty
- Christina Milian as Esther
- Emily Osment as Ruth, Various
- Kevin Michael Richardson as Jerome
- Jennifer Tilly as Bonnie Swanson
- Patrick Warburton as Joe Swanson
- Adam West as Mayor Adam West
- Rachael MacFarlane as Miss Tammy
- H. Jon Benjamin as Carl

=== Guest Star Characters ===
- Dan Castellaneta as Homer Simpson, Krusty the Clown, Barney Gumble, Grandpa Simpson, Mayor Quimby, Kodos, Hans Moleman, Squeaky Voice Teen, Groundskeeper Willie, Sideshow Mel, Lenny Leonard, Blue-Haired Lawyer
- Hank Azaria as Moe Szyslak, Apu Nahasapeemapetilon, Carl Carlson, Chief Wiggum, Comic Book Guy, Dr. Nick, Sea Captain, Professor Frink, Bumblebee Man, Lou
- Julie Kavner as Marge Simpson, Patty Bouvier, Selma Bouvier
- Nancy Cartwright as Bart Simpson, Ralph Wiggum, Nelson Muntz, Todd Flanders
- Yeardley Smith as Lisa Simpson

== Episodes ==
No. overall	No. in season	Title	Directed by	Written by	Original release date	Prod. code	U.S. viewers (millions)
232	1	"The Simpsons Guy"	Peter Shin	Patrick Meighan	September 28, 2014	BACX22	8.45
232	1	"The Simpsons Guy"	Peter Shin	Patrick Meighan	September 28, 2014	BACX23	8.45
In a crossover with The Simpsons, the Griffins meet the Simpsons when Peter makes a sexist comic, causing the Griffins to escape, but they end up in Springfield when their car is stolen. Stewie takes lessons in pranks and skateboarding from Bart, while Lisa discovers - to her annoyance - that Meg is as good at playing the saxophone as she is. Peter bonds with Homer as they locate the missing car, but then they fight after Peter loses his job when Pawtucket Patriot is revealed to be a copy of Duff Beer.
233	2	"The Book of Joe"	Mike Kim	Mike Desilets	October 5, 2014	CACX01	3.63
Peter helps Joe fulfill his dream of getting a children's book published, only to take over as the writer. Meanwhile, Brian becomes obsessed with exercising to impress a female marathon runner.
234	3	"Baking Bad"	Jerry Langford	Mark Hentemann	October 19, 2014	BACX20	4.74
After hearing that an earthquake struck Haiti, Lois and Peter decide to open a bakery and sell cookies, but their business partnership becomes strained when Peter changes the bakery into a strip club that sells cookies. Meanwhile, Stewie becomes addicted to cough medicine after Brian gives him some to help him sleep.
235	4	"Brian the Closer"	John Holmquist	Steve Marmel	November 9, 2014	BACX21	3.63
Brian becomes upset after getting his teeth knocked out by a fire hydrant, and Quagmire helps pay for Brian to get new teeth. With his new set of teeth, he gets a job as a real estate agent and tricks Quagmire into buying a badly conditioned condo.
236	5	"Turkey Guys"	Julius Wu	Cherry Chevapravatdumrong	November 16, 2014	CACX02	4.46
Peter becomes drunk and devours the turkey on the night before Thanksgiving and blaming Brian for participating, so he and Brian go out to find a new one at a zoo. Meanwhile, while Peter is gone, Chris believes he is now the man of the house.
237	6	"The 2000-Year-Old Virgin"	Joseph Lee	Ted Jessup	December 7, 2014	CACX03	4.44
When Peter finds Jesus at the mall, Jesus surprises him by saying that he has never had a sexual intercourse before, Determined to change the reveal, Peter enlists the help of his friends so Jesus can lose his virginity on his 2000th birthday.
238	7	"Stewie, Chris, & Brian's Excellent Adventure"	Joe Vaux	Alex Carter	January 4, 2015	CACX04	5.53
In order to help Chris pass ninth grade, Stewie and Brian invite Chris on a journey through time to help him pass a history test that is his only hope of finishing ninth grade, and the three end up stuck in 1912 aboard the Titanic.
239	8	"Our Idiot Brian"	John Holmquist	Aaron Lee	January 11, 2015	CACX05	4.12
After Brian tested poorly on Meg's SAT, he starts to realize he is not as smart as he thinks he is, prompting Peter to tell him how having low IQ can be good, until it’s revealed that Brian has a brain tumor.
240	9	"This Little Piggy"	Brian Iles	Kristin Long	January 25, 2015	CACX06	3.19
When Meg signs up for a modeling contract, she becomes skeptical when she realizes that her type of modeling is for foot fetishists. Meanwhile, Stewie decides to take a break from pre-school and live his life at a folk festival, much to Brian’s dismay.
241	10	"Quagmire's Mom"	Greg Colton	Tom Devanney	February 8, 2015	CACX07	2.81
Quagmire is arrested for statutory rape, and his born-again Christian mother Crystal returns to defend him. Meanwhile, Peter finds out what his real name is and changes his personality accordingly.
242	11	"Encyclopedia Griffin"	Jerry Langford	Lew Morton	February 15, 2015	CACX08	2.51
Peter and the guys decide to start their own detective agency and are surprised to find out Chris is a thief when they find a life sized mannequin in Chris’s closet, which leads Lois to become skeptical about him after he gets in a relationship with it, which he names the mannequin Heather, so Lois decides to steal it from him during the night.
243	12	"Stewie Is Enceinte"	Steve Robertson	Gary Janetti	March 8, 2015	CACX09	3.98
After Brian decides he does not want to be around Stewie anymore, Stewie then tries to save their friendship by impregnating himself with Brian's DNA samples, which results with a litter of dog/human hybrids and starts to become a problem, Meanwhile, Peter and the guys try to make an attempt to make a viral internet video at the Clam, but doesn’t go well.
244	13	"Dr. C and the Women"	Mike Kim	Travis Bowe	March 15, 2015	CACX10	3.45
Cleveland obtains a new job as a therapist, and gives Peter and Lois relationship advice. Peter soon grows frustrated and threatens to reveal a secret to Donna about the events of Cleveland's bachelor party. Meanwhile, Meg becomes popular at her new job at the local airport due to being the most attractive worker.
245	14	"#JOLO"	Julius Wu	Artie Johann & Shawn Ries	April 12, 2015	CACX11	3.11
When Peter accidentally discovers a missing child while climbing on a billboard, he is hailed as the town’s hero. Meanwhile, Joe quits his job and heads to Niagara Falls to live life to the fullest, until Peter, Cleveland, and Quagmire get stuck in a river and almost fall into a waterfall where Joe saves them from death.
246	15	"Once Bitten"	Joseph Lee	Anthony Blasucci	April 19, 2015	CACX12	3.30
Brian becomes more submissive after attending obedience school as a punishment for biting Peter in the arm while having to take medication. Meanwhile, Chris befriends Neil Goldman and realizes that he is using him to get close to Meg, much to his dismay.
247	16	"Roasted Guy"	Joe Vaux	Andrew Goldberg	April 26, 2015	CACX13	3.17
Peter makes his friends throw him a Dean Martin-style comedy roast, but when he feels humiliated by the roasts, he decides to find new friends with a group of gossiping women who offend Lois behind her back.
248	17	"Fighting Irish"	Brian Iles	Jaydi Samuels	May 3, 2015	CACX15	3.68
Peter claims that he could defeat Liam Neeson in a fight, but his skills are put to the test when Neeson himself actually shows up, bails him out of jail after Peter gets arrested for foolishly confessing his intentions to two security guards, and makes Peter his errand boy. Meanwhile, Stewie is annoyed with Lois when she becomes a class mother and starts paying more attention to other children instead of Stewie.
249	18	"Take My Wife"	John Holmquist	Kevin Biggins	May 17, 2015	CACX14	2.85
Lois books a vacation for her and Peter in the Bahamas, but when they arrive, Peter realized that the vacation is actually a marriage counseling program. Meanwhile, Carter babysits the children and tries to teach them how to have fun without TV and electronics.
