= This Little Piggy (Family Guy) =

- Family Guy episode
- Episode no.: Season 13; Episode 9
- Directed by: Brian Iles
- Written by: Kristin Long
- Original air date: January 25, 2015

Episode chronology
← Previous "Our Idiot Brian"	Next → "Quagmire's Mom"
- Family Guy season 13

"This Little Piggy" is the ninth episode of the 13th season of the animated sitcom Family Guy, and the 240th episode overall. It aired on Fox in the United States on January 25, 2015, and was written by Kristin Long and directed by Brian Iles. In the episode, Meg becomes a foot fetish model. Meanwhile, Stewie decides to experience the world beyond daycare.

== Plot ==
During a "graduation" at Stewie's preschool, Brian belittles his achievements while a photographer named Evan offers Meg a modeling job; from her parents' disbelief, Peter rips his own ears off. At the end of the shoot, she is surprised to discover that her modeling is solely for foot fetish pornography. She returns home to her still-skeptical parents Peter and Lois, and brags about her potential. However, she is still unsure of herself until she is shown that she really is a success.

Meanwhile, Stewie realizes his "graduation" is not a real achievement and decides to take a year off from school to see the world. They stop at the Rhode Island Folk Festival where Stewie disguises himself to appear older. He tries to settle in without luck and takes his act overboard.

Back at home, Chris searches for online pornography after finishing his homework, and finds Meg's feet. After implying masturbation to the photos, he tells Peter and Lois while showing them the pictures, and they confront her when she starts to leave. They demand she stop modeling but she stands up to them for underestimating her and walks out to go to a party. Lois is determined to find Meg and get her away from her party.

Later, Stewie and Brian fall for the same hippie girl named Cassandra. Even though they temporarily agree to get along together with her, they soon begin to set out to destroy each other's chances. Despite this, they discover she is open to a three-way, but after she leads them to her tent, she overdoses on cocaine and dies. They take her to a nearby cliff to dump her body where she lands on a pile of other bodies of overdose victims. Before rolling her body down, Stewie takes her bra off in exchange for the $40 he never got paid back for.

Peter and Lois go to Quagmire's house to get a lead on the party, and discover that 50 men will do sexual acts with Meg's foot. Arriving, they stop her by apologizing for the way they treat her. When they start to leave, the 50 men stop them and state they were promised a foot. To keep the group happy, Peter and Lois use Joe's foot while distracting him by making him watch Tower Heist on a tablet and not telling him what they need his foot for.

Stewie returns to school satisfied with his experience in the real world. Peter answers the door, and Joe tells him that he thinks his foot somehow became pregnant while he was watching Tower Heist.

== Production ==
In an interview for Entertainment Weekly promoting the thirteenth season, executive producer Steve Callaghan said that in the episode Stewie would "realize that his life is passing him by and he deserves to take a gap year...So he and Brian end up at a Coachella-type music festival, where Stewie hopes to find his true self."

== Reception ==
The episode received an audience of 3.19 million, making it the second most watched show on Fox that night after The Simpsons episode "The Musk Who Fell to Earth".

Narsimha Chintaluri of TV Fanatic gave the episode 3.8/5 stars.
