= Fighting Irish (Family Guy) =

- Family Guy episode
- Promotional image
- Episode no.: Season 13; Episode 17
- Directed by: Brian Iles
- Written by: Jaydi Samuels
- Production code: CACX15
- Original air date: May 3, 2015

Guest appearance
- Liam Neeson as himself

Episode chronology
← Previous "Roasted Guy"	Next → "Take My Wife"
- Family Guy season 13

"Fighting Irish" is the seventeenth episode of the thirteenth season of the animated sitcom Family Guy, and the 248th episode overall but it is advertised as the 250th episode. It aired on Fox in the United States on May 3, 2015, and is written by Jaydi Samuels and directed by Brian Iles.

In the episode, Peter's friends grow tired of his drunken boasts that he can beat up Irish actor and former amateur boxing champion Liam Neeson; when Neeson finds out, he promises not to beat up Peter if he becomes his personal servant. Meanwhile, Stewie becomes jealous of the attention Lois gives to another boy.

== Plot ==
Glenn Quagmire holds his Quagfest to celebrate his 1,000th sexual conquest, which turns out to be with a largemouth bass. After Peter learns that Irish actor Liam Neeson is making a film about a vengeance-seeking Albert Einstein in Waterbury, Connecticut, his repeated drunken boasts about how he can beat Neeson in a fight exhaust the patience of Quagmire, Joe, and Cleveland, who decide to arrange for Peter to prove himself in a battle against Neeson. Peter tries various ways to meet Neeson. His first attempt was to dress as Mrs. Potato Head to lure him out – only to attract Colin Farrell. Then he sets up a fake confession booth, which draws Neeson, who confesses to killing hundreds of wolves and stealing items from 7-Eleven. When Peter states his reason for being there to security, he is arrested. While his friends work to raise his bail money, he is bailed out by Neeson, who is appalled by Peter boasting he can beat him up. Peter hits Neeson with a metal food tray, only to have the tray dented and Neeson uninjured. Before Neeson can take a punch at him, a flinching Peter offers him his services, to which Neeson agrees.

Meanwhile, Lois volunteers to be a class mother at Stewie's preschool, much to his chagrin, and becomes jealous when she pays attention to another infant, Landon. He tries various ways to get the better of Landon, such as making him swallow a whole grape and seducing his mother, which both fail. Stewie eventually reaches his breaking point and breaks down in tears, confessing his envy to Lois, who tells him he shall always be her little baby, to which Stewie is relieved to hear and rubs it in Landon's face.

The tasks Neeson has Peter do are eccentric and humiliating, such as pretending to be him on jury duty to get out of a case against the Kraken from Clash of the Titans, asking showering people to urinate in his hands, and updating Neeson's Twitter account. When Peter returns to his friends, he claims he did defeat Neeson. When Neeson texts him for another favor, he returns to Connecticut, and before Peter can do the favor, his friends arrive and Peter admits his lie. When Neeson once again asks Peter for the hand urination favor, Peter finally rebels - causing Neeson to smack him; they brawl, and Neeson wins easily. Despite losing, Quagmire, Cleveland, and Joe are amazed that Peter went through with the battle and impressed he wasn't killed. Peter then cheerfully says that the lesson of this entire saga was that "Oskar Schindler wasn't real, and neither was anything else in that movie", though Quagmire looks uncomfortable and says he doesn't think that was the lesson.

== Production ==
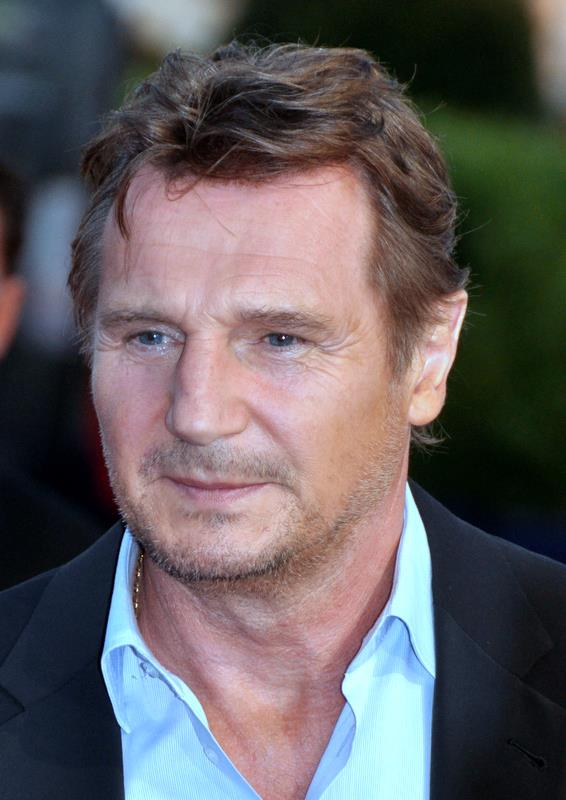
Liam Neeson voiced himself in the episode.

The episode was written by Jaydi Samuels, who started out in 2008 as a production assistant on Family Guy. The show's writers were excited after Neeson agreed to say any line that they wrote except, "I’ve been a world-famous tough guy since 56", which he altered on the basis that he was 55 when he filmed Taken.

In an interview with Entertainment Weekly ahead of the thirteenth season, Family Guy executive producer Steve Callaghan told reporter Dan Snierson of Neeson's performance in the episode "This ranks up there with Taken. Maybe not Taken 2, but definitely Taken".

Neeson had previously been parodied in the episode "Prick Up Your Ears", in which John Viener played him in a joke mocking his attempts at an American accent. He also had a cameo role as himself in the twelfth season episode "Brian's a Bad Father".

== Reception ==
The episode was watched by 3.71 million people, making it the least viewed show in its timeslot, but the most watched show on Fox that night.

Writing for IGN, Jesse Schedeen called the episode a "pretty standard, mediocre installment of Family Guy", troubled by too many cutaways and random pop culture references. However, he said that it was improved by Neeson, who "reveled in the chance to poke fun at his stardom".
