= The 2000-Year-Old Virgin =

- Family Guy episode
- Episode no.: Season 13; Episode 6
- Directed by: Joseph Lee
- Written by: Ted Jessup
- Production code: CACX03
- Original air date: December 7, 2014

Guest appearances
- Jeff Garlin as himself; Ana Gasteyer as Speed Dater; Lucas Grabeel; Emily Osment as Girl in Santa Hat/Carrie Underwood; Uncredited: Kevin Michael Richardson as Black Mall Santa

Episode chronology
← Previous "Turkey Guys"	Next → "Stewie, Chris, & Brian's Excellent Adventure"
- Family Guy season 13

"The 2000-Year-Old Virgin" is the sixth episode of the thirteenth season of the animated sitcom Family Guy, and the 237th episode overall. It aired on Fox in the United States on December 7, 2014, and is written by Ted Jessup and directed by Joseph Lee. The title is a play on the film The 40-Year-Old Virgin and the skit 2000 Year Old Man.

In the episode, Peter lets Jesus have sex with his wife Lois after Jesus repeats his annual tradition of lying to a friend that he is still a virgin.

== Plot ==
On a trip to the Quahog Mall before Christmas, Peter and Lois bump into Jesus and discover that he is still hanging around Quahog due to not being entirely comfortable dealing with his own home life with God. Jesus invites Peter over to his place. However, since it is a depressing bachelor apartment, Peter takes him out for drinks with Quagmire, Cleveland, and Joe at the Drunken Clam. They start planning a birthday party for Jesus, and Jesus tells them that he has never had sex: to make his birthday special, they promise to help him lose his virginity. Their attempts to achieve this through speed dating fail, upsetting Peter. Lois tries to find out what Jesus likes, but her nice manners cause him to want to sleep with her. Approaching Peter about his issue to help him, Peter is shocked but agrees to help when Jesus promises him an expensive massage chair in return for sleeping with Lois. He lets Lois know about Jesus' interest in her and she reluctantly agrees.

As Lois and Jesus head out to a hotel together, Peter enjoys his chair at the Drunken Clam, but has a fantasy of them having sex and has second thoughts. Other people at the bar confirm to Peter that Jesus is not a virgin, but pulls this annual stunt every Christmas by bribing men with gifts just so he can sleep with their wives. An enraged Peter rushes to the hotel to stop the liaison, only to find that no cheating took place as Lois decided that their marriage is too good. Jesus applauds them for learning their "lesson" that he intended, nervously claiming that he concocted this charade as a tale of resisting temptation, before fleeing.

On Christmas Day, Rupert gives Stewie a Joni Mitchell CD for Christmas, disappointing him because Stewie had observed Rupert picking out a heart-shaped necklace. As Stewie tearfully listens to "Both Sides, Now" on the CD, he wonders whom the necklace was for, and it is revealed to be for Mayor Adam West.

== Reception ==
The episode received an audience of 4.44 million, making it the second most watched show on Fox that night after The Simpsons episode "I Won't Be Home for Christmas". In an interview ahead of the start of the thirteenth season, Family Guy executive producer Steve Callaghan said, when asked in an interview with Entertainment Weekly whether the episode would provoke a negative backlash, "We have a joke that addresses that exact point, that we're probably going to irritate some people with that episode."
