= Take My Wife (Family Guy) =

- Family Guy episode
- Episode no.: Season 13; Episode 18
- Directed by: John Holmquist
- Written by: Kevin Biggins
- Production code: CACX14
- Original air date: May 17, 2015

Guest appearance
- Mae Whitman as Kimi

Episode chronology
← Previous "Fighting Irish"	Next → "Pilling Them Softly"
- Family Guy season 13

"Take My Wife" is the nineteenth episode and season finale of the thirteenth season of the animated sitcom Family Guy, and the 249th episode overall. It aired on Fox in the United States on May 17, 2015, and is written by Kevin Biggins and directed by John Holmquist.

In the episode, Lois books a vacation for her and Peter in the Bahamas, but when they arrive, Peter learns it is actually a marriage counseling program. Meanwhile, Carter watches the Griffin children, but becomes frustrated that all of them simply want to use electronics instead of playing games the old-fashioned way.

== Plot ==
Peter, Quagmire, Cleveland, and Joe are playing poker in Peter's basement when Lois, Donna, and Bonnie inform them that they have booked a couples-only vacation to the Bahamas, although Quagmire discovers that this leaves him out. To watch the kids, Lois arranges for her father Carter to stay at their home. On departure day, Quagmire shows up with his new girlfriend Kimi, whom he met online, and Lois allows them to come. Upon arriving, they settle in, but discover that the resort is actually a relationship counseling retreat. The men are upset at being tricked and only participate halfheartedly. Noel, the counselor, determines that the couples are poorly matched and decides to change them to new pairings like Peter, Kimi, Lois, Cleveland, Joe, Donna, Quagmire and Bonnie. This experiment actually works out well for the most part, although some partners get jealous, particularly Lois over Kimi's pairing with Peter.

Meanwhile, the kids are all occupied with their electronic devices and ignore Carter, who takes away their devices and insists on showing them how to have fun the old-fashioned way. He tries to take them swimming, play jacks and exercise, but they are not receptive to the idea. Carter then teaches them pranks, which go well, and they soon adjust to playing the old way.

Displeased with Peter and Kimi's pairing, Lois threatens to leave, considering the counseling trip as a mistake. Just then, a Bahamian rebellion breaks out and Noel is killed sending the couples running, with Peter accidentally shooting down a passing plane with a flare gun when he tries to signal it for help. After that failed, the group flees into the jungle to avoid the rebel Bahamians while trying to make it to a landing strip on the other side of the island. Eventually, they are all captured in various ways like Kimi's phone giving her and Peter away, Quagmire shouting while urinating, and Cleveland stopping to scratch his back on the trees. When Quagmire tries to reason with the Bahamian rebels, the lead rebel states that they have gotten tired of the American tourists and him getting tired of being asked if he's the guy from Captain Phillips. The group is then threatened with execution as they discover they are not as compatible as they believed. They are led out two-by-two with sacks over their heads as gunshots are heard. As Peter and Lois are the last ones left, they admit their love for each other as they are led out and gunshots are heard again. Upon the sacks being removed from their heads, Peter and Lois suddenly find out that it was all staged by Noel (who faked his death) to help couples find their true love. Everything is alright until Noel learned from Peter about how he accidentally shot down a passing plane while trying to get help.

Carter declares that it is Dyngus Day and the Griffin children must find a girl and tap her with a branch. Peter and Lois return from their trip and turn on the TV. The kids resist the lure of the television only momentarily before they are hooked again upon watching a show called "Police Chases That End in Fire". The Griffin Family then continues watching "Police Chases That End in Fire" as Carter leaves their house.

== Production and cultural references ==
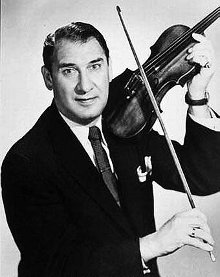
The title of the episode was derived from Henny Youngman's famous joke "Take my wife, please"

The episode was written by John Biggins and directed by John Holmquist. Richard Appel, Steve Callaghan, Danny Smith, and Seth MacFarlane served as executive producers. Dominic Bianchi and James Purdum served as supervising directors. Mae Whitman guest starred as Quagmires girlfriend Kimi.

The episode includes numerous cultural references. The title of the episode is derived from the joke "Take my wife, please," associated with Borscht Belt comedian Henny Youngman. The leader of the staged rebels complains about being mistaken for the "Captain Phillips guy," referring to Somali pirate Abduwali Muse, documented in the film Captain Phillips based on the novel A Captain's Duty.

== Reception ==
"Take My Wife" originally aired on Fox in the United States on May 17, 2015, followed by The Simpsons episode "Mathlete's Feat" and the Bob's Burgers episodes "Hawk & Chick" and "The Oeder Games". In its original broadcast, the episode finished 31st for the week of May 11–17, 2015 with a Nielsen rating of 2.85 million viewers. It was the most watched show on Fox that night, beating The Simpsons and Bob's Burgers.

Jesse Schedeen of IGN gave the episode a 4.7 out of 10, saying "Take My Wife" was a fitting finale to Family Guy's latest season only in the sense that it's indicative of the show's overall quality. "Family Guy isn't in a solid place right now, what between the unlikable characters, the focus on empty shock humor, and the conflicts that simply rehash what we've seen in the past. There was some entertainment to be had in this episode, but not nearly enough."
