= Stewie, Chris, & Brian's Excellent Adventure =

- Family Guy episode
- Episode no.: Season 13; Episode 7
- Directed by: Joe Vaux
- Written by: Alex Carter
- Original air date: January 4, 2015

Guest appearances
- Hank Azaria as Nigel Harpington; Tony Sirico as himself (Live-action sequence)

Episode chronology
← Previous "The 2000-Year-Old Virgin"	Next → "Our Idiot Brian"
- Family Guy season 13

"Stewie, Chris, & Brian's Excellent Adventure" is the seventh episode of the thirteenth season of the animated sitcom Family Guy, and the 238th episode overall. It aired on Fox in the United States on January 4, 2015, and is written by Alex Carter and directed by Joe Vaux.

In the episode, Stewie and Brian take Chris back in time so he can perform well in a history exam. The title is a play on the time travel film Bill & Ted's Excellent Adventure.

== Plot ==
Chris Griffin gives his parents Peter and Lois a note stating that Principal Shepherd wants to speak with them. At school, Principal Shepherd tells Peter and Lois that Chris is at a "D−" average and will have to repeat the 9th grade unless he passes his history class finals overseen by Mr. Harpington. Peter tries to coach him through to no avail. With Chris left to his own devices, Stewie and Brian quiz him and realize he needs extreme help. Stewie decides to take him for a tour of history in the time machine. Stewie doesn't want Chris to know about the time machine, so he and Brian sneak into his room and convince him that he's dreaming with consequences and take off for the past.

Stopping off in 1803 at one of the locations on Chris' history final, they observe U.S. President Thomas Jefferson trying to convince the U.S. Congress to approve the Louisiana Purchase. In Paris during 1920, they meet Ernest Hemingway who is in good spirits until Brian's prattle drives him to suicide (though Brian does manage to get his pen). Brian and Stewie then take Chris to Brazil before the invention of the soccer ball, Australia before the invention of the shark-tooth necklace (both similar in that the citizens stand around and do hardly anything) and Italy before the invention of pasta where stereotypical Italians are seen bashing rocks against other rocks and exclaiming stereotypical "vowel sounds"; Stewie calls the Italians ridiculous people, transitioning into a live-action sequence where Tony Sirico, angered at the Italian insult, reprimands Stewie about it. Then they visit 1944 on D-Day where they witness "Double D-Day" as big-breasted females in bikinis cause the Germans to stop shooting while the Warrant song "Cherry Pie" plays. They visit 1776 during George Washington's crossing of the Delaware River where George Washington is wearing arm floaties. The boys stop to visit Jane Austen to release their time-travel farts. While there, they find that she is attracted to the farts which help inspire her to write Pride & Prejudice. Arriving in the 1990s, Stewie, Brian, and Chris witness a man dancing to Go West's "King of Wishful Thinking". During the time travel, Brian takes a detour to kill Ivan Pavlov for his experiments on dogs. After an unseen visit to the British Parliament, Stewie gives money to a young Adolf Hitler (whom he mistakes for a young Charlie Chaplin). When they find Chris has learned nothing from the trip for his history test, Stewie calls Chris a moron. Hurt, Chris declares that he will win that bowling tournament with or without Stewie and boards the RMS Titanic with Stewie's return pad, leaving them to board the ship to stop him.

Barely catching a mooring rope, they climb aboard to split up to search for Chris; Stewie tells Brian to go down to the steerage and wade through the "gross Irish and Italians", leading the live-action Sirico to reprimand Stewie a second time. Brian searches the lower parts of the deck containing Irish Peter Griffin look-a-likes and makes his way to the ball room where he finds Stewie dining at the Captain's Table with Captain Edward Smith. The two of them then find Chris at another table and convince him to return. Chris wants to know why they cannot avoid the disaster as Stewie tries to make up an excuse about not altering the past. Before Stewie, Brian, and Chris can return to the present, the ship strikes the iceberg and the return pad is damaged by the rushing water. They find they need to get it to dry land to repair it. Dressing as women, they head for the lifeboats, but find they are too late. This causes Chris to force room for them all in the last boat by throwing a crew member overboard where he is unable to swim. Stewie apologizes to his brother for calling him a moron and compliments his physical strength.

Repairing the return pad and returning to the present, Chris finally comes out of his time-travel dream and wakes up still unprepared for his history test, believing that he was on a fancy boat called the Gigantic. While going on the computer to look up the fatalities of the Titanic, Brian and Stewie find out that the crew member Chris had thrown overboard was a man named Nigel Harpington, who was the ancestor of Chris' history teacher, Mr. Harpington. Therefore, Chris' history teacher was never born and he has a new one in the form of a hippie who goes by "Teacher Doug" and claims that he does not believe in tests, to Chris' relief. Superimposed words then appear stating "All history facts in this episode were gathered by quick glances at Wikipedia. To learn more about history, check out Yahoo! Answers."

== Production ==
In an interview ahead of the start of the season, Family Guy executive producer Steve Callaghan told Entertainment Weekly “I don’t want to spoil the episode too much, but I can say this: Toward the end of the second act, Chris ends up separating himself from Stewie and Brian, and ends up boarding the Titanic.”

== Reception ==
The episode received an audience of 5.53 million, making it the third-most watched show on Fox that night after The Simpsons episode "The Man Who Came to Be Dinner" and Brooklyn Nine-Nine.

Orrin Konheim of TV Fanatic gave the episode 4/5 stars.
