= Joe Vaux =

American animator and artist (born 1972)

Joseph S. Vaux (born 1972, in Islip, New York) is an American animator and artist who works as a storyboard artist and animation director on Family Guy. Vaux created the artwork for the character Goliath on the TV series Resident Alien. He lives in Culver City, California.

== Family Guy episodes ==
Joe Vaux has directed the following episodes:

- "Mr. and Mrs. Stewie"
- "Lois Comes Out of Her Shell"
- "Turban Cowboy"
- "A Fistful of Meg" (also co-written with Dominic Bianchi)
- "Grimm Job"
- "Chap Stewie"
- "Stewie, Chris, and Brian's Excellent Adventure"
- "Roasted Guy"
- "Peter, Chris, & Brian"
- "A Lot Going on Upstairs"
- "Inside Family Guy"
- "Peter's Def Jam"
- "Three Directors"
- "Send in Stewie, Please"
- "Big Trouble in Little Quahog"
- "Trump Guy"
- "Girl, Internetted"
- "Peter & Lois' Wedding"
- "Boys & Squirrels"
- "The Fatman Always Rings Twice"
