= The Book of Joe =

- Family Guy episode
- Episode no.: Season 13; Episode 2
- Directed by: Mike Kim
- Written by: Mike Desilets
- Production code: CACX01
- Original air date: October 5, 2014

Guest appearances
- Mason Cook; Tatum Hentemann; Glenn Howerton as Blake Walker; Kevin Michael Richardson as Sun in African face, CeeLo Green; Maya Rudolph as JoAnne Shalit; Mae Whitman as Chloe; Robert Wu as Moon in Asian face

Episode chronology
← Previous "The Simpsons Guy"	Next → "Baking Bad"
- Family Guy season 13

"The Book of Joe" is the second episode of the thirteenth season of the animated sitcom Family Guy, and the 233rd episode overall. It aired on Fox in the United States on October 5, 2014, and is written by Mike Desilets and directed by Mike Kim. In the episode, Peter helps Joe fulfill his dream of getting a book published, only to take over as the writer. In the meantime, Brian develops an extreme thirst for exercise.

== Plot ==
The neighbors are invited over to Joe's house for a pool party, and while looking around the house, Peter discovers that Joe has been writing a children's book called The Hopeful Squirrel about a paraplegic squirrel. Peter offers his support even though Joe has doubts about it. Joe sends his book to a publisher and they pick it up, but he decides to use the pen name "David Chicago" as his co-workers on the police force do not support creativity. At a book reading, his wheelchair and monotonous voice intimidate the children and Peter decides to step in for him, becoming a success. A reluctant Joe and his agent Blake Walker enlist Peter to become the "face" of the pen name. When interviewed by Tom Tucker, his humorous pokes at the handicapped get under Joe's skin while the fans find it funny. Joe confronts Peter over his angle on the book, but Peter uses the threat of the publisher's support and Joe quits the project.

Lois tries to talk to Peter after being informed by Bonnie about what happened, but he has bigger problems when he needs to write another book. He goes to Quagmire and Cleveland to come up with a story for the sequel, which differs greatly from the first book. At the debut of The Hopeful Squirrel 2, Peter's blue presentation shocks the parents and their children. The parents and children leave and Peter is fired by Blake while the book is dropped by the publishing company. Peter realizes that Joe is the true spirit of the book and goes to Joe's house to find him throwing away his writing materials and apologizes. Joe forgives Peter and admits he never would have published it in the beginning if it wasn’t for his encouragement.

Meanwhile, at a coffee shop, Brian obsesses over a runner named Chloe (voice by Mae Whitman) he sees and tries to impress her, scoring a date. When he arrives to pick her up, she decides they should go for a run and he achieves a "runner's high" more powerful than drugs and sleeps with her. Brian continues his workout and becomes more pretentious, annoying the family, and develops an in-shape yet rather gaunt figure which exposes his six nipples and frightens Stewie. Brian later dumps Chloe to train full-time for the Quahog Marathon. Stewie shows up there to support Brian but expresses reservations about his health. Unfortunately, as soon as the race starts, Brian's leg snaps due to joint damage from his excessive working out and he is immediately trampled by the other runners. At the Griffin residence, Brian's leg is in a cast as Stewie starts to talk about the itch that he will get on his ankle, but Stewie himself suddenly starts to have an itchy ankle.

== Reception ==
The episode received an audience of 3.63 million, the lowest in its timeslot, but the second-most watched show on Fox that night after The Simpsons episode "The Wreck of the Relationship". Narsimha Chintaluri of TV Fanatic gave the episode three-and-a-half stars out of five, saying "The best parts of tonight's episode come from the moments where the characters are allowed to be themselves - not the overlong sketches on the side."
