= Turkey Guys =

- Family Guy episode
- Episode no.: Season 13; Episode 5
- Directed by: Julius Wu
- Written by: Cherry Chevapravatdumrong
- Production code: CACX02
- Original air date: November 16, 2014

Guest appearances
- Lucas Grabeel as Boy in car; Tatum Hentemann as Little Girl; Emily Osment as Uncomfortably Hot 18-Year-Old Girl

Episode chronology
← Previous "Brian the Closer"	Next → "The 2000-Year-Old Virgin"
- Family Guy season 13

"Turkey Guys" is the fifth episode of the thirteenth season of the animated sitcom Family Guy, and the 236th episode overall. It aired on Fox in the United States on November 16, 2014, and is written by Cherry Chevapravatdumrong and directed by Julius Wu.

== Plot ==
The episode begins with a showing of a parody of the Macy's Thanksgiving Day Parade, the J. C. Penney Parade. On Thanksgiving morning, Lois sees Peter's photos in which he claims he and Brian ate the entire turkey planned for dinner that night, so Lois sends them out to find a replacement. Searching every store within sixty miles, they finally find the last one at the Highland Park Market. Peter's antics result in Brian making a deal that he will guard the turkey while Peter drives the car; Peter is not familiar with Brian's hybrid car and drives it into a lake, nearly drowning Brian while destroying his car and cellphone. Given a lift to the bus station, the two get on the bus, but are kicked off when Peter defecates into a bag. Peter steals a girl's bicycle off the front of the bus, but his pants fall down and get caught in the chain, causing an accident which destroys the bike. An attempt at hitch-hiking fails when the driver orders Peter at gunpoint to hand the turkey over.

When Brian calls Peter stupid, Peter responds by telling him that he had eaten the turkey by himself and framed Brian since in all the photos Brian was passed out. Despite the bad blood between each other, Peter and Brian have no option but to travel together. Passing the County Zoo, Peter gets the idea to steal a turkey, despite Brian's reservations. They find a turkey, but have to chase it through the zoo, causing all sorts of mayhem. Brian falls into the lion pen, but is rescued by Peter with a dead flamingo. He is grateful as Peter apologizes for his actions. Securing the turkey, they steal the zoo's tram train and arrive home.

Meanwhile, Lois' concern about Peter being out allows Stewie to convince Chris to step up as man of the house for the dinner. Stewie tries to coach Chris into his duties as the guests arrive. Lois is forced to stall for time entertaining guests. Lois greets her guests consisting of her parents, Quagmire, the Brown-Tubbs family, and the Swansons, including Kevin's new short girlfriend. Deciding to bail her out when Carter Pewterschmidt talks about the recent development in store products, Stewie is forced to step in after finding Chris unable to handle the pressure as he gets inebriated. Just as Stewie is about to do a speech at the dinner table, Peter arrives. When he takes the turkey out back to kill it, Peter finds he cannot go through with it. He apologizes to Lois and gets permission to invite the bird as a guest. As Peter, Lois, and the turkey face their guests, a drunken Chris arrives and shoots the turkey with a shotgun, killing it and providing them with turkey for dinner after all.

== Reception ==
The episode received an audience of 4.46 million, the lowest in its timeslot, but the third most watched show on Fox that night after The Simpsons episode "Blazed and Confused" and the Brooklyn Nine-Nine episode "Lockdown", beating the Bob's Burgers episode "Friends with Burger-fits". Amanda Wolf of TV Fanatic gave the episode three and a half stars out of five, saying "Watching felt like a good passage of time for me. It wasn't the best Family Guy, but certainly not the worst. Again, there was minimal use of the other characters, but focusing on the friendship between Brian and Peter is always worth that sacrifice. I also liked that everyone gathers at the Griffin house for Thanksgiving!"
