= Our Idiot Brian =

- Family Guy episode
- Episode no.: Season 13; Episode 9
- Directed by: John Holmquist
- Written by: Aaron Lee
- Original air date: January 11, 2015

Guest appearances
- Chris Diamantopoulos; Glenn Howerton as Lincoln's Cabinet Member; Martha MacIsaac as Patty; Bruce McGill as Lincoln's Cabinet Member; Christina Milian as Esther; Emily Osment as Ruth; DJ Qualls as Centipede; Fred Tatasciore as Russian Astronaut/Hulk; Robert Wu as Salon Patron

Episode chronology
← Previous "Stewie, Chris, & Brian's Excellent Adventure"	Next → "This Little Piggy"
- Family Guy season 13

"Our Idiot Brian" is the eighth episode of the thirteenth season of the animated sitcom Family Guy, and the 239th episode overall. It aired on Fox in the United States on January 11, 2015, and is written by Aaron Lee and directed by John Holmquist. The title is a play on the film Our Idiot Brother. The episode centers on Brian performing poorly on the SAT, leading the family into thinking that he is not as smart as he claims to be, although Peter shows him the upside to being unintelligent. The cause of Brian's change in behavior is found to be a brain tumor, and Stewie longs for Brian to have it removed to return to normal.

== Plot ==
Meg worries about passing her SAT to get into college, so her friends suggest she hire a smart person to take the test for her. She convinces Brian to do so, inflating his ego by reciting quotes from his novel Faster Than the Speed of Love. Brian disguises himself as Meg, goes to school and takes the test for her. Meg shows Brian that he failed badly, scoring just 1,000 out of 2,400. Deciding to spread the news that the remainder of the story will not be a "Meg episode", Chris rides off on his horse, Artemis. When he arrives in the village, Chris forgets what he is going to say and claims that Brian is getting another book published.

Peter tries to show Brian the upside of being stupid, and together they do low-brow activities like watching a demolition derby and visiting Orlando, Florida. However, Stewie is puzzled by Brian's massive and sudden personality changes. When Brian suffers a massive nosebleed and collapses, he is rushed to the hospital and Dr. Hartman reveals that Brian has a benign brain tumor, which has caused a decline in his intelligence. The family members are split on whether Brian should have the surgery to remove it, with Stewie wanting Brian to return to his old self and Brian enjoying his newfound life of enjoyable stupidity. Stewie uses the lure of a fake Kenny Chesney concert to take Brian to "cultured" activities like the opera, yoga, and an upscale restaurant instead.

However, Brian fully embraces being less intelligent and Stewie gives up and decides to adjust to the new reality, until Brian and Peter decide to enjoy a garage-set "London Fog" night, where they will take long and deep breaths as the exhaust from the car envelopes them, and Stewie realizes Brian's behavior is actually going to kill him. Deciding to use his stupidity against him, he tricks Brian into getting the operation by claiming that it is an operation to graft him another penis. Brian agrees to come along as he could watch Black Swan and shoot one load at Natalie Portman and another load at Mila Kunis (the actress who portrays Meg; Stewie also interrupts before Brian can say her name). At the hospital, Brian is returned to his normal pretentious self, and sarcastically "thanks" Stewie for taking away his life of restful sleep and much casual sex and returning him to being a pompous alcoholic who can only hang out with a baby. Peter shows off the double-penis operation he really did have to Lois, but unfortunately his original schlong falls off.

== Reception ==
The episode received an audience of 4.12 million, making it the second most watched show on Fox that night after The Simpsons episode "Bart's New Friend".

Seth MacFarlane's role in the episode was nominated for the Award for Outstanding Character Voice-Over Performance at the 67th Primetime Emmy Awards.
