= Brian the Closer =

- Family Guy episode
- Episode no.: Season 13; Episode 4
- Directed by: John Holmquist
- Written by: Steve Marmel
- Production code: BACX21
- Original air date: November 9, 2014

Guest appearances
- Yvette Nicole Brown as Jerome's Mom; Nana Visitor

Episode chronology
← Previous "Baking Bad"	Next → "Turkey Guys"
- Family Guy season 13

"Brian the Closer" is the fourth episode of the thirteenth season of the animated sitcom Family Guy, and the 235th episode overall. It aired on Fox in the United States on November 9, 2014, and is written by Steve Marmel and directed by John Holmquist. In the episode, Brian works for a real estate agency after his teeth got broken by Peter, which leads him into trouble with Quagmire.

== Plot ==
When Peter finds Brian's old rope toy in the couch, Brian becomes possessive of it, making Peter jealous. One day, when the rope toy is in Brian's mouth, Peter ties it to his car and drives off. Brian trails behind the car until Peter takes a sharp turn, causing him to let go of the rope toy by sending him flying into a fire hydrant, losing all his teeth and fracturing his nose severely in the process. Brian becomes miserable without his teeth and Lois refuses to spend money at the dentist to get him a new set since the procedure would be expensive and he is a non-human. While having a drink with Quagmire at The Drunken Clam, Brian becomes saddened until Quagmire gives him the number to his dentist where he has an account.

When Brian returns, the family finds that the dentist has given him a prominent smile. Apprehensive about his appearance, the family offers support. Brian begins to find the new look suits him. While out for a walk, he is mistaken for a real estate agent. When the actual agent shows up, he gives Brian a job offer to join the agency called Quahog Realty. He finds himself selling many properties, including one to Bonnie near a cliff and one to Jason Voorhees that overlooks a camp. The owner sees how good Brian is at selling good property and talks him into tackling a terrible condo. When Brian overhears that Quagmire has just received a bonus, he pays Quagmire back for the dental work and leads him into buying the property by convincing him it is a great investment.

After showing him the prospective video, Quagmire is still hesitant until Brian convinces him a hated rival pilot is after it. After the purchase, the guys accompany Quagmire to the property to find it is a rundown dump and was completely misrepresented. Joe reveals that there is an escape clause good for 72 hours after purchase, but when they arrive at Quahog Realty, Brian is not available and it is revealed that he has ducked out to hide for the 72 hours. Taking refuge at a motel, he finds Quagmire already waiting for him. Quagmire informs Brian that his already low opinion of him has been pushed even further. Brian confesses that Quagmire may be his only friend for being the only person in Quahog to call him out on his wrongs, but it is revealed to only be a ruse to outlast the 72 hours. Enraged, Quagmire grabs a lamp and knocks out and breaks Brian's teeth, ending his career. Returning to normal life, the family consoles Brian.

== Cultural references ==
While craving the rope toy, Peter becomes a Gollum-version of himself until Lois sends Peter away. Peter then returns as Johnny 5 from Short Circuit. The dumb beaver from "The Juice is Loose" is shown twice in the episode. Lois comments that Brian's new teeth make him look similar to Adam Carolla, who is known for voicing Death on the show. Brian sells a house to Jason Voorhees that overlooks a camp.

== Reception ==
The episode received an audience of 3.63 million, the lowest in its timeslot, but the third-most watched show on Fox that night after The Simpsons episode "Simpsorama" and Brooklyn Nine-Nine.

Narsimha Chintaluri of TV Fanatic gave the episode 4/5 stars.
