= Mr. and Mrs. Stewie =

- Family Guy episode
- Episode no.: Season 10; Episode 19
- Directed by: Joe Vaux
- Written by: Gary Janetti
- Production code: 9ACX17
- Original air date: April 29, 2012

Guest appearance
- Cate Blanchett as Penelope

Episode chronology
← Previous "You Can't Do That on Television, Peter"	Next → "Leggo My Meg-O"
- Family Guy season 10

"Mr. and Mrs. Stewie" is the nineteenth episode of the tenth season of the animated television series Family Guy, and the 184th episode overall. The episode originally aired on Fox in the United States on April 29, 2012. In this episode, Stewie finds his perfect match, Penelope, and Peter and Quagmire decide to take their friendship to a new level after Lois buys twin beds.

According to Nielsen Ratings, "Mr. and Mrs. Stewie" was watched by 5.63 million U.S. viewers and acquired a 2.8/7 rating. The episode received mainly positive reviews.

== Plot ==
Stewie is forced to come along to Brian's book reading. Brian makes up for keeping Stewie out all night (when Brian scores with a college girl) by taking Stewie to the park. There Stewie meets Penelope, a girl who takes revenge on a boy who pushes Stewie, by feeding the boy taffy laced with superglue. Stewie discovers they share a love of mathematics and advanced weaponry. When he discovers that Penelope actually managed to kill her mother, he becomes totally enamored. They wreak havoc all over the world, destroying the Eiffel Tower and the Great Wall of China, causing India and Pakistan to conduct nuclear war with each other, and destroying Copenhagen with a tidal wave (while incorporating a Roaring Twenties theme).

Brian tries to convince him that while Stewie causes chaos as part of a grand scheme, Penelope does it just for kicks. As Penelope plots to kill a teacher, Stewie tells her that Brian suggested they take it easy. Penelope demands that Stewie kill Brian. Stewie is reluctant due to their friendship. He tries to steel himself but ultimately cannot do it. Penelope decides to do the job herself. Stewie secretly thwarts several of her attempts before confessing all to Brian. Penelope and Stewie battle, and she agrees to leave Brian alone. Penelope kisses Stewie goodbye but leaves him hanging from a lamppost. Brian thanks Stewie for saving his life.

Meanwhile, Lois tires of being crushed at night by Peter in bed. She replaces their shared bed with twin beds. Unable to sleep alone, Peter proposes that he and Quagmire become bunk buddies. As their friendship blossoms, Quagmire gives Peter a "giggity band". Lois misses Peter and asks him to return. Peter rises from Quagmire's bed, revealing he has crushed the seriously injured Quagmire during the night.

== Production ==
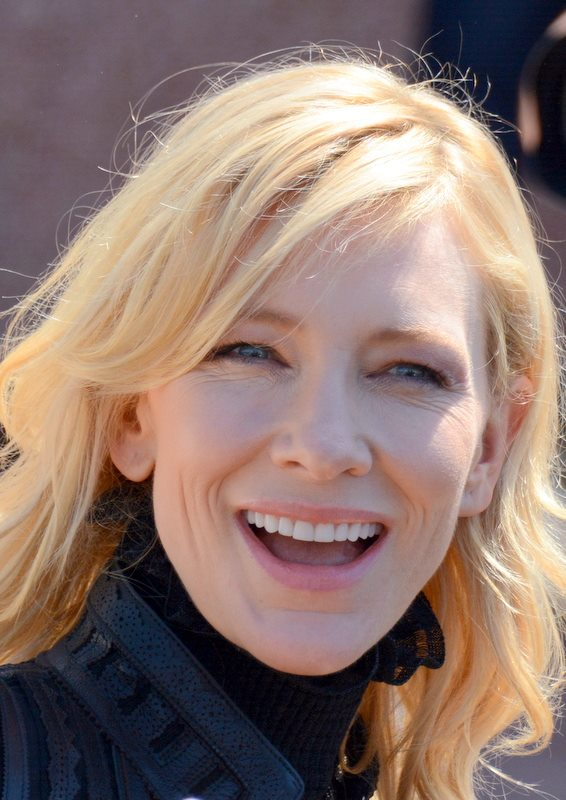
Cate Blanchett guest starred in this episode.

This episode was written by Gary Janetti, who has been with the show since its first season when he wrote "Brian: Portrait of a Dog". This episode is Janetti's second writing credit for the season, since he also wrote "Stewie Goes for a Drive". The episode was directed by Joe Vaux, this being his first directing credit for the series. This episode featured Cate Blanchett as Penelope.

== Cultural references ==
The episode name is a reference to the 2005 film Mr. & Mrs. Smith.

== Reception ==
This episode was watched by 5.63 million viewers, airing on the same night with Desperate Housewives on ABC, according to Nielsen ratings. It has a 2.8/7 rating share in the 18-49 demographic group, losing to Desperate Housewives. The ratings raised from the previous episode, "You Can't Do That on Television, Peter".

This episode received mainly positive reviews. Kevin McFarland from The A.V. Club gave a B+ grade. He liked the humor that is used in the episode, especially for Brian and Stewie's moments, saying "This episode featured a lot of the humor that frequently works for me. It focused on Brian’s snobbery at the book reading, seducing a college creative writing student at a Jonathan Franzen reading. I always like jokes that show Brian as a dog, so I found Stewie using the spray bottle to prevent Brian from hijacking the reading with his own work pretty hilarious." However, he criticized how the family treats Meg, and disliked the sub-plot with Peter. Carter Doston of TV Fanatic gave a 3/5 rating. He enjoyed the Stewie and Penelope fight scene, calling it "entertaining", but said that "it wasn't as long and drawn-out as any of the Giant Chicken fights".
