= Encyclopedia Griffin =

- Family Guy episode
- Peter, Cleveland and Joe discover "Heather", Chris's life-size female doll
- Episode no.: Season 13; Episode 11
- Directed by: Jerry Langford
- Written by: Lew Morton
- Original air date: February 15, 2015

Guest appearances
- Nat Faxon; Allison Janney as Mistress Vita

Episode chronology
← Previous "Quagmire's Mom"	Next → "Stewie Is Enceinte"
- Family Guy season 13

"Encyclopedia Griffin" is the 11th episode of the thirteenth season of the animated sitcom Family Guy, and the 242nd episode overall. It aired on Fox in the United States on February 15, 2015, and is written by Lew Morton and directed by Jerry Langford.

== Plot ==
After someone steals Stewie's tricycle, Peter sets out to find who did it. He and his friends interrogate a child in the neighborhood and find the child who stole it. The successful feeling, and being hired to find another child's baseball cards, inspire them to open a detective agency. They take cases such as a gumball machine that takes a child's money. Pursuing a rash of thefts, they watch hidden camera footage of Chris sneaking in and taking things. Searching his room, they find a life-size female doll made out of the stolen items as he arrives to protect "Heather."

The doll creeps out Lois and she thinks it may be a reflection of her sex life with Peter. Peter has a talk with Chris and finds that the doll is not being used for sex, as she has been holding out so Peter tries to make Chris sexy for the doll. When she collapses into his lap, Chris takes it as wanting sex although Lois chews out Peter for ignoring her instructions to make him get rid of it so she gives him the silent treatment. She is almost fooled when flowers arrive for "Heather" but realizes that Chris treats his doll better than Peter does her.

After finding out that Heather and Chris have a picnic planned, Lois asks if she and Peter can tag along so Peter can be reminded what romance is like, but his stupidity repeatedly backfires in Lois' face. Fed up with jealousy, Lois takes the doll in the night. She denies seeing it and encourages him to move on. Instead, he cries over her leaving.

Lois sees him depressed and decides to show him where she buried the doll after stabbing it. She apologizes, but encourages him to treat a real girlfriend like he treated the doll and he will be happy. That night, Peter admits that he did learn a lesson as Chris arrives with a dominatrix named Mistress Vita. Peter tries to fake the end of the show early and succeeds when Lois notices that Mistress Vita knows his name.

== Reception ==
The episode received an audience of 2.51 million, making it the second-most watched show on Fox that night after The Simpsons episode "My Fare Lady".

The Parents Television Council, a long-time critic of Family Guy, named the episode as the "Worst of the Week", the second time in a row for the series, taking offense at what they saw as sexualization of children.
