= Steve Callaghan =

American screenwriter

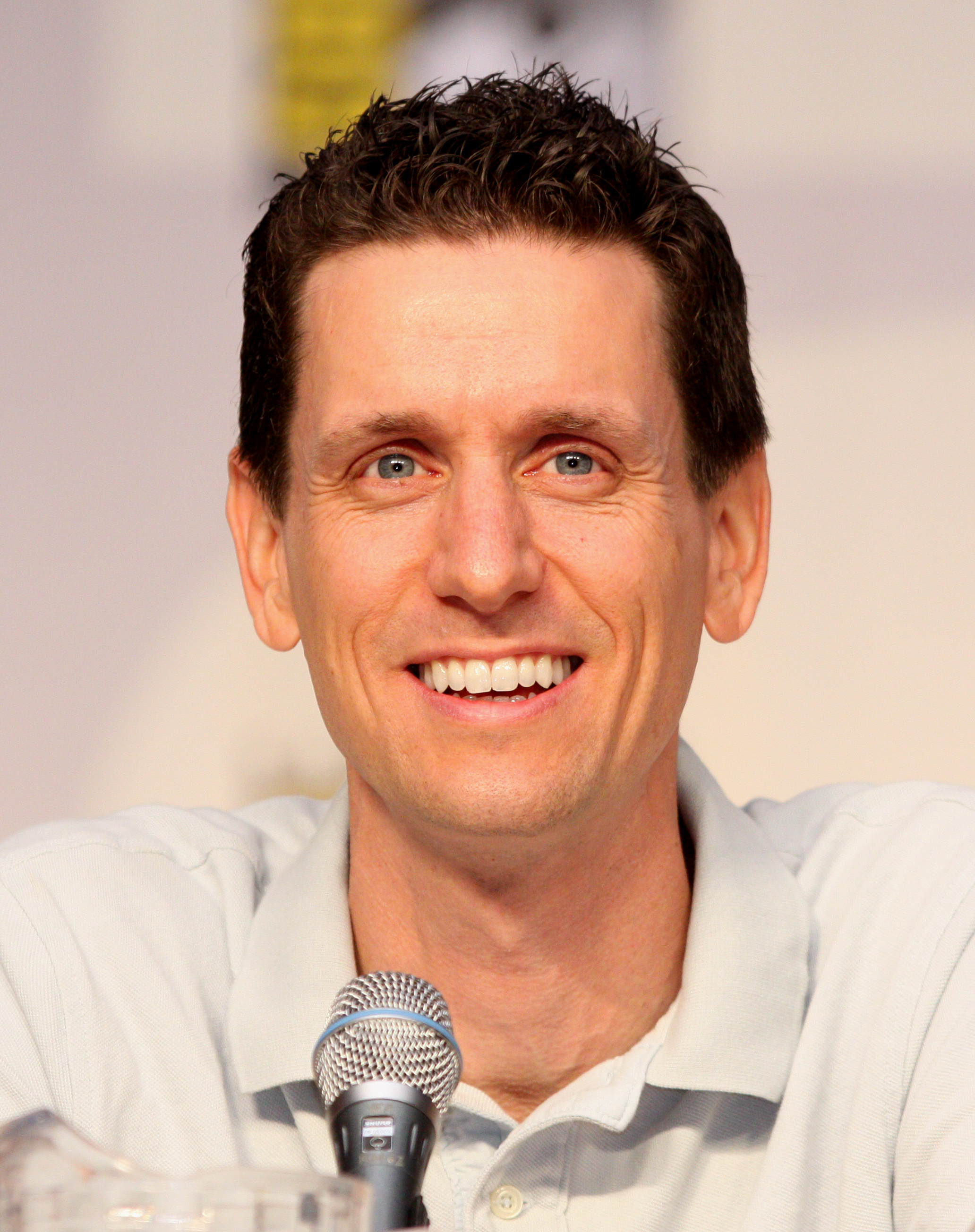
- Steve Callaghan at the 2010 San Diego Comic-Con
- Born: Steven Callaghan
- Occupations: Television writer, executive producer, voice actor, producer
- Years active: 1999–present

Steve Callaghan is an American screenwriter, producer and actor, best known for his work as a writer, executive producer, and showrunner of Family Guy. He is a graduate of both the UCLA Department of Communication and the Department of Public Policy at the UCLA School of Public Affairs. A two-time Emmy nominee, Callaghan has worked as a writer and producer on television shows such as 3-South and Yes, Dear and as a writer, executive producer, and showrunner on series such as Family Guy, American Dad! and Trivia Night Mysteries.

Callaghan started his career in 1999 as a writers' assistant on the animated series Family Guy, and soon after became one of the first members of the original writing staff of the show. He served as co-executive producer during the show's fifth, sixth, and seventh seasons, and as executive producer during the show's eighth season. During the show's cancellation from 2003 to 2005, Callaghan wrote for the CBS television sitcom Yes, Dear and the animated television series 3-South on MTV.

In 2009, it was announced that Callaghan would begin serving as executive producer and co-showrunner for Family Guy and would oversee the show's transition to high definition, beginning in the ninth season and ending in the fifteenth season. Following his stint as showrunner, Callaghan has remained and currently serves as a writer and executive producer of Family Guy. Callaghan has authored two books about the series, including Family Guy: Stewie's Guide to World Domination and a guide to the first three seasons of the show.

In 2013, Callaghan was also named executive producer and showrunner for the eighth season of American Dad!.

In addition, he is co-creator, writer, executive producer and showrunner of a series of "whodunnit"-style murder mystery television movies called Trivia Night Mysteries, which is set to premiere in 2027.

For his work on Family Guy, Callaghan has twice been nominated for a Primetime Emmy Award (including a nomination for Outstanding Comedy Series in 2009).

== Credits ==
Callaghan has worked on the following series and wrote the below-listed episodes:

- Family Guy (1999-present) – writer, executive producer, co-showrunner (2009-2016), co-executive producer, producer, co-producer, story editor, staff writer
  - "Fifteen Minutes of Shame" (2000)
  - "The Thin White Line" (2001)
  - "Mr. Saturday Knight" (2001)
  - "To Love and Die in Dixie" (2001)
  - "Blind Ambition" (2005)
  - "Model Misbehavior" (2005)
  - "I Take Thee, Quagmire" (co-writer) (2006)
  - "Stu & Stewie's Excellent Adventure" (2006)
  - "Whistle While Your Wife Works" (2006)
  - "Bill & Peter's Bogus Journey" (2007)
  - "Lois Kills Stewie" (2007)
  - "The Former Life of Brian" (2008)
  - "Dog Gone" (2009)
  - "Extra Large Medium" (2010)
  - "Trading Places" (2011)
  - "Be Careful What You Fish For" (2012)
  - "Roads to Vegas" (2013)
  - "Fresh Heir" (2014)
  - "A Lot Going On Upstairs" (2016)
  - "The Peter Principal" (2017)
  - "Boy (Dog) Meets Girl (Dog)" (2018)
  - "Island Adventure" (2019)
  - "Cat Fight" (2019)
  - "Boys & Squirrels" (2020)
  - "Boy's Best Friend" (2021)
  - "Christmas Crime" (2021)
  - "A Wife-Changing Experience" (2022)
  - "Carny Knowledge" (2022)
  - "Take This Job and Love It" (2024)
  - "Dog is My Co-Pilot" (2025)
  - "Hard Times at Adam West High" (2025)
  - "The Fat Lotus" (2025)
  - "Scent of a Woman" (2026)
- 3-South (2002-03) - co-producer, writer
  - "Midnight Del" (2003)
- Yes, Dear (2003) - writer
  - "Jimmy's Dumb" (2003)
- American Dad! (2014) – executive producer, showrunner, writer
- Trivia Night Mysteries (2027-present) – created by, writer, executive producer, showrunner
  - "A Question of Murder" (2027)
  - "Fit for a Murder" (2027)
  - "A Fatal Lesson" (2027)
