= Family Guy season 9 =

Season of television series

Family Guy
- Season 9
- DVD covers for Volumes 9 and 10
- Showrunners: Mark Hentemann; Steve Callaghan
- Starring: Seth MacFarlane; Alex Borstein; Seth Green; Mila Kunis; Mike Henry
- No. of episodes: 18

Release
- Original network: Fox
- Original release: September 26, 2010 – May 22, 2011

Season chronology
- ← Previous; Season 8 Next → Season 10

The ninth season of animated television series Family Guy first aired on the Fox network in eighteen episodes from September 26, 2010, to May 22, 2011, before being released as two DVD box sets and in syndication. Family Guy follows the dysfunctional Griffin family—father Peter, mother Lois, daughter Meg, son Chris, baby Stewie and dog Brian, all of whom reside in their hometown of Quahog.

Season nine was the debut of the series' eighth production season, which was executive produced by Chris Sheridan, David Goodman, Danny Smith, Mark Hentemann, Steve Callaghan and series creator Seth MacFarlane. The season's showrunners were Hentemann and Callaghan.

The season received a mixed reception from critics, who called it "a mixture of laugh out loud gags, groan inducing puns, and astonishing 'I can't believe they got away with that' statements." Season nine contains some of the series' most acclaimed episodes, including "And Then There Were Fewer", "Road to the North Pole" and "New Kidney in Town", as well as some of the most controversial episodes, including "And I'm Joyce Kinney", "Friends of Peter G.", and "The Hand That Rocks the Wheelchair". This season marks the first time Family Guy aired in 720p high definition and widescreen with a remastered title sequence, marking it the final Fox show to switch to high definition . It was nominated for a Primetime Emmy Award for Outstanding Music Composition for a Series, Outstanding Original Music and Lyrics and Outstanding Sound Mixing for a Comedy or Drama Series and Animation.

The Volume Nine DVD box set was released in Region 1 on December 13, 2011, and was released in Region 2 on May 9, 2011 (titled Season 10) and Region 4 on June 15, 2011. Three of the eighteen episodes are included in the volume. The remaining fourteen episodes were included in the Volume Ten DVD box set, released in Region 2 on November 3, 2011, titled Season 11, Region 4 on February 29, 2012, and finally on Region 1 on September 24, 2012. One other episode, "It's a Trap!", was released independently on DVD.

In the UK, the debut episodes were shown on Sunday nights from May to July 2011 on BBC Three. These repeated the Saturday after.

== Voice cast and characters ==
- Seth MacFarlane as Peter Griffin, Brian Griffin, Stewie Griffin, Glenn Quagmire, Tom Tucker
- Alex Borstein as Lois Griffin, Tricia Takanawa, Barbara "Babs" Pewterschmidt
- Seth Green as Chris Griffin, Neil Goldman
- Mila Kunis as Meg Griffin
- Mike Henry as Cleveland Brown, John Herbert, Consuela

=== Supporting characters ===
- Lori Alan as Diane Simmons
- Drew Barrymore as Jillian
- H. Jon Benjamin as Carl
- Johnny Brennan as Mort Goldman
- Gary Cole as Principal Shepherd
- Barclay DeVeau as Patty
- Carrie Fisher as Angela
- Christine Lakin as Joyce Kinney
- Phil LaMarr as Ollie Williams
- Natasha Melnick as Ruth
- Christina Milian as Esther
- Nicole Sullivan as Muriel Goldman
- Jennifer Tilly as Bonnie Swanson
- Patrick Warburton as Joe Swanson
- Adam West as Mayor Adam West
- Lisa Wilhoit as Connie D'Amico

== Episodes ==
No. overall	No. in season	Title	Directed by	Written by	Original release date	Prod. code	U.S. viewers (millions)
148	1	"And Then There Were Fewer"	Dominic Polcino	Cherry Chevapravatdumrong	September 26, 2010	8ACX01	9.13
148	1	"And Then There Were Fewer"	Dominic Polcino	Cherry Chevapravatdumrong	September 26, 2010	8ACX02	9.13
In a parody of a murder mystery, the residents of Quahog are invited over to an honorary dinner at James Woods' mansion, where Quagmire's date Stephanie, Woods, his girlfriend Priscilla, Muriel Goldman, and Derek Wilcox are all murdered in sequence. A bloody golden globe and Priscilla's dead body are found in Tom Tucker's room leading the group to believe he is the killer. In the morning, Lois finds out that Diane Simmons is the true killer, and she did it because James Woods was an ex who dumped her on her 40th birthday. Simultaneously, Tom pushed Channel 5 to replace her with a younger news anchor, motivating her to kill Woods and frame the evening's events on Tom. As she prepares to kill Lois, she is shot and killed by Stewie, vowing to be the one to kill Lois. Note: This episode was dedicated to Perry MacFarlane mother of Seth and Rachael MacFarlane.
149	2	"Excellence in Broadcasting"	John Holmquist	Patrick Meighan	October 3, 2010	8ACX03	7.98
Brian decides to confront Rush Limbaugh when he visits Quahog for a book signing. Brian becomes a Republican after reading Rush's book. As Lois opposes his new ideas, he moves in with Rush and tries to "help" his party in different ways.
150	3	"Welcome Back, Carter"	Cyndi Tang	Wellesley Wild	October 10, 2010	8ACX04	6.97
After Peter catches Carter having an affair, he is strong-armed into keeping a secret. Joe and Quagmire tell him about how he can use this situation to blackmail Carter. But when Peter accidentally reveals the secret, Lois's mother demands a divorce and Peter is in charge of Carter's return to bachelorhood.
151	4	"Halloween on Spooner Street"	Jerry Langford	Andrew Goldberg	November 7, 2010	8ACX06	8.00
When Halloween comes to Quahog, Peter and Joe team up to execute a series of Halloween pranks on Quagmire. While Brian shows Stewie the ropes of trick-or-treating, Meg sets out to attend her first high school Halloween party with high hopes for the evening. She and Chris, who have both dressed up in an attempt to hide their faces, find themselves in an unpleasant situation.
152	5	"Baby, You Knock Me Out"	Julius Wu	Alex Carter	November 14, 2010	8ACX05	7.06
After Lois accidentally gets involved in boxing, she proves herself extremely skilled in the ring as she tries to picture Peter in place of her opponent. Peter gets ambitious and tries to make Lois a professional boxer even when she is resistant.
153	6	"Brian Writes a Bestseller"	Joseph Lee	Gary Janetti	November 21, 2010	8ACX07	6.59
After feeling discouraged with the progress of his writing career, Brian decides to throw in the towel until Stewie become his manager and one of his books hits the bestseller list. But when the fame goes to his head, Brian gets a wake-up call from Bill Maher himself.
154	7	"Road to the North Pole"	Greg Colton	Chris Sheridan & Danny Smith	December 12, 2010	8ACX08	8.03
154	7	"Road to the North Pole"	Greg Colton	Chris Sheridan & Danny Smith	December 12, 2010	8ACX09	8.03
After getting blown off by the mall's Santa, Brian and Stewie travel to the North Pole to get revenge on Santa Claus. They get there, only to find that Santa is very sick and near dying because of all the work he does each Christmas. Brian and Stewie promise to deliver the presents for him, but fail at the first stop after being discovered by a family. On Christmas morning, when everyone wakes up with no presents under their trees, Brian explains the problem on the news and tells them to shorten their demands to one gift a year. Everyone agrees and one year later, Santa recovers and everyone has a merry Christmas.
155	8	"New Kidney in Town"	Pete Michels	Matt Harrigan & Dave Willis	January 9, 2011	8ACX10	9.33
After Peter gets into a highly addictive Red Bull obsession, Lois gets rid of his Red Bull and tells him that the beverage isn’t healthy, afterwards, when Peter makes his own Red Bull, which includes kerosene in his beverage, he is diagnosed with kidney failure, where Brian agrees to give him both of his kidneys and the family prepares to bid adieu their dog. Meanwhile, Chris is chosen to introduce President Obama at his school after winning an essay contest, but the main issue is that Meg wrote the essay instead of Chris.
156	9	"And I'm Joyce Kinney"	Dominic Bianchi	Alec Sulkin	January 16, 2011	8ACX12	7.06
Lois encounters the replacement to Diane as the anchorwoman for Quahog's news station, Joyce Kinney. Seeking a bond with someone famous out of sheer ego, Lois tries to befriend her. During a late-night dinner, Lois accidentally confides in Kinney that she is a former porn star. Kinney promptly reveals this on the news the next day which turns Lois into a pariah and enrages her. When Lois confronts her, Kinney reveals she's an ex-classmate of Lois during her days as a high-school cheerleader and that revealing her secret was part of a deep-seated grudge she had on Lois because of a prank she played on Kinney in high school. Lois becomes depressed leading Brian to try and pull her out of it. Eventually, Lois decides to publicly admit her mistake during a church sermon and eventually win the town's approval back and completely infuriating Kinney.
157	10	"Friends of Peter G."	John Holmquist	Brian Scully	February 13, 2011	8ACX13	5.98
Brian and Peter are required to attend a 12-step program to deal with their drinking problems after a night of their disruptive drunken behavior; Death demonstrates Peter a glimpse of what life would be like without beer.
158	11	"German Guy"	Cyndi Tang	Patrick Meighan	February 20, 2011	8ACX14	6.57
When Chris searches for a new hobby, he befriends an elderly German puppeteer named Franz until Herbert reveals his true identity. After he and Peter get in trouble with Franz, the duo are rescued by Herbert until he and Franz get into a fight, which ends with Franz meeting his death by falling off the porch stairs.
159	12	"The Hand That Rocks the Wheelchair"	Brian Iles	Tom Devanney	March 6, 2011	8ACX11	6.33
Meg is enlisted to check in on Susie and Joe while Bonnie is away but she soon becomes a little too involved. Lois intervenes when she realizes that Meg‘s misrepresentation of the situation. Meanwhile, Stewie accidentally creates an evil twin. When he tries to take Stewie's place, Brian has to step in.
160	13	"Trading Places"	Joseph Lee	Steve Callaghan	March 20, 2011	8ACX17	6.55
Chris, Meg, Peter and Lois all trade places to teach each other a lesson. The stunt backfires on everyone except Meg, who surprisingly becomes an excellent housewife. Chris, however, proves to be incredibly productive at Peter's desk job leading Angela to fire Peter and replace him with Chris. Angela then proceeds to overwork Chris to the point where he becomes drunk which eventually leads to a stress-induced heart attack.
161	14	"Tiegs for Two"	Jerry Langford	John Viener	April 10, 2011	8ACX16	6.59
Brian tries to score on a date with a new friend, Denise, but ends up striking out. Instead of throwing in the towel, he attends Quagmire's new class on how to score women. Disappointingly for Brian, the class was not on finding love but simply on getting sex. Fed up with Quagmire, he later encounters Cheryl Tiegs. Brian and Cheryl hit it off immediately and the former begins rubbing it in Quagmire's face. This leads Quagmire to snag Jillian Russell (Brian's greatest romantic conquest) and rub it in Brian's face in response. Meanwhile, when the local dry cleaner loses his favorite white shirt, Peter goes ballistic.
162	15	"Brothers & Sisters"	Julius Wu	Alex Carter	April 17, 2011	8ACX15	5.98
Lois becomes skeptical when she hears that Mayor West is marrying her sister Carol, due to the problems she had before with nine break-ups. Meanwhile, Peter is ecstatic at the thought of having a new brother and gets mad at Lois when she tries to prevent the marriage.
163	16	"The Big Bang Theory"	Dominic Polcino	David A. Goodman	May 8, 2011	8ACX18	6.52
Stewie discovers that his time travel has in someway caused the Big Bang that formed the universe, so when Bertram reveals his plan of killing Leonardo da Vinci, Stewie's ancestor, in order to erase Stewie from the universe, he and Brian go back in time to stop Bertram from accidentally deleting the whole universe too.
164	17	"Foreign Affairs"	Pete Michels	Anthony Blasucci & Mike Desilets	May 15, 2011	8ACX19	6.44
When both Bonnie and Lois travel to Paris, Lois finds out that Bonnie only wants to go there to have an affair. After Joe discovers Bonnie's plans, he travels to Paris to try to get her back. All the while, Peter unsuccessfully homeschools both Meg and Chris.
165	18	"It's a Trap!"	Peter Shin	Cherry Chevapravatdumrong & David A. Goodman	May 22, 2011 (Note: This episode was first released in It's a Trap! and Laugh It Up, Fuzzball: The Family Guy Trilogy DVD on December 21, 2010.)	7ACX21	5.84
165	18	"It's a Trap!"	Peter Shin	Cherry Chevapravatdumrong & David A. Goodman	May 22, 2011	7ACX22	5.84
Peter retells the story of Star Wars: Return of the Jedi.

== Production ==
Production for the ninth season began in 2009, during the airing of the eighth season. The season was executive produced by series regulars Chris Sheridan, David Goodman, Danny Smith, Mark Hentemann and Steve Callaghan, along with series creator Seth MacFarlane. The showrunners for the ninth season were Hentemann and Callaghan, who oversaw the series's transition into 720p high definition in the premiere of the ninth-season episode "And Then There Were Fewer".

As production began, Callaghan, Andrew Goldberg, Mark Hentemann, Patrick Meighan, Brian Scully, Chris Sheridan, Danny Smith, Alec Sulkin, John Viener and Wellesley Wild all stayed on from the previous season. Matt Harrigan, Dave Willis, Anthony Blasucci and Mike Desilets received their first writing credit for the series. Series executive producer David A. Goodman returned as a writer for the series, with Goodman leaving immediately afterward to work on the Fox animated series Allen Gregory. Kirker Butler, who wrote five episodes for the show, left the series before the beginning of the ninth season, in order to write for the Fox animated series The Cleveland Show, a spin-off of Family Guy. Writer John Viener left the series at the end of the season to also write for The Cleveland Show. Recurring directors Dominic Bianchi, Greg Colton, John Holmquist, Brian Iles, Jerry Langford, Pete Michels, James Purdum, Cyndi Tang and Julius Wu all stayed with the show from the previous season. Peter Shin briefly returned to the series as a director to direct the sequel to the episode "Something, Something, Something, Dark Side", entitled "It's a Trap!". Shin also served as supervising director for the season, along with James Purdum.

The main cast consisted of Seth MacFarlane (Peter Griffin, Stewie Griffin, Brian Griffin, Quagmire and Tom Tucker, among others), Alex Borstein (Lois Griffin, Loretta Brown, Tricia Takanawa and Barbara Pewterschmidt, among others), Mila Kunis (Meg Griffin), Seth Green (Chris Griffin and Neil Goldman, among others) and Mike Henry (Cleveland Brown and Herbert, among others).

== Home media ==
The remaining episodes of the eighth season and the first three episodes of the ninth season were released on DVD by 20th Century Fox Home Entertainment in the United States and Canada on December 13, 2011. The DVD release features bonus material including four featurettes, "Who Done It? The Making of 'And Then There Were Fewer'", "Brian & Stewie: The Lost Phone Call", "The History of the World According to Family Guy" and the Family Guy panel at the 2010 San Diego Comic-Con, along with audio commentaries, animatics and deleted scenes.

Family Guy Volume Nine / Season 10
Set details			Special features
14 episodes; 3-disc set; 1.33:1 aspect ratio (first 11 episodes)/Widescreen: 1.78:1 ratio video (last 3 episodes); Languages: English (Dolby Digital 5.1, with subtitles); Spanish (Dolby Digital, with subtitles); French (Dolby Digital, with subtitles)			Optional commentary; Deleted/extended scenes; Animatics for three episodes; "And Then There Were Fewer" featurette; "Brian & Stewie: The Lost Phone Call" featurette; "The History of the World According to Family Guy" featurette; Family Guy panel at the 2010 San Diego Comic-Con
Release dates			Optional commentary; Deleted/extended scenes; Animatics for three episodes; "And Then There Were Fewer" featurette; "Brian & Stewie: The Lost Phone Call" featurette; "The History of the World According to Family Guy" featurette; Family Guy panel at the 2010 San Diego Comic-Con
Region 1	Region 2	Region 4	Optional commentary; Deleted/extended scenes; Animatics for three episodes; "And Then There Were Fewer" featurette; "Brian & Stewie: The Lost Phone Call" featurette; "The History of the World According to Family Guy" featurette; Family Guy panel at the 2010 San Diego Comic-Con
December 13, 2011	May 9, 2011	June 15, 2011	Optional commentary; Deleted/extended scenes; Animatics for three episodes; "And Then There Were Fewer" featurette; "Brian & Stewie: The Lost Phone Call" featurette; "The History of the World According to Family Guy" featurette; Family Guy panel at the 2010 San Diego Comic-Con

Family Guy Volume Ten / Season 11
Set details			Special features
14 episodes; 3-disc set; Widescreen: 1.78:1 ratio video; Languages: English (Dolby Digital 5.1, with subtitles); Spanish (Dolby Digital, with subtitles); French (Dolby Digital, with subtitles)			Deleted/extended scenes; Select-scene animatics for "Baby, You Knock Me Out" and "Trading Places"; The Cleveland Show bonus episode ("The Way the Cookie Crumbles" [Region 1], "Beer Walk!" [Regions 2 and 4]); Digital copy: 20 clips-to-go, 5 mash-ups, 15 best moments from Volume 10/Season 11 and 9 downloadable songs
Release dates			Deleted/extended scenes; Select-scene animatics for "Baby, You Knock Me Out" and "Trading Places"; The Cleveland Show bonus episode ("The Way the Cookie Crumbles" [Region 1], "Beer Walk!" [Regions 2 and 4]); Digital copy: 20 clips-to-go, 5 mash-ups, 15 best moments from Volume 10/Season 11 and 9 downloadable songs
Region 1	Region 2	Region 4	Deleted/extended scenes; Select-scene animatics for "Baby, You Knock Me Out" and "Trading Places"; The Cleveland Show bonus episode ("The Way the Cookie Crumbles" [Region 1], "Beer Walk!" [Regions 2 and 4]); Digital copy: 20 clips-to-go, 5 mash-ups, 15 best moments from Volume 10/Season 11 and 9 downloadable songs
September 25, 2012	November 7, 2011	February 29, 2012	Deleted/extended scenes; Select-scene animatics for "Baby, You Knock Me Out" and "Trading Places"; The Cleveland Show bonus episode ("The Way the Cookie Crumbles" [Region 1], "Beer Walk!" [Regions 2 and 4]); Digital copy: 20 clips-to-go, 5 mash-ups, 15 best moments from Volume 10/Season 11 and 9 downloadable songs
