= And I'm Joyce Kinney =

- Family Guy episode
- Episode no.: Season 9 Episode 9
- Directed by: Dominic Bianchi
- Written by: Alec Sulkin
- Production code: 8ACX12
- Original air date: January 16, 2011

Guest appearances
- Kirker Butler as Guest; Colin Ford; Christine Lakin as Joyce Kinney; Rachael MacFarlane; Helen Reddy as herself; Jennifer Tilly as Bonnie Swanson

Episode chronology
← Previous "New Kidney in Town"	Next → "Friends of Peter G."
- Family Guy season 9

"And I'm Joyce Kinney" is the ninth episode of the ninth season of the animated comedy series Family Guy. It originally aired on Fox in the United States on January 16, 2011. The episode follows housewife Lois as she becomes close friends with the local news anchor Joyce Kinney. In an attempt to become closer, the two decide to get drinks together, and reveal their darkest secrets. Wanting to fit in, Lois reveals her participation in a pornographic film when she was in college, with Joyce promising to keep her revelation a secret. The next day, Kinney unveils the story on the local news, much to the anger of Lois, who is quickly shunned by the entire town.

The episode was written by Alec Sulkin and directed by Dominic Bianchi. It received mixed reviews from critics for its storyline and many cultural references. According to Nielsen ratings, it was viewed in 7.08 million homes in its original airing. The episode featured guest performances by Kirker Butler, Colin Ford, Christine Lakin, Rachael MacFarlane, Helen Reddy and Jennifer Tilly, along with several recurring guest voice actors for the series. "And I'm Joyce Kinney" was one of five episodes submitted for consideration for an Emmy Award in the "Outstanding Comedy Series" category in 2011.

== Plot ==
As the family gathers around the television to watch the local news, Lois states her fondness of the new co-anchor, Joyce Kinney. Later that day, the family attends church, and while there, Lois learns of a local bake sale, and decides to bring her own baked goods. Going to the store to buy ingredients, Lois notices Joyce shopping there as well, and approaches her. The two quickly become close friends, and they decide to spend the day together at the news studio. That night, Lois and Joyce decide to get a drink together, and share stories. Reluctant at first to tell Joyce her darkest secret, she soon reveals that she was in an adult film when she was in college in the 1980s, before she met Peter. Despite Joyce promising to keep it a secret, Lois is shocked when the local news reveals her participation in the making of the pornography.

Confronting Joyce about the story, Lois questions her intentions, with Joyce revealing that the two attended high school together, where she was fat and was known as Joyce Chevapravatdumrong (her real last name). She also reveals that Lois humiliated her in front of the entire school, by placing a hotdog in her mouth and pulling down her pants while blindfolded (revealing her pink underwear), and has sought revenge ever since. Since the revelation of her porno past, Lois is made a pariah and her kids face their share of ridicule at school. At church on Sunday, Lois and her family entered but were immediately demanded to leave by the preacher. Despondent, Lois is eventually inspired by Brian to face her mistake by showing it to the church. The porno causes the church to reaccept her and admit the Griffin family back into their congregation due to a positive opinion of the film, much to Joyce's annoyance. Meanwhile, Stewie develops suspicions of having been conceived through the creation of the porno, heightened when he sees that one of the actors has a football-shaped head like his.

== Production and development ==
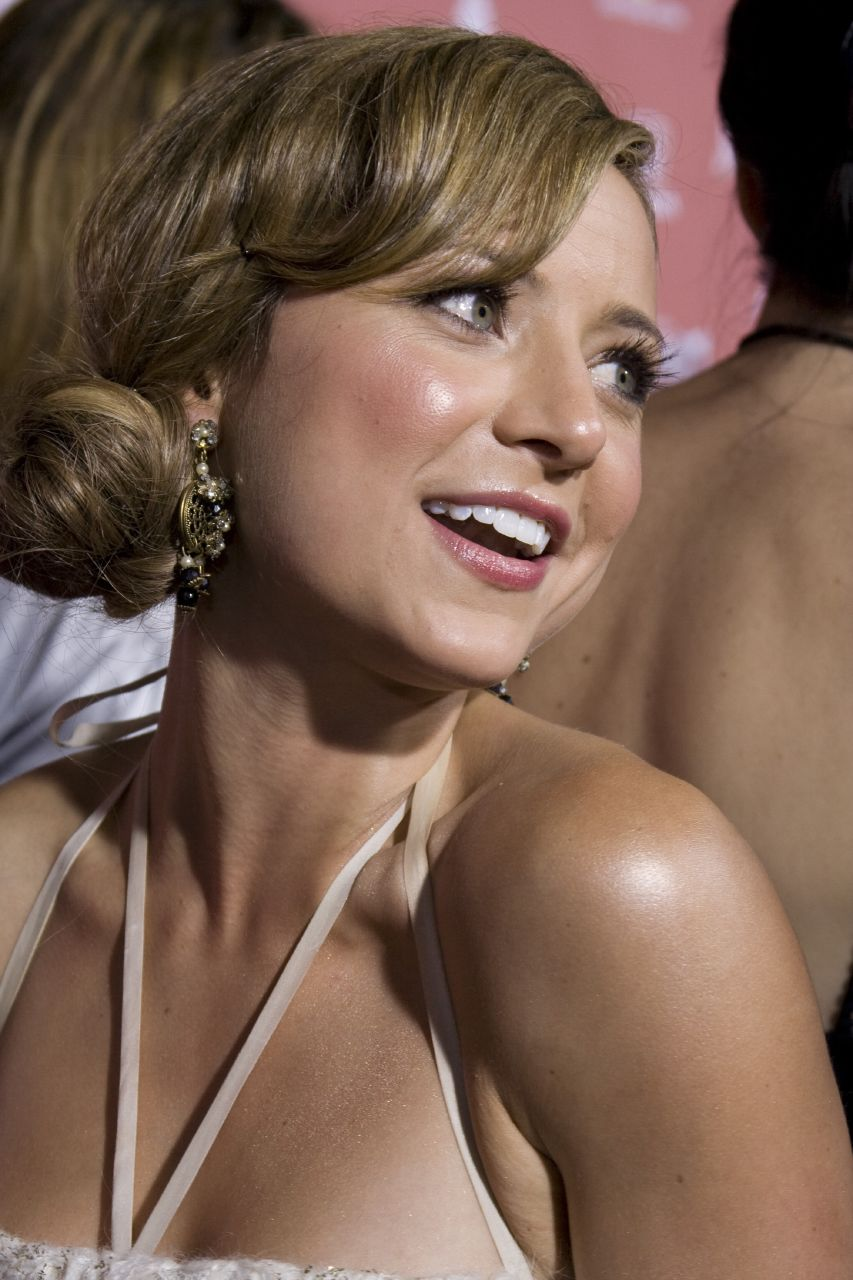
Christine Lakin provided the voice of Joyce Kinney.

"And I'm Joyce Kinney" was written by series regular Alec Sulkin, in his first episode for the season. The episode was directed by series regular Dominic Bianchi, shortly after the conclusion of the eighth production season, also in his first episode for the season. Series veterans Peter Shin and James Purdum, both of whom having previously served as animation directors, served as supervising directors for the episode. Alex Carter, Andrew Goldberg, Elaine Ko, Spencer Porter and Aaron Blitzstein served as staff writers for the episode. Composer Walter Murphy, who has worked on the series since its inception, returned to compose the music for "And I'm Joyce Kinney".

The episode served as a continuation of the season premiere, in which local news anchor Diane Simmons was killed after being shot with a sniper rifle by Stewie, after she had killed several other secondary characters. News anchor Joyce Kinney was brought in as a replacement for Simmons on the local news, alongside Tom Tucker. The character is voiced by actress Christine Lakin, who has guest starred in various roles throughout the course of the series.

In addition to the regular cast, former series writer and The Cleveland Show writer Kirker Butler, actor Colin Ford, actress Christine Lakin, voice actress Rachael MacFarlane (sister of series creator and executive producer Seth MacFarlane), singer Helen Reddy, and actress Jennifer Tilly guest starred in the episode. Recurring guest voice actors Ralph Garman, writer Chris Sheridan, writer Danny Smith, episode writer Alec Sulkin and writer John Viener made minor appearances throughout the episode.

== Cultural references ==
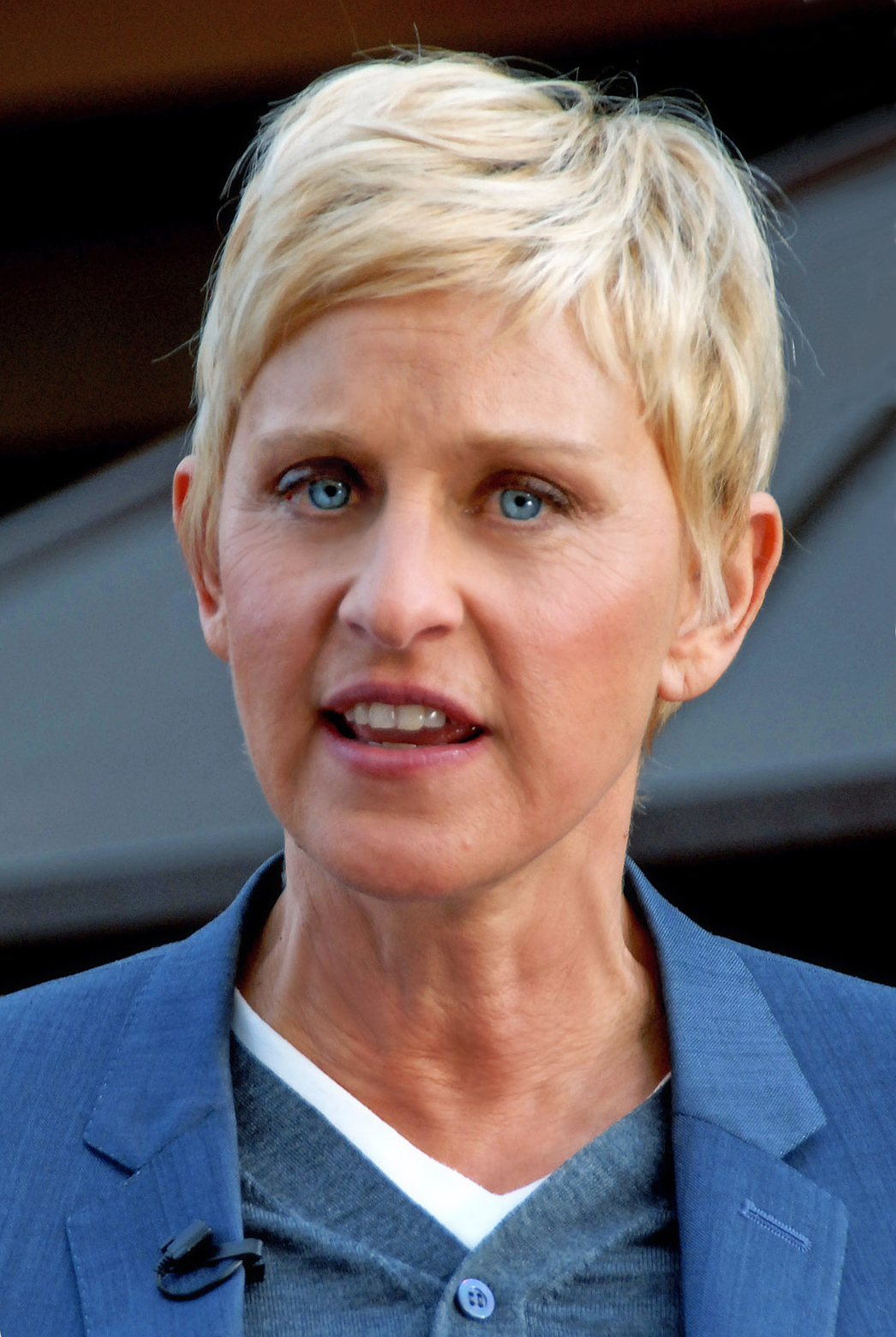
Actress and comedian Ellen DeGeneres was parodied in the episode.

In the opening scene of the episode, instead of the usual theme song, a sequence similar to that of the 1977 CBS series The Incredible Hulk is played, with Stewie portraying Bruce Banner, Tom Tucker portraying Mr. McGee, and Peter portraying Hulk. After Lois meets Joyce Kinney at the local supermarket, the two decide to meet up at the news studio later that evening. Admitting her enjoyment of their friendship, Lois continually praises Joyce for her celebrity status, calling her as much of a bigshot as The Muppets character Miss Piggy. The scene then cuts to Kermit the Frog, who has been badly beaten, with Fozzie Bear approaching him about a proposed "Bears in Space" number. Kermit then reveals that the skit has been changed to "Pigs in Space" instead.

Returning home, the Griffin family are shown to be watching the syndicated talk show The Ellen DeGeneres Show with actress and comedian Ellen DeGeneres appearing as host of the show. Lois then interrupts the family, and announces that she is going out to drink with Joyce. The two then share their darkest secrets, with Lois revealing that she had participated in the making of a pornographic film. Asked if the film still exists, Lois states that it is "long gone," just like the original ending to the 1978 musical film Grease. Joyce's original surname, Chevapravatdumrong, is a reference to Family Guy writer and producer Cherry Chevapravatdumrong; in light of this, Joyce explains that she changed her surname to Kinney as "they'd never let that name on TV". The scene then transitions into a Facebook cutaway gag, showing Lois's Facebook profile. Becoming depressed once she is kicked out of her church, Lois is confronted by Brian, who suggest that she take the criticism head on, giving the example of television host Ryan Seacrest taking on jokes about his alleged homosexuality.

== Reception ==
"And I'm Joyce Kinney" was broadcast on January 16, 2011, as a part of an animated television night on Fox, and was preceded by American Dad!, The Simpsons and the second episode of the animated series Bob's Burgers. It was followed by Family Guy creator and executive producer Seth MacFarlane's spin-off, The Cleveland Show. Family Guy was watched by 7.08 million viewers, according to Nielsen ratings, despite airing simultaneously with Desperate Housewives on ABC, Undercover Boss on CBS and the Golden Globe Awards on NBC. The episode also acquired a 3.7 rating in the 18–49 demographic, beating American Dad!, The Simpsons, Bob's Burgers and The Cleveland Show, in addition to significantly edging out all four shows in total viewership. The episode's ratings decreased significantly from the previous week's episode, largely due to the lead-in that had been provided by the NFL Wild Card game that preceded the "Animation Domination" line-up.

Television critics reacted with mixed reaction toward the episode, with one critic calling the storyline "pretty dull." In a simultaneous review of the episodes of American Dad!, The Simpsons and Bob's Burgers that preceded the show, and the episode of The Cleveland Show that followed it, The A.V. Club's Rowan Kaiser wrote, "I don't have much to say about tonight's Family Guy. Last week, we had some comments about how Family Guy seems to be willing to play with its format this season. That didn't happen this week at all." Kaiser went on to criticize the flashback involving Lois and Joyce in high school, stating, "Having a previously unknown flashback as the big reveal feels like cheating, if you're inclined to view Family Guy as consistent." She concluded her review by praising "the burning bush" joke, and ultimately gave the episode a C− rating, the worst rating of the night. It was beaten by the American Dad! episode "Fart-Break Hotel", The Cleveland Show episode "How Do You Solve a Problem Like Roberta?", The Simpsons episode "Flaming Moe", and the Bob's Burgers episode "Crawl Space". In a slightly more positive review of the episode, Jason Hughes of TV Squad praised the episode for some of its "silly side jokes," but felt disappointed by the ending to the show, commenting, "it didn't follow any real logic [...] It was an easy way out, as if they'd written themselves into a corner." Hughes also criticized the episode for its dependence on cutaway gags, writing, "at least there were some funnier moments in this one. Unfortunately, a lot of those came in the cutaways. And I thought we were starting to move away from a dependence on them." Hughes went on to comment that he felt confused by Stewie possibly being fathered by a porn star, adding that "it would be far more likely that Chris or Meg was fathered by the porn star."

The episode was among four other episodes submitted by the Family Guy production team for consideration of an Emmy Award nomination, in the Primetime Emmy Award for Outstanding Comedy Series category. "And I'm Joyce Kinney" was submitted, along with "Halloween on Spooner Street", "Road to the North Pole", "New Kidney in Town" and "Trading Places". The series was successfully nominated in 2009, but failed to merit an award. Mark Hentemann, executive producer and showrunner of Family Guy said of the nominating process, "We had internal discussions in the writers' room, and it seemed like we were much more akin to the other primetime comedies than we were to children's shows in animation. We assumed we would not get anywhere, and so it was a great surprise when we got the nomination."
