= New Kidney in Town =

- Family Guy episode
- Episode no.: Season 9 Episode 8
- Directed by: Pete Michels
- Written by: Matt Harrigan; Dave Willis
- Production code: 8ACX10
- Original air date: January 9, 2011

Guest appearances
- Yvette Nicole Brown as the black nurse; Drew Carey as himself; Gary Cole as Principal Shepherd; Christine Lakin as Joyce Kinney; Rachael MacFarlane as Charlotte

Episode chronology
| ← Previous "Road to the North Pole" | Next → "And I'm Joyce Kinney" |
- Family Guy season 9

"New Kidney in Town" is the eighth episode of the ninth season of the animated comedy series Family Guy. It originally aired on Fox in the United States on January 9, 2011. The episode follows Peter, after he drinks kerosene, causing him to suffer immediate kidney failure. In need of a replacement kidney, Peter is unable to locate a match, until it is discovered that his anthropomorphic dog Brian is a match, but would require the donation of both his kidneys. Meanwhile, Chris is instructed by his English teacher to write an essay about hope, in preparation of United States President Barack Obama's appearance at their school. Unable to write anything inspiring, he decides to pick his sister Meg's brain and use her ideas.

The episode was written by Matt Harrigan and Dave Willis, and directed by Pete Michels. It received mostly positive reviews from critics for its storyline and many cultural references. According to Nielsen ratings, it was viewed in 9.29 million homes in its original airing. The episode featured guest performances by Yvette Nicole Brown, Drew Carey, Gary Cole, Christine Lakin and Rachael MacFarlane, along with several recurring guest voice actors for the series. "New Kidney in Town" was one of five episodes submitted for consideration for an Emmy Award in the "Outstanding Comedy Series" category in 2011.

== Plot ==
At the Drunken Clam, Peter is introduced to Red Bull by Quagmire. He ends up becoming highly addicted to it and it makes him operate at high speeds. Peter buys packs of Red Bull and introduces it to his family, though things get out of hand as soon as he starts performing everything too fast. One day, Peter comes home to find that Lois has dumped out the Red Bull in an attempt to make Peter give up his new addiction. An angered Peter attempts to make his own in retaliation. Because of a misreading, Peter decides to put kerosene in his beverage believing that fuel causes the effect Red Bull caused him. Brian warns Peter that kerosene is dangerous, but Peter ignores him and drinks it, causing him to collapse on the floor.

The family learns that Peter has been diagnosed with kidney failure due to the damage done and he is in need of a transplant. However, since they must wait a few months before they can get donors, Peter must undergo dialysis at regular intervals. After three weeks of constant dialysis procedures, Peter gets angry that the dialysis treatments have taken up his life. He is convinced by Joe and Quagmire to skip one treatment, assured it would not hurt him at all, but is quickly proven wrong when he becomes jaundiced and vomits blood.

Back again at the hospital, the family learns that Peter's condition has a high chance of killing him instantly, and that the only other option aside from the daily procedures is that one must give up one of their kidneys to Peter. Lois volunteers to give up one of hers, but is informed that she is not a match, and she refuses Dr. Hartman's suggestion of volunteering one of the kids. Brian then volunteers, and they discover that he has the same kidney type as Peter. However, as dog kidneys are smaller than a human's, two would need to be donated to have a small chance at being successful, meaning the procedure would kill Brian, and could kill Peter too if unsuccessful. However, Brian decides to go along with the procedure to save Peter's life. Unwilling to lose Brian, Stewie kidnaps him and takes him to the local playground, in hopes of staying there for the rest of their lives. Brian convinces Stewie to let him go, stating that Stewie can live without a dog but not without a father. The next day, Brian and Peter prepare to undergo the kidney transfer. However, Hartman reveals that he himself is a match for Peter and has decided to donate one of his own kidneys, which would be a more guaranteed success. Brian's life is spared and Peter is saved.

Meanwhile, at the same time during the kidney crisis, United States President Barack Obama has decided to visit Quahog, and Chris' entire English class is assigned to write an essay about hope. He consults his sister Meg for her opinion and she lists her personal opinion on the subject, which Chris plagiarizes. Meg is angry that he decided to take her words and call them his own, but she is eventually given credit for co-writing the speech, and she and Chris introduce Obama to the school where he begins singing and playing the guitar as students swoon over his performance.

== Production and development ==
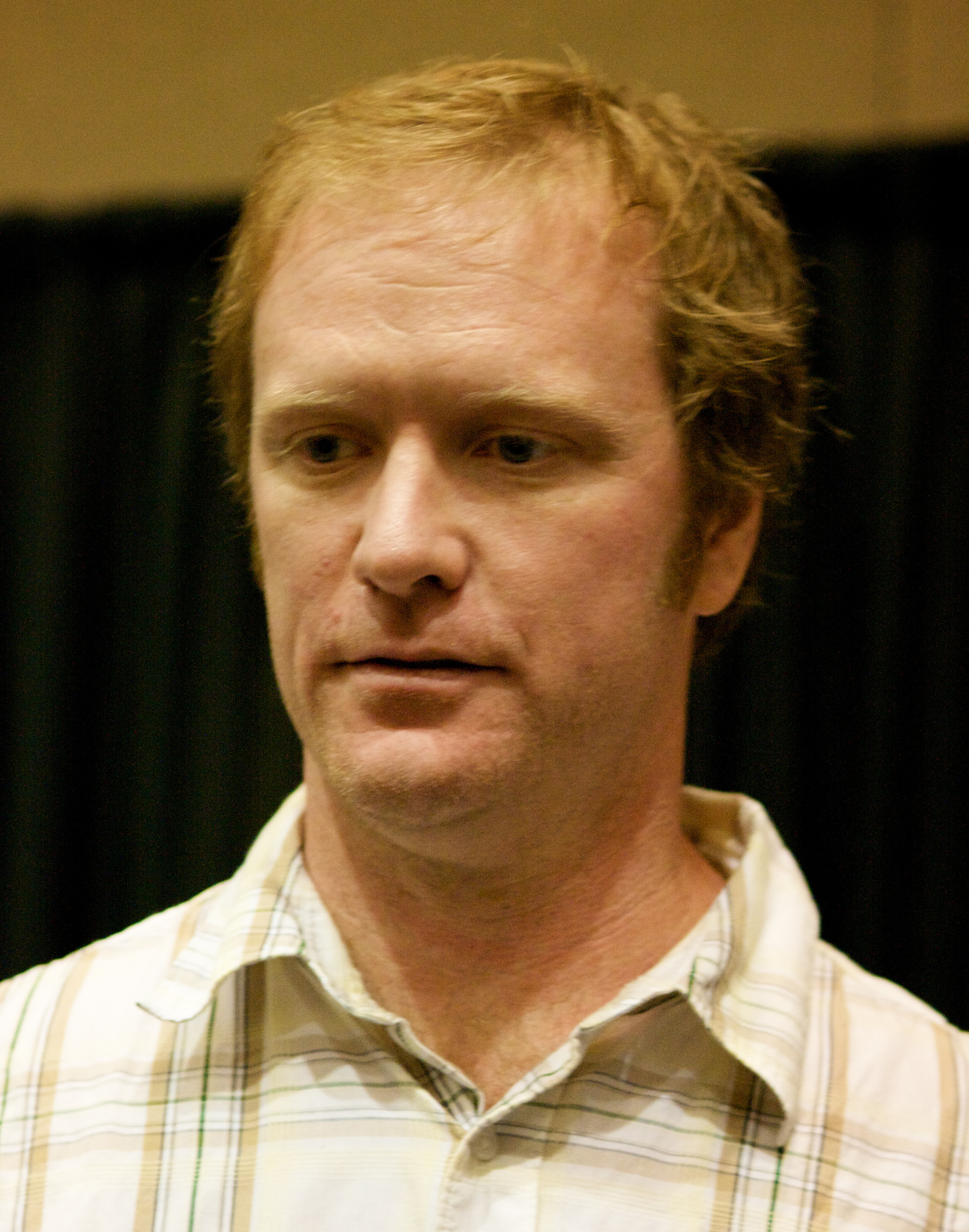
Dave Willis co-wrote the episode with Matt Harrigan.

"New Kidney in Town" was co-written by Williams Street writers Dave Willis and Matt Harrigan, in their first official episode for the series. The two have also worked for Aqua Teen Hunger Force, Space Ghost Coast to Coast, and Squidbillies, among others. The episode was directed by series regular Pete Michels, shortly after the conclusion of the eighth production season, in his first episode for the season. Series veterans Peter Shin and James Purdum, both of whom having previously served as animation directors, served as supervising directors for the episode, with Alex Carter, Andrew Goldberg, Elaine Ko, Spencer Porter and Aaron Blitzstein serving as staff writers for the episode. Composer Walter Murphy, who has worked on the series since its inception, returned to compose the music for "New Kidney in Town".

In addition to the regular cast, actress Yvette Nicole Brown, actor, comedian and game show host Drew Carey, actor Gary Cole, actress Christine Lakin and voice actress Rachael MacFarlane, sister of series creator and executive producer Seth MacFarlane, guest starred in the episode. Recurring guest voice actors John G. Brennan, actor Ralph Garman, writer Danny Smith and writer John Viener made minor appearances in the episode.

== Cultural references ==
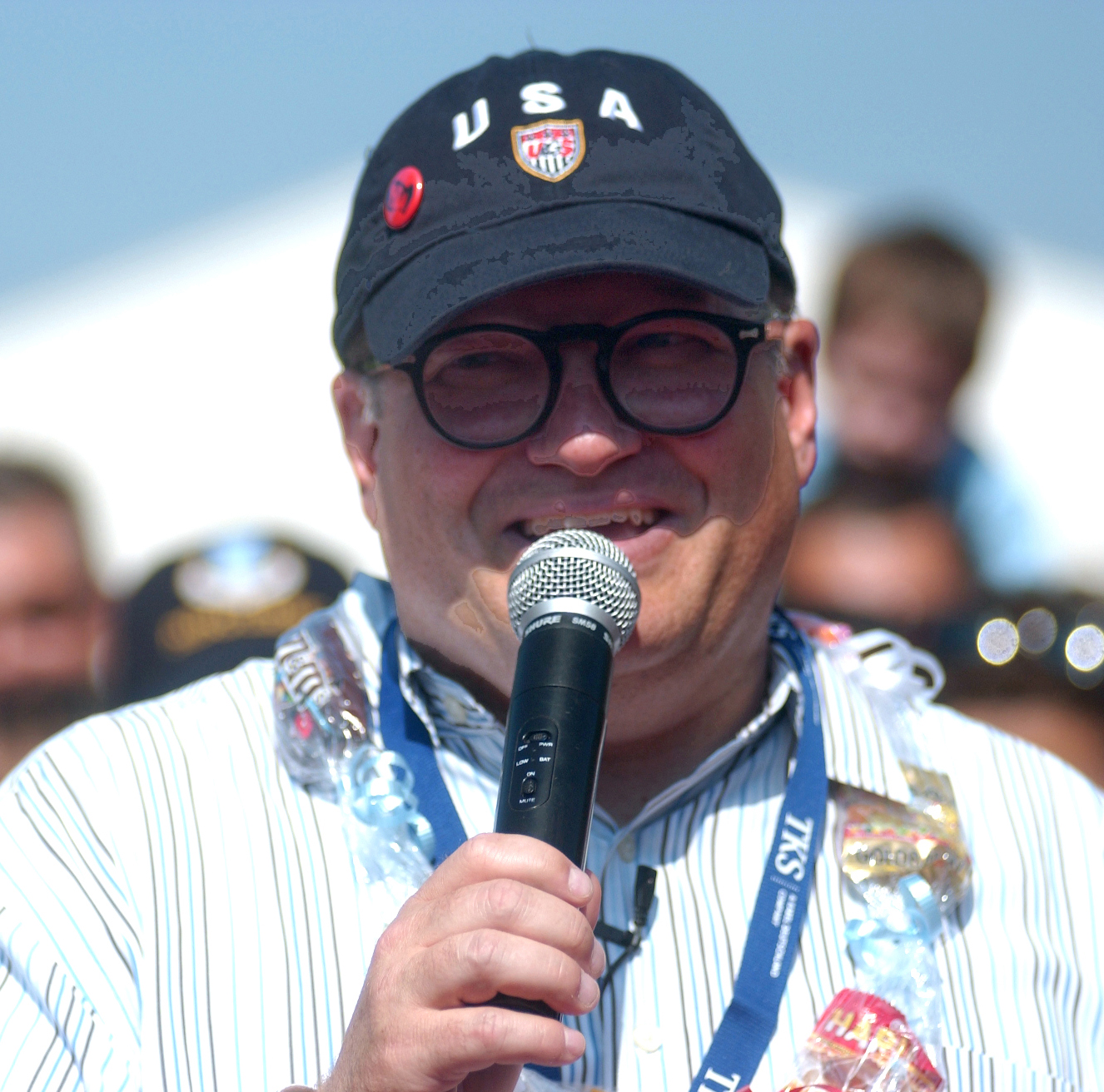
Comedian and game show host Drew Carey appeared in the episode.

In the opening scene of the episode, after complaining of being exhausted, Peter is introduced to the energy drink Red Bull by his friends, Quagmire and Joe. He then suddenly becomes extremely hyperactive, and begins singing the 1998 single "Ray of Light" by singer-songwriter Madonna in a parody of the high speed time-lapse of its video. Peter also goes on to appear on the American game show The Price Is Right, with actor and comedian Drew Carey appearing as host. He then begins playing the Showcase Showdown game, until the wheel suddenly spins off its axis and into the audience, running over several rows of people. After suffering from Red Bull withdrawal, Peter decides to create his own concoction, including kerosene. After drinking it, he suffers from immediate kidney failure, requiring constant dialysis. Deciding to go to The Drunken Clam with Quagmire and Joe, he is reluctant to go to his scheduled dialysis appointment, in order to watch the 1984 CBS series Charles in Charge.

In preparation for a special appearance at their school, James Woods High School, Chris is assigned to write an essay about "hope" to welcome United States President Barack Obama. After reading his essay to the entire school, along with his sister, Meg, President Barack Obama, dressed similarly to Conrad Birdie as portrayed in the film version of the musical, begins singing and playing guitar in the school's auditorium. Obama then performs the song "Honestly Sincere" from the stage musical and film Bye Bye Birdie.

== Reception ==
"New Kidney in Town" was broadcast on January 9, 2011, as a part of an animated television night on Fox, and was preceded by The Simpsons and the series premiere of the animated series Bob's Burgers, and followed by Family Guy creator and executive producer Seth MacFarlane's spin-off, The Cleveland Show. It was watched by 9.29 million viewers, according to Nielsen ratings, despite airing simultaneously with Desperate Housewives on ABC, Undercover Boss on CBS and The Cape on NBC. The episode also acquired a 4.7 rating in the 18–49 demographic, beating Bob's Burgers and The Cleveland Show in addition to significantly edging out the latter in total viewership. The episode's ratings increased significantly from the previous episode, largely due to the lead-in provided by the NFL Wild Card game that preceded the "Animation Domination" line-up.

Television critics reacted mostly positive toward the episode, calling the storyline "heartfelt." In a simultaneous review of the episodes of The Simpsons and The Cleveland Show that preceded and followed the show, respectively, The A.V. Club's Rowan Kaiser wrote, "I spent the entire time expecting the rug to be pulled out and the whole thing revealed to be Seth MacFarlane just trying to manipulate my emotions." Kaiser went on to compliment series creator and executive producer Seth MacFarlane, stating "some of the more recent formal experiments that the show has done, such as the hour-long murder mystery in this season's premiere, indicate that MacFarlane and company agree with the criticism." She concluded her review by writing, "I have to give props to Family Guy for going outside their wheelhouse without winking excessively at their audience, but I think it may have been a little bit too far to be truly great." Kaiser ultimately gave the episode a B rating, the best rating of the night, beating The Cleveland Show episode "Ain't Nothin' But Mutton Bustin'" and The Simpsons episode "Moms I'd Like to Forget". In another positive review of the episode, Jason Hughes of TV Squad praised the episode's "funniest moments," which included the opening sequence involving Peter and the Red Bull, as well as the reference to The Price Is Right. Hughes went on to comment that the episode "taught us about the depths and bonds of love that make a family. Whether it's acceptance, hope or sacrifice, there's no limit to what we will do for family." Kate Moon of TV Fanatic also commented positively on the episode, writing in her review of the storyline, "Overall, I found the installment to be refreshing with everyone taking a part in Peter’s dilemma. It was actually sweet and emotional for a change." Moon also praised the scenes involving President Obama, and Stewie's attempt at saving Brian.

The episode was among four other episodes submitted by the Family Guy production team for consideration of an Emmy Award nomination, in the Primetime Emmy Award for Outstanding Comedy Series category. "New Kidney in Town" was submitted, along with "Halloween on Spooner Street", "Road to the North Pole", "And I'm Joyce Kinney" and "Trading Places". The series was successfully nominated in 2009, but failed to merit an award. Mark Hentemann, executive producer and showrunner of Family Guy, said of the nominating process, "We had internal discussions in the writers' room, and it seemed like we were much more akin to the other primetime comedies than we were to children's shows in animation. We assumed we would not get anywhere, and so it was a great surprise when we got the nomination."
