= Trading Places (Family Guy) =

- Family Guy episode
- Episode no.: Season 9 Episode 13
- Directed by: Joseph Lee
- Written by: Steve Callaghan
- Production code: 8ACX17
- Original air date: March 20, 2011

Guest appearances
- Gary Cole as Principal Shepherd; Nina Dobrev as Gina; Carrie Fisher as Angela; Rachael MacFarlane as Amber; Laura Vandervoort as Third Bully Girl; Lisa Wilhoit as Connie D'Amico

Episode chronology
← Previous "The Hand That Rocks the Wheelchair"	Next → "Tiegs for Two"
- Family Guy season 9

"Trading Places" is the 13th episode of the ninth season of the animated comedy series Family Guy. It originally aired on Fox in the United States on March 20, 2011. The episode follows the Griffins as they decide to switch roles, in order to teach each other a lesson about responsibility, with father Peter and mother Lois becoming the children, and son Chris and daughter Meg becoming the parents of the household. They each discover hardships in their new roles, however, as the switch causes a strain on the family's relationship, and eventually resulting in the ultimate consequence.

The episode was written by Steve Callaghan and directed by Joseph Lee. It received mostly positive reviews from critics for its storyline and many cultural references. According to Nielsen ratings, it was viewed in 6.55 million homes in its original airing. The episode featured guest performances by Gary Cole, Carrie Fisher, Rachael MacFarlane, Laura Vandervoort, Lisa Wilhoit, and Nina Dobrev, along with several recurring guest voice actors for the series. "Trading Places" was one of five episodes submitted for consideration for an Emmy Award in the "Outstanding Comedy Series" category in 2011.

== Plot ==
A drunk Tom Tucker appears on television, announcing a contest to win a dirtbike. Peter decides to enter the contest, in which the person who keeps their hand on the bike the longest wins. As time goes on, competitors continually begin to give up. Nine hours later, the last two contestants remaining are Peter and Mayor Adam West, the latter of whom is tricked into taking his hand off the bike when Peter sends him a text message with his free hand. The next day, Peter's children, Chris and Meg decide to get on the bike and take it for a ride through Quahog. Daring Meg he can jump over a fire hydrant, Chris suddenly crashes the bike, completely destroying it. Once Peter and Lois discover this, the ensuing argument leads to both parents and children questioning who has it harder, and they switch roles in the family for a week. Meg and Chris then become the parents, dressing more conservatively, with Meg doing housework and Chris going to the brewery where their father works, and Lois and Peter begin attending high school.

Peter and Lois undergo constant hard school work beyond their generation, as well as having to deal with bullies and constantly keep up a social status. Meanwhile, Meg and Chris find adult work to be very easy to handle. Meg finishes the housework in under an hour and proves to be an exceptional cook, while Chris accomplishes a great deal of work Peter had previously been slacking off in. His stellar work ethic impresses Peter's boss, Angela, who offers him a raise. A few days later, when Lois and Peter admit that they are suffering and being bullied in school and want to call off the role switching, Meg agrees to go back to school but Chris refuses on the grounds he has been hired at the brewery as Peter's replacement and is now the sole breadwinner. While Peter attempts to find a new job, Chris begins working overtime at the brewery. Becoming exhausted by work, Chris begins drinking, and taking his anger and frustration out on the family, and eventually suffers a heart attack. Realizing that being an adult is just as hard as being a child after recovering in the hospital, Chris agrees to go back to the way things used to be, and the family goes back to normal.

== Production and development ==
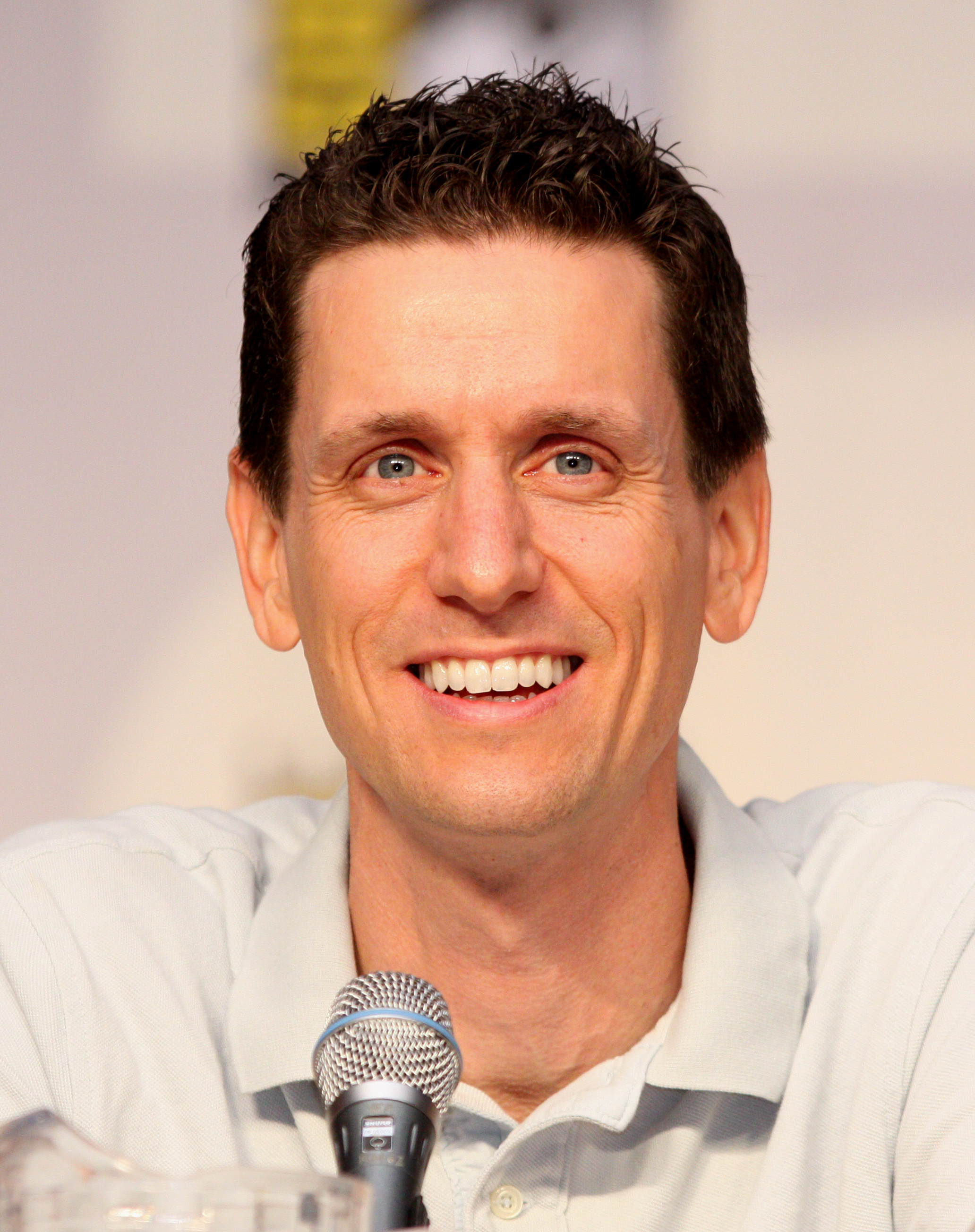
Steve Callaghan wrote the episode.

The episode was written by series regular, executive producer and showrunner Steve Callaghan, and directed by series regular Joseph Lee during the course of the ninth production season. Series veterans Peter Shin and James Purdum, both of whom having previously served as animation directors, served as supervising directors for the episode, with Andrew Goldberg, Alex Carter, Elaine Ko, Spencer Porter and Aaron Blitzstein serving as staff writers for the episode. Composer Ron Jones, who has worked on the series since its inception, returned to compose the music for "Trading Places".

In addition to the regular cast, actor Gary Cole, actress Nina Dobrev, actress Carrie Fisher, voice actress Rachael MacFarlane, actress Laura Vandervoort, and voice actress Lisa Wilhoit guest starred in the episode. Recurring guest voice actors and writers Steve Callaghan, Danny Smith, Alec Sulkin and John Viener also made minor appearances. Actor Adam West appeared in the episode as well.

== Cultural references ==
When the family agrees to switch roles for one week Peter mentions the movie Criss-Cross. He goes on to mention Face/Off and Roadhouse (both of which have nothing to do with the current situation). When Peter enters the kitchen in a dress (as "Meg") Lois reminds him that he is supposed to switch roles, not genders. He returns with a pump-action shotgun and dressed up as a Trench-Coat Mafia member and saying "Time to make all those popular kids pay for ignoring me," referencing Columbine – he is even shown entering the scene with a sawn-off shotgun similar to the one used in the massacre. Chris compares his high school's hierarchical structure to Lord of the Flies.

The title is a reference to the film Trading Places, in which Dan Aykroyd and Eddie Murphy have their lives swapped around in attempt to resolve a wager on the significance of someone's upbringing vs their genes (nature vs nurture) in determining what kind of person they become.

== Reception ==
The episode was watched by 6.55 million viewers according to Nielsen ratings.

Rowan Kaiser of The A.V. Club gave "Trading Places" a mostly positive review, calling it "relatively entertaining", and stating that the moral of the episode "surprisingly felt earned, if cliché". She also praised the episode for giving Chris and Meg "more to do than just be punching bags for annoying jokes". She rated "Trading Places" a B. Jason Hughes of TV Squad was more critical of the episode, complaining about the lack of original ideas. However, he also praised the characterization of Chris and Meg, writing that he enjoyed "seeing Meg step up as a character and be more than the butt of her family's hatred" and "Seth Green was absolutely hilarious during Chris's psychological breakdown leading up to his heart attack".

The episode was among four other episodes submitted by the Family Guy production team for consideration of an Emmy Award nomination, in the Primetime Emmy Award for Outstanding Comedy Series category. "Trading Places" was submitted, along with "Halloween on Spooner Street", "Road to the North Pole", "New Kidney in Town" and "And I'm Joyce Kinney". The series was successfully nominated in 2009, but failed to merit an award. Mark Hentemann, executive producer and showrunner of Family Guy said of the nominating process, "We had internal discussions in the writers' room, and it seemed like we were much more akin to the other primetime comedies than we were to children's shows in animation. We assumed we would not get anywhere, and so it was a great surprise when we got the nomination."
