= The Tan Aquatic with Steve Zissou =

- Family Guy episode
- Episode no.: Season 5 Episode 11
- Directed by: Julius Wu
- Written by: Mark Hentemann
- Production code: 5ACX06
- Original air date: February 18, 2007

Guest appearances
- Credited: Mike Barker as Devon; Jeff Bergman as Martin Landau; Chris Cox as Randy Fulcher; Michael Clarke Duncan as Fozzie Bear; Keir Gilchrist as Kyle; Beth Littleford as Kyle's Mom; Rachael MacFarlane as Britney Spears; Uncredited: Alex Breckenridge as Misty Fogbank (deleted scenes)

Episode chronology
← Previous "Peter's Two Dads"	Next → "Airport '07"
- Family Guy season 5

"The Tan Aquatic with Steve Zissou" is the eleventh episode of the fifth season of Family Guy, which originally aired on Fox on February 18, 2007. The episode follows Stewie, who develops a tan, but becomes obsessed with his new look and attempts to keep it, eventually stopping after being told by a doctor that he may now have cancer. Meanwhile, Peter discovers Chris being tormented by a bully, and after a series of events, becomes a bully himself.

The episode was written by Mark Hentemann and directed by Julius Wu. It received mostly mixed reviews from critics for its storyline and many cultural references. According to Nielsen ratings, it was viewed in 8.53 million homes in its original airing. The episode featured guest performances by Mike Barker, Jeff Bergman, Chris Cox, Michael Clarke Duncan, Keir Gilchrist, Beth Littleford and Rachael MacFarlane, along with several recurring guest voice actors for the series.

== Plot ==
While babysitting Stewie, Peter takes him along on an all day golf game and Stewie ends up with a tan all over his body. Stewie decides he likes being tanned and begins frequently to use a tanning bed in his room. He also holds a party for tanned people only. Stewie tells Brian to wake him up after fifteen minutes of tanning but Brian falls asleep and wakes up six and a half hours later. Stewie is extremely sunburned, barely able to move and in great pain. When Stewie eventually begins to peel, Brian spots a mole on Stewie's stomach. Convinced it is skin cancer, Stewie begins to live out his dying wishes with Brian forced to help him since it was partially his fault he caused the cancer in the first place (though Stewie solely blames him). One of Stewie's requests was to visit the Chicago Museum of Art. As his last request he has Brian record his final thoughts. In the end, Stewie hears from Dr. Hartman that he does not have cancer and gives up tanning. Stewie then sees that Brian drew himself being hanged instead of his final thoughts, prompting him to quip "Oh, you are just the worst type of person".

Meanwhile, Chris learns that his best customer, Herbert, has made Kyle, a neighbor's son and a bully, his new paper boy. Chris decides to confront them both, but ends up getting pushed over by Kyle and laughed at by Kyle's friends and subsequently returning home much to Peter and Lois' concern. Peter goes to talk with Kyle who mocks and makes fun of him repeatedly. Unable to control his anger toward Kyle, Peter violently beats him up, leaving him bleeding and bruised. Eventually, Lois finds out and they go apologize the next day. Kyle's mother, Claire, agrees not to press charges if Peter apologizes to Kyle which he reluctantly does. Kyle easily forgives him, saying he would have done the same and comments on how good bullying makes you feel, encouraging Peter to become a bully. Peter splashes a pot of boiling water over Lois and makes her punch herself in the face. He also hits Stewie on his sunburned buttocks, knocks Chris out of his chair, and sticks his large butt out at Meg to fart repeatedly in her face following her backward movements around the kitchen table until she finally trips and vomits on the floor at which Peter gets mad with her. When Peter also bullies his friends, such as using Joe as a marionette and pulling Cleveland's pants down, Lois points out that he is as bad as his old school bully, Randy Fulcher. Deciding he should bully him instead, Peter finds Randy who is now suffering from multiple sclerosis. Thinking, when Randy says "I have MS", that he is bragging that he has a monkey's scrotum, Peter is about to beat up Randy but is stopped by Chris who beats Peter up instead and finally convinces him bullying is wrong. As the event is witnessed by a wrong sounding Kermit the Frog, and a wrong sounding Swedish Chef, a wrong sounding Fozzie Bear (voiced by Michael Clarke Duncan) asks them if they want to hear a joke as the episode ends.

== Production ==
David Goodman comments, regarding the plot partially following Herbert that "there is always a bit of trouble pitching a Herbert storyline to the network." Samm Levine had originally been selected to voice Kyle, but the character was recast because, as show producer Seth MacFarlane comments, "it seemed a lot funnier when Peter was beating up a kid if he was younger and more defenseless." A deleted scene had been made which showed Chris asking for money and stating "I spent my last ten bucks on a ham costume", and Peter replying with "it's just sitting there right now, but you know what the great thing is, it's just three months until Halloween and I am done." Peter's ancestor shown preparing to wrestle with a kangaroo was described by Seth MacFarlane to be "a very strange gag", which was added after the other parts of the episode had been created. Quagmire's profanity-laced tirade during the golf game was bleeped out on TV, but uncensored on DVD. The scene of Stewie remembering the time the Griffins had a nymphomaniac from Wisconsin in their attic was edited as FOX objected to the sounds of the woman having an orgasm being shown over a shot of a wide-awake Stewie.

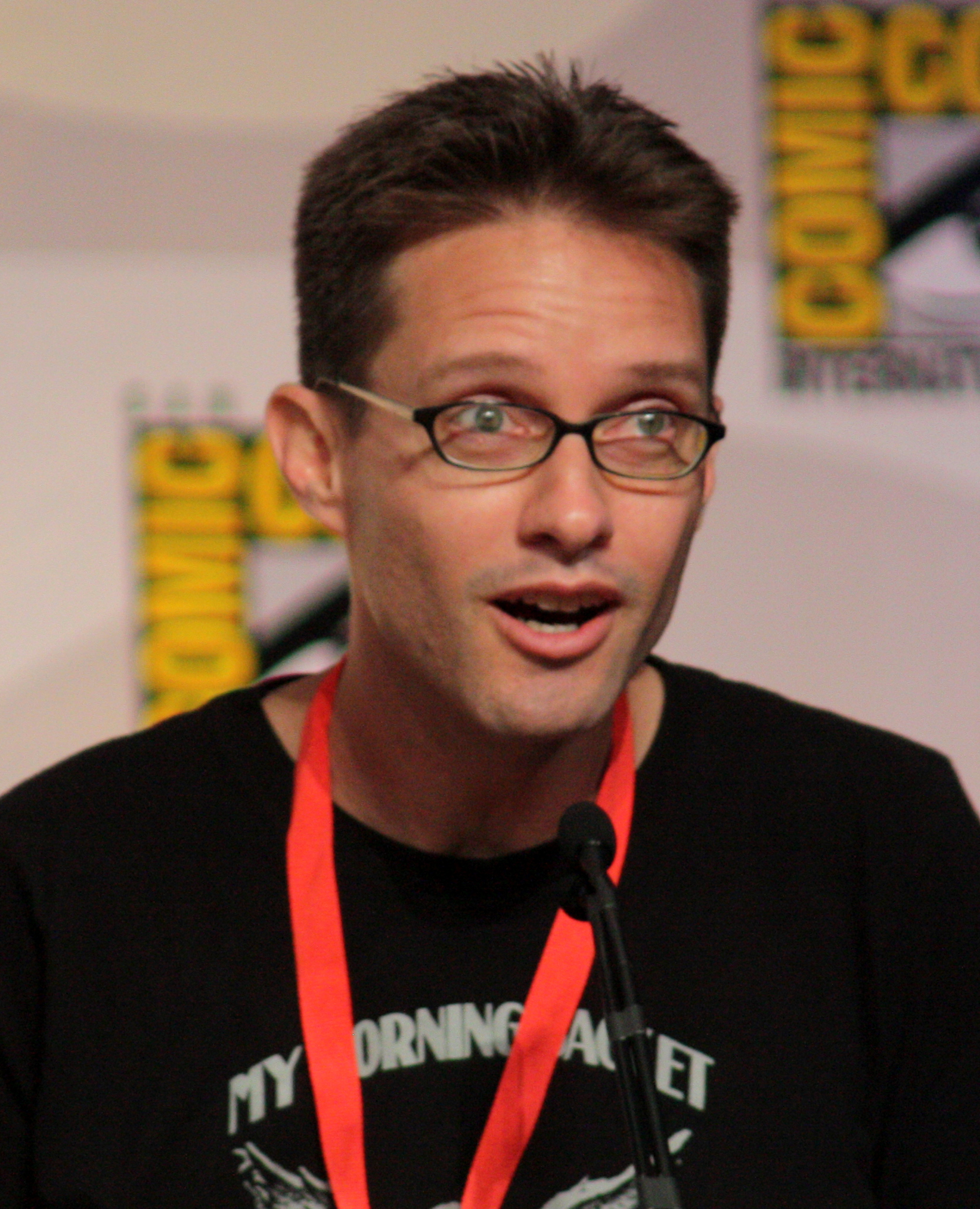
American Dad! producer Mike Barker returned as a guest voice actor.

The voice of a guest at the tanning-party which Stewie is hosting was provided by Mike Barker. David A. Goodman comments on the DVD commentary that "It's nice to hear Mike Barker back on Family Guy.", as Barker had performed multiple voices of characters in previous episodes. Peter asking "I'm going to prison, aren't I?" when hiding in the tree after beating up Chris's bully caused a little bit of trouble for the show, though it was never edited when aired on TV. A sketch had been created showing Brian falling asleep when watching Late Night with Bib Fortuna while Stewie was still in the tanning booth, but it did not seem good enough to air, so it was never broadcast. When Stewie is being sprayed by Brian with sun-screen, Ralph Furley enters the room and mistakenly thinks he sees Brian ejaculating on Stewie. The cream was originally intended to keep squirting out of the bottle as if Brian were continuing to ejaculate despite Mr. Furley's presence, but the animation didn't look right and was removed. MacFarlane comments that he was amazed that broadcasting standards allowed them to get away with the scene, even though Brian's line, "This isn't what it looks like" was edited to keep the ejaculation illusion from being blatant (the TV version goes from Mr. Furley yelling, "Brian" and Brian reacting to Mr. Furley running out and saying, "Never mind, I'll come back later!"). A deleted scene was made and designed to happen directly after Peter sickens Meg by farting in her face in which Peter steals Chris's lunch money and runs for the bus. The gag showing Dick Cheney as a Wal-Mart greeter had Cheney's greeting, "Go fuck yourself" bleeped out on TV, but not DVD. Peter falling to the ground after being pushed away from hitting Randy by Chris was very difficult to do, as it is difficult to do slow-motion in animation. The DVD version includes an extra scene in the car, in which Peter shows Chris how he looks like an anus by wearing a hoodie, pulling the hood on the drawstring tight around his mouth, and pushing a chocolate candy bar out of the hole to simulate defecation.

In addition to Barker and the regular cast, actor Jeff Bergman, voice actor Chris Cox, actor Michael Clarke Duncan, actor Keir Gilchrist, actress Beth Littleford and voice actress Rachael MacFarlane guest starred in the episode. Recurring guest voice actors Chris Sheridan, writer Danny Smith, writer Alec Sulkin and writer John Viener made minor appearances. Actor Patrick Warburton also has a guest appearance as well.

== Cultural references ==
- Stewie is listening to the instrumental version of "I Say A Little Prayer" while tanning.
- An unused ending to the episode had been similar to the ending of 1984 American comedy film Revenge of the Nerds, but "it never really clicked", hence, it was not broadcast.
- Stewie at a party with other tan-obsessed people is a reference to the Tony Lacey scene in Annie Hall.
- Stewie reciting a poem he wrote to Brian is a reference to non-fiction novel Tuesdays with Morrie.
- While Peter is confronting Kyle, Kyle begins imitating Peter's voice in a childish way. Peter replies to this by saying that Kyle makes him sound like Michael Stipe: The then-lead singer of rock band R.E.M.
- Stewie and Brian visiting the Art Institute of Chicago as one of Stewie's last wishes is a reference to Ferris Bueller's Day Off.
- There is a dispute between Peter and Lois in regards to how different Lego is from Mega Bloks.
- While Stewie is tanning, he begins to sing his own version of the song "Kokomo" by The Beach Boys.
- A parody of Kellogg's Frosted Flakes' Tony the Tiger called Terry the Tiger is seen in the Griffin kitchen, saying "They're food!"
- When Lois notices Stewie's sunburn, she tells Peter that it was similar to the time he fed his Mogwai after midnight. A cutaway scene shows Peter feeding the Mogwai a chicken leg, causing it to turn into Fran Drescher, whose head Peter then microwaves.
- When Lois wipes off Stewie's fake pencil mustache, Stewie compares the saliva being cleaned on his upper lip to the time he had dinner with Martin Landau. A cutaway shows Martin Landau having a distinct speech pattern by not chewing up his food as he speaks.
- When Brian advises Stewie to "wait and see" whether or not he has cancer, Stewie says "Jim Henson had a wait and see attitude, and look what happened to him. Now we've got wrong-sounding Muppets", a reference to Henson's deadly Streptococcus pneumoniae infection that was discovered too late which led to his death in 1990. The scene then cuts to Kermit the Frog and the Swedish Chef in a dialogue sequence, with much different voice tones. The two would later appear again at the end of the show, discussing the preceding events, when Fozzie Bear walks in, and says in a deep voice (supplied by actor Michael Clarke Duncan): "Wocka wocka. Who wants to hear a funny-ass joke?"
- When Peter realizes that he should bully Randy Fulcher, he compares this to Dick Cheney being a Wal-Mart greeter. He greets each customer with "Go fuck yourself", a reference to a 2004 incident where he said those words to Senator Patrick Leahy, after he asked the vice president about Halliburton's alleged war profiteering.
- When Stewie gets off his beach chair during a tan, Stewie is seen drinking a can of TaB, and then slowly looking to the camera – a parody of TaB commercials in the '80s.
- The title of the episode "The Tan Aquatic with Steve Zissou" is a reference to the 2004 Wes Anderson movie The Life Aquatic with Steve Zissou.

== Reception ==
In a significant improvement over the previous week, the episode was viewed in 8.53 million homes in its original airing, according to Nielsen ratings. The episode also acquired a 3.0 rating in the 18–49 demographic, being slightly edged out by The Simpsons, while still winning over American Dad! and King of the Hill.

Ahsan Haque of IGN gave "The Tan Aquatic with Steve Zissou" a 7.4/10 and commented "the random filler jokes just don't work, especially in this episode as both Jim Henson's Muppets and Frosted Flakes' Tony the Tiger are misused as random source material for jokes that simply fail to deliver", adding that "The idea of Peter going overboard with his newfound desire to bully his family and friends is also not quite as funny as it could have been." In a negative review by Brett Love of TV Squad. he noted "[the episode] was something of the opposite of "Peter's Two Dads." Where that one excelled with the structure of the story, this one wasn't as strong.
