= The Hand That Rocks the Wheelchair =

- Family Guy episode
- Episode no.: Season 9 Episode 12
- Directed by: Brian Iles
- Written by: Tom Devanney
- Production code: 8ACX11
- Original air date: March 6, 2011

Guest appearances
- Dee Bradley Baker; Colin Ford as Kid; Patrick Stewart as Susie Swanson; Jennifer Tilly as Bonnie Swanson

Episode chronology
← Previous "German Guy"	Next → "Trading Places"
- Family Guy season 9

"The Hand That Rocks the Wheelchair" is the 12th episode of the ninth season of the animated comedy series Family Guy. It originally aired on Fox in the United States on March 6, 2011. The episode follows Meg as she attempts to look after her handicapped neighbor, Joe, after his wife, Bonnie, has to leave town temporarily to visit her ailing father. Meg soon becomes infatuated with Joe, however, causing him to become nervous, and approach Meg's parents. Meanwhile, Stewie inadvertently clones a truly evil version of himself who rampages through the fictional city of Quahog before ultimately attempting to kill Stewie and Brian.

The episode was written by Tom Devanney and directed by Brian Iles. It received mostly mixed reviews from critics for its storyline and many cultural references. According to Nielsen ratings, it was viewed in 6.32 million homes in its original airing. The episode featured guest performances by Dee Bradley Baker, Colin Ford, Patrick Stewart and Jennifer Tilly, along with several recurring guest voice actors for the series. It was first announced at the 2010 San Diego Comic-Con.

== Plot ==
While in her home, Lois is approached by Bonnie, who is looking for someone to look after Joe and their daughter, Susie, while she is out of town. Lois agrees to do so, but then gets Meg to look after them instead. The next day, Meg visits Joe and Susie, and tells them that she will be helping them out while Bonnie is gone. Joe and Meg bond on the way to school, causing Meg to develop feelings for Joe. The following morning, Meg wants to encourage Joe to like her so she makes him breakfast. Joe takes no interest in Meg, who continually tries to approach Joe throughout the rest of the day. That night, after receiving a call from Bonnie that she will be returning home, Meg travels to the airport where Bonnie is departing (Bangor International Airport), and puts one of Joe's guns into her luggage. Bonnie is arrested by airport security (inadvertently revealing that she was also smuggling cocaine), giving Meg extra time to be with Joe. Unaware that Meg has sabotaged Bonnie's travel plans, the two go to dinner, where Meg suggests that they have a baby, and then breastfeeds Susie to Joe's horror. Joe tells Lois and Peter of Meg's abnormal behavior, recalling how Brian went through the same thing. Lois questions Meg about her infatuation with Joe, telling her that the two have nothing in common. Meg waits for Joe to return home, when she jumps in front of his police car, attempting to paralyze herself in order to have a common interest. Joe takes Meg to the hospital, where it becomes clear that she will recover and not lose the use of her legs. Meg apologizes to Joe for her behavior, Joe tells her he is lucky to have her as a neighbor, and the two decide to become friends. Meg also apologizes to Bonnie, who is understanding as she experienced a similar crush around Meg's age.

Meanwhile, Brian tells Stewie that he has become soft, and has lost his evil nature. Realizing he is right, Stewie builds a machine to increase his evil, but it apparently has no effect. However, unbeknownst to him, it creates a truly evil clone of him instead (distinguishable from the real Stewie in that he wears a red shirt with yellow overalls, whereas Stewie sports a yellow shirt with red overalls). Later that day, Evil Stewie attacks Brian, trying to strangle him with his collar and shoves batteries up his nose, almost killing him. The real Stewie appears and rescues him, and when he sees the clone he realizes what has happened with the machine. Stewie wants to exploit this, but the evil clone beats him into submission, cuts off Brian's tail and forces it down Stewie's throat. Leaving both Brian and Stewie in agony, the clone goes outside and steals a car after graphically severing the driver in half with a machete (in the DVD version, he is seen torturing the boy who bullied Stewie at the beginning and killing the boy's parents before stealing the car). Attempting to capture the clone, Stewie ties Brian to a light post to act as bait. As Evil Stewie prepares to kill Brian, Stewie ambushes the clone and the two fight. Able to wriggle free, Brian grabs the clone's laser gun, but both Stewie and Evil Stewie have stripped down to their diapers during the fight, and Brian cannot tell the real Stewie from the clone. He kills the Stewie who fails to be amused by the sight of his own feet, a peculiarity of the real Stewie. As Stewie and Brian begin to walk home, Stewie turns back to the camera with a malicious grin and bright yellow cat eyes, to the sound of Vincent Price's diabolical laughter, a reference to Michael Jackson's Thriller video.

== Production and development ==
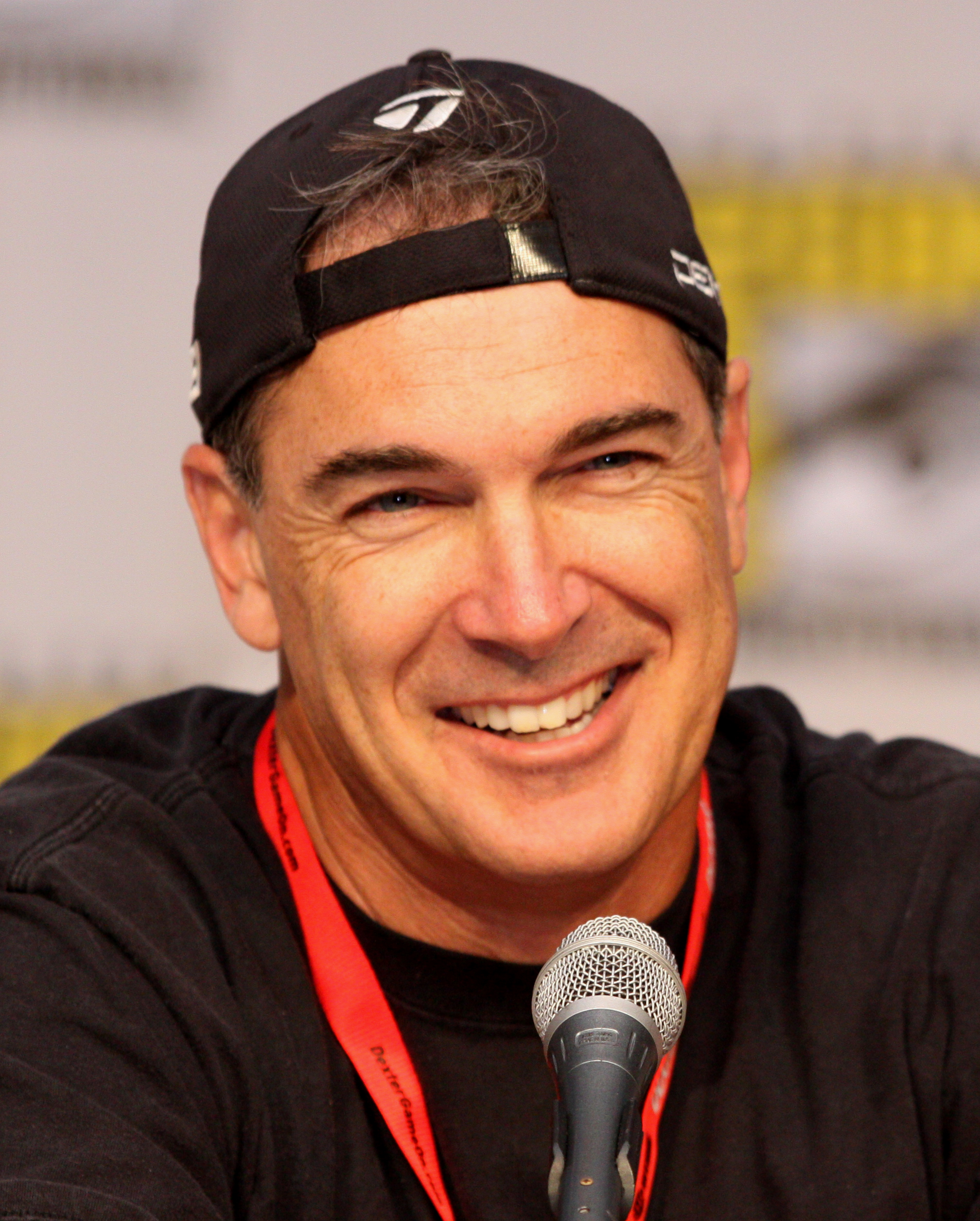
Patrick Warburton announced the episode at the 2010 San Diego Comic-Con

First announced at the 2010 San Diego Comic-Con by recurring cast member Patrick Warburton, the episode was written by series regular Tom Devanney and directed by series regular Brian Iles during the course of the ninth production season. Series veterans Peter Shin and James Purdum, both of whom having previously served as animation directors, served as supervising directors for the episode, with Andrew Goldberg, Alex Carter, Elaine Ko, Spencer Porter and Aaron Blitzstein serving as staff writers for the episode. Composer Ron Jones, who has worked on the series since its inception, returned to compose the music for "The Hand That Rocks the Wheelchair".

In addition to the regular cast, voice actor Dee Bradley Baker, actor Colin Ford, actor Patrick Stewart, and actress Jennifer Tilly guest starred in the episode. Recurring guest voice actors Alexandra Breckenridge, actor Ralph Garman and writer Danny Smith also made minor appearances.

== Cultural references ==
Along with the episode's title, the Meg and Joe plot line heavily borrows from the storyline, as well as several scenes, of The Hand That Rocks the Cradle. The scene where Evil Stewie appears in the empty machine is a direct homage to the Star Trek episode "The Enemy Within," down to the lighting and piano fill, which has a similar premise involving an evil duplicate of Captain Kirk. While driving Meg to school, Joe asks what a Lady Gaga is. Stewie shown with yellow eyes and Vincent Price's laughter is a direct reference to Michael Jackson's Thriller music video. The evil Stewie acts like "Chucky," the main villain from the Child's Play series by David Kirschner and Don Mancini, including the way he attacked Brian, and killing people with weapons.

== Reception ==
"The Hand That Rocks the Wheelchair" was broadcast on March 6, 2011, as a part of an animated television night on Fox, and was preceded by The Simpsons and Bob's Burgers, and followed by Family Guy creator and executive producer Seth MacFarlane's spin-off, The Cleveland Show. It was watched by 6.23 million viewers, according to Nielsen ratings, despite airing simultaneously with Desperate Housewives on ABC, Undercover Boss on CBS and the season premiere of The Celebrity Apprentice on NBC. The episode also acquired a 3.1 rating in the 18–49 demographic, beating The Simpsons, Bob's Burgers and The Cleveland Show in addition to significantly edging out all three shows in total viewership. The episode's ratings decreased somewhat from the previous week's episode.

Television critics gave mostly mixed reviews toward the episode, calling the storyline "a decent return to wacky adventures of Quahog." In a simultaneous review of the episodes of The Simpsons and Bob's Burgers that preceded the show, and the episode of The Cleveland Show that followed it, The A.V. Club's Rowan Kaiser wrote, "It was still weird and a bit experimental: An awkward conversation between Meg and Joe was done almost naturalistically, while an evil Stewie clone engaged in hyper-violence beyond the usual implied cartoon violence. It wasn't as funny as it should be, but it did have its moments." Kaiser went on to criticize Meg's role in the episode, commenting, "The problem with Meg isn't just that she's treated as a punching bag by the show; it's that as either a normal character or as the butt of all the jokes, she's almost never funny or interesting." She concluded her review by stating, "I'm not sure I liked it, but I did engage with it, which is an improvement over the last few weeks of the show," and ultimately gave the episode a C+ rating, placing it third out of four, being beaten by The Simpsons episode "The Scorpion's Tale" and the Bob's Burgers episode "Sheesh! Cab, Bob?", and beating The Cleveland Show episode "The Blue, The Gray and The Brown". In a slightly more positive review of the episode, Jason Hughes of TV Squad praised the episode for its Meg-centric storyline, writing, "Meg is great as the incredibly needy, creepy, crazy, stalker type." Hughes also praised actress Mila Kunis for her portrayal of Meg, noting, "almost expected her to turn into Annie Wilkes from Misery and strap Joe to a bed." Hughes also stated his concern about the developments in the Stewie storyline writing, "I wonder if this was an acknowledgement that Stewie has changed with an intention to try and bring some of his edge back, or more like a swan song farewell to that level of callousness."
