= Brothers & Sisters (Family Guy) =

- Family Guy episode
- Episode no.: Season 9 Episode 15
- Directed by: Julius Wu
- Written by: Alex Carter
- Production code: 8ACX15
- Original air date: April 17, 2011

Guest appearances
- Julie Hagerty as Carol; Robert Loggia as himself; Michael Gross as Steven Keaton; Meredith Baxter as Elyse Keaton

Episode chronology
← Previous "Tiegs for Two"	Next → "The Big Bang Theory"
- Family Guy season 9

"Brothers & Sisters" is the 15th episode of the ninth season of the animated comedy series Family Guy. It aired on Fox in the United States on April 17, 2011. This episode follows Lois' sister Carol Pewterschmidt who turns to the Griffins after her ninth husband ends their relationship. She eventually goes on a date with Mayor Adam West and seeks to marry him, much to Lois' apprehensions, given Carol's past relationship troubles.

The episode was written by Alex Carter and directed by Julius Wu. This episode marks the second appearance of Carol, Lois's sister. However, Carol Kane does not reprise her role of Carol. Instead, actress Julie Hagerty provides the voice of Carol.

== Plot ==
When her ninth husband leaves her, a depressed Carol talks to Lois about it over the phone. Later, Carol arrives at the Griffin residence, with Lois to comfort her. Mayor Adam West also stops by, initially to ring doorbells of all the houses in the city. Discovering that they both share a lot of things in common, Carol and Adam go on a date, leading up to their first kiss at a beach. When the couple arrive back to the Griffins' home, Adam asks to marry Carol, and she accepts his proposal. In the meantime, Peter is delighted to have Adam as his brother-in-law, as he and Adam ride their bicycles together down a street.

Given that Carol had broken up with her last husband very recently, Lois is not happy with Carol's decision to marry Adam West. She persuades her to hold off on her relationship with Adam, going as far as to bring three of her previous spouses to her at the dinner table in order to prove that her visions for future happiness with Adam will only make her depressed once more. Finally convinced, Carol now rejects Adam's marriage proposal and runs off crying, leaving Adam upset as well. Because of his relationship with Carol that will no longer happen, Adam chooses to move to Alaska and become an eskimo there. Additionally, Peter becomes sad at Lois for taking away his brother-in-law, and explains that Carol should marry Adam because Peter and Lois themselves initially were not believed to be an ideal couple. At this point, Lois regrets her action to prevent Carol's relationship. She, Peter, and Carol all arrive at the Quahog airport right after Adam books his flight, only to be too late when his airplane takes off. Peter discovers Quagmire is piloting the plane and successfully tricks him into turning back to the home airport in order to drop Adam off. Carol and Adam reunite, and the two become married at a church.

== Cultural references ==
- Peter yells "Give me back my son!" into the phone, a reference to the Mel Gibson film Ransom.
- Adam West says he has AIDS, but then points at his aides. Adam sadly claims that they have AIDS. Robert Loggia expresses his anger to that joke immediately afterward by yelling "Not OK!"
- When he proposes, he calls Carol "Carol Yastrzemski" – in reference to baseball player Carl Yastrzemski – then says he hopes that is her last name.
- During dinner, he almost says Beetlejuice three times, as a reference to the 1988 film.
- One of Carol's former husband's was Doggie Daddy, a Hanna-Barbera character from The Quick Draw McGraw Show.
- After proposing to Carol, West says they'll have to keep the upcoming marriage quiet to keep the local nobleman from invoking primae noctis or droit du seigneur, which is the practice of royalty claiming the right to bed a future bride. (This practice never existed in medieval Europe as is often believed but has been recorded in other areas).

== Reception ==
The A.V. Club graded the episode a B, stating "While I thought that last week's Family Guy was something of a return to form, this episode was closer to a modern Simpsons episode in certain ways—aping the form of the classics, while not quite getting it right. Still good—not great".
