= Baby, You Knock Me Out =

- Family Guy episode
- Episode no.: Season 9 Episode 5
- Directed by: Julius Wu
- Written by: Alex Carter
- Production code: 8ACX05
- Original air date: November 14, 2010

Guest appearances
- Luke Adams as club manager; Carrie Fisher as Angela; Nicole Sullivan as Boxer; John Viener as Ring Announcer

Episode chronology
| ← Previous "Halloween on Spooner Street" | Next → "Brian Writes a Bestseller" |
- Family Guy season 9

"Baby, You Knock Me Out" is the fifth episode of the ninth season of the animated comedy series Family Guy. It originally aired on Fox in the United States on November 14, 2010. The episode follows housewife Lois after she is convinced to become a championship boxer. As she continues fighting, however, she eventually decides to go into retirement, only to be challenged by the top-ranked fighter in all of Rhode Island. Lois accepts the challenge, facing the fight of her life, causing her to unleash pent-up anger at Peter.

The episode was written by Alex Carter and directed by Julius Wu. It received mostly positive reviews from critics for its storyline and many cultural references. According to Nielsen ratings, it was viewed in 7.00 million homes in its original airing. The episode featured guest performances by Luke Adams, Carrie Fisher and Nicole Sullivan, along with several recurring guest voice actors for the series. It was first announced at the 2009 San Diego Comic-Con.

== Plot ==
Announcing his excitement for his upcoming birthday, Peter eagerly awaits to receive his gifts. After receiving a birthday card from Cleveland, Peter receives tickets to a female's boxing club from Quagmire, who invites the group there, where Peter's wife, Lois, is volunteered to participate in a fight. Easily beating her competition in an instant, the club owner suggests she become a professional boxer. Unable to understand how she won the fight, Lois becomes reluctant to fight anyone else. After Peter takes her blindfolded to a boxing club (even tricking her into wearing a boxing outfit) she thinks is a fancy restaurant, Lois becomes angered at him for tricking her. By imagining that she is beating up Peter, she is able to win the fight. Returning home, Lois begins taking boxing seriously, and starts working out. Continued to be angered by Peter, Lois aspires to be a champion boxer, and eventually becomes the top-ranked boxer in Quahog. During a fight, however, Lois' nose is broken, and she becomes reluctant to fight any longer. Going on to reveal that the only reason she fought was because of her hatred of her husband's obsession with boxing, and that she imagined she was beating up Peter during her matches because she can't actually beat him up for real, Lois and Peter agree to end her career, and go into retirement.

In a ceremony honoring Lois, held by Mayor Adam West, she is called out by Deirdre Jackson, an undefeated champion fighter who was said to have killed three women in the ring, and she challenges Lois to a match. After insulting and humiliating Peter at the statue dedication (milking his man-breasts like cow udders), Jackson eventually convinces Lois to compete and come out of retirement. In a pre-fight interview with Tom Tucker, Jackson announces her intention to kill her opponent in Round 6, which only causes Lois to become even more angered. As the match begins, Lois becomes an easy target for Jackson in the first round. Feeling she stands no chance, Lois is convinced to continue fighting, making it to the sixth round. Badly beaten, Lois continues to be beaten by Jackson, who suddenly hits her with a big left hook, causing her to become nearly unconscious. Quickly recovering, Lois then begins unleashing her pent-up rage, and eventually and finally knocks her opponent unconscious herself. The next day, Lois begins her recovery as a champion, and she is surrounded by her family at the breakfast table. Peter is also excited, as he triumphantly announces that he now able to eat his cereal with his own breast milk, saved from his encounter with Jackson.

== Production and development ==
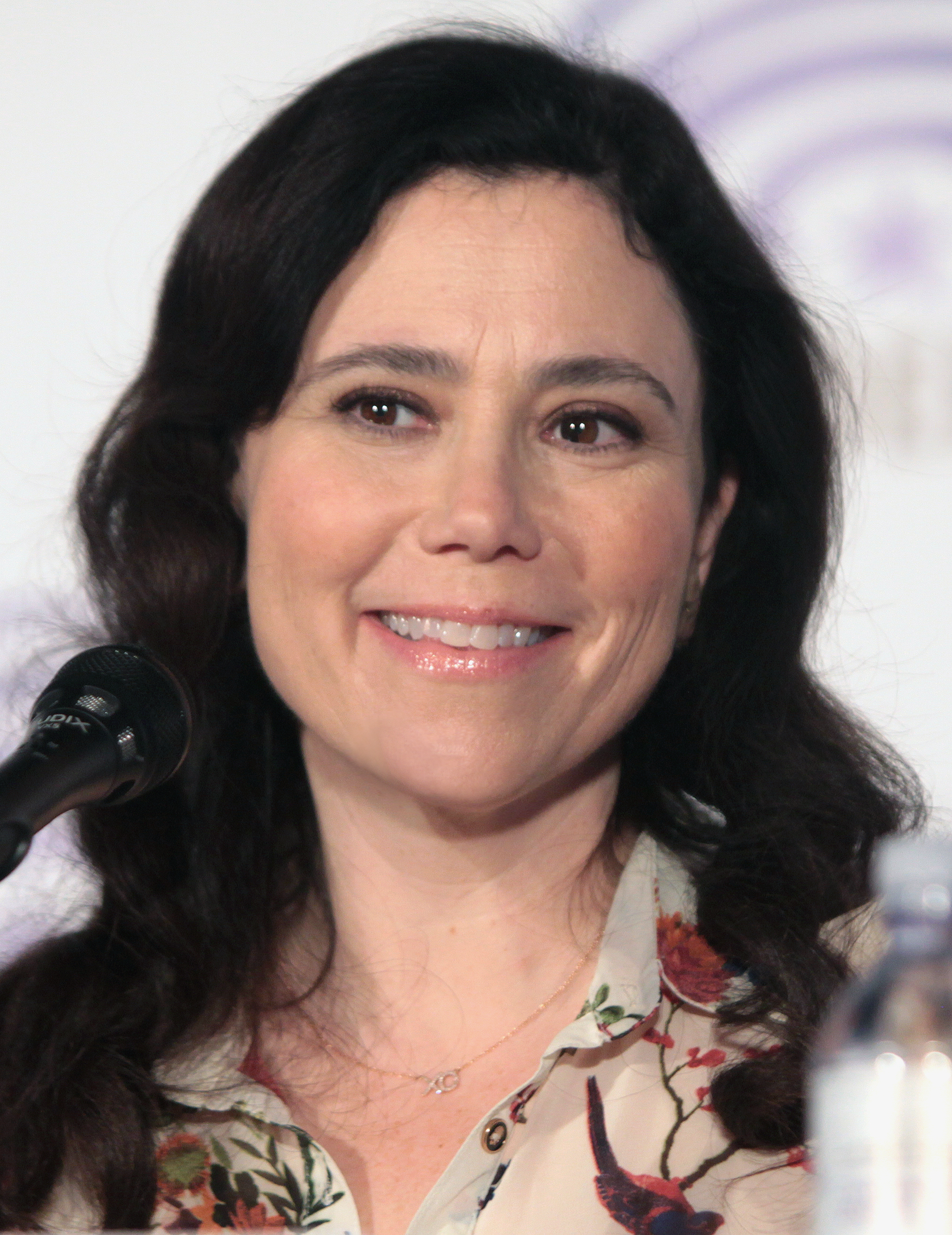
Cast member Alex Borstein first announced the episode at the 2009 San Diego Comic-Con.

First announced at the 2009 San Diego Comic-Con by main cast member Alex Borstein, the episode was written by series regular Alex Carter, and directed by series regular Julius Wu before the conclusion of the eighth production season. Series veterans Peter Shin and James Purdum, both of whom having previously served as animation directors, served as supervising directors for the episode, with episode writer Alex Carter, along with Andrew Goldberg, Elaine Ko, Spencer Porter and Aaron Blitzstein serving as staff writers for the episode. Composer Ron Jones, who has worked on the series since its inception, returned to compose the music for "Baby, You Knock Me Out".

In addition to the regular cast, actor Luke Adams, actress Carrie Fisher and actress Nicole Sullivan guest starred in the episode. Recurring guest voice actors Ralph Garman, writer Danny Smith, writer Alec Sulkin and writer John Viener made minor appearances. Recurring guest cast members Adam West and Patrick Warburton appeared in the episode as well.

== Cultural references ==
The plot of the episode parodies the film Rocky III, with the character of Deirdre Jackson being a female replica of Clubber Lang from the third film of the series. On his very lengthy audio birthday card, Cleveland can be heard singing Hanson's "MMMBop". During Lois' final fight, Peter sings the Survivor song "Eye of the Tiger" and is interrupted by Quagmire to focus on the fight.

== Reception ==
"Baby, You Knock Me Out" was broadcast on November 14, 2010, as a part of an animated television night on Fox, and was preceded by The Simpsons, and Family Guy creator and executive producer Seth MacFarlane's spin-off, The Cleveland Show, and followed by an episode of American Dad!. It was watched by 7.00 million viewers, according to Nielsen ratings, despite airing simultaneously with Desperate Housewives on ABC, Undercover Boss on CBS and Sunday Night Football on NBC. The episode also acquired a 3.3 rating in the 18–49 demographic, beating American Dad! and The Cleveland Show in addition to significantly edging out both shows in total viewership. The episode's ratings decreased significantly from the previous week's episode.

Television critics reacted mostly positive toward the episode, calling the storyline "another strong outing, once it got going." In a simultaneous review of the episodes of The Simpsons and The Cleveland Show that preceded the show, and the broadcast of American Dad! that followed it, The A.V. Club's Emily VanDerWerff wrote, "Family Guy, like The Simpsons last year, is quietly turning out a pretty solid season for what the show has become in its later years." VanDerWerff went on to compliment several elements of the show, including the under reliance on cut-away gags, and its utilization of "such time-honored bits as Brian acting like a dog or Peter acting like a 4-year-old." She ultimately gave the episode a B rating, the second best rating of the night, beating The Cleveland Show episode "Little Man on Campus" and the American Dad! episode "Stan's Food Restaurant". In a slightly more neutral review of the episode, Jason Hughes of TV Squad praised the episode's "nonsensical humor" and its acknowledgment of Cleveland Brown and The Cleveland Show. Hughes went on to comment on the episode's ability to focus on the main storyline, writing, "as is becoming more common, [cut-away gags] were again few and far between as the central plot dominated the episode. In fact, the boxing storyline was the only plot going, which is incredibly rare in any sitcom format."
