= German Guy =

- Family Guy episode
- Episode no.: Season 9 Episode 11
- Directed by: Cyndi Tang
- Written by: Patrick Meighan
- Production code: 8ACX14
- Original air date: February 20, 2011

Guest appearance
- Alan Tudyk as German pilot

Episode chronology
| ← Previous "Friends of Peter G." | Next → "The Hand That Rocks the Wheelchair" |
- Family Guy season 9

"German Guy" is the 13th episode of the ninth season of the animated comedy series Family Guy. It originally aired on Fox in the United States on February 20, 2011. The episode follows high school student Chris Griffin, as he attempts to find a new hobby. He soon comes across a puppeteer named Franz, who befriends Chris and introduces him to his vast puppet collection. Meanwhile, Chris' neighbor, Herbert, tries to warn him of Franz's past as a World War II Nazi, but his attempts are largely unsuccessful.

The episode was written by Patrick Meighan and directed by Cyndi Tang. It received mostly mixed reviews from critics for its storyline and many cultural references. According to Nielsen ratings, it was viewed in 6.57 million homes in its original airing. The episode featured guest performances by Ralph Garman and Alan Tudyk, along with several recurring guest voice actors for the series.

== Plot ==
Peter and Lois decide that Chris needs a new hobby; Peter and Chris begin collecting stamps and drinking, but Chris is not interested in either. He soon discovers a newly opened puppet shop, where he befriends the owner, Franz Gutentag. The two bond over the puppets, creating their own puppets and stories (which Chris describes as the "Germanest thing he's ever seen"), but Herbert recognizes Franz as someone from his past and confronts Peter and Lois, telling them that Franz is a Nazi SS lieutenant named Franz Schlechtnacht, whom he had met during World War II after being shot down in his plane. He was then taken to a concentration camp by the Nazis that was run by Franz, after he was believed to be gay, which meant the Geneva Convention (1929) standards were not respected due to Nazi racial ideology against Homosexuals, and was forced to undergo hard labor. Peter and Lois are reluctant to believe Herbert, instead deciding to invite Franz over for dinner. The next day, Chris visits Franz, and asks him if he is a Nazi. Franz immediately rejects the notion, and Peter enters the home to invite Franz over for dinner. Needing to use the restroom, Chris soon discovers a room filled with Nazi memorabilia.

Soon after, Franz finds that Chris has discovered his secret and decides to take Peter and Chris to the basement to murder them. Successfully able to wrestle the gun from Franz, Chris is faced with whether to shoot his father or Franz, questioning which one is his "real father." Peter then points out that he and Franz look nothing alike; confused, Chris asks when his birthday is — a question that Peter does not know the answer to. When Franz answers the question correctly, Chris shoots Peter, causing Franz to grab the gun from him and take the two hostage. The next morning, Lois visits Franz, telling him that Chris and Peter did not return home. Franz tells Lois that he has not seen the two, but the two discover a small window in the basement that they have become trapped in. Chris sees Herbert come by and begs Herbert to save them. Dressing in his military uniform, Herbert storms Franz's home. Franz then rips off his sweater vest and shirt to reveal his Nazi uniform, and the two veterans begin fighting; however, the fight is considerably slow given their respective ages and includes a visit from Franz's personal minder when he is unable to rise from the couch after he and Herbert stop to take their pills. Finally, however, Franz stumbles and falls off his front porch step; Herbert tries to grab him, but Franz grabs his hand short and is killed instantly by the fall. Herbert then salutes Franz's corpse before stuffing it into the oven and turning on the gas. After rescuing Chris and Peter, Chris thanks Herbert, and the two become friends again. Meg then shows up and tells Peter that Herbert had called her "thunder thighs", after which Peter thanks Herbert.

== Production and development ==
The episode was written by series regular Patrick Meighan and directed by series regular Cyndi Tang, both in their second episode during the course of the ninth production season. Series veterans Peter Shin and James Purdum, both of whom having previously served as animation directors, served as supervising directors for the episode, with Andrew Goldberg, Alex Carter, Elaine Ko, Spencer Porter and Aaron Blitzstein serving as staff writers for the episode. Composer Walter Murphy, who has worked on the series since its inception, returned to compose the music for "Friends of Peter G.".

In addition to the regular cast, actor Alan Tudyk guest starred in the episode. Recurring guest voice actors Alexandra Breckenridge, actor John G. Brennan, writer Alec Sulkin, actor Ralph Garman and writer John Viener made minor appearances throughout the episode.

== Cultural references ==
- The premise of a teenage boy befriending a Nazi war criminal is a parody of Apt Pupil, a novella written by Stephen King, and made into a film of the same name, starring Ian McKellen and Brad Renfro.
- The character of Franz Schlechtnacht parodies Franz Kindler from Orson Welles' The Stranger (1946), a fugitive nazi in the United States whose sole identifying trait is his obsession with clocks. Peter meets Franz in his house, and there is a wall if handmade clocks. Franz offers a clock to Peter to cement their new friendship but later rescinds the offer. Other parallels is that Herbert's dog Jesse similar to Red in the film leads to Franz's downfall. Franz falls to his end in the show and in the film.
- When Peter tells Lois, "Uhh life uhhh...uhhh... finds a way", it refers to Jeff Goldblum's line in Jurassic Park.
- Franz's genuine and false surnames are a play on the German greeting "Guten Tag", meaning "Good Day" and its polarization, "Schlecht(e) Nacht", or "Bad Night".
- At one point, a cutaway gag points out that paying a woman to star in a porno is not prostitution and therefore legal before saying the message is brought to you by the Church of Jesus Christ of Latter-day Saints.
- When Franz makes a puppet resembling Chris, he makes it sing and dance to Falco's song "Der Kommissar", and refers to the song as "today's pop culture". The song actually came out in 1981. Chris describes the puppet dance as "the Germanest thing I've ever seen!", even though Falco was Austrian.
- When Chris dresses the two puppets in Franz's shop, he dresses them as Jacob and Edward from the Twilight series.
- When Lois comes to Franz's house, their conversation mimics the initial confrontation between Clarice Starling and Buffalo Bill in Silence of the Lambs: "Oh wait, is he a great big fat person?" "He's a large man, yes, sir."
- After Herbert tells his story, Peter thinks he is on the show Punk'd.
- Peter asks Herbert to convey the message "Thunder-Thighs are on the move, Thunder-Thighs are loose" to Meg. This is a reference to the theme tune of animated series ThunderCats.
- The nose of Herbert's fighter plane is painted with the 'Shark' faced nose art of the Flying Tigers, an American volunteer fighter unit in China during World War II.
- Franz falling off the step on the porch is a reference to Julia's death in Cowboy Bebop.

== Reception ==
Rowan Kaiser of The A.V. Club gave "German Guy" a negative review, criticizing its use of Herbert as a main character. He praised the beginning, but stated that "it makes the awfulness of the rest of the episode stand in stark contrast". He rated "German Guy" D−. Jason Hughes of TV Squad reacted positively to the episode, praising the scene where Chris cannot decide whom to shoot between Franz and Peter and the final battle between Franz and Herbert.
