= Halloween on Spooner Street =

- Family Guy episode
- Episode no.: Season 9 Episode 4
- Directed by: Jerry Langford
- Written by: Andrew Goldberg
- Production code: 8ACX06
- Original air date: November 7, 2010

Guest appearances
- James Burkholder as Bully; Chris Cox as Abusive Midget Man; Barclay DeVeau as Patty; Noah Matthews as Bully; Natasha Melnick as Ruth; Christina Milian as Esther; Lyndon Smith; Patrick Stewart as Dick Pump; Nana Visitor as Justin's Mom; Lisa Wilhoit as Connie D'Amico

Episode chronology
| ← Previous "Welcome Back, Carter" | Next → "Baby, You Knock Me Out" |
- Family Guy season 9

"Halloween on Spooner Street" is the fourth episode of the ninth season of the animated comedy series Family Guy. It originally aired on Fox in the United States on November 7, 2010. The episode follows baby Stewie and anthropomorphic dog Brian as they go trick-or-treating on Halloween. Stewie is confronted by bullies, who steal his candy, causing the two to attempt to take the candy back. Meanwhile, neighbors Peter and Joe decide to play several pranks on their other neighbor, Glenn Quagmire, causing him to want to seek revenge on his friends while Meg and Chris attend a teenage halloween party at Connie D'Amico's house. The episode is the first Halloween special of the series as well as one of the only episodes to have three subplots.

The episode was written by Andrew Goldberg and directed by Jerry Langford. It received praise from critics for its storyline and many cultural references. According to Nielsen ratings, it was viewed in 7.97 million homes in its original airing. The episode featured guest performances by James Burkholder, Chris Cox, Barclay DeVeau, Ralph Garman, Candace Marie, Noah Matthews, Natasha Melnick, Christina Milian, Lyndon Smith, Patrick Stewart, Nana Visitor and Lisa Wilhoit, along with several recurring guest voice actors for the series. "Halloween on Spooner Street" was one of five episodes submitted for consideration for an Emmy Award in the "Outstanding Comedy Series" category in 2011.

== Plot ==
Peter and Joe target Quagmire for this year's Halloween pranks, including bombarding him with eggs, Joe dressing up as a girl and sleeping with him, and infecting him with an unknown disease carried by a mosquito from Senegal. Afterwards, Peter praises Quagmire for being a good sport and the two decide to go drinking. Deciding to approach Joe, they convince him to allow them to follow him in his police car. Agreeing to do so only if they stay in his car, Peter and Quagmire soon become a nuisance. Ultimately, they drive to an old airfield where they discover a Mitsubishi Zero, a Japanese fighter plane used during World War II. Quagmire flies the two into the sky and pretending to have Japanese heritage and the urge to do kamikaze he eventually takes them on a high speed dive into the ocean near Quahog Harbor, stopping only inches from crashing stating that it was payback for making him have sex with Joe.

Meanwhile, Stewie discovers trick-or-treaters (at first thinking they are real monsters and shooting at them with an M16), and soon wants to partake in the activity. Deciding to dress as a baby duck, he is subsequently bullied by a gang of three older boys who steal his candy. Searching for Brian, Stewie blames him for causing him to lose his candy and convinces him to steal back the candy from the bullies. Approaching the bullies to get the candy back, Brian is immediately painted pink. Seeking revenge, Stewie half jokingly suggests to Brian that they kill the bullies, though they both agree they can't actually do that. When his plan to threaten them with a bazooka fails (and ends up killing a Godzilla-like monster instead), Stewie goes to "Plan B" and begins crying for his mother. Lois then confronts the lead bully Justin's mother and becomes her bully instead, demanding Stewie's candy back, demanding Justin's candy, and $40. But because she does not have any money, Lois takes their welcome mat and says she'll be back tomorrow for $80.

The same night, Meg decides to go trick-or-treating with her friends and attends a party held at Connie D'Amico's house. Excited no one can see through her slutty cat costume (even her father, Peter, who says "Ugly bitches!" to her and her friends), Meg eventually wins at spin the bottle; she unknowingly begins making out in a dark closet with her brother Chris, who is wearing an Optimus Prime costume that conceals his identity. When Connie opens the closet, the siblings are in their underwear, and immediately horrified at the revelation.

During the credits, Stewie and Brian reminiscing of the night and sorting their candy just as Meg and Chris come home. Meg and Chris both make light of the situation by convincing each other that they successfully hooked up with a hot date. Meg states that her date might even call back, but Chris immediately says that she might be disappointed, even though she was most likely just playing along.

== Production and development ==
The episode was written by series regular Andrew Goldberg and directed by series regular Jerry Langford before the conclusion of the ninth production season. Series veterans Peter Shin and James Purdum, both of whom having previously served as animation directors, served as supervising directors for the episode, with episode writer Goldberg, along with Alex Carter, Elaine Ko, Spencer Porter and Aaron Blitzstein serving as staff writers for the episode. Composer Walter Murphy, who has worked on the series since its inception, returned to compose the music for "Halloween on Spooner Street". The episode was the first Halloween special to be produced for the series.

In addition to the regular cast, the episode featured guest performances by actors James Burkholder, Noah Matthews, Lyndon Smith, Patrick Stewart, Nana Visitor, and Lisa Wilhoit, voice actors Chris Cox and Barclay DeVeau, and performer and actress Christina Milian. Recurring guest voice actors John G. Brennan, writers Danny Smith, Alec Sulkin, and John Viener, and actor Ralph Garman, made minor appearances. Adam West made a guest appearance as well.

== Cultural references ==
Chris dresses up as Bill Cosby for Halloween, but Lois insists that he change his costume because he is wearing blackface. He reluctantly changes his Halloween costume and dresses up as Optimus Prime. When Quagmire talks about him being half-Japanese, Peter confuses "kamikaze" with "Karma Chameleon", the 1983 Culture Club song. The Pink Panther makes another appearance in the show, when he asks Brian if it is his first day being pink. Brian says "yes", to which Pink Panther replies "Welcome to hell." When Stewie climbs on top of the shed to threaten the bullies who stole his candy, he shouts "hello" while pointing a rocket launcher at them, which is a reference to Raiders of the Lost Ark. When Joe, Peter and Quagmire fly off in a Japanese Zero, an Asian version of the theme from Top Gun plays.

== Reception ==
"Halloween on Spooner Street" was broadcast on November 7, 2010, as a part of an animated television night on Fox, and was preceded by The Simpsons, and Family Guy creator and executive producer Seth MacFarlane's spin-off, The Cleveland Show, and followed by an episode of American Dad!. It was watched by 7.97 million viewers, according to Nielsen ratings, despite airing simultaneously with Desperate Housewives on ABC, The Amazing Race on CBS and Sunday Night Football on NBC. The episode also acquired a 3.8 rating in the 18–49 demographic, beating The Simpsons, American Dad! and The Cleveland Show in addition to significantly edging out American Dad! and The Cleveland Show in total viewership. The episode's ratings increased significantly from the previous episode.

Television critics had mostly positive reactions to "Halloween", calling the Brian/Stewie storyline "good," but saying it got "dragged down by everything around it." In a simultaneous review of the episodes of The Simpsons and The Cleveland Show that preceded the show, and the broadcast of American Dad! that followed it, The A.V. Club's Emily VanDerWerff wrote of the episode, "I very much enjoyed nearly everything in the A-story, which involved Brian taking Stewie trick or treating." VanDerWeff went on to state her dislike of the pranks involving Peter, Joe and Quagmire, as well as the final scene involving Meg and Chris, commenting, "I think the show thinks making viewers squeamish with this is funny, but at this point, so little about it is unexpected or shocking that it would have the ability to produce even horrified laughter." She ultimately gave the episode a C+ rating, the second best rating of the night, beating The Cleveland Show episode "It's the Great Pancake, Cleveland Brown" and The Simpsons episode "Treehouse of Horror XXI". In a slightly more positive review of the episode, Jason Hughes of TV Squad praised the episode's portrayal of Halloween, including the commentary regarding Meg's "slutty costume." Hughes went on to comment on the pranks by Peter and Joe on Quagmire, writing, "The story wasn't all that great, but the payoffs of the unnamed virus that downed Quagmire and his kamikaze fake-out made it ultimately worth the time investment."

The episode was among four other episodes submitted by the Family Guy production team for consideration of an Emmy Award nomination, in the Primetime Emmy Award for Outstanding Comedy Series category. "Halloween on Spooner Street" was submitted, along with "And I'm Joyce Kinney", "Road to the North Pole", "New Kidney in Town" and "Trading Places". The series was successfully nominated in 2009, but failed to merit an award. Mark Hentemann, executive producer and showrunner of Family Guy said of the nominating process, "We had internal discussions in the writers' room, and it seemed like we were much more akin to the other primetime comedies than we were to children's shows in animation. We assumed we would not get anywhere, and so it was a great surprise when we got the nomination."

During the April 1, 2011 broadcast of a Major League Baseball game between the New York Mets and the Florida Marlins on the Mets' cable network SportsNet New York, an audio clip from the episode (where Stewie bemoans the frustration of being a Mets fan by giving up on the team after they give up an Opening Day home run) was played. An SNY spokesman said, "It was a very poor decision by an individual employee and the matter is being dealt with internally."
