= And Then There Were Fewer =

- Family Guy episode
- Episode no.: Season 9 Episode 1
- Directed by: Dominic Polcino
- Written by: Cherry Chevapravatdumrong
- Production code: 8ACX01-02
- Original air date: September 26, 2010

Guest appearances
- Drew Barrymore as Jillian Russell; H. Jon Benjamin as Carl; Max Burkholder as child; Colin Ford as child; Patrick Stewart as talking cat; Ashley Tisdale as Priscilla; James Woods as himself

Episode chronology
← Previous "Partial Terms of Endearment"	Next → "Excellence in Broadcasting"
- Family Guy season 9

"And Then There Were Fewer" is the one-hour-long season premiere of the ninth season of the American adult animated television series Family Guy, and the 148th overall episode. It originally aired on Fox in the United States on September 26, 2010. The episode follows the citizens of the fictional city of Quahog in the U.S. state of Rhode Island after they are invited by actor James Woods to his stately mansion on a remote island. While there, a series of murders occur, and the group struggles to determine who committed the mysterious acts, before ultimately attempting to escape from the island, and avoid being murdered themselves. The episode borrows its premise and title from Agatha Christie's 1939 murder mystery And Then There Were None, while also serving as a parody of the 1985 film Clue.

The episode was written by Cherry Chevapravatdumrong and directed by Dominic Polcino. It received high acclaim from critics, who praised its storyline and cultural references, and is generally considered one of the best episodes of Family Guy. According to Nielsen ratings, it was viewed in 9.41 million homes in its original airing. The episode features guest performances by Drew Barrymore, H. Jon Benjamin, Max Burkholder, Colin Ford, Patrick Stewart, Ashley Tisdale and James Woods, along with several recurring guest voice actors for the series. It was the first Family Guy episode to air in 16:9 and high definition. The episode was nominated for Outstanding Music Composition for a Series at the 63rd Primetime Emmy Awards. "And Then There Were Fewer" was released on DVD along with two other episodes from the season on December 13, 2011. The show confirmed afterward that it was “canon,” and the characters that died (e.g. Diane Simmons, Muriel Goldman, etc.) would not be brought back in the future, except for James Woods, as he is seen in the thirteenth episode of season 10, "Tom Tucker: The Man and His Dream", in which he tells Peter and Tom that paramedics brought him to a secret science lab made for celebrities and revived him.

== Plot ==
The Griffins and most of the known residents of Quahog are anonymously invited to a dinner party in their honor at a mysterious cliffside mansion. Upon their arrival, their host is revealed to be James Woods, who states he has become a born-again Christian thanks to his new girlfriend, Priscilla, and wishes to repent for all his wrongdoings.

Early into the night, as James and Priscilla go to the kitchen, Quagmire's girlfriend Stephanie is mysteriously shot and killed when she sits in James's seat, leading the guests to believe that James intends to murder them all. Though they try to run, a thunderstorm destroys the bridge, stranding them. After discovering that Stephanie's body has disappeared and returning amidst accusations, James pleads innocence before he, too, is stabbed in front of the guests by an unseen killer with a knife during a power outage, causing Priscilla to faint. Trapped on the remote estate with no way of contacting anyone due to the storm and being out of cell phone range, the guests realize that the killer is among them.

The guests find the suppressed gun that was timed to fire at the chair Stephanie was sitting in, leading them to realize that it was intended for James and that Stephanie was killed by accident. While searching for clues, they realize that many of them have motives for wanting revenge on James. After finding and reading a notebook of James's past misdeeds in a secret room, Mort's wife, Muriel, disappears after it is discovered that James was blackmailing her into supplying him with free medicine, causing everyone to suspect her as the culprit. The guests split up into teams to search the mansion for Muriel. However, she turns up dead soon after by being stabbed in the back with the same knife used to stab James. They realize Priscilla is also missing, making everyone think she is the killer. Jillian's husband, Derek Wilcox, goes to an upper balcony to find a cell phone signal and contact the police but is killed with James's Golden Globe Award.

Back with the other guests, Consuela points out that the award is missing. Everyone decides to travel as one group and search everyone's rooms. Eventually, Meg locates the bloodstained award underneath Tom Tucker's bed. Tom suggests that Priscilla planted it there, but they then discover her dead body in a ceiling vent of the room. Tom is thus believed to be the killer and is chased and caught by Peter, Joe, Carl, Dr. Hartman, Quagmire, Seamus, and Mayor Adam West.

The next morning, Tom is arrested, and the guests prepare to leave. Lois goes to talk to Tom's co-anchor, Diane Simmons, only to intuitively realize Diane is the true murderer when Diane shows her a dress for her solo debut on the news, even though Diane could not have known that Tom would soon be leaving. Exposed, Diane holds Lois at gunpoint and reveals that she had secretly dated James until he dumped her on her 40th birthday, around which Tom arranged for her to be replaced by a younger woman as co-anchor. Seeking retribution against both James and Tom, Diane bribed Priscilla, who was revealed to be a station intern, to have James become a born-again Christian and throw the dinner party so she could murder James and set Tom up for the crime. Her plot went awry upon Stephanie's accidental death, forcing Diane to stab James following the power outage, and later Priscilla and Muriel when they saw Diane tampering with the evidence, and Derek was killed to prevent the first responders from arriving early. However, Diane admits that the mysterious disappearance of Stephanie's body was the only detail she was clueless about; a cutaway reveals that her body was stolen by Quagmire likely for necrophiliac purposes.

Diane then attempts to kill Lois by forcing her outside to a nearby cliff, only to be shot and killed herself, falling off the cliff in the process. Lois thanks her unseen savior and leaves, unaware that it was Stewie, somewhat knowing the truth before and armed with a suppressed sniper rifle, who saved her. He only did it proclaiming that he's the only one who has the right to kill Lois, showing that he hasn't given up on that goal.

== Production and development ==
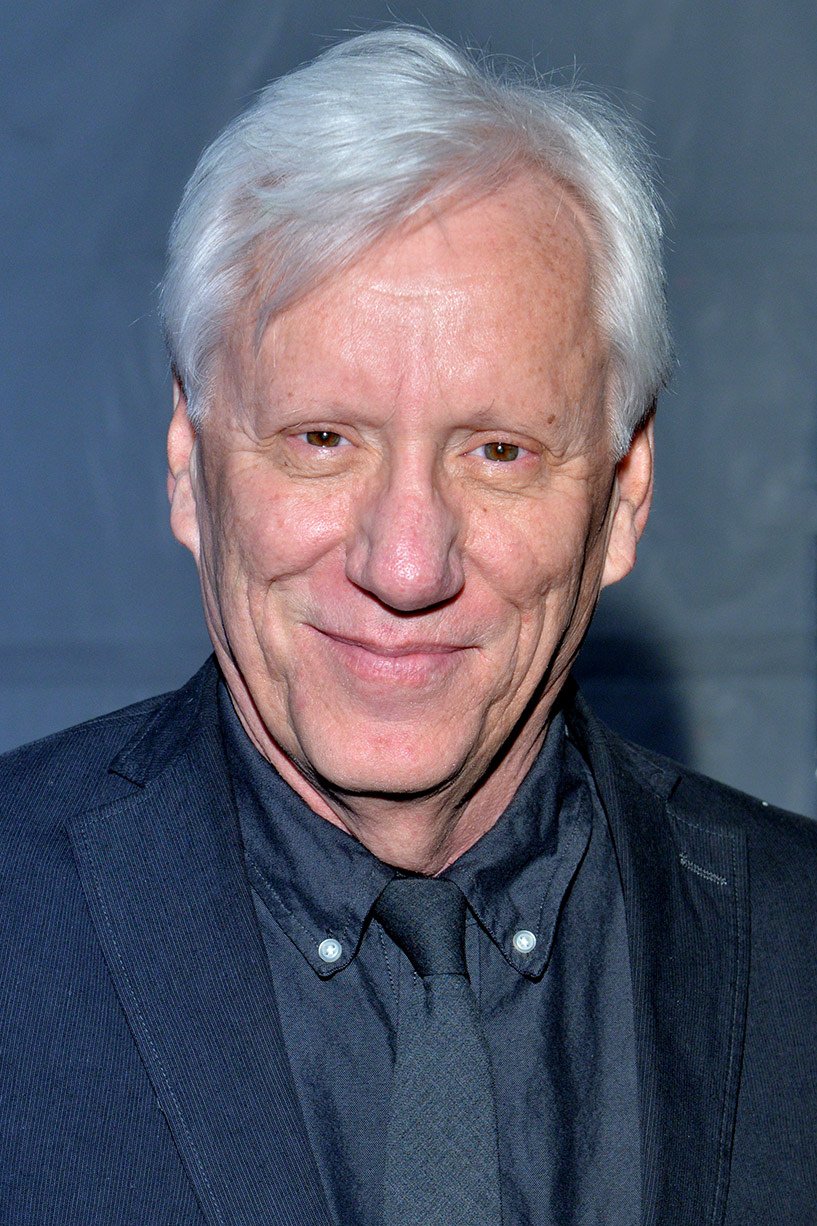
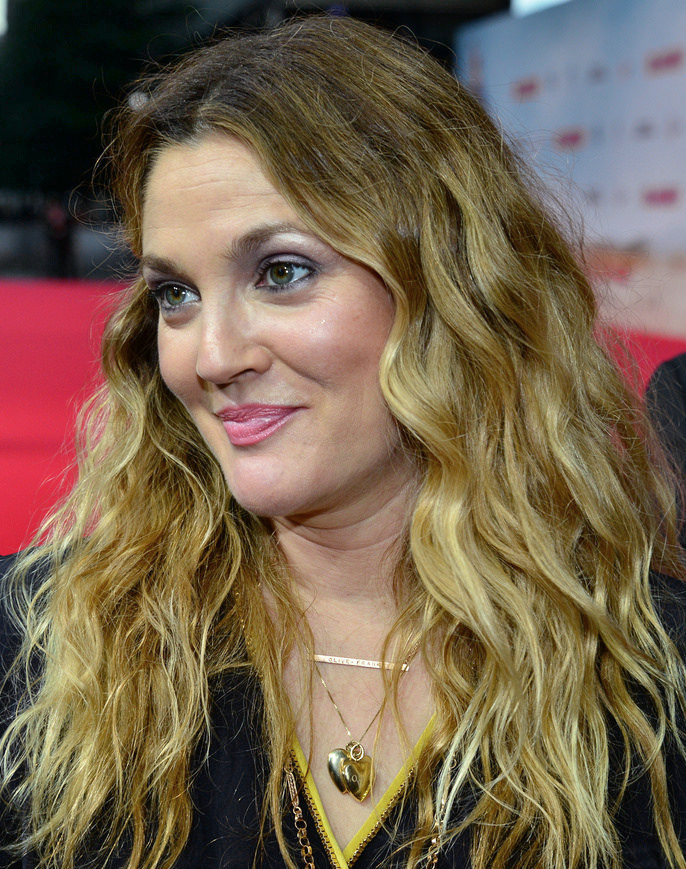
James Woods (left) and Drew Barrymore reprised their recurring roles as himself and Jillian Russell, respectively.

The episode was first announced at the 2010 San Diego Comic-Con in San Diego, California, on July 24, 2010, by series creator and executive producer Seth MacFarlane. It was directed by series regular Dominic Polcino and written by series regular Cherry Chevapravatdumrong shortly after the conclusion of the eighth production season, which completed its airing on television on June 20, 2010. The episode takes its title from the Agatha Christie novel And Then There Were None, and was largely based on the 1985 comedy film Clue. Series regulars Peter Shin and James Purdum served as supervising director, with Andrew Goldberg, Alex Carter, Elaine Ko, and Spencer Porter serving as staff writers for the episode. Composer Walter Murphy, who has worked on the series since its inception, returned to compose the music for "And Then There Were Fewer". "And Then There Were Fewer" was the first episode of Family Guy to be broadcast in high definition, with series showrunners Mark Hentemann and Steve Callaghan overseeing the transition.

The episode was dedicated to series creator and executive producer Seth MacFarlane's mother, Ann Perry MacFarlane, following her death from cancer on July 16, 2010. The original idea of the episode was sent to series showrunner and executive producer Hentemann in a text from Seth MacFarlane simply stating "murder mystery."

"And Then There Were Fewer", along with the two other episodes from Family Guy's ninth season, was released on a three-disc DVD set in the United States on December 13, 2011. The sets include brief audio commentaries by various crew and cast members for several episodes, a collection of deleted scenes and animatics, a special mini-feature which discussed the process behind animating "And Then There Were Fewer", a mini-feature entitled "The Comical Adventures of Family Guy – Brian & Stewie: The Lost Phone Call", and footage of the Family Guy panel at the 2010 San Diego Comic-Con.

In addition to the regular cast, actress Drew Barrymore reprised her role as Jillian Russell, the former girlfriend of Brian; actor James Woods, in his fifth appearance in the series, reprised his role as the overly exaggerated version of himself; actress Ashley Tisdale (who is known for playing Candace Flynn on Disney Channel's Phineas and Ferb, the show created by Family Guy alumnus Dan Povenmire) made her first official appearance on Family Guy as James Woods's girlfriend, Priscilla; and voice actor H. Jon Benjamin reprised his role as Quahog Market owner Carl. Recurring guest voice actors Lori Alan, John G. Brennan, Nicole Sullivan, Jennifer Tilly, and John Viener reprised their roles as news reporter Diane Simmons, Quahog pharmacist Mort Goldman, Muriel Goldman, Griffin family neighbor Bonnie Swanson, and Jillian's husband, Derek Wilcox, respectively. A minor appearance was also made by Family Guy writer and regular voice artist Danny Smith.

== Cultural references ==
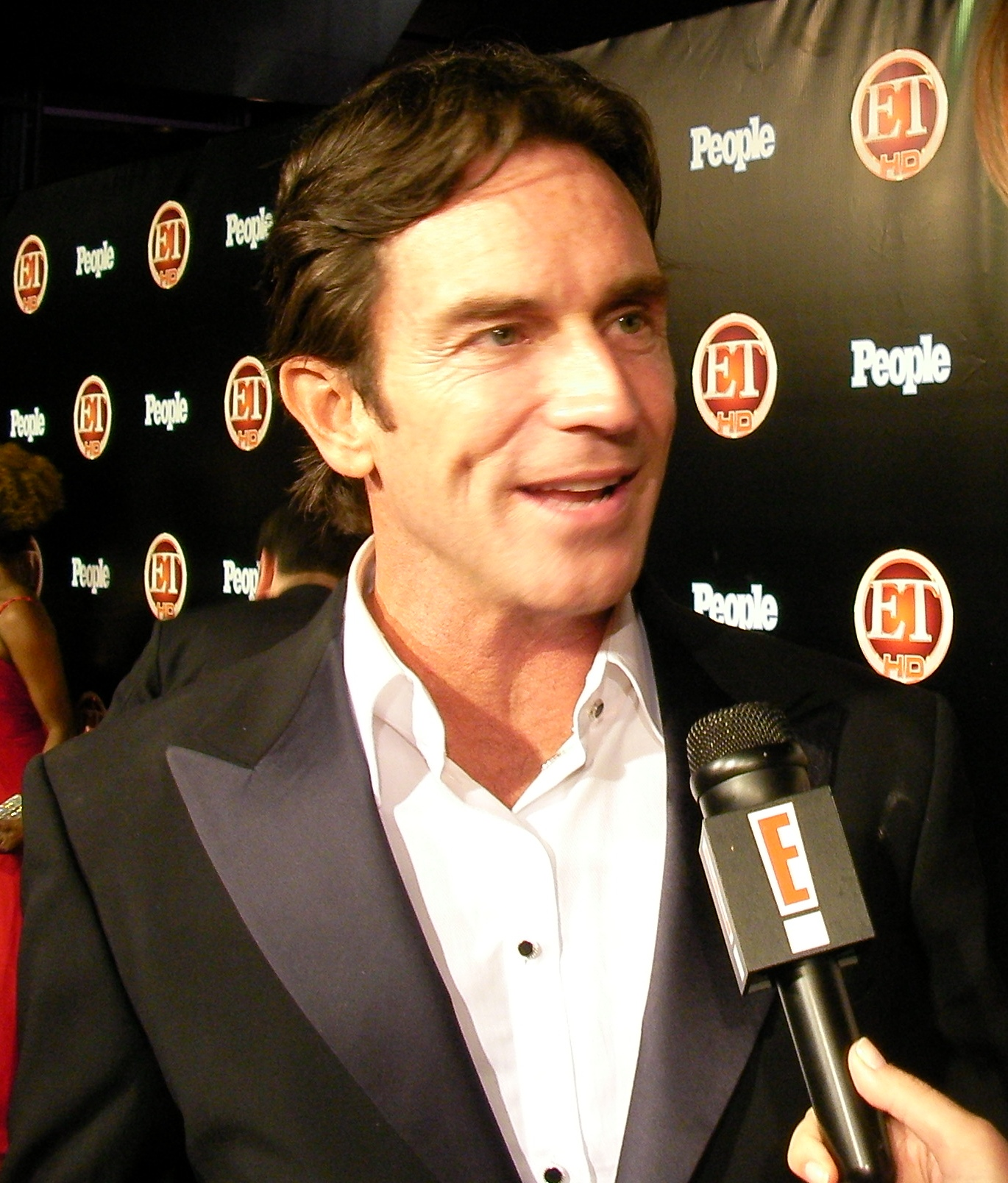
Survivor host Jeff Probst was referenced in the episode.

The episode borrows heavily from the comedy films Clue (1985) and Murder by Death (1976), and is largely based upon the 1939 Agatha Christie novel And Then There Were None. The opening scene of the episode is similar to that of Stanley Kubrick's The Shining. Once the Griffin family arrives at the mansion, Lois remarks on the estate's beauty, wondering if television host Jeff Probst has a similar home. As they walk into the mansion, Sir John Everett Millais's Ophelia is seen. As dinner commences, Carl begins conversing with Tom Tucker and discusses the plot of the 1986 fantasy film Labyrinth, directed by Jim Henson.

After Tucker is accused of murdering James Woods, he reveals that Woods talked him out of auditioning for the lead role in the 1984 hit horror film A Nightmare on Elm Street. The finger is then pointed at Mayor West, who tells the group of his hardships on the social networking service Twitter, after Woods stole his originally intended username. Diane Simmons also goes on to state that Woods had promised to introduce her to former CBS news anchor Dan Rather, but ultimately ended up introducing her to actor and comedian Danny Bonaduce instead.

In the extended DVD release, Carl mentions No Way Out, Hard Rain and Days of Thunder.

While looking through the attic, Derick and Jillian encounter a black cat. At first, they assume he is an unintelligent animal, but he tells them he is a professor, referencing the cat's voice actor, Patrick Stewart, who portrayed Professor X in the X-Men film franchise.

While searching for Muriel Goldman throughout the mansion, Brian and Stewie begin humming and singing the theme song to several television shows, including the CBS science fiction series Lost in Space, the CBS sitcom The Dick Van Dyke Show, and the ABC soap opera Dynasty. After discovering the Golden Globe Award underneath Tom Tucker's bed, Tucker begins to profess his innocence, with Peter then instructing him to "tell it to Mike Judge."

In the scene where Diane tells Lois about her conspiracy, Picasso's painting Le Rêve can be seen on the wall behind Diane. At the end of the episode, Seamus asks, "When we all see each other at school on Monday, are we still gonna be friends?" in a reference to The Breakfast Club.

== Reception ==
"And Then There Were Fewer" was broadcast on September 26, 2010, as a part of an animated television night on Fox, and was preceded by the season premiere of The Simpsons, and Family Guy creator and executive producer Seth MacFarlane's spin-off, The Cleveland Show. It was watched by 8.85 million viewers in its first half-hour, and concluded with a total of 9.41 million viewers in its second half-hour, according to Nielsen ratings, despite airing simultaneously with the season premiere of Desperate Housewives on ABC, the season premiere of The Amazing Race on CBS and Sunday Night Football on NBC. The episode also acquired a 4.3 and 4.7 rating in the 18–49 demographic, beating The Simpsons and The Cleveland Show in addition to significantly edging out both shows in total viewership. The episode's ratings were Family Guy's highest since the airing of the season eight episode "Family Goy".

"And Then There Were Fewer" received widespread acclaim from critics and viewers, with one critic calling the storyline "solidly funny, well plotted, and nearly perfectly executed". In a simultaneous review of the episodes of The Simpsons and The Cleveland Show that preceded the episode, The A.V. Club's Emily VanDerWerff commented that she enjoyed "the 'a bunch of people go to an isolated place and start getting killed' murder mystery subgenre", and that the episode "made fun of the conceits of the genre". In the conclusion of her review VanDerWerff called the episode "excellent and fun", and "full of surprisingly gorgeous animation and a nicely creepy feel that hung over all of the jokes" and rated it as a B+, the best rating between The Simpsons episode "Elementary School Musical" and The Cleveland Show episode "Harder, Better, Faster, Browner". Jason Hughes of TV Squad also praised the episode's writers for doing a "solid job of creating a genuine mystery throughout the hour, keeping us guessing as to who did it and what their motive may have been". Hughes went on to comment positively on the episode's numerous guest stars, and compared its portrayal of Diane Simmons to that of The Simpsons character Sideshow Bob. Natalie Zutter of Ology also praised the episode, calling it, "Surprisingly, the best of the evening." In the summary of her review, Zutter wrote that it was a "fun murder mystery that lets us see all our favorite Quahog folks", while continuing to wonder whether the characters who were killed off would remain dead.

"And Then There Were Fewer" has frequently been selected in lists of the show's best episodes. Tom Eames of entertainment website Digital Spy placed the episode at number 14 on his listing of the best Family Guy episodes in order of "yukyukyuks"—compiled in 2017 to honor the 18th anniversary of the show—and praised the interaction of characters who do not normally interact, writing, "We never thought we'd see Jillian's boyfriend Derek hanging out with Seamus the sea captain." He expressed his shock at the death of characters such as Muriel Goldman and Diane Simmons and noted, "That's one way to cut some dead wood." In 2019, Jesse Schedeen from IGN placed "And Then There Were Fewer" at number 12 on his list of the 20 best Family Guy episodes, to celebrate the show's 20th anniversary, stating, "It's always nice when an episode commits to its premise rather than drifting along and focusing more on cutaway humor. Another big part of the appeal with 'And Then There Were Fewer' is the fact that it features so many recurring characters, many of whom had never appeared alongside each other before." In that same year, Shawn S. Lealos from Screen Rant ranked the episode at number 4 on his listing of the best episode of every season of the series. Kevin Wong from GameSpot also named it among the 20 best Family Guy episodes.
