= Julius Wu =

American animation director

- Occupation: Director
- Years active: 1998–present

Julius Wu is an American animation director. He has directed several episodes of the animated series Family Guy.

Wu has also served as a director, assistant director and storyboard artist on King of the Hill and The Oblongs, before their cancellation.

== Family Guy ==
Wu joined Family Guy in 2007, after leaving King of the Hill in 2005. He has since directed multiple episodes, including:

- "The Tan Aquatic with Steve Zissou" (2007)
- "Believe It or Not, Joe's Walking on Air" (2007)
- "Baby Not on Board" (2008)
- "420" (2009)
- "Dog Gone" (2009)
- "Peter-assment" (2010)
- "Baby, You Knock Me Out" (2010)
- "Brothers & Sisters" (2011)
- "Stewie Goes for a Drive" (2011)
- "Be Careful What You Fish For" (2012)
- "Internal Affairs" (2012)
- "Jesus, Mary and Joseph!" (2012)
- "Bigfat" (2013)
- "Vestigial Peter" (2013)
- "Secondhand Spoke" (2014)
- "Turkey Guys" (2014)
- "#JOLO" (2015)
- "Brokeback Swanson" (2015)
- "Run, Chris, Run" (2016)
- "How the Griffin Stole Christmas" (2016)
- "Peter's Lost Youth" (2017)
- "The D in Apartment 23" (2017)
- "'Family Guy' Through the Years" (2018)
- "Dead Dog Walking" (2018)
- "No Giggity, No Doubt" (2019)
- #340: "Short Cuts" (2020)
- #357: "Pawtucket Pat" (2020)
