= Mayor Adam West =

Fictional character from the Family Guy franchise

Adam West
- Family Guy character
- Mayor West as depicted in the season 7 episode "Not All Dogs Go to Heaven"
- First appearance: "Fifteen Minutes of Shame"; April 25, 2000
- Last appearance: "Coma Guy"; April 26, 2020
- Created by: Seth MacFarlane; Steve Callaghan
- Based on: Adam West
- Designed by: Seth MacFarlane
- Voiced by: Adam West

In-universe information
- Full name: Adam West
- Occupation: Mayor of Quahog, Rhode Island
- Spouse: Carol West (wife)
- Nationality: American

Mayor Adam West or simply Mayor West, is a fictionalized version of actor Adam West in the American animated television series and franchise Family Guy. Depicted as the insane mayor of the town of Quahog, Rhode Island, where the show is set, he appeared on a recurring basis from his first appearance in the second season until his final appearance in the seventeenth season. Following his real life counterpart’s death, he was killed off.

== Characterization ==
Mayor West is characterized as an intense yet friendly, soft-spoken, childish, immature crackpot whose delusions often came at great expense and even danger to citizens of Quahog. His psychotic whims include dispatching the entire Quahog police department to Cartagena, Colombia, to search for the fictional character Elaine Wilder from the 1984 film Romancing the Stone, or wasting city council money on a solid gold statue of the Dig 'Em frog, and cementing coffins since he was afraid the dead will return as zombies. West was never revealed in the show as belonging to any specific political party, suggesting political ambiguity.

In the episode "420", he legalizes marijuana after listening to a song Brian sings ("A Bag o' Weed"), only to re-criminalize it a few days later when Brian is bribed to sing a song condemning the substance. In another episode, West prepares to sign a same-sex marriage ban only to be taken hostage in his office by an angry Brian who supports same-sex marriage and aims to thwart West's intentions. He was also a brainwashed Russian sleeper spy activated by the phrase "Gosh, that Italian family at the next table sure is quiet". In the episode "Brothers & Sisters", he marries Lois' sister Carol. The episode "Dr. C and the Women" suggests he is fully sane and his bizarre antics are a smokescreen to throw people off and cover up a dark, murderous side.

== Development ==
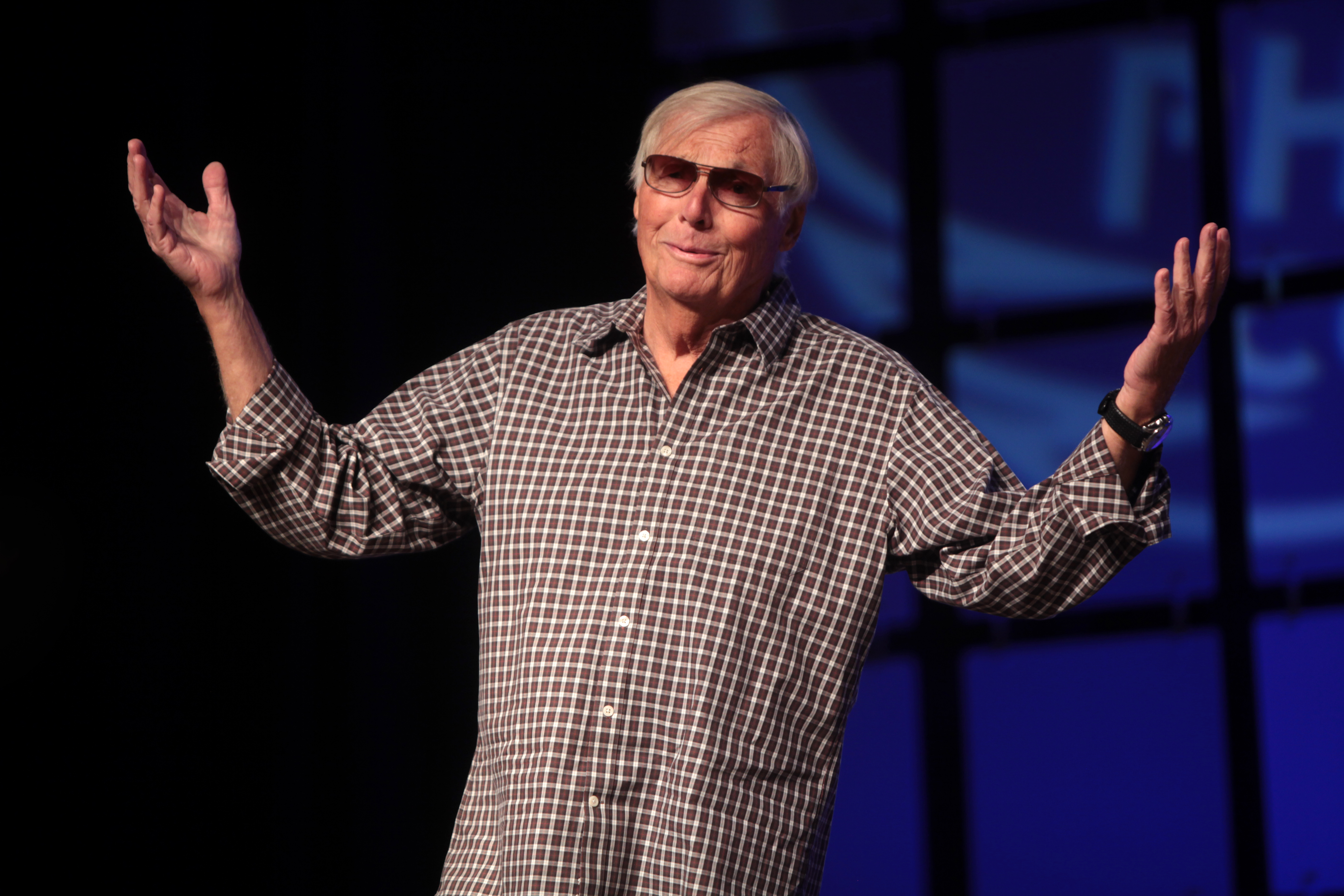
Adam West provided the voice for Mayor Adam West.

Family Guy creator Seth MacFarlane wrote several episodes of the cartoon series Johnny Bravo. West played a similarly odd rendition of himself in an episode written by MacFarlane, "Johnny Meets Adam West!", first broadcast in December 1997. In the episode, West's fictionalized persona displays similar deluded characteristics to the later Family Guy character, such as believing a race of megalomaniac mole-people lives under a local golf course. However, he dressed formally and behaved slightly similarly to his character in the 1960s series of Batman. MacFarlane found West's character and performance in Johnny Bravo so funny that he created a similar character for Family Guy.

The character we've created is kind of this alternate-universe Adam West where he's mayor of this town, and we deliberately have not made any references to Batman, because we like keeping that separate. It's the obvious place to go. We tried it; we thought it would be funny to do something different with the mayor of this town. People like Clint Eastwood and Martin Sheen who have taken whacks at this sort of thing — there's a precedent for it, actors getting into politics. He's the mayor, but he's this guy who clearly does not have it all together.

Following the real Adam West's death on June 9, 2017, Mayor West died offscreen in Family Guy as revealed in the episode "Adam West High". Following his death, MacFarlane said, "Family Guy has lost its mayor. He is irreplaceable". Producer Steve Callaghan told Entertainment Weekly that there were still five unaired episodes featuring West that would air in the upcoming season. Callaghan revealed that they had not decided how they were going to address the departure of West's character from the series, while also revealing that it is something they have been dealing with concerning the loss of Carrie Fisher in December 2016. Callaghan went on to say that both the departures of Fisher and West from the show will certainly reflect the importance that each of their characters and actors had within the series.

Starting in the episode "Wild Wild West", West's position as Mayor of Quahog was assumed by the character's western rural cousin, Wild West, who is voiced by Sam Elliott.
