= Cultural impact of Star Wars =

Star Wars saga in popular culture

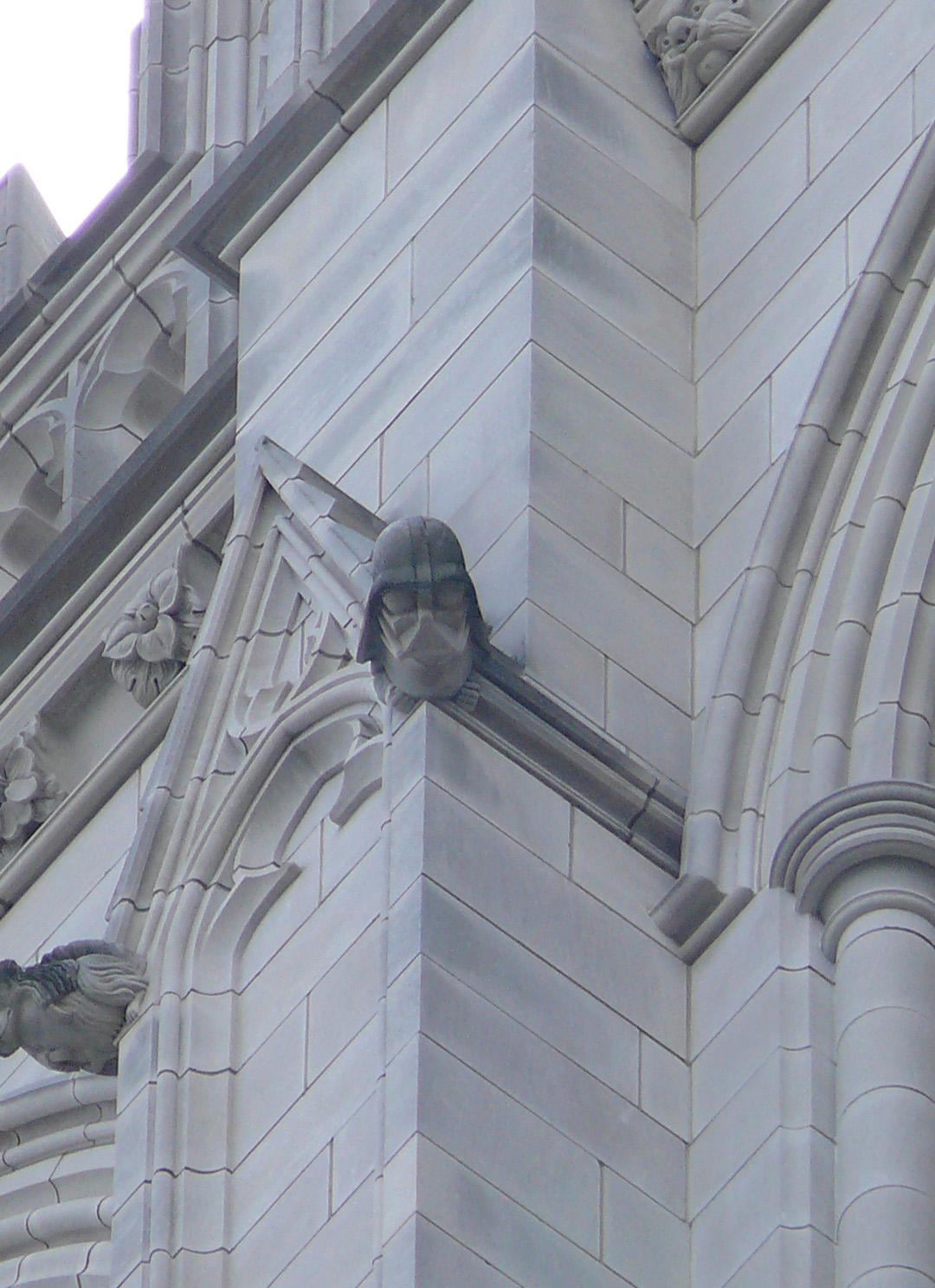
Darth Vader grotesque on the northwest tower of the Washington National Cathedral (Episcopal Church) in Washington, D.C.

The Star Wars franchise, which began with George Lucas's 1977 film, has had a significant impact on modern popular culture. Star Wars references are deeply embedded in popular culture; references to the main characters and themes of Star Wars are casually made in many English-speaking countries with the assumption that others will understand the reference. Darth Vader has become an iconic villain, while characters such as Luke Skywalker, Han Solo, Princess Leia, Chewbacca, C-3PO and R2-D2 have all become widely recognized characters around the world. Phrases such as "evil empire", "May the Force be with you", "Jedi mind trick", "I am your father" and "clanker" have become part of the popular lexicon. The original film was a cultural unifier, enjoyed by a wide spectrum of people.

Many efforts produced in the science fiction genre (particularly in filming) can now be seen to draw heavy influence and inspiration from the original Star Wars trilogy, as well as the magnitude of prequels, sequels, spin-offs, series, games, and texts that it spawned. Sounds, visuals, and even the iconic score of the films have become integral components in American society. The film helped launch the science fiction boom of the late 1970s and early 1980s, making science fiction films a blockbuster genre. This impact also made it a prime target for parody works and homages, with popular examples including Spaceballs, Family Guy's Laugh It Up, Fuzzball trilogy of specials, Seth Green's "Robot Chicken: Star Wars", Steve Oedekerk's "Thumb Wars", and Lucas's self-proclaimed favorite parody, Hardware Wars by Ernie Fosselius.

== Arts ==
=== Filmmaking history ===
==== Financial impact on Fox ====
20th Century Fox optioned Star Wars for its theatrical release. When it unexpectedly became that summer's blockbuster, earning over $100 million in its first three months, Fox's stock increased from $6 per share to $25 per share. Fox used the increased cash flow to purchase the Aspen skiing and Pebble Beach golf courses yet still declared excess profits in 1977. Income from Star Wars re-releases, sequels, and merchandising enriched the studio in the following decades. Star Wars helped Fox to change from an almost bankrupt production company to a thriving media conglomerate.

==== Impact on filmmaking ====
Star Wars fundamentally changed the aesthetics and narratives of Hollywood films, switching the focus of Hollywood-made films from deep, meaningful stories based on dramatic conflict, themes and irony to sprawling special-effects-laden blockbusters, as well as changing the Hollywood film industry in fundamental ways. Before Star Wars, special effects in films had not appreciably advanced since the 1950s. Star Wars was also important in the movement towards the use of computer-generated imagery in films. The commercial success of Star Wars created a boom in state-of-the-art special effects in the late 1970s. There was increased investment in special effects. Companies like Industrial Light & Magic and Digital Productions were created to provide them. The 1977 War Stars pioneered the genre pastiche, where several classic film genres are combined in one film. In Star Wars, the genres were science fiction, the Western, the war film, and the quasi-mystical epic. Along with Jaws, Star Wars started the tradition of the summer blockbuster film in the entertainment industry, where films open on many screens at the same time and profitable franchises are important. It created the model for the major film trilogy and showed that merchandising rights on a film could generate more money than the film itself.

Star Wars has often been discussed in relation to Joseph Campbell's concept of the monomyth the “hero’s journey”, popularized in The Hero with a Thousand Faces. The film's narrative closely follows many mythic and archetypal storytelling patterns, which contributed to its broad accessibility. While such structures long predate Star Wars, the film helped renew interest in mythic storytelling frameworks within popular cinema and screenwriting.

The plot of a second-season episode of The CW television series Legends of Tomorrow (2017), entitled "Raiders of the Lost Art", centered on the impact of George Lucas's films on the titular heroes.

==== Lucasfilm-produced mockumentaries ====
- Return of the Ewok (1982): a 24-minute fictional mockumentary, focusing on the decision of Warwick Davis to become an actor and act as Wicket the Ewok in Return of the Jedi.
- R2-D2: Beneath the Dome (2002): a 20-minute mockumentary, focusing on the "true" story of R2-D2's life. It was made as a side-project by some of the crew of Attack of the Clones, released on television in three installments, and later on DVD.

==== Parodies ====
The Star Wars saga has had a significant impact on modern American popular culture, both the films and characters have received official parodies in numerous films and television productions.

- The Simpsons, an animated TV series produced by 20th Century Animation (sister company to Lucasfilm and also part of The Walt Disney Company):
  - "Mayored to the Mob", a 1998 episode of the series, features multiple references to Star Wars, most centrally a plot in which Homer Simpson and Star Wars actor Mark Hamill face the threat of being trampled at a fan convention.
  - The Force Awakens from Its Nap. A 2021 parody short featuring Maggie Simpson, a celebration of Star Wars Day.
  - Plusaversary. A 2021 celebration of Disney+ Day featuring characters from The Simpsons and other The Walt Disney Company owned assets including Star Wars characters.
  - Rogue Not Quite One. A 2023 short film featuring Maggie Simpson, a celebration of Star Wars Day.
  - May the 12th Be with You. A 2024 short film, a celebration of Star Wars Day and Mother's Day.
- Robot Chicken has produced three television specials satirizing the Star Wars films ("Robot Chicken: Star Wars", "Episode II" and "Episode III"). The success of the specials led to the development animated parody series Star Wars Detours.
- Family Guy has also produced three parody episodes (collectively known as Laugh It Up, Fuzzball), each of which satirized the first three films in the series. The September 2007 sixth-season premiere, titled "Blue Harvest", was produced in dedication of the saga's 30th anniversary. This was followed by "Something, Something, Something, Dark Side", which parodies The Empire Strikes Back, and "It's a Trap!", which parodies Return of the Jedi. They originally were released direct-to-video on December 22, 2009, and December 21, 2010, then later aired on Fox May 23, 2010 (season eight, episode 20) and May 22, 2011 (season nine, episode 18) respectively.
- "Phineas and Ferb: Star Wars", also titled "Episode IV: May the Ferb Be with You", is an episode of the TV series Phineas and Ferb that aired in mid-2014, soon after Disney's acquisition of the franchise.
- "Star Mort Rickturn of the Jerri", the fourth season finale of the animated television series Rick and Morty premiered on May 31, 2020.
- Hardware Wars, a 13-minute 1978 spoof which Lucas has called his favorite Star Wars parody. The Last Jedi director Rian Johnson included a brief reference to the short movie; the scene in question depicts a robotic steam iron, which is briefly framed to resemble a landing spaceship.
- Spaceballs, a feature film by Mel Brooks, parodies the first Star Wars film, and features special effects by Lucas's Industrial Light & Magic.
- The films and television series of Kevin Smith reference Star Wars numerous times.
  - A scene in Smith's debut film Clerks centers upon the politics and ethics of the destruction of the two Death Stars in the first trilogy, which Lucas later addressed in his commentary track for Attack of the Clones.
  - A courtroom sequence in the series premiere of Clerks: The Animated Series sees Randal Graves intensely cross-examining George Lucas about the plot holes in Phantom Menace, and demanding a refund. After successfully attaining one, Randall does the same to directors Steven Spielberg, Joel Schumacher, Woody Allen, and Spike Lee.
  - In Smith's film Zack and Miri Make a Porno (2008), Zack (Seth Rogen) and Miri (Elizabeth Banks) decide to pay off their debts by producing and starring in a Star Wars-themed pornographic film titled Star Whores before changing it to a coffee house-themed film.
  - Trooper Clerks - In this parody of both Star Wars and the Clerks series by Studio Creations, convenience store clerks Dante Hicks and Randall Graves are stormtroopers depicted in locations such as the first Death Star and the planet Tatooine, discussing topics like whether Mallrats or Chasing Amy is the Smith film with the better story.
- Star Wars has been the subject of several parodies in the humorous magazine Mad, a publication that frequently publishes cartoon spoofs of Hollywood films. A parody called Star Roars was published in January 1978, featuring the magazine's mascot, Alfred E. Neuman, wearing a Darth Vader helmet.
- Pinky and the Brain - "Star Warners"
- Fanboys, a film about a group of friends anticipating the release of Star Wars: Episode I – The Phantom Menace
- "Ricktional Mortpoon's Rickmas Mortcation", the Rick and Morty sixth-season finale which includes many jabs and parodies of the franchise such as Morty dropping a lightsaber perfectly vertical and the President lashing out at Disney's new projects.
- Ninjago, a children's animated series based on a line of LEGO products, features many references to Star Wars. This can be attributed to series co-creator Tommy Andreason's admiration of the Star Wars franchise.
  - In the episode "Day of the Great Devourer", a character replies to another with "Never tell me the odds." This is a direct quote from Han Solo.
  - In the episode "Darkness Shall Rise", master Wu explicitly says "I fear there is a great disturbance in the force."
  - In the episode "Child's Play", the protagonists use "Illuma Swords" to defeat an attacking creature. These weapons are extremely similar to lightsabers. They are later used in the episodes "The Day Ninjago Stood Still" and "The Corridor of Elders" by the owner of a comic book store.
  - The special episode Day of the Departed focuses on a portal known as the "Rift of Return" which opens once every 3,721 years. This is a reference to The Empire Strikes Back, when C-3PO says that the odds of navigating an asteroid field are 3,720 to 1.
  - The relationship between the characters Lloyd and Garmadon is a major parallel to that of Luke Skywalker and Darth Vader, with the Overlord serving as the Emperor. This culminates in the season Crystalized, when the Overlord tortures Lloyd with electricity from his hands and says "All that has happened was by my design", a rephrasing of the Emperor's line "Everything that has transpired has done so according to my design".
- Oggy and the Cockroaches: The Movie, an animated movie directed and written by Olivier Jean-Marie (Based on Xilam’s (formerly Gaumont’s) animated silent comedy TV series of the same name created by Jean-Yves Raimbaud), features a CGI segment "Oggy-Wan Kenoggy". Oggy, the film's protagonist, parodies Obi-Wan Kenobi, while Bob, who was a minor character in the other segments, plays the role of Darth Vader, and Jack portrays the character Han Solo.
- The 1980 kaiju film Gamera: Super Monster involved a spaceship and its first appearance identical to that of Star Destroyer in the 1977 film, while its video game adaptation Star Wars (1987) introduced a character based on Gyaos, an adversary of Gamera.

== Documentaries ==
- The Making of Star Wars
- SP FX: The Empire Strikes Back
- Classic Creatures: Return of the Jedi
- From Star Wars to Jedi: The Making of a Saga
- Empire of Dreams: The Story of the Star Wars Trilogy
- Star Wars Tech
- Star Wars: The Legacy Revealed
- Science of Star Wars

=== Fan documentaries ===
- Elstree 1976
- I Am Your Father
- The People vs. George Lucas
- Plastic Galaxy
- The Prequels Strike Back: A Fan's Journey

== Video games ==
Anakin's charred body - referencing Revenge of the Sith - is featured in 2006's The Elder Scrolls: Oblivion and 2025's remaster. It can be found when players enter the first Oblivion portal.

Darth Vader, as well as Yoda and Starkiller, appear as playable characters in the 2008 fighting game Soulcalibur IV.

The lightsaber appears as a reskinned bat for the Scout in Team Fortress 2. It was added to the game in October 2015.

Darth Maul appears in Tony Hawk's Pro Skater 3 as a guest skater.

Fallout New Vegas features the burnt bodies of Uncle Owen and Aunt Beru in Nipton. With the Wild Wasteland trait, players can find two skeletons outside a burned home with their names.

The Sims 4: Journey to Batuu is an expansion pack released in September 2020. The pack lets players meet Kylo Ren, Rey, and others. Players also get the chance to join the Rebels, Empire, or Scoundrels.

Fall Guys teamed up with Star Wars for a May 4 promotion. Costumes were released that allowed players to dress as Boba Fett, Han Solo, and other characters.

Players are able to obtain a two-sided lightsaber in the 2022 game Goat Simulator 3. By playing the Imperial March on church bells, a mausoleum opens and allows a six-bladed lightsaber to be picked up.

== Science ==
=== Impact on aeronautics ===
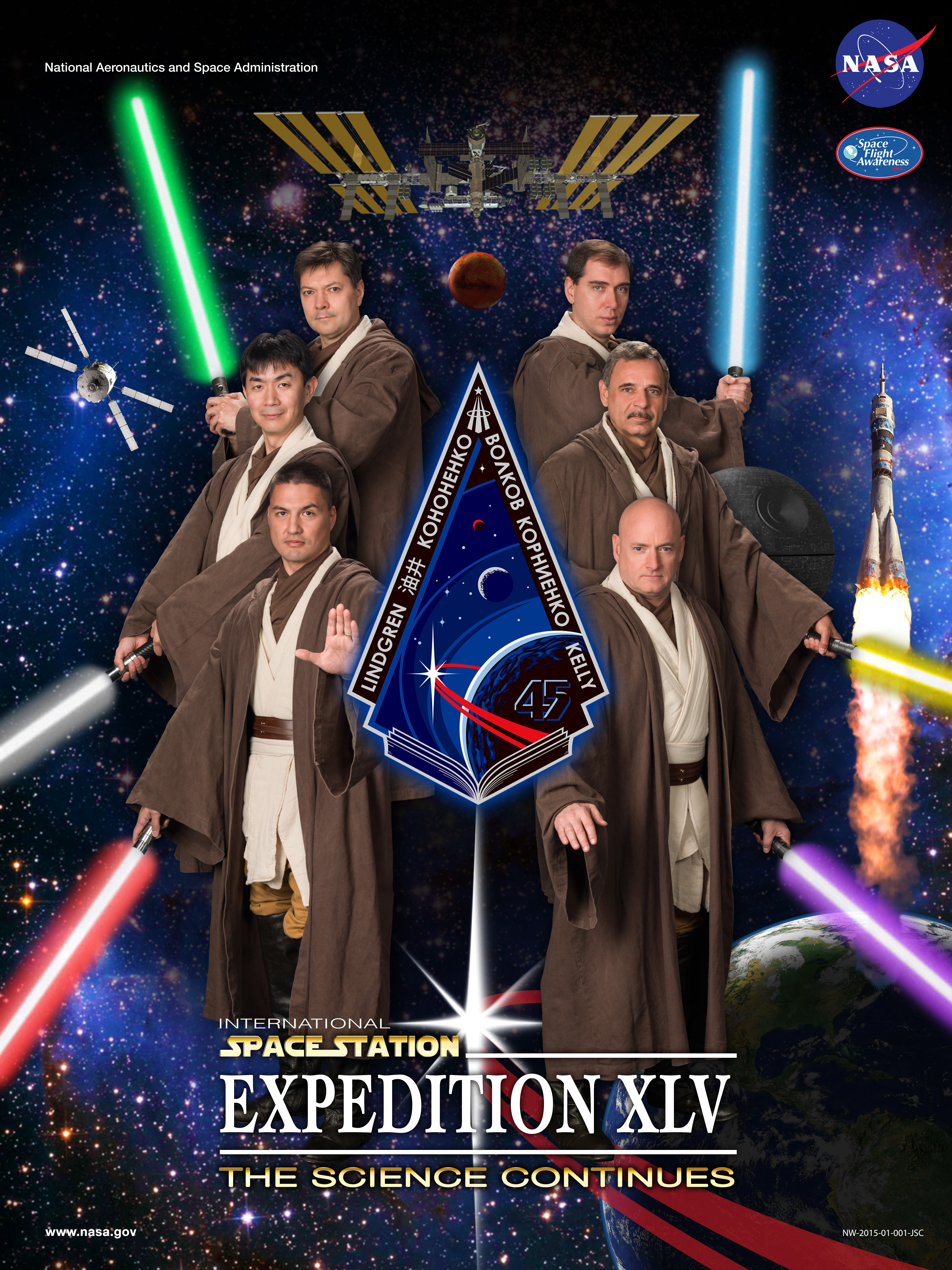
Expedition 45 Return of the Jedi crew poster

The Smithsonian National Air and Space Museum had an exhibition called Star Wars: The Magic of Myth. It was an exhibition of original production models, props, costumes, and characters from the first three Star Wars films. In October 2007, NASA launched a Space Shuttle carrying an original lightsaber into orbit. The prop handle had been used as Luke Skywalker's lightsaber in Return of the Jedi. After spending two weeks in orbit, it was brought back to Earth on November 7, 2007, to be returned to its owner, George Lucas.

The first successfully launched space-rocket, to be sent by the private spaceflight company SpaceX, was named the Falcon 1. Elon Musk used the word "falcon" within the name of the space-rocket, as a reference to the Millennium Falcon from Star Wars. The Falcon 1's success led to the fabrication of updated versions of the space rocket, in what became known as the Falcon family of space-rockets. The Falcon 1 has since been retired, in favor of the Falcon 9.

The spacecraft LICIACube, a part of DART mission, is equipped with two optical cameras, dubbed LUKE and LEIA.

== Politics and religion ==
=== Political impact ===
When Ronald Reagan proposed the Strategic Defense Initiative (SDI), a system of lasers and missiles meant to intercept incoming ICBMs, the plan was quickly labeled "Star Wars", implying that it was science fiction and linking it to Reagan's acting career. According to Frances FitzGerald, Reagan was annoyed by this, but Assistant Secretary of Defense Richard Perle told colleagues that he "thought the name was not so bad."; "'Why not?' he said. 'It's a good movie. Besides, the good guys won.'" This gained further resonance when Reagan described the Soviet Union as an "evil empire".

In television commercials, public interest group critics of the SDI program deridingly used the nickname "Star Wars" to refer to the orbital missile defense project; supporters also started to adopt the moniker. Lucasfilm originally sued to try to enjoin this usage of its trademark, and lost. Explaining its decision, the court said,

When politicians, newspapers, and the public generally use the phrase star wars for their convenience, in parody or descriptively to further a communication of their views on SDI, plaintiff has no rights as owner of the mark to prevent this use of STAR WARS. ... Since Jonathan Swift's time, creators of fictional worlds have seen their vocabulary for fantasy appropriated to describe reality. Trademark laws regulate unfair competition, not the parallel development of new dictionary meanings in the everyday give and take of human discourse.

When Margaret Thatcher won the 1979 United Kingdom general election held on May 3, the Tories took out a newspaper ad that read "May the Fourth Be with You Maggie. Congratulations."

On May 4, 1995, during a defence debate in the UK parliament, MP Harry Cohen related the Star Wars Day joke: "May 4 be with you".

The holographic video effect associated with Star Wars served as a technological tool for CNN during its 2008 Election Night coverage. CNN reporter Jessica Yellin and musician will.i.am looked as though they were in the network's New York City studios talking face-to-face with hosts Anderson Cooper and Wolf Blitzer, when in reality, they were in Chicago at Barack Obama's rally. The process involved Yellin and will.i.am standing in front of a blue screen in a special tent, while being shot by 35 HD cameras.

On March 1, 2013, American President Barack Obama spoke on the sequestration debate. He said that some people expect him to do a "Jedi mind meld" on the Republicans who refuse to deal.

In the 2014 Ukrainian presidential elections, the Internet Party of Ukraine tried to nominate a man named Darth Vader; but his registration was refused because his real identity could not be verified. A man named Darth Vader was a candidate at May 25 2014 Kyiv mayoral election and the Odesa mayoral election of the same day for the same party. In the 2014 Ukrainian parliamentary election the Internet Party let Darth Vader along other Star Wars characters such as Chewbacca, Padmé Amidala, and Yoda run for seats in the Ukrainian parliament. In the election the party failed to clear the 5% election threshold (it got 0.36% of the votes) and also did not win a constituency seat and thus no parliamentary seats.

In 2015, as a part of the decommunization process in Ukraine, a statue of a Vladimir Lenin was modified into a monument to Darth Vader at the territory of Pressmash plant in Odesa.

In the 2020 Odesa local election, a person called Darth Vader was again a candidate for mayor of Odesa (nominated by Darth Vader Bloc). He scored 0.48% of the total votes cast.

=== Religion (Jediism) ===
A real-life religion based on Star Wars called Jediism follows a modified version of the Jedi Code, and they believe in the concept of The Force as an energy field of all living things, which "surrounds us... penetrates us" and "binds the galaxy together", as is depicted within Star Wars movies, although without the fictional elements such as telekinesis. Many citizens around the world answer list their religion as Jedi during their countries respective Census, among them Australia and New Zealand getting high percentages. A petition in Turkey to build a Jedi Temple within a university, also got international media attention.

In England and Wales, 390,127 people (almost 0.8%) stated their religion as Jedi on their 2001 Census forms, surpassing Sikhism, Judaism and Buddhism, and making it the fourth largest reported religion in the country.

== Aircraft livery ==
Several airlines around the world formerly featured or currently features a special Star Wars themed jet on one of its aircraft.

=== Gallery ===
Star Wars themed jets

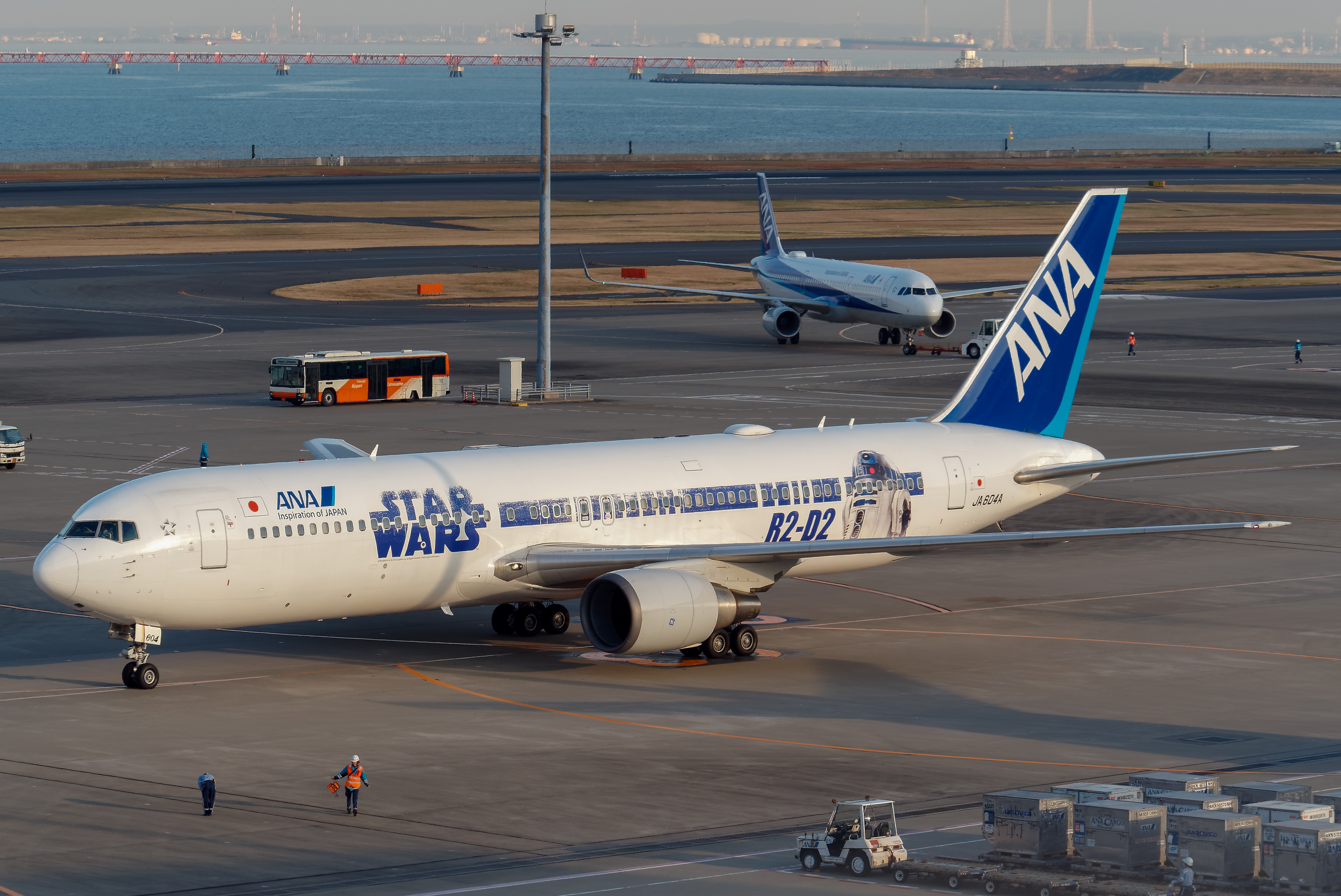
ANA Boeing 767-300ER

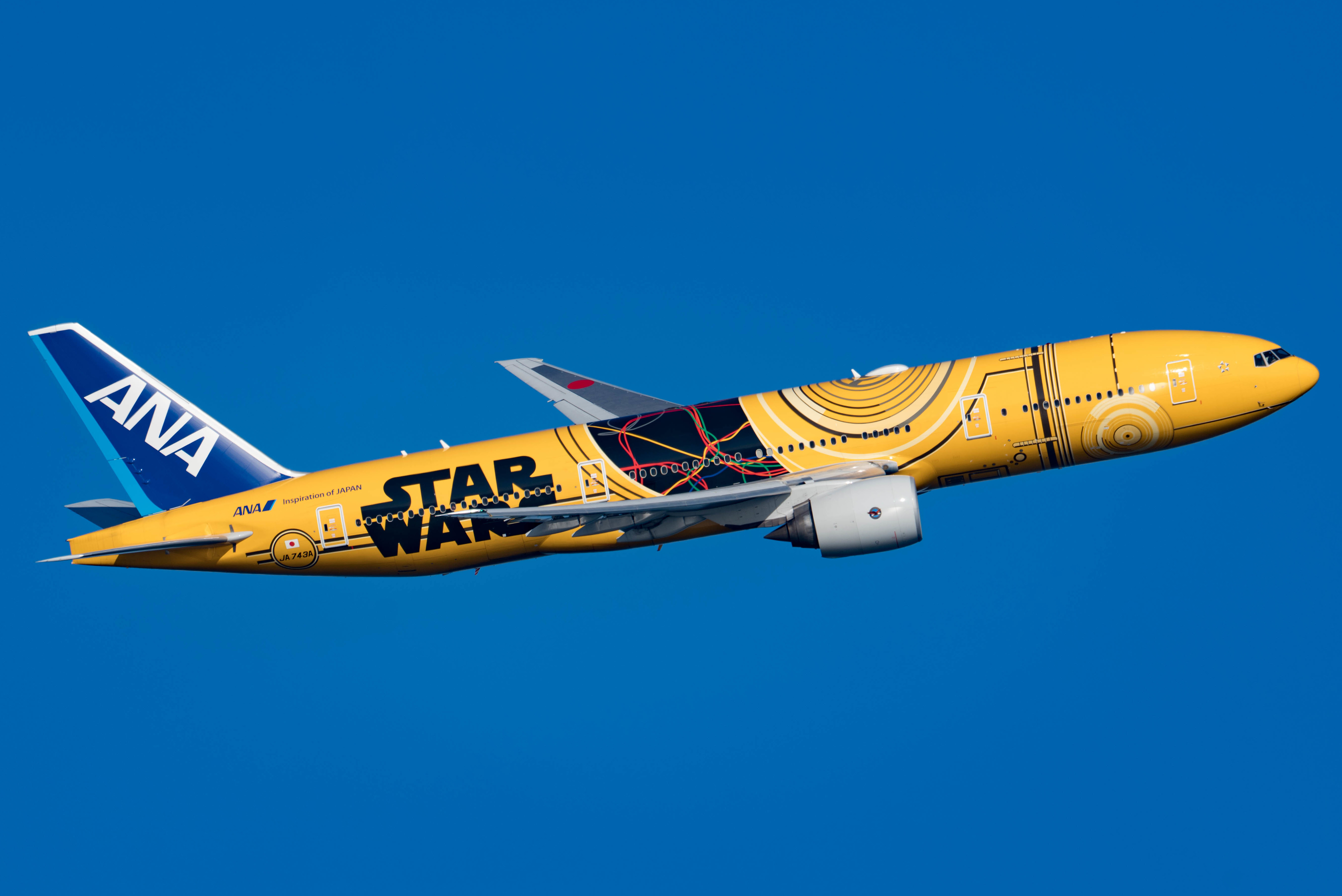
ANA Boeing 777-200ER featuring the C-3PO

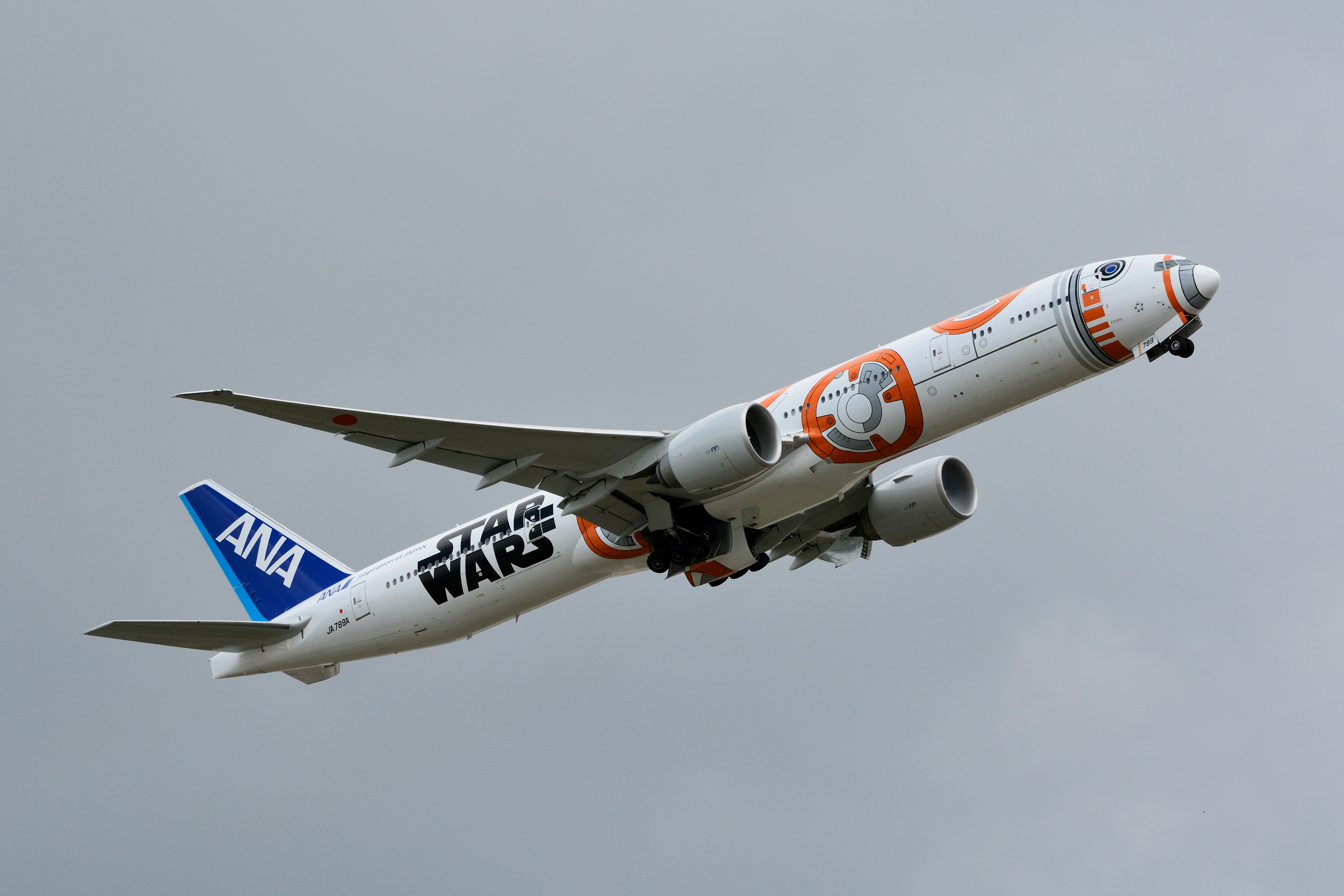
ANA Boeing 777-300ER featuring the BB-8

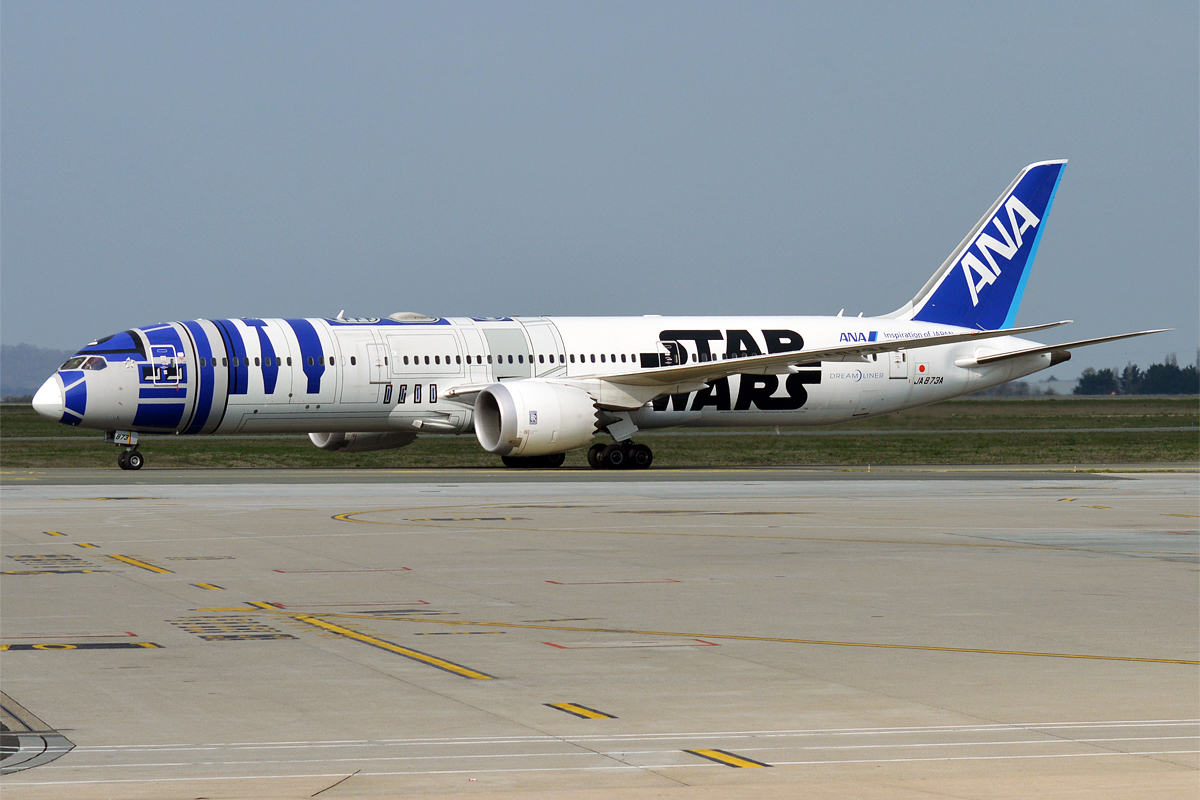
ANA Boeing 787-9 featuring the R2-D2

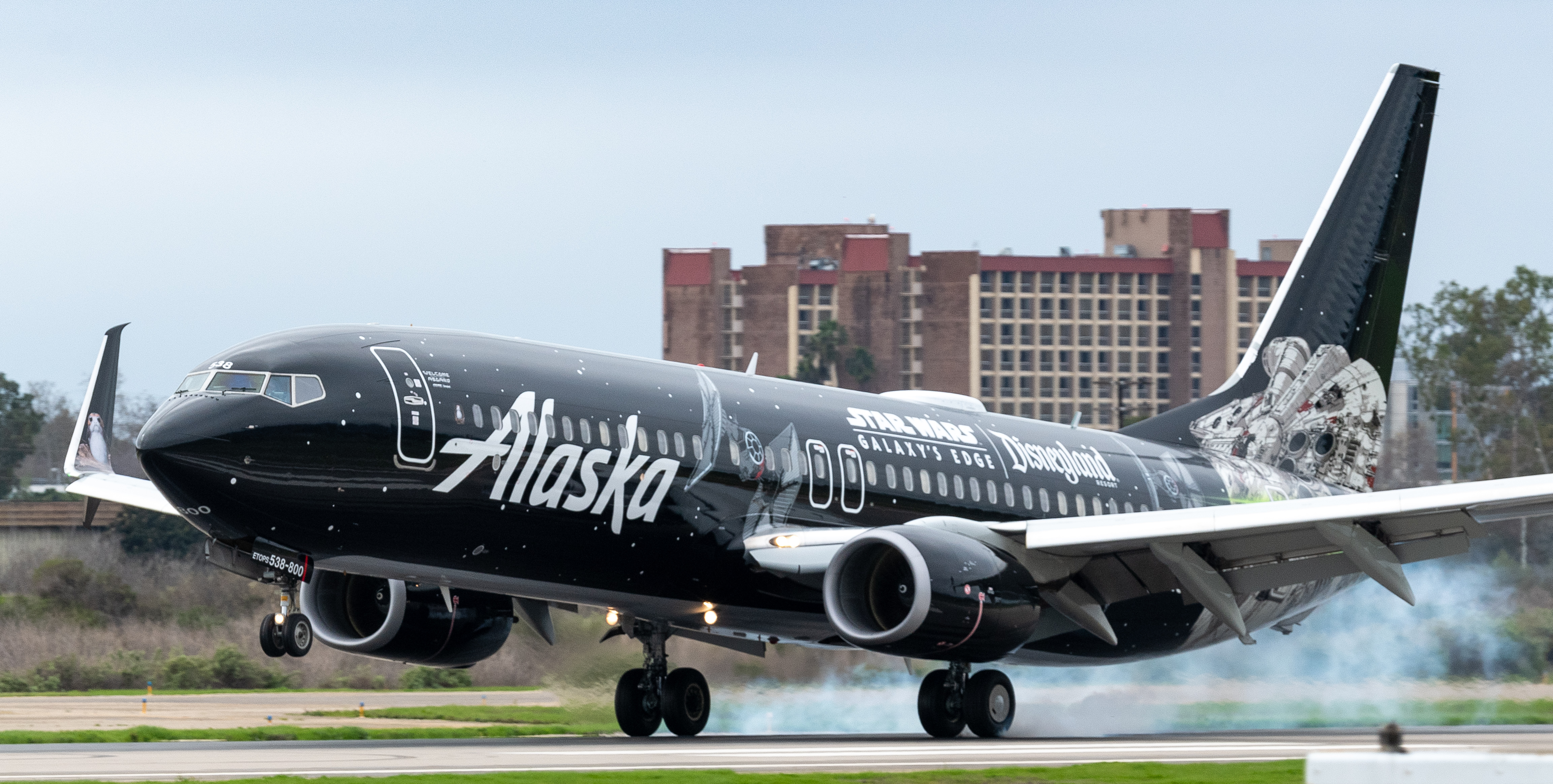
Alaska Airlines Boeing 737-800

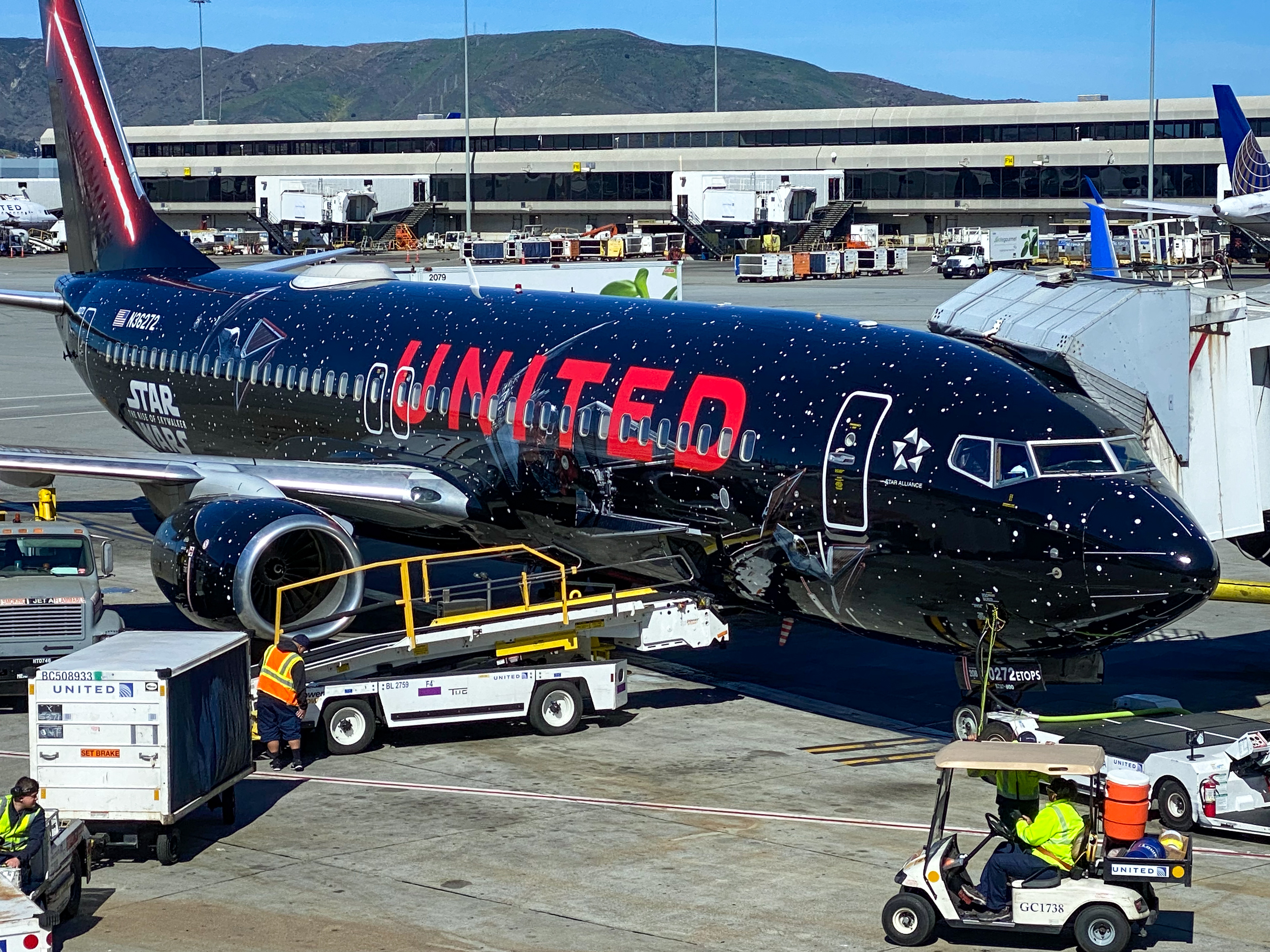
United Airlines Boeing 737-800

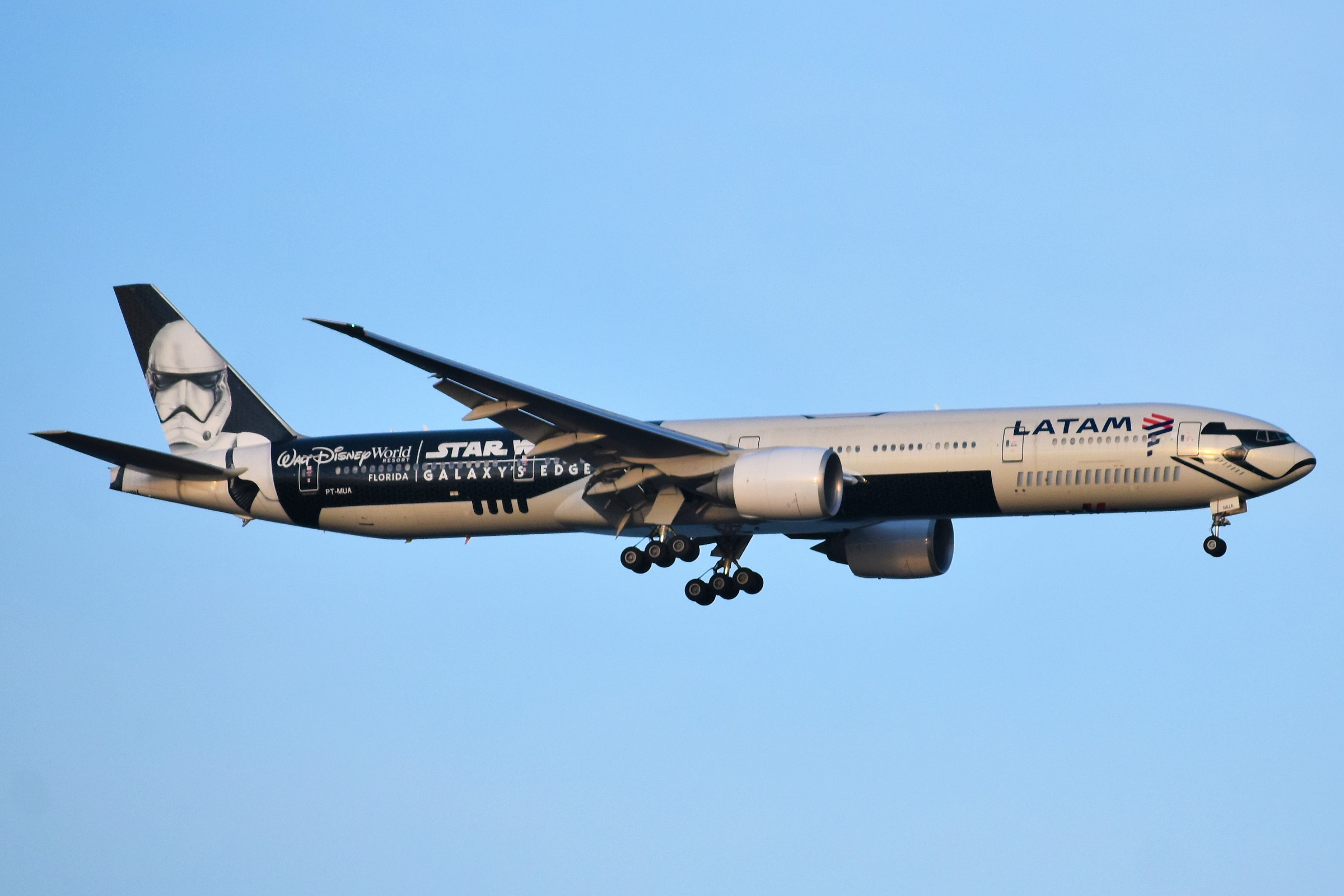
LATAM Brasil Boeing 777-300ER featuring the Stormtrooper

== Other ==
Between 2002 and 2004, museums in Japan, Singapore, Scotland and England showcased the Art of Star Wars, an exhibit describing the process of making the original Star Wars trilogy.

In 2013, Star Wars became the first major motion picture translated into the Navajo language.

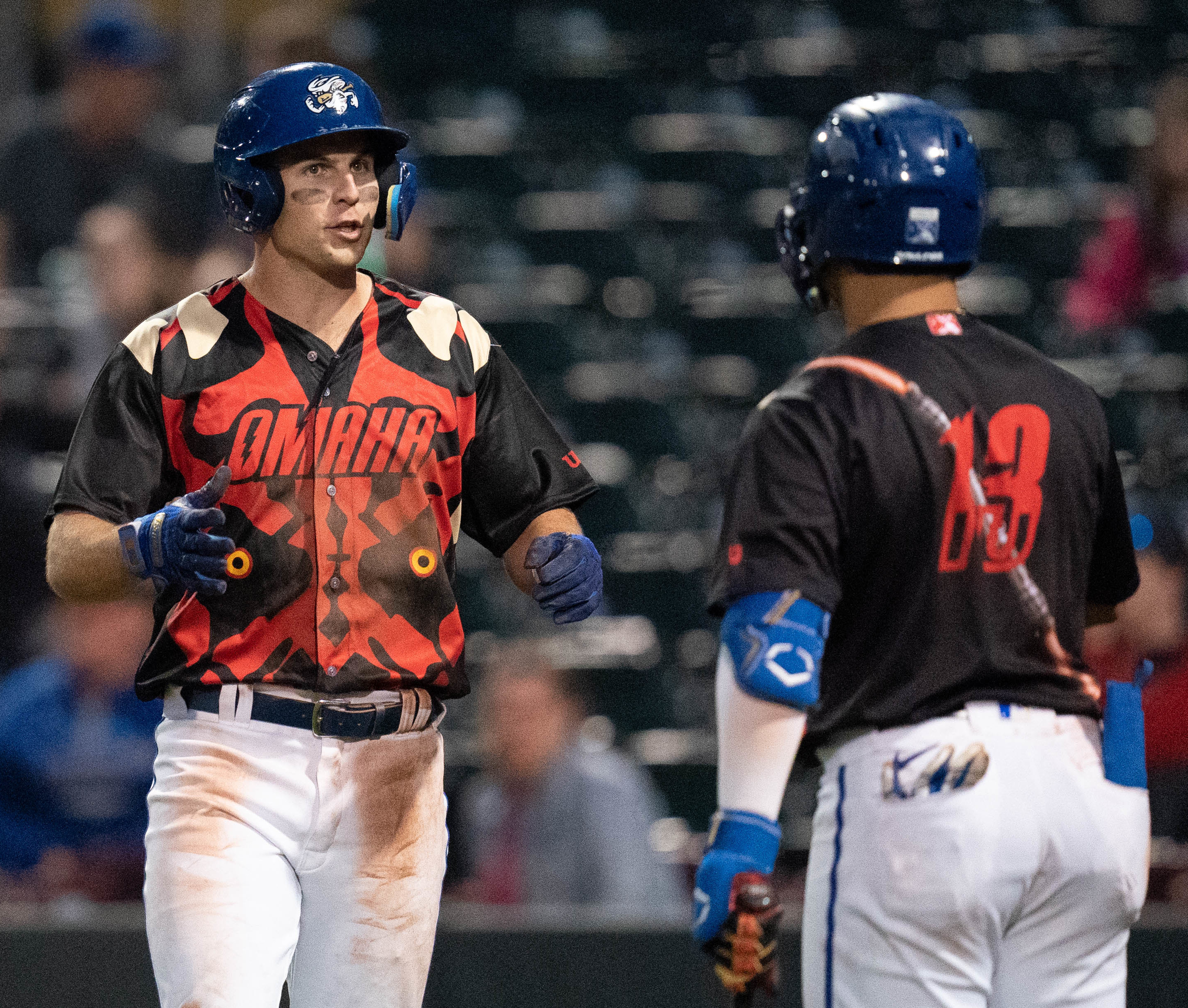
Two Omaha Storm Chasers Minor League Baseball players wearing uniforms featuring Darth Maul's face on front (left) and lightsaber on back (right) during their Star Wars Night in 2022

Professional sports teams in the United States and Canada regularly hold Star Wars-themed promotional nights. In 2015, Star Wars-themed Major League Baseball (MLB) games had average higher attendance than typical MLB games. Star Wars promotional nights in minor league sports events often feature teams wearing Star Wars-inspired uniform designs. Outside of Star Wars-themed games, North American sports teams often play "The Imperial March" over their public address systems while opposing teams are being introduced.

Several organizations worldwide teach lightsaber combat as a competitive sport, instructing on techniques interpreted from the films, and using life-size replica weapons composed of highly durable plastic that emit lights and sounds. One of these organizations being ludosport.

During the 2012 Emerald City Comicon in Seattle, Washington, several prominent cartoon voice actors, consisting of Rob Paulsen, Jess Harnell, John DiMaggio, Maurice LaMarche, Tara Strong and Kevin Conroy, performed a parody reading of A New Hope as a radio play in each of their signature voice roles; i.e. Paulsen and Harnell as Yakko and Wakko Warner from Animaniacs, Strong as Bubbles from The Powerpuff Girls and Timmy Turner from The Fairly OddParents, LaMarche and DiMaggio as Kif Kroker and Bender from Futurama, and Conroy narrating as Batman.

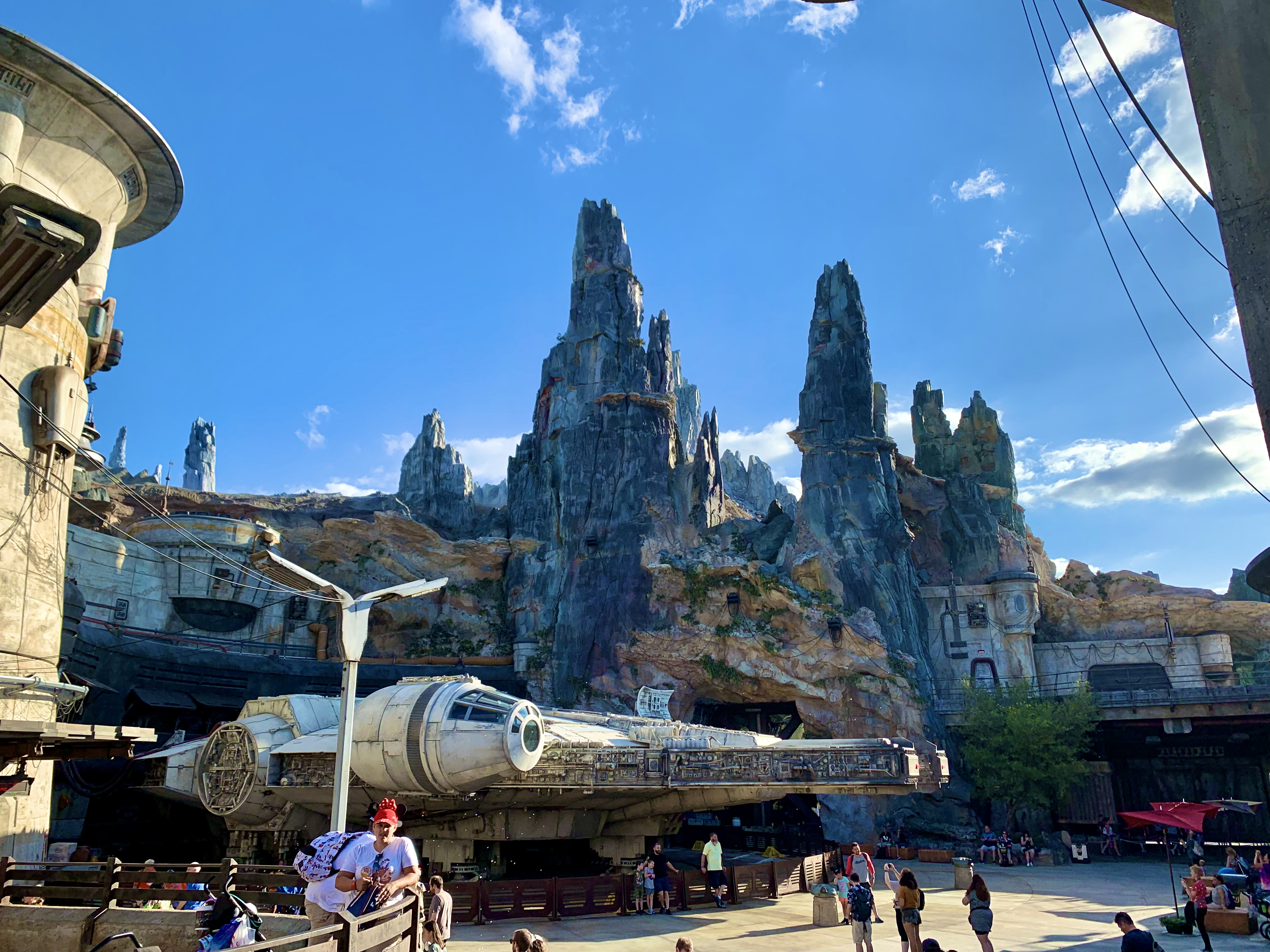
Millennium Falcon in Star Wars: Galaxy's Edge at Disney's Hollywood Studios

After Disney acquired Star Wars, they opened Galaxy's Edge, a Star Wars-themed area, in both Disneyland and Disney World in May 2019 and August 2019, respectively. Notable attractions include the Millennium Falcon and Oga's Cantina.

"Star Wars bar" has entered the English language vernacular meaning a less desirable bar or pub. This is because the "Mos Eisley Cantina", and the events depicted therein during the original Star Wars film, is a well known cultural reference for the term to have become useful in everyday conversation.

In 2023, a Judge in the Akron Municipal Court announced that he would be officiating Star Wars-themed weddings on the 4th of May 2023. The celebrations included Star Wars: A New Hope in the background and Star Wars–inspired vows.

== See also ==
- False memory § Mandela effect
- Star Wars and History
- These Aren't The Droids You're Looking For
