= Blue Harvest =

- Family Guy episode
- Episode poster parody of Star Wars "Style C" originally by Tom Chantrell
- Episode no.: Season 6 Episode 1
- Directed by: Dominic Polcino
- Written by: Alec Sulkin; George Lucas (1977 Screenplay)
- Editing by: Gilbert Taylor; Richard Chew; Richard Williams
- Production code: 5ACX16/5ACX22
- Original air date: September 23, 2007

Guest appearances
- Chevy Chase as Clark Griswold; Beverly D'Angelo as Ellen Griswold; Mick Hucknall as himself; Rush Limbaugh as Galactic political commentator and Red Six; Judd Nelson as John Bender; Helen Reddy as herself; Don Tai as Thai TIE Fighter pilot; Leslie Nielsen as Dr. Barry Rumack (archive audio)

Episode chronology
← Previous "Meet the Quagmires"	Next → "Movin' Out (Brian's Song)"
- Family Guy season 6

"Blue Harvest" is the season premiere of the sixth season of the American animated television series Family Guy, and the first part of the series' Laugh It Up, Fuzzball trilogy. It originally aired on Fox in the United States on September 23, 2007. The episode is a retelling and parody of the 1977 blockbuster film Star Wars, recasting the show's characters as Star Wars characters, created with permission from Lucasfilm on the condition that the characters look exactly as they do in the movies. The plot follows Peter as he retells the story of Star Wars while the electricity is out in their house.

The title is a reference to the working title of Return of the Jedi. The episode was written by Alec Sulkin and directed by Dominic Polcino, and guest-stars Chevy Chase, Beverly D'Angelo, Mick Hucknall, Rush Limbaugh, and Judd Nelson. The episode also includes recurring voice actors Lori Alan, Adam West, Ralph Garman, Danny Smith, John Viener, Steve Callaghan, Kirker Butler, Mark Hentemann, Johnny Brennan, Jon Benjamin, Phil LaMarr, and Wally Wingert. It was viewed by 10.86 million viewers on its original broadcast.

== Plot ==
The power goes out while the Griffins are watching television, and they are left with no other form of entertainment. While they wait for the power to return, Peter decides to retell the story of Star Wars, beginning with "Part IV".

A Rebel ship is captured by a Star Destroyer. On the ship are the droids C-3PO (Quagmire), R2-D2 (Cleveland) and the rebel leader Princess Leia (Lois). While the ship is boarded by stormtroopers, Leia tries to send an MPEG to Obi-Wan Kenobi through R2, but encounters so many complications that R2 offers to deliver the message himself. Leia is captured by Darth Vader (Stewie) while R2 and 3PO flee to Tatooine in an escape pod, where they are captured by Jawas (one of whom is Mort).

The droids are sold to a family of moisture farmers, whose nephew Luke Skywalker (Chris) wishes to join the Rebellion and fight the Empire. While cleaning the droids, Luke stumbles upon Leia's message inside R2, who later decides to leave the farm. Luke and C-3PO pursue him, but are attacked by Sand People. Luke is knocked out by one of them (Opie) and is found by Obi-Wan Kenobi (Herbert), who takes them to his hut. Leia's message explains that R2 contains the plans to the Death Star, which must be sent to her father on her home planet of Alderaan and asks Obi-Wan to help. Obi-Wan tells Luke that he must learn the ways of the Force and accompany him to Alderaan, and gives him his own lightsaber. Realizing that the Empire must be looking for the droids, Luke returns home to discover that his home has been destroyed and his aunt and uncle killed, along with John Williams.

Luke, Obi-Wan, and the droids travel to Mos Eisley to find a pilot to take them to Alderaan. At a local cantina, they hire smuggler Han Solo (Peter) and his Wookiee co-pilot Chewbacca (Brian), who agree to take them with their ship, the Millennium Falcon. The group is soon spotted by stormtroopers and they flee into space, evading the pursuing Star Destroyers before jumping into hyperspace. Leia is imprisoned on the Death Star, where commanding officer Grand Moff Tarkin (Adam West) has Alderaan destroyed. The Millennium Falcon exits hyperspace and is captured by the Death Star's tractor beam and brought into its hangar bay. Disguising themselves as stormtroopers, Han and Luke along with Chewbacca set off to rescue the captive Princess while Obi-Wan goes to shut off the tractor beam and R2 and C3PO stay behind. Han, Luke and Chewie rescue Leia, and the four of them dive into a garbage chute to escape stormtroopers and find a couch in the garbage masher below. As they flee the Death Star, Obi-Wan turns off the tractor beam before being confronted by Darth Vader in a lightsaber duel. Vader strikes Obi-Wan down as the others board the Falcon, taking the couch with them.

The Falcon journeys to the Rebel base at Yavin IV, where the Rebels analyze the Death Star plans and find a weakness. Luke joins the assault team while Han collects his reward for the rescue and prepares to leave. The Rebel fighters (who also include Simply Red, Helen Reddy, Redd Foxx, Red Buttons, the Red October and an anthropomorphic pack of Big Red gum) attack the Death Star but suffer heavy losses during the assault. During his run, Luke hears Obi-Wan's voice telling him to use the Force, and he turns off his targeting computer. Vader appears with his own group of fighters, and is about to fire at Luke's starfighter when Han arrives in the Falcon and attacks Vader and his men, sending Vader's ship off into space. Guided by the Force, Luke fires into the port, destroying the Death Star, and he returns to the Rebel base with his friends to celebrate their victory.

Back at the Griffins' home, Peter wraps up the story as the power comes back on. Everyone thanks Peter for keeping them entertained, although Chris points out that Robot Chicken already told that story. Peter dismisses and mocks the show, and Chris storms off.

== Production ==
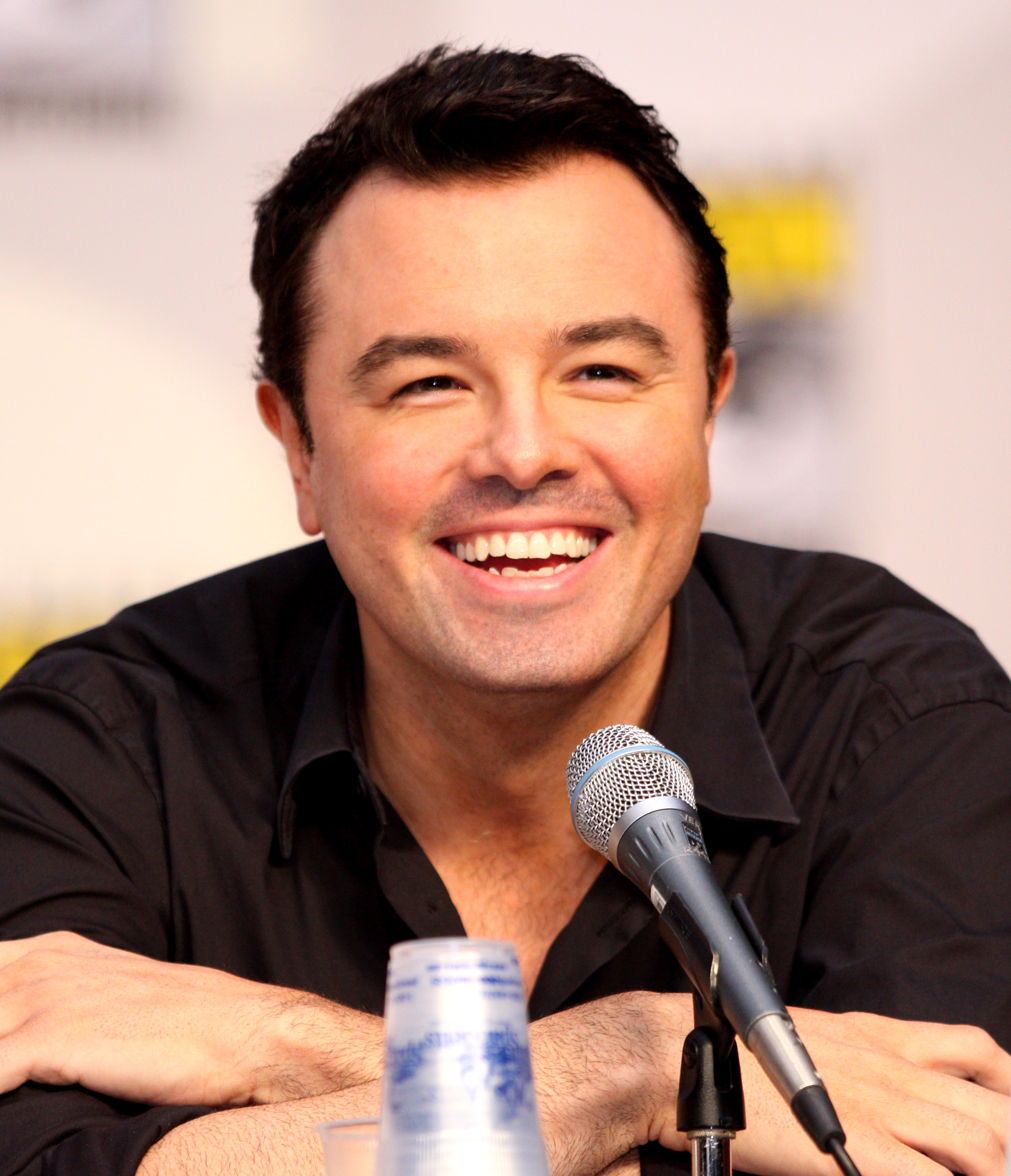
Family Guy creator Seth MacFarlane served as executive producer for the episode.

"Blue Harvest" originally aired on September 23, 2007, as the premiere for the sixth season of Family Guy. The episode was written by Alec Sulkin, who has been with the show since the fourth season. It was directed by series veteran Dominic Polcino, who has been directing for the series since its first season. Series regulars Peter Shin and James Purdum served as supervising directors. The episode's music was composed by Walter Murphy.

Family Guy creator Seth MacFarlane explained that the reason they made a parody of Star Wars in particular was because the show's staff members were huge fans of the films. They also chose Star Wars because Lucasfilm allowed it. MacFarlane stated that creating parodies based on Raiders of the Lost Ark or Star Trek II: The Wrath of Khan was originally considered, but they assumed they would be unable to gain permission from the owners of those properties (in this case Paramount Pictures). Lucasfilm gave only one condition: that the characters had to look exactly like they do in the films.

Clips of the episode were shown to audience members at Star Wars Celebration IV, where a panel was hosted by MacFarlane, Sulkin and Polcino, and executive producer David A. Goodman. The episode was also previewed at the 2007 Comic-Con International.

In addition to the regular cast, actors Chevy Chase, Beverly D'Angelo, and Judd Nelson, musician Mick Hucknall, singer Helen Reddy, and political commentator Rush Limbaugh made guest appearances. Recurring guest voice actors Phil LaMarr, Johnny Brennan, Jon Benjamin, Lori Alan, Adam West, Ralph Garman, writer Danny Smith, writer John Viener, executive producer Steve Callaghan, Kirker Butler, executive producer Mark Hentemann writer Wally Wingert and Alec Sulkin also made minor appearances in the episode.

== Cultural references ==
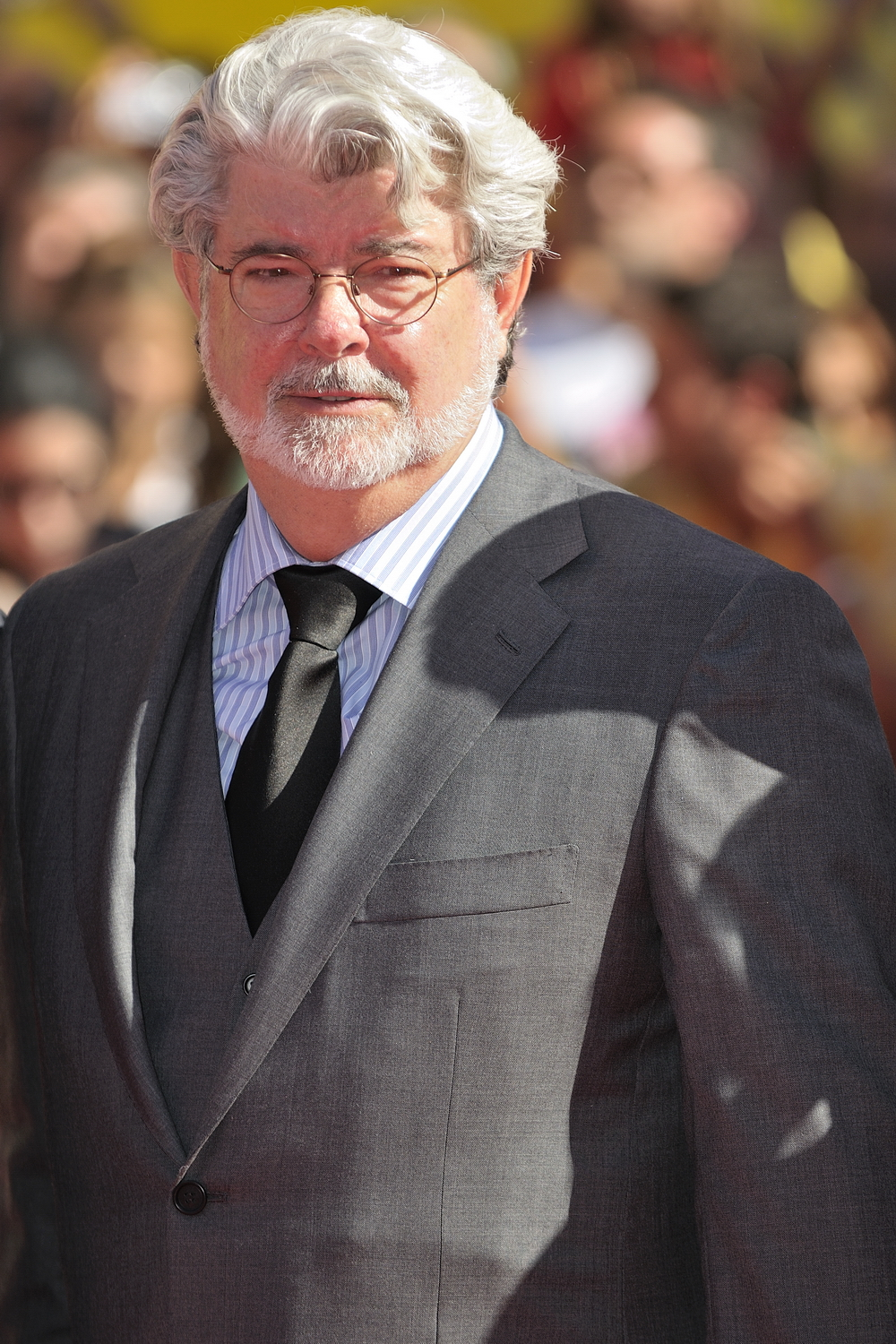
The episode was a retelling of George Lucas' Star Wars Episode IV: A New Hope.

"Blue Harvest" contains many references to popular culture, particularly to the Star Wars film series. Most of the episode itself is a retelling of George Lucas' film Star Wars. The episode's name is a reference to the fake working title for the production of Return of the Jedi.

When Peter is about to begin telling the story he says that it is about "love and loss, fathers and sons, and the foresight to retain international merchandising rights", a reference to the fact that 20th Century Fox gave those rights to Lucasfilm. During the text scrawl actress Angelina Jolie, her film Gia, and the television channel HBO are mentioned.

One of the Star Destroyers displays a bumper sticker reading "Bush – Cheney" a reference to United States President George W. Bush and his Vice President Dick Cheney's 2004 re-election campaign. When Luke is watching the sunset, he breaks the fourth wall by introducing Star Wars composer John Williams and the London Symphony Orchestra, who have been scoring the scene, in a parody of a scene from Blazing Saddles featuring Count Basie and his orchestra. Luke then asks the orchestra to play the theme of The People's Court. Later in the episode when Luke finds his uncle and aunt murdered, he also finds that Williams and the entire orchestra have been killed as well; this saddens Luke, since the episode will now have to be scored by composer Danny Elfman before Luke decapitates him with his lightsaber. While searching for R2-D2, Luke listens to conservative political commentator Rush Limbaugh's radio show, in which Limbaugh says that the "liberal galactic media is saying that the planet Hoth is melting".

One of the band members that plays at the cantina asks for any song request and then he subtly responds to his own question by saying "play that same song," a reference to the fact that the song being played in the film scene lasts a long time.

Obi-Wan sings a rendition of "(I've Had) The Time of My Life" from the film Dirty Dancing, in case he never sees Luke again. In a fight with a group of TIE fighters, Luke asks the origins behind their name; the following scene then shows that the pilots are from Thailand. Leslie Nielsen's character from the movie Airplane! wishes Han good luck during their encounter with the TIE fighters. When seeking how to destroy the Death Star, the rebels look at an instructional video hosted by basketball player Magic Johnson. Chevy Chase and Beverly D'Angelo's characters from the National Lampoon's Vacation films appear driving by the Death Star. Chris, who is voiced by Seth Green, points out that Robot Chicken already did a Star Wars parody (Green is the creator of Robot Chicken).

== Reception ==
In its original broadcast on September 23, 2007, "Blue Harvest" was viewed by 10.86 million viewers. The episode acquired a 5.5 Nielsen rating, the audience measurement systems developed to determine the audience size and composition of television programming in the United States, in the 18–49 demographic.

Reviews of this episode were positive. Common Sense Media gave the episode three out of five stars, calling it a "racy but often hilarious satire of a fantasy favorite". Brad Trechak of TV Squad also praised "Blue Harvest", stating that it "was a fun episode to watch"; he thought that "MacFarlane kept to the story pretty well, and there were enough corny jokes to make it amusing". Ahsan Haque from IGN gave it a score of seven out of ten, criticizing the selection of Herbert as Obi-Wan, but did say that the other choices were "spot-on"; he ended his review by stating, "as a tribute to Star Wars, this episode succeeds, but you can't help but wish that there was a bit more to it, considering the nature of the source material". In a later review of the season as a whole, Haque said that the episode was "generally entertaining, but certainly wasn't as great as it could have been". In 2019, however, Jesse Schedeen, also from IGN, placed "Blue Harvest" as the second best episode in his list of the 20 best Family Guy episodes, to celebrate the show's 20th anniversary, stating that it "was Family Guy's first attempt at devoting an hour-length episode to lampooning the Star Wars franchise, and it remains the best." Daniel Fienberg of Zap2it also gave it a positive review although he stated that it was released soon after Robot Chicken's Star Wars special and it fared worse because of it. Tom Eames of entertainment website Digital Spy placed the episode at number three on his listing of the best Family Guy episodes in order of "yukyukyuks" and described the episode as "pretty much the same [as its sequel] but better."

Newsday's Diane Werts rendered a more mixed verdict, saying the episode "veer[s] wildly from bull's-eye satire to gotta-fill-time-now exposition", and was not as enjoyable for non-Star Wars fans. Robin Pierson of The TV Critic also gave it a mixed review, criticizing the writers for using the character of Herbert and the episode's musical moment which he called an "un-amusing waste of time", although he did praise the way that the episode satirized the Star Wars universe; he ended his review by saying that "Chances are the more you like Star Wars, the more you will enjoy this. For those of us who know Family Guy better than Star Wars, there is plenty of bad material here to remind us that nothing much has changed". He gave the episode 65 out of a possible 100.

The Parents Television Council, a group that has been a frequent critic of Family Guy, criticized the episode for a perceived frequent use of sexual dialogue, enough for the episode to have an "S" content descriptor for sexual content (the episode was rated TV-14-DLV on Fox).

In 2009, TV Guide ranked "Blue Harvest" #99 on its list of the 100 Greatest Episodes.

== Home media ==
The episode was released on January 15, 2008 for DVD, and on August 7, 2012 for Blu-ray in Region 1. It was issued on January 21, 2008 for DVD in Region 2, and on February 6, 2008 DVD and on August 24, 2011 for Blu-ray in Region 4. "Blue Harvest" was also released as part of the Laugh It Up, Fuzzball: The Family Guy Trilogy which was released on December 21, 2010 for DVD and on December 21, 2010 for Blu-ray in Region 1. It was issued on December 27, 2010 for both DVD and Blu-ray in Region 2. Its release date in Region 4 was December 22, 2010 for DVD and January 12, 2011 for Blu-ray.

== Sequels ==
"Blue Harvest" had two sequels, "Something, Something, Something, Dark Side", which parodied The Empire Strikes Back, and "It's a Trap!", which parodied Return of the Jedi, originally were released direct-to-video on December 22, 2009, and December 21, 2010, then later aired on Fox May 23, 2010 (season eight, episode 20) and May 22, 2011 (season nine, episode 18) respectively.
