= Star Wars Tech =

2007 documentary

Star Wars Tech is a 2007 forty-six-minute television documentary about the science and technology of Star Wars including droids (robots) and other major aspects. The documentary was included in the special features in the Blu-ray release of all the Star Wars saga films.

It is directed by Rick Hill, who is also partially the writer alongside Kevin Burns and Steven Smith. Dave Hoffman serves as narrator. NASA propulsion engineer Todd Barber is also a credited participant of the documentary. Also included in the documentary are commentaries from predominant scientists such as Lawrence Krauss and Jeanne Cavelos.
