= Ludosport =

Combat sport

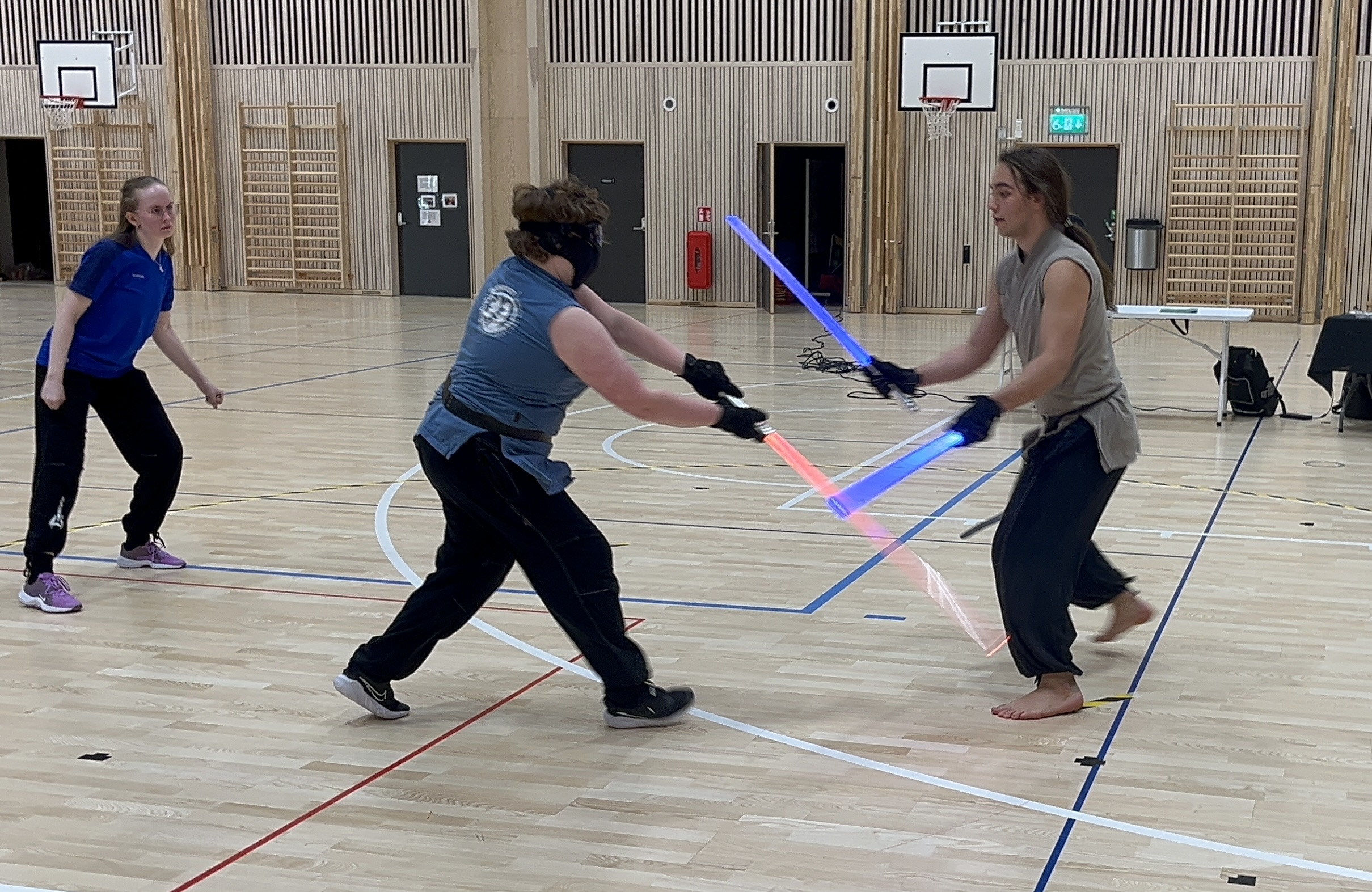
- Two competitors in a match, attempting to land hits on each other. One (light blue) using a long red-colored saber and the other (tan) using two short blue-colored sabers. An official (dark blue) watches for hits scored.
- First played: 2006
- Registered players: 5000
- Clubs: 80

Characteristics
- Contact: semi-contact
- Team members: singles
- Mixed-sex: yes
- Type: combat sport
- Equipment: polycarbonate sabers

LudoSport light saber combat (LudoSport Lightsaber Combat) is a combat sport created in 2006, in Milano, Italy. The sport is based on the premise of lightsaber combat. Practitioners of the sport can choose between seven forms and three weapons.

== Types ==
Short + Long + Saberstaff (Opposing Blade Hilt)

== Forms ==
7 forms.

Form 1, balanced & safe.

Form 2, darting & explosive.

Form 3, fluid & deceptive.

Form 4, acrobatic & unpredictable.

Form 5, quick & powerful.

Form 6, sophisticated & insidious.

Form 7, impetuous & dominating.

LudoSport is taught in a progressive fashion, with the different techniques and concepts broken into 7 distinct Forms of combat.

All 7 Forms have been designed to be balanced so that no single Form can be considered superior to the others, and also to allow the Forms to be blended and mixed by each athlete so that they can build a unique fighting style based on their own preferences and abilities.

All LudoSport practitioners, whether they be Instructors or Athletes, start by learning Form 1. Once this Form has been closed, which involves a practical Style Exam (similar to a grading in other sports with a progressive teaching model) that checks the practitioners understanding of the concepts and techniques of the Form, as well as the fundamental values of the sport and the overall ability to use the techniques in a safe and controlled fashion, the practitioner can move onto learning Form 2.

In a similar fashion, with regards to the Style Exam, when a practitioner closes Form 2, they can move onto learning Course Y, wherein they begin to learn a broader range of techniques and concepts in preparation for what are referred to as the "Advanced Forms." During Course Y, athletes are taught elements from Form 3, Form 4 and Form 5 using the long saber, and elements of Form 3 with both the staff and short sabers. From here, the athletes are able to choose which direction they would like to continue their learning in; Form 3, Form 4 or Form 5 with any of the weapons. This is an open pathway, however athletes are only able to learn the Forms and weapons that are available to them in their Academy, with regards to the qualifications held by the Instructors in said Academy.

== Ethic ==
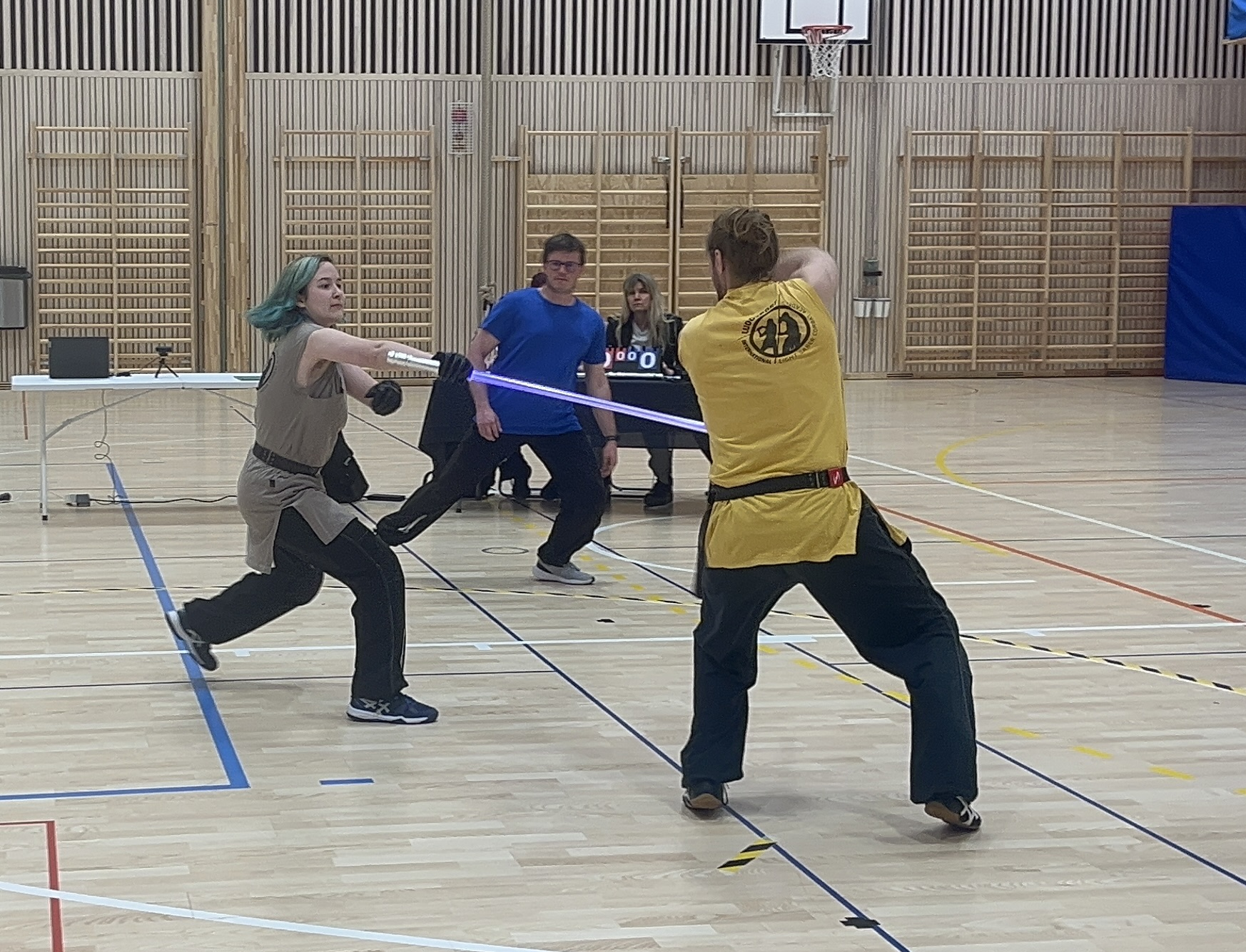
A match with mixed-sex competitors.

Ethics.

== Events ==
Events.

Every year (with exceptions for the COVID-19 pandemic years), 64 of the best athletes from around the world gather to compete in Champions Arena, the world championships.

Champions Arena
Year	Country	City
2017	Italy	Milan
2018	Italy	Milan
2019	Spain	Madrid
2022	Sweden	Stockholm
2023	France	Paris
2024	Italy	Milan
2025	United Kingdom	Manchester
2026	Italy	Milan
2027	Spain	Madrid
2028	Netherlands	Amsterdam

== History ==
Ludosport was born in Milan, Italy, between 2006 and 2007 thanks to the intuition and passion of three martial arts experts: Simone Spreafico, Gianluca Longo and Fabio monticelli.

The idea was not to create cinematic choreography or simple role-playing games, but rather to codify a new and serious fencing discipline based on the use of the lightsaber.

After an initial phase of experimentation and technical codification, the first sports association (LudoSport Combat Academy) was officially founded on September 15, 2007, laying the regulatory and technical foundations of the movement.

In the following years, academies opened in more cities around Italy and beyond. By winter 2026, the sport is available in several countries in Europe and North America, as well as Brazil, Reunion Island, and Japan.

Since LudoSport was born in Italy, its official language is Italian.

== Nations ==
80 LudoSport Academies

5000 LudoSport practitioners

300 Certified instructors

13 Nations:

Italy, Brazil, France, Sweden, Ireland, Spain, Netherlands, United Kingdom, United States, Germany, Canada, Japan, Czech Republic

== Recognition ==
While the sport is very new, it has gained recognition and is continuously featured in news articles and news reports. Although it has yet to become officially recognized as a real sport worldwide, the Swedish Budo and Martial Arts Association has recognized it, meaning the Swedish government officially recognizes it as a sport.

== Equipment ==
There are three weapons used within the sport.

The first weapon that is taught is called the "long saber" and is considered to be the 'typical' light saber style as popularised in various media. It consists of a hilt of between 258 and 322mm, weighing between 440 and 730 grams, with a protruding blade length of 865 to 875 mm. The long saber is used in the teaching/practicing of Forms 1 & 2 of LudoSport, and a portion of Course Y.

Once the practitioner has closed Forms 1 & 2, they can start to study Course Y, in which they are instructed in the initial use of the other two weapons in LudoSport; the staff (or saber staff) and the short sabers (or daggers).

The saberstaff is a double-bladed light saber, comprising a hilt of between 358 and 542 mm, weighing between 520 and 830 grams, with a protruding blade length of 725 to 735mm at each end of the hilt.

The short sabers are noticeably smaller, comprising a hilt of between 178 and 262 mm, weighing between 340 and 630 grams, with a protruding blade length of 595 to 605mm at each end of the hilt.

All blades used in LudoSport must be constructed entirely from polycarbonate, have a diameter of 25mm and a wall thickness of 2mm. All blades must have been produced by LamaDiLuce, or an associated partner, and can only be used if the date of production (stamped on the blade) is within 3 solar years of the date of the event.

== Rules ==
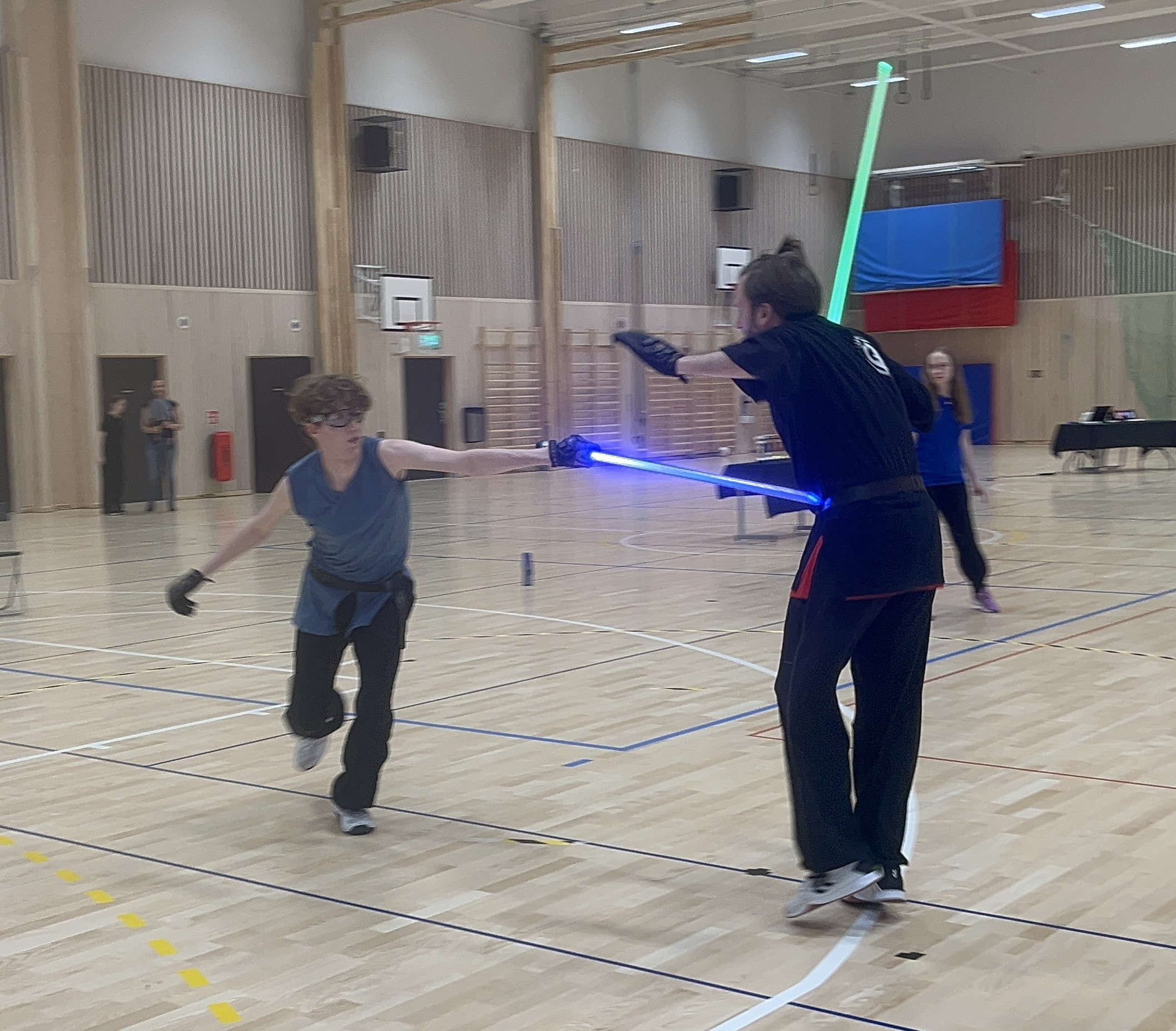
The competitor in blue scores an "OH" hit on the competitor in black.

Unlike fencing, where electronic equipment is used to indicate hits, LudoSport uses self-declaration to indicate hits. Meaning that the one hit must shout either IH or OH when hit. These are the two types of hits. IH hits are non lethal but forces the one hit to open up, or declare, giving the opponent an advantage and opportunity to advance on them unimpeded. OH hits on the other hand are lethal and gives a point to the other competitor. It is possible that an "Auto-OH" happens, wherein a competitor scores an OH on themselves, which in turn gives a point to their opponent.

An IH must be declared if the competitor receives a strike from an active blade, belonging either to their opponent or themselves, on the hilt, hands, lower arm (below the elbow) or lower leg (below the knee). The declaration for this must remove the blades from the centre of combat, so that it/they are not impeding the opponent to advance. This removal, or opening, must provide at least one tempo (or time in which an action can be performed) to the opponent. Furthermore, the blade cannot be charged, or the momentum used to quickly bring it back into the centre of combat; essentially the struck competitor must move their blade away from the centre of combat and keep their blade out of this centre for one tempo. The struck competitor is allowed to move in direction during this period.

An OH must be declared if any other part of the body is contacted with the blade, including the top of the head, the torso, upper arms (including the elbow), and upper legs (including the knee). The face is not a valid target in LudoSport, in the interest of safety.

Although the sport relies on self declaration, there are also always officials/referees who watch the match and will call stop if any intervention is required, or a point has been conceded. Officials can also make other calls, such as "continuare" (continue in Italian) if the strikes received are not valid, or to signal the fight should generally continue.

Each match comprises a number so called assalti (rounds). Depending on the type of event, and the stage of the event in which the assalti is taking place, a different number of points will be required to win the assalti. Usually, in the Pools phase of a tournament, the match comprises three assalti, however as the event progresses to the Eliminations phase, this is increased to four.

An assalti can have three outcomes: if one of the duelists gets an OH hit on the opponent they will receive the point. However, if both duelists hit each other at the same time it will result in a doppio, (meaning double in Italian). A doppio gives no points but still uses up the assalti in the Pools phase. The third outcome is nullo, this only happens when the judges cannot determine what happened and who should’ve gotten the point. If nullo happens the assalti will be replayed. In the Pools phase, it is possible for either competitor to win by scoring more points, or it is possible that there is a "pareggio" (meaning tie/draw in Italian), however this is not possible in any Elimination phase due to the requirement for their to be a winner of that round.

== See also ==
- Star Wars
- Star Wars: Light of the Jedi
