= Laugh It Up, Fuzzball: The Family Guy Trilogy =

2010 film by Peter Shin, Dominic Polcino

- Blu-ray cover, featuring Stewie as Darth Vader
- Directed by: Dominic Polcino; Peter Shin
- Written by: Alec Sulkin (1); Kirker Butler (2); Cherry Chevapravatdumrong; David A. Goodman (3)
- Based on: Star Wars by George Lucas
- Produced by: Seth MacFarlane; Alex Borstein; Mike Henry; Chris Sheridan; David A. Goodman
- Starring: Seth MacFarlane; Alex Borstein; Seth Green; Mila Kunis; Mike Henry
- Edited by: Lucasfilm
- Music by: John Williams; Additional music; Walter Murphy
- Production companies: Fuzzy Door Productions; Fox Television Animation; Lucasfilm
- Distributed by: 20th Century Fox Television
- Release date: December 21, 2010
- Running time: 159 minutes
- Country: United States
- Language: English

Laugh It Up, Fuzzball: The Family Guy Trilogy consists of three episodes of the American animated sitcom Family Guy. The episodes are a crossover and parody retelling of the Star Wars original trilogy, consisting of the films Star Wars (Note: Retroactively subtitled A New Hope) (1977), The Empire Strikes Back (1980), and Return of the Jedi (1983). The first episode, "Blue Harvest" (2007), was released to commemorate the original film's 30th anniversary. Due to its success, it was followed by two direct-to-video sequels: "Something, Something, Something, Dark Side" (2009) and "It's a Trap!" (2010), which were subsequently aired on television in edited versions, omitting most profanity and sexual references. The trilogy was released on Blu-ray and DVD in the United States on December 21, 2010. Its title comes from a phrase Han Solo said to Chewbacca in The Empire Strikes Back as the latter was laughing at the former.

== Plot ==
During power outages, Peter Griffin tells his family the stories of the original Star Wars trilogy films, with characters from Family Guy, The Cleveland Show, and American Dad! playing the Star Wars roles.

== Cast ==
Seth MacFarlane

- Peter Griffin as Han Solo
- Brian Griffin as Chewbacca
- Stewie Griffin as Darth Vader
- Glenn Quagmire as C-3PO
- Carter Pewterschmidt as Owen Lars / Emperor Palpatine
- Roger as Moff Jerjerrod
- Tim the Bear as Wicket
- Tom Tucker as Death Star News Anchorman

Alex Borstein

- Lois Griffin as Princess Leia
- Barbara Pewterschmidt as Beru Lars

Seth Green

- Chris Griffin as Luke Skywalker

Mila Kunis

- Meg Griffin as the Dianoga / the Exogorth / the Sarlacc

Mike Henry

- Cleveland Brown as R2-D2
- Herbert as Obi-Wan Kenobi
- Bruce as Greedo / Captain Piett
- Rallo Tubbs as Nien Nunb
- Consuela as Darth Vader's maid (herself) / Jabba's doorguard

Adam West

- Adam West as Grand Moff Tarkin

Patrick Warburton

- Joe Swanson as Biggs Darklighter / the probe droid / Jabba the Hutt

Johnny Brennan

- Mort Goldman as a Jawa / Lando Calrissian

H. Jon Benjamin

- Carl as Yoda

Danny Smith

- Ernie the Giant Chicken as Boba Fett

Dee Bradley Baker

- Klaus Heissler as Admiral Ackbar

Carrie Fisher

- Angela as Mon Mothma

Blue Harvest

- Chevy Chase as Clark Griswold
- Beverly D'Angelo as Ellen Griswold
- Rush Limbaugh as Himself / Red 6
- Helen Reddy as Herself
- Mick Hucknall as Himself
- Alex Thomas as Himself
- Judd Nelson as John Bender

Something, Something, Something, Dark Side

- James Woods as Himself / General Veers
- John Bunnell as Himself
- Elizabeth Banks as Herself
- Dolph Lundgren as Captain Ivan Drago (live-action footage from Rocky IV)
- Brigitte Nielsen as Ludmilla Vobet Drago (live-action footage from Rocky IV)
- Michael Pataki as Nicoli Koloff (live-action footage from Rocky IV)
- Tom Selleck as Himself (live-action footage from Her Alibi)
- James Caan as Himself
- Joe Flaherty as Western Union worker from Back to the Future Part II

It's a Trap!

- Rush Limbaugh as the Rancor
- Ted Knight as Judge Smails (live-action footage from Caddyshack)
- Anne Hathaway as Hot Blonde
- Bruce McGill as John Williams
- Mary Hart as Herself
- Conway Twitty as Himself (archive footage)
- Patrick Stewart as Captain Jean-Luc Picard
- Michael Dorn as Lieutenant Worf

== Production ==
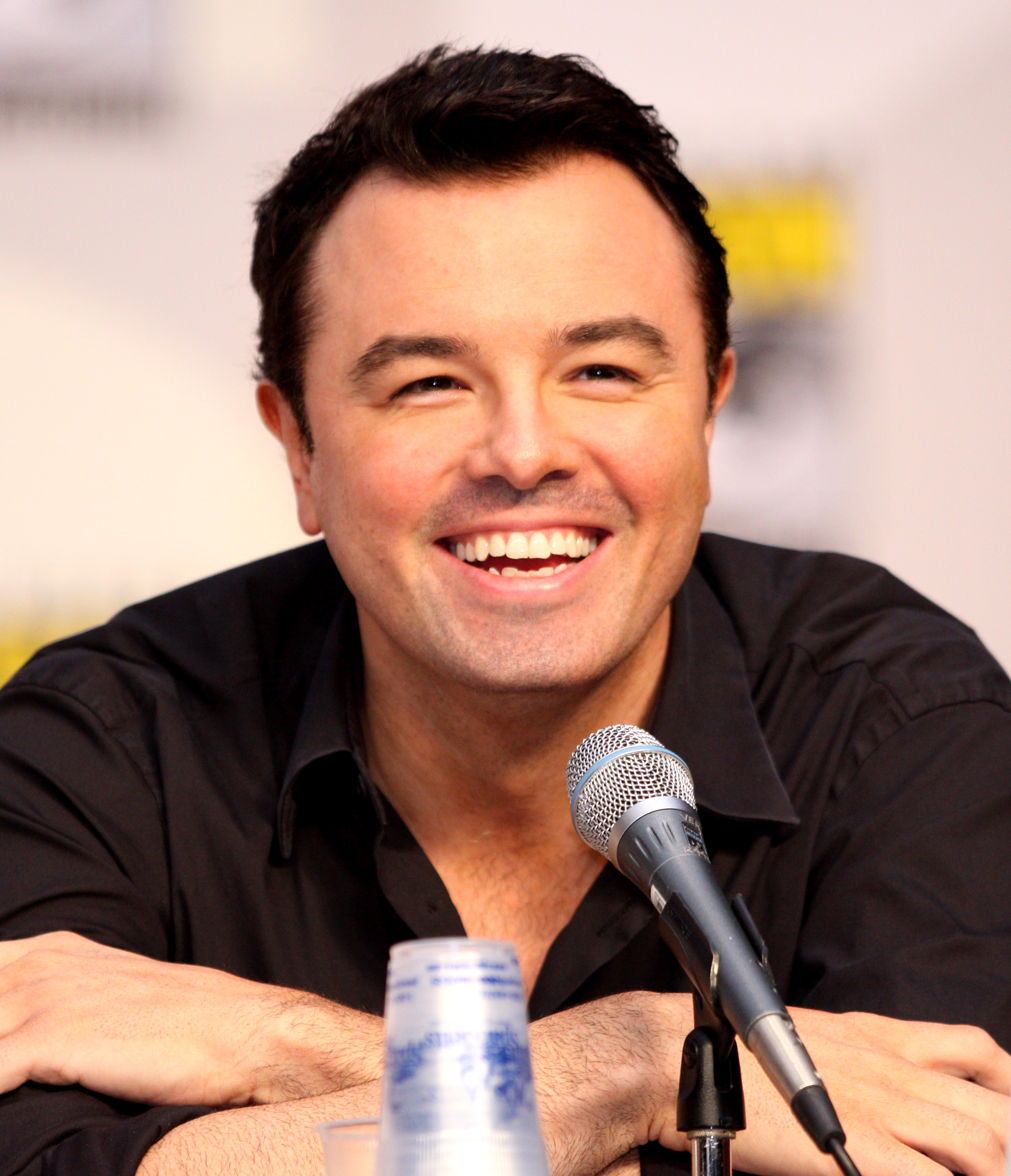
Family Guy creator Seth MacFarlane served as executive producer for the trilogy.

=== "Blue Harvest" ===
At the 2007 Comic Con, a series of clips were shown at a panel for Family Guy from the season premiere episode, showing the Family Guy characters as Star Wars characters. The episode aired on September 23, 2007, with some slight changes from the clips shown at Comic Con. Parts of this episode were shown at Star Wars Celebration IV, at which Family Guy creator Seth MacFarlane, a Star Wars fan since childhood, was a special guest, and again at San Diego Comic-Con in 2007. The episode was officially endorsed by Lucasfilm, especially George Lucas, who revealed in his conversation with MacFarlane that he has TiVoed every episode of Family Guy without having to buy the DVDs and, in addition to Jackass, it is the only show he watches. MacFarlane said they were extremely helpful when the Family Guy crew wanted to parody their works.

=== "Something, Something, Something, Dark Side" ===
The episode was written by series regular Kirker Butler, before the 2007–2008 Writers Guild of America strike, and before his leave from the series in order to become co-executive producer of the Family Guy spinoff series The Cleveland Show. Butler wrote the first draft of the episode in four weeks, under the guidance of series creator Seth MacFarlane. The episode was directed by Dominic Polcino, who had previously directed "Blue Harvest". This was the last episode in the series to use hand-drawn animatics, before transitioning to computer-designed animatics.

=== "It's a Trap!" ===
It was announced in March 2009 that the cast of the show had read through an early draft of the script under the working title "Episode VI: The Great Muppet Caper". The second working title, "We Have a Bad Feeling About This", was a reference to the recurring catchphrase used in the Star Wars films. The settled-upon title is a reference to the line by Admiral Ackbar in the film.

== Future spoofs ==
When asked about the possibility of a Family Guy retelling of the other Star Wars trilogies, Alec Sulkin stated that a spoof of the Star Wars prequel and sequel trilogies were unlikely to happen due to the difficulty and struggle of spoofing The Empire Strikes Back and the 2012 Disney acquisition of Lucasfilm being the primary reasons. Sulkin stated, "We like the first three but by the time we were done with the third one I think we were about ready to kill ourselves. The new regime at Star Wars / Disney is a little more difficult to deal with. Before we were just dealing with Lucasfilm and Seth had a good relationship with them... I just think that [Disney's] a little more rigid". Series creator Seth MacFarlane also commented on the situation via Twitter stating "Disney keeps a tighter hold on it, so it's unlikely", though this could change following the buyout of 21st Century Fox's entertainment assets by Disney.

A spoof of the Indiana Jones series was also considered for development, but has not received any updates concerning its production.
