= It's a Trap! =

- Family Guy episode
- DVD cover
- Episode no.: Season 9 Episode 18
- Directed by: Peter Shin
- Written by: Cherry Chevapravatdumrong; David A. Goodman
- Editing by: Mike Elias
- Production code: 7ACX21/7ACX22
- Original air date: May 22, 2011 (Note: This episode was first released in It's a Trap! and Laugh It Up, Fuzzball: The Family Guy Trilogy DVD on December 21, 2010.)

Guest appearances
- H. Jon Benjamin as Carl/Yoda; Dee Bradley Baker as Klaus Heissler/Admiral Ackbar; Patrick Stewart as Captain Jean-Luc Picard; Michael Dorn as Lieutenant Worf; Carrie Fisher as Angela/Mon Mothma; Rush Limbaugh as himself/Rancor; Anne Hathaway as hot blonde; Bruce McGill as John Williams; Mary Hart as herself

Episode chronology
← Previous "Foreign Affairs"	Next → "Lottery Fever"
- Family Guy season 9

"It's a Trap!" is a direct-to-video special of the animated series Family Guy, which later served as the two-part season finale of the show's ninth season, and is the third and final part of the series' Star Wars parody trilogy Laugh It Up, Fuzzball. It is named after the phrase uttered by Admiral Ackbar in the Star Wars film Return of the Jedi. The home video was first released on December 21, 2010, and the episode later aired on Fox in the United States on May 22, 2011.

The episode was written by Cherry Chevapravatdumrong and David A. Goodman and directed by Peter Shin. It retells the story of Return of the Jedi as "Blue Harvest" did with Star Wars and "Something, Something, Something, Dark Side" did with The Empire Strikes Back by recasting characters from Family Guy into roles from the film.

== Plot ==
The Griffin family experience another power outage, forcing them to reluctantly go through Return of the Jedi. Rather than setting up the plot, the opening crawl states that the Fox Broadcasting Company required Seth MacFarlane to complete the trilogy to be allowed to direct Ted.

On Tatooine, R2-D2 and C-3PO find Jabba the Hutt's palace in order to initiate a plan to save Han Solo, still frozen in carbonite for posterity. Leia unfreezes Han but Jabba captures her and she is shackled by Jabba's side. Han, meanwhile, is thrown into a prison cell with Chewbacca. Luke arrives at the palace and attempts to bargain for the release of his friends. Jabba opens a trap door and Luke falls into a pit where he battles and kills the Rancor. Afterwards, Jabba orders Luke and his friends to be eaten by the Sarlacc. Luke initiates an assault on Jabba's crew with the help of Lando Calrissian. Leia chokes Jabba using her slave chains while the others commandeer a transport ship.

Luke and R2-D2 fly to Dagobah so Luke can finish his training with Yoda while the others rejoin the rebel fleet. On Dagobah, Yoda explains the final part of training is to face Vader. In his dying words, Yoda reveals that Luke has a sibling. The spirit of Obi-Wan Kenobi explains that his sibling is Princess Leia.

Admiral Ackbar explains that to destroy the Death Star they must first disable a shield generator on the forest moon of Endor. Han uses a stolen Imperial ship and old access code to sneak past the Empire's blockade. Vader allows them passage, knowing Luke is aboard. When they reach the moon's surface, the rebels are spotted by Imperial soldiers which they stop from reporting after a high-speed chase. Separated from the others, Leia is befriended by Wicket the Ewok. Luke, Han, Chewie and the droids fall into an Ewok trap while searching for Leia. They are captured and brought to the village where Leia is being housed. The Ewoks believe C-3PO is a god and begin to worship him. Luke tells Princess Leia they are siblings, but Leia claims to have already known that.

Following Yoda's advice, Luke surrenders to Vader in order to confront him. Vader tries to convince Luke to turn to the dark side. Luke refuses and the two meet with the Emperor, who reveals that Luke's friends are walking into a trap on the forest moon. When this revelation fails to anger Luke, the Emperor begins to mock actor Seth Green (who voices Chris). Luke defends Green, saying that he's been in successful projects, only to have the Emperor note the negative side of Green's roles. Luke becomes enraged and begins dueling with Vader.

Back on the forest moon, Han leads the rebels to the shield generator, however, the company is ambushed. The Ewoks help the rebels escape from the Imperial troops and destroy the shield generator, while Lando and Nien Nunb lead the attack on the Death Star.

Luke finally subdues Vader, but he refuses to execute him and join the dark side at the Emperor's request. The Emperor then incapacitates Luke with his powerful Force lightning. Because Luke asks Vader politely for help, Vader gathers his remaining strength and kills the distracted Emperor by throwing him into the reactor core. Vader and Luke manage to flee the Death Star before Lando and his crew blow it up. Unfortunately, when Vader asks Luke to help him remove his mask (to "look on you with my own eyes"), Luke accidentally twists and breaks Vader's neck. Everyone rendezvous back at the Ewok village to celebrate the rebels' victory over the Empire. While the Ewoks kill the wounded Imperials, the spirits of Obi-Wan and Yoda appear to Luke, alongside the spirit of the redeemed Anakin Skywalker, who angrily accuses Luke of murdering him and starts swearing at him.

The Griffins' power returns just as Peter concludes the story, Meg then asks Peter "What about the prequel trilogy?" with Peter suggesting that The Cleveland Show might do the prequels. After that, the family starts arguing about whether Seth Green or Seth MacFarlane is a better artist.

== Cast ==
- Chris Griffin as Luke Skywalker
- Peter Griffin as Han Solo
- Lois Griffin as Princess Leia
- Mort Goldman as Lando Calrissian
- Glenn Quagmire as C-3PO
- Cleveland Brown as R2-D2
- Brian Griffin as Chewbacca
- Klaus Heissler as Admiral Ackbar (crossover from American Dad!)
- Carter Pewterschmidt as Emperor Palpatine
- Herbert as Obi-Wan Kenobi
- Carl as Yoda
- Stewie Griffin as Darth Vader/Anakin Skywalker
- Joe Swanson as Jabba the Hutt
- Ernie the Giant Chicken as Boba Fett
- Rallo Tubbs as Nien Nunb (crossover from The Cleveland Show)
- Meg Griffin as the Sarlacc
- Roger as Moff Jerjerrod (crossover from American Dad!)
- Tim the Bear as Wicket (crossover from The Cleveland Show)
- Angela as Mon Mothma
- Consuela as the sentry droid
- Opie as the frog like creature that eats the sentry droid
- Patrick Stewart as Jean-Luc Picard
- Michael Dorn as Worf
- Rush Limbaugh as Rancor
- Conway Twitty (archive footage) as Darth Twitty
- Ted Knight (archive footage from Caddyshack) as Judge Smails
- Anne Hathaway as Hot Blonde
- Barbara Pewterschmidt as Carol Palpatine (deleted cameo)
- Donna Tubbs as Queen Sheryl (deleted cameo)
- Cleveland Brown Jr. as Jack (deleted cameo)
- Roberta Tubbs as Sally (deleted cameo)
- Michael Jai White as Black Dynamite (deleted cameo)

== Background ==
It was announced in March 2009 the show had read through an early draft of the script under the working title, Episode VI: The Great Muppet Caper. The second working title, We Have a Bad Feeling About This, was a reference to the recurring catchphrase that is used in the Star Wars films. The settled-upon title is a reference to the line by Admiral Ackbar in the film, which became an Internet meme through YTMND.

In terms of production, this was the first episode produced in 16:9 and high definition (the first episode to air in 16.9 and high definition was instead the season 9 premiere "And Then There Were Fewer").

Due to the declining number of unused Family Guy characters, the episode also features characters from American Dad! and The Cleveland Show: Roger appears as Moff Jerjerrod, (with Vader/Stewie commenting "Are we already out of our own characters?") Klaus appears as Admiral Ackbar, Tim appears as Wicket the Ewok and Rallo appears as Nien Nunb. Stan was originally going to appear as Wedge Antilles, but his part got cut (he is still mentioned when Lando orders him to destroy the Power Station in the main reactor of the Death Star).

The role of Meg Griffin continues to be minor, this time taking the role of the Sarlacc.

The episode featured voice cameos from Patrick Stewart and Michael Dorn reprising their roles of Captain Jean-Luc Picard and Lieutenant Worf from Star Trek: The Next Generation, Adam West, Carrie Fisher and Rush Limbaugh as the Rancor (Limbaugh had previously made a cameo as himself in "Blue Harvest"). At the Sarlacc Pit, when the Rebels keep nodding at each other to fight back against Jabba's minions, an image of an impatient Ted Knight appears from a clip of Caddyshack ("Well, we're waiting!").

== Production ==
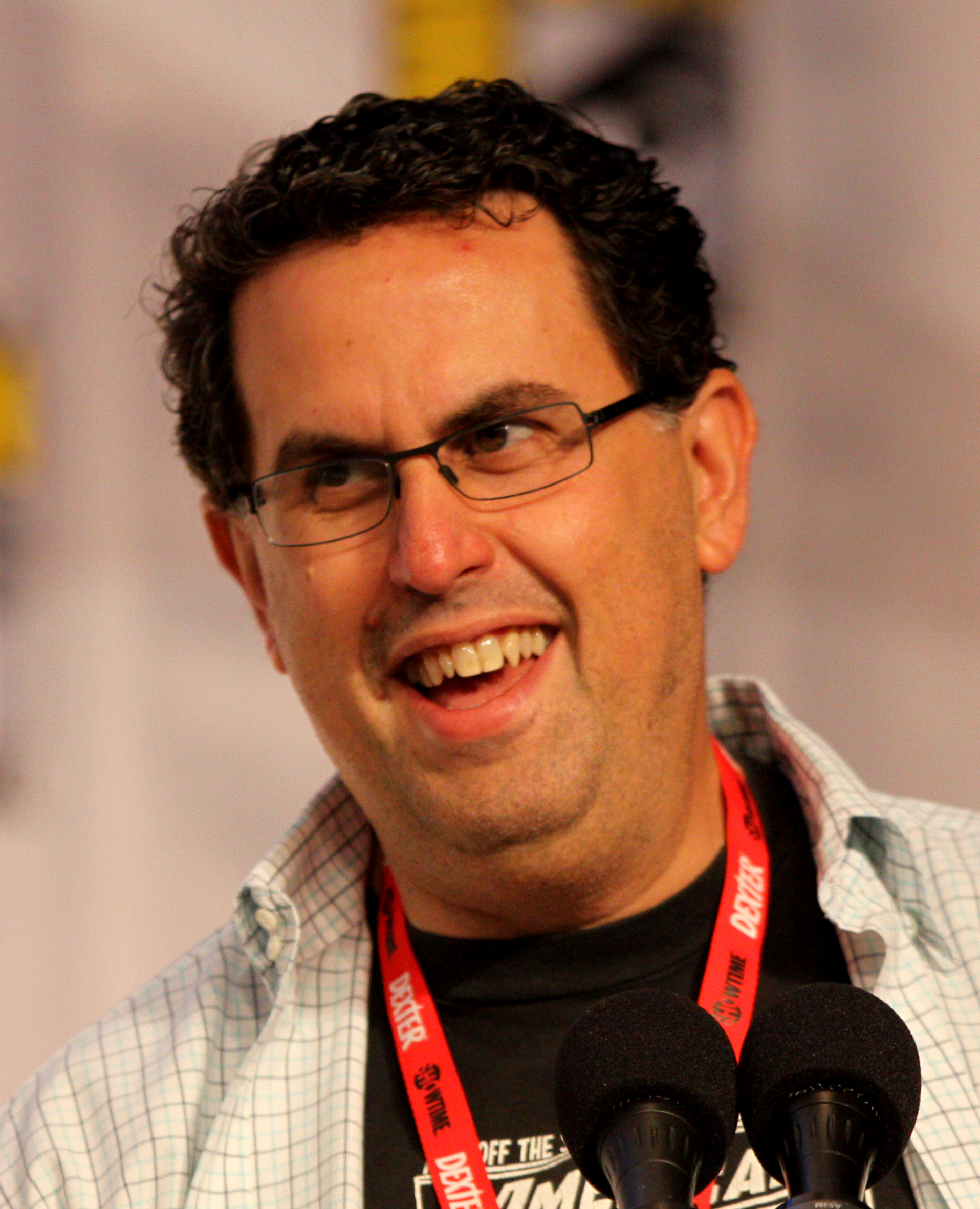
David A. Goodman co-wrote the episode, along with Cherry Chevapravatdumrong.

The episode was written by Cherry Chevapravatdumrong and David A. Goodman and directed by Peter Shin, in his first episode since the fourth season. A preview of the reading of the episode can be seen on the "Something, Something, Something, Dark Side" DVD extras.

== Reception ==
On Rotten Tomatoes, it holds an approval rating of 60% based on 5 reviews, with an average rating of 6.7/10.

== Home media ==
Both the Blu-ray and DVD versions, titled Family Guy Presents: It's a Trap!, were released on region A and region 1, respectively, on December 21, 2010, Region 4, on December 22, 2010, and in Region 2 on December 27, 2010. It was broadcast on the Fox network May 22, 2011 as the 9th-season finale. It was also released in the trilogy collection, Laugh It Up, Fuzzball.
