= List of Family Guy guest stars =

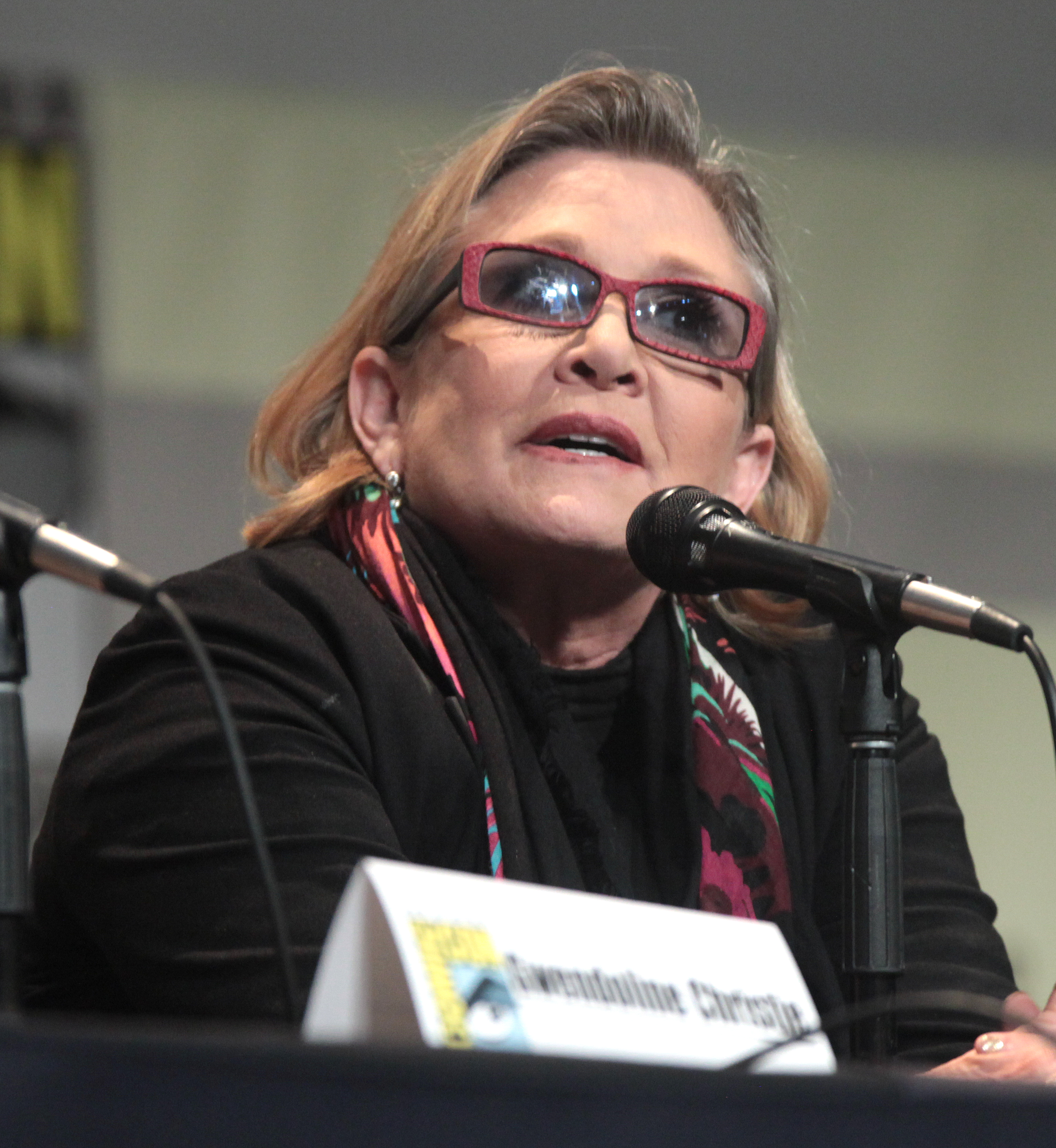
Actress Carrie Fisher, known for her role as Princess Leia in the original Star Wars trilogy, made 25 guest appearances on Family Guy as Peter's boss, Angela.

Family Guy is an American adult animated sitcom created by Seth MacFarlane for the Fox Broadcasting Company. The series centers on the Griffins, a family consisting of parents Peter and Lois; their children Meg, Chris, and Stewie; and their anthropomorphic pet dog Brian. The show is set in the fictional city of Quahog, Rhode Island, and exhibits much of its humor in the form of cutaway gags that often lampoon American culture. Along with its core voice actors, episodes make frequent use of guest stars.

Guest stars who have lent their voices to the show come from a wide range of occupations including musicians, actors, athletes, politicians, scientists and more. Some have only made a single appearance, while others like James Woods and Ryan Reynolds have gone on to become recurring fan favorites. Over the years, the show has become notable for featuring actors reprising their roles in animated form. In the episode "Lois Comes Out of Her Shell", for example, Johnny Depp reprised his iconic role as Edward Scissorhands. Most early guest stars appeared less as characters and more as themselves, with musician Waylon Jennings being the first to do so in the episode "Chitty Chitty Death Bang". Furthermore, in "Not All Dogs Go to Heaven", the entire main cast of Star Trek: The Next Generation–including Patrick Stewart, Jonathan Frakes, Brent Spiner, LeVar Burton, Gates McFadden, Michael Dorn, Wil Wheaton, Marina Sirtis, and even Denise Crosby (season 1 as Tasha Yar)–appear as themselves headed to a Star Trek convention.

== Season 1 ==
Name	Role(s)	Episode
Erik Estrada^{†}	Ponch	"I Never Met the Dead Man"; Episode 2
Frank Welker	Fred Jones	"I Never Met the Dead Man"; Episode 2
John O'Hurley	Cult leader	"Chitty Chitty Death Bang"; Episode 3
Waylon Jennings	Himself	"Chitty Chitty Death Bang"; Episode 3
Alex Rocco	Soccer parent	"Mind Over Murder"; Episode 4
Leslie Uggams	Herself	"Mind Over Murder"; Episode 4
Michelle Kwan	Herself	"A Hero Sits Next Door"; Episode 5
Bobby Slayton	Leonard Cornfeathers	"The Son Also Draws"; Episode 6
Mary Scheer	Ann Landers; Mary; Mother	"Brian: Portrait of a Dog"; Episode 7
Dick Van Patten	Tom Bradford	"Brian: Portrait of a Dog"; Episode 7

^{†}Uncredited

== Season 2 ==
Name	Role(s)	Episode
Fairuza Balk	Connie D'Amico	"Peter, Peter, Caviar Eater"; Episode 1
Gregory Jbara	Jonathan	"Peter, Peter, Caviar Eater"; Episode 1
Robin Leach	Himself	"Peter, Peter, Caviar Eater"; Episode 1
Charles Durning	Francis Griffin	"Holy Crap"; Episode 2
Olivia Hack	Cindy Brady	"Holy Crap"; Episode 2
Dwight Schultz	The Pope	"Holy Crap"; Episode 2
Florence Stanley	Thelma Griffin	"Holy Crap"; Episode 2
Patrick Duffy^{*}	Bobby Ewing	"Da Boom"; Episode 3
Jack Perkins^{JP}	Himself	"Da Boom"; Episode 3
Victoria Principal^{*}	Pamela Ewing	"Da Boom"; Episode 3
Will Sasso	Randy Newman	"Da Boom"; Episode 3
Sam Waterston	Dr. Kaplan	"Brian in Love"; Episode 4
Debra Wilson	Mrs. Kraner; Sandy Belford	"Love Thy Trophy"; Episode 5
Karen Black	Herself	"Death Is a Bitch"; Episode 6
Norm Macdonald^{†}	Death	"Death Is a Bitch"; Episode 6
Candice Bergen	Gloria Ironbachs	"I Am Peter, Hear Me Roar"; Episode 8
Faith Ford	Sarah Bennett, Corky Sherwood	"I Am Peter, Hear Me Roar"; Episode 8
Martin Mull	Mr. Harris	"If I'm Dyin', I'm Lyin'"; Episode 9
James Carville^{†}	Himself	"Running Mates"; Episode 10
Lee Majors	Himself	"Running Mates"; Episode 10
Dwight Schultz	Randall Fargus	"Running Mates"; Episode 10
Jack Sheldon^{†}	'Vagina Junction' conductor	"Running Mates"; Episode 10
Candice Bergen	Murphy Brown	"A Picture is Worth 1,000 Bucks"; Episode 11
Charles Kimbrough	Jim Dial	"A Picture is Worth 1,000 Bucks"; Episode 11
Joe Regalbuto	Frank Fontana; Bull; Editor	"A Picture is Worth 1,000 Bucks"; Episode 11
Brian Doyle-Murray	Luke	"Road to Rhode Island"; Episode 13
Victoria Principal	Dr. Amanda Rebecca	"Road to Rhode Island"; Episode 13
Gregg Allman^{GA}	Himself	"Let's Go to the Hop"; Episode 14
Mo Collins	Daycare teacher Stewardess	"Dammit Janet!"; Episode 15
Haley Joel Osment	Leonard; Daycare kid	"Dammit Janet!"; Episode 15
Camryn Manheim	Brad	"Dammit Janet!"; Episode 15
Michael Chiklis	Big Fat Paulie	"There's Something About Paulie"; Episode 16
Robert Costanzo	Biff; Louie	"There's Something About Paulie"; Episode 16
Jon Cryer	Kevin	"There's Something About Paulie"; Episode 16
Alan King	The Don	"There's Something About Paulie"; Episode 16
Jay Mohr	Logan	"He's Too Sexy for His Fat"; Episode 17
Shawn Pyfrom	Oliver	"E. Peterbus Unum"; Episode 18
Luke Perry	Himself	"The Story on Page One"; Episode 19
Adam Carolla	Death	"Wasted Talent"; Episode 20
Michael McKean	Pawtucket Pat	"Wasted Talent"; Episode 20
Julia Sweeney	Woman in bar	"Wasted Talent"; Episode 20

^{*}Live-action role ^{†}Uncredited
^{JP}This would be Jack Perkins' final film/television series role.
^{GA}This would be Gregg Allman's final film/television series role.

== Season 3 ==
Name	Role(s)	Episode
June Foray	Rocket J. Squirrel	"The Thin White Line"; Episode 1
Leif Garrett	Himself	"The Thin White Line"; Episode 1
Haley Joel Osment	Kid in bathroom	"The Thin White Line"; Episode 1
Louise DuArt	Joan Rivers	"Brian Does Hollywood"; Episode 2
Olivia Hack	Melissa Rivers	"Brian Does Hollywood"; Episode 2
Jenna Jameson	Herself	"Brian Does Hollywood"; Episode 2
Ron Jeremy	Himself	"Brian Does Hollywood"; Episode 2
Ray Liotta	Zack	"Brian Does Hollywood"; Episode 2
Ricky Blitt^{*}	Alyssa Milano's lawyer	"Mr. Griffin Goes to Washington"; Episode 3
Alyssa Milano^{*}	Herself	"Mr. Griffin Goes to Washington"; Episode 3
Jack Sheldon	The Bill	"Mr. Griffin Goes to Washington"; Episode 3
Ed Asner	Brown-Haired Prisoner	"One If By Clam, Two If By Sea"; Episode 4
Hugh Laurie	Bar patron	"One If By Clam, Two If By Sea"; Episode 4
Patrick Duffy	Jack; Salesman; Teacher	"And the Wiener Is..."; Episode 5
Adam Carolla	Death	"Death Lives"; Episode 6
Estelle Harris	Death's mother	"Death Lives"; Episode 6
Peter Frampton	Himself	"Death Lives"; Episode 6
Laura Silverman	Amy	"Death Lives"; Episode 6
Michael Chiklis	Bronx guy #1	"Lethal Weapons"; Episode 7
Peter Gallagher	Jared	"Lethal Weapons"; Episode 7
Hugh Downs	Himself	"The Kiss Seen Around the World"; Episode 8
Josh Peck^{†}	Charlie	"The Kiss Seen Around the World"; Episode 8
Abe Vigoda	Himself	"The Kiss Seen Around the World"; Episode 8
Adam Carolla	Death	"Mr. Saturday Knight"; Episode 9
R. Lee Ermey	Coach	"Mr. Saturday Knight"; Episode 9
Will Ferrell	The Black Knight	"Mr. Saturday Knight"; Episode 9
Jimmy Kimmel	Death's dog Man in suit Renaissance guy	"Mr. Saturday Knight"; Episode 9
Michael Chiklis	Hennessey	"A Fish Out of Water"; Episode 10
Brian Doyle-Murray	Salty	"A Fish Out of Water"; Episode 10
Majel Barrett	Ship computer	"Emission Impossible"; Episode 11
Carol Kane	Carol	"Emission Impossible"; Episode 11
Wallace Shawn	Bertram	"Emission Impossible"; Episode 11
Dakota Fanning	Little girl	"To Love and Die in Dixie"; Episode 12
Waylon Jennings^{W}	Himself	"To Love and Die in Dixie"; Episode 12
Kathleen Wilhoite	Sam	"To Love and Die in Dixie"; Episode 12
Bob Barker	Himself	"Screwed the Pooch"; Episode 13
Don LaFontaine	FOX Announcer	"Screwed the Pooch"; Episode 13
Meredith Scott Lynn	Brenda	"Peter Griffin: Husband, Father...Brother?"; Episode 14
Valerie Bertinelli	Herself as Bonnie Swanson	"Ready, Willing, and Disabled"; Episode 15
Tony Danza	Himself as Joe Swanson	"Ready, Willing, and Disabled"; Episode 15
Alex Rocco	Bea Arthur as Peter Griffin	"Ready, Willing, and Disabled"; Episode 15
KISS: Peter Criss; Ace Frehley; Gene Simmons; Paul Stanley	Themselves	"A Very Special Family Guy Freakin' Christmas"; Episode 16
Fred Willard	Dave Campbell	"From Method to Madness"; Episode 18
Jennifer Love Hewitt	Herself	"Stuck Together, Torn Apart"; Episode 19
Andy Dick	Himself	"Road to Europe"; Episode 20
Jon Favreau	Donny Sciberra; First bazaar salesman	"Road to Europe"; Episode 20
Lauren Graham	Mother Maggie	"Road to Europe"; Episode 20
KISS	Themselves	"Road to Europe"; Episode 20
Jane Lynch	Dotty Campbell	"Road to Europe"; Episode 20
Michael McKean	Pengrove Pig; Andy Rooney; Camel salesman	"Road to Europe"; Episode 20
Fred Willard	Dave Campbell	"Road to Europe"; Episode 20
Adam Carolla	Death	"Family Guy Viewer Mail 1"; Episode 21
Bill Goldberg	Brawny guy on bus	"Family Guy Viewer Mail 1"; Episode 21
Regis Philbin	Himself	"Family Guy Viewer Mail 1"; Episode 21
Kelly Ripa	Herself	"Family Guy Viewer Mail 1"; Episode 21
Michael Winslow	Himself	"Family Guy Viewer Mail 1"; Episode 21
Ricky Blitt	Mordecai	"When You Wish Upon a Weinstein"; Episode 22
Ed McMahon	Himself	"When You Wish Upon a Weinstein"; Episode 22
Mark Hamill	Luke Skywalker; Obi-Wan Kenobi	"When You Wish Upon a Weinstein"; Episode 22
Peter Riegert	Max Weinstein	"When You Wish Upon a Weinstein"; Episode 22
Ben Stein	Rabbi Goldberg	"When You Wish Upon a Weinstein"; Episode 22

^{*}Live-action role ^{†}Uncredited
^{W}This would be Waylon Jennings' final television series role.

== Season 4 ==
Name	Role(s)	Episode
Hunter Gomez	Pinocchio	"North by North Quahog"; Episode 1
Don LaFontaine	Himself	"North by North Quahog"; Episode 1
André Sogliuzzo	Mel Gibson; Chris Tucker; Hotel manager	"North by North Quahog"; Episode 1
Drew Barrymore	Mrs. Lockhart	"Fast Times at Buddy Cianci, Jr. High"; Episode 2
Arif S. Kinchen	Carlos	"Fast Times at Buddy Cianci, Jr. High"; Episode 2
Hugh Laurie	TV presenter	"Fast Times at Buddy Cianci, Jr. High"; Episode 2
Steven Zirnkilton	Himself	"Fast Times at Buddy Cianci, Jr. High"; Episode 2
Gina Gershon	Policewoman	"Blind Ambition"; Episode 3
Judd Hirsch	Himself	"Blind Ambition"; Episode 3
Jimmy Iovine	Himself	"Don't Make Me Over"; Episode 4
Gene Simmons	Himself; Prisoner #3	"Don't Make Me Over"; Episode 4
Jane Carr	Endora	"The Cleveland-Loretta Quagmire"; Episode 5
Mariam Flynn	Samantha	"The Cleveland-Loretta Quagmire"; Episode 5
Fred Tatasciore	Randy Savage	"The Cleveland-Loretta Quagmire"; Episode 5
LeVar Burton	Vern	"Petarded"; Episode 6
Cloris Leachman	Herself	"Petarded"; Episode 6
Natasha Melnick	Ruth Cochamer	"Petarded"; Episode 6
Michael York	British man	"Petarded"; Episode 6
Jessica Biel	Brooke	"Brian the Bachelor"; Episode 7
John Erwin	He-Man	"Brian the Bachelor"; Episode 7
Nancy Cartwright	Casey Kelp Daffney Griffin	"Brian the Bachelor"; Episode 7
Drew Pinsky	The Dermatologist	"Brian the Bachelor"; Episode 7
Joanna García	Liddane	"8 Simple Rules for Buying My Teenage Daughter"; Episode 8
Brian Tochi	Helicopter pilot	"Breaking Out Is Hard to Do"; Episode 9
Michael Dorn	Worf	"Peter's Got Woods"; Episode 11
Jonathan Frakes	William Riker	"Peter's Got Woods"; Episode 11
Patrick Stewart	Jean-Luc Picard	"Peter's Got Woods"; Episode 11
Gabrielle Union	Shauna Parks	"Peter's Got Woods"; Episode 11
James Woods	Himself	"Peter's Got Woods"; Episode 11
Adam Carolla	Death	"Perfect Castaway"; Episode 12
Jenna von Oÿ	Rory	"Perfect Castaway"; Episode 12
Carrie Fisher	Angela	"Jungle Love"; Episode 13
Mía Maestro	Loca	"Jungle Love"; Episode 13
Jay Mohr	Joe Pesci	"Jungle Love"; Episode 13
Bob Barker	Himself	"The Fat Guy Strangler"; Episode 17
Robert Downey Jr.	Patrick Pewterschmidt	"The Fat Guy Strangler"; Episode 17
Will Sasso	Todd	"The Fat Guy Strangler"; Episode 17
Paula Abdul^{*}^{#}	Herself	"The Father, the Son, and the Holy Fonz"; Episode 18
Tom Bosley	Howard Cunningham	"The Father, the Son, and the Holy Fonz"; Episode 18
Sherman Hemsley	Himself	"The Father, the Son, and the Holy Fonz"; Episode 18
Marion Ross	Marion Cunningham	"The Father, the Son, and the Holy Fonz"; Episode 18
Sarah Utterback	Lindsay Lohan	"The Father, the Son, and the Holy Fonz"; Episode 18
Mark Borchardt	Himself	"Brian Sings and Swings"; Episode 19
Frank Sinatra Jr.	Himself	"Brian Sings and Swings"; Episode 19
Jeff Bergman	Fred Flintstone	"Patriot Games"; Episode 20
Tom Brady	Himself	"Patriot Games"; Episode 20
Troy Brown	Himself	"Patriot Games"; Episode 20
Carol Channing^{C}	Herself	"Patriot Games"; Episode 20
Bob Costas	Himself	"Patriot Games"; Episode 20
Jay Leno	Himself	"Patriot Games"; Episode 20
Alexander Siddig	One of the London Silly Nannies	"Patriot Games"; Episode 20
Adam Carolla	Death	"I Take Thee Quagmire"; Episode 21
Bryan Cranston	Hal	"I Take Thee Quagmire"; Episode 21
Beth Littleford	Jane Kaczmarek; Mother at park	"I Take Thee Quagmire"; Episode 21
Christy Carlson Romano	Quagmire's one-night stand	"I Take Thee Quagmire"; Episode 21
Alex Trebek	Himself	"I Take Thee Quagmire"; Episode 21
Wallace Shawn	Bertram	"Sibling Rivalry"; Episode 22
Chris Wedge	Scrat	"Sibling Rivalry"; Episode 22
Kate Jackson	Mrs. King	"Deep Throats"; Episode 23
Frank Welker	Fred Jones; Kermit the Frog	"Deep Throats"; Episode 23
Tamera Mowry	Book customer	"Peterotica"; Episode 24
Betty White	Herself	"Peterotica"; Episode 24
Stark Sands	Justin Hackeysack	"You May Now Kiss the...Uh...Guy Who Receives"; Episode 25
Bob Costas	Himself	"Petergeist"; Episode 26
Carrot Top	Himself	"Petergeist"; Episode 26
Judith Light	Herself	"Untitled Griffin Family History"; Episode 27
Drew Barrymore	Herself	"Stewie B. Goode"; Episode 28
Noel Blanc	Elmer Fudd	"Stewie B. Goode"; Episode 28
Ron Livingston	Video store clerk	"Stewie B. Goode"; Episode 28
René Auberjonois	Odo	"Bango Was His Name, Oh!"; Episode 29
Jennie Garth	Kelly Taylor	"Bango Was His Name, Oh!"; Episode 29
Larry Kenney	Lion-O	"Bango Was His Name, Oh!"; Episode 29
Lynne Lipton	Cheetara	"Bango Was His Name, Oh!"; Episode 29
Jason Priestley	Brandon Walsh	"Bango Was His Name, Oh!"; Episode 29
Tori Spelling	Donna Martin	"Bango Was His Name, Oh!"; Episode 29
Joy Behar	Herself	"Stu and Stewie's Excellent Adventure"; Episode 30
Michael Clarke Duncan	Stork	"Stu and Stewie's Excellent Adventure"; Episode 30
Kiefer Sutherland	24 opening narrator	"Stu and Stewie's Excellent Adventure"; Episode 30

^{*}Live-action role ^{#}Archive footage
^{C}This would be Carol Channing's final film/television role.

== Season 5 ==
Name	Role(s)	Episode
Ellen Albertini Dow	Elderly woman	"Stewie Loves Lois"; Episode 1
Phyllis Diller	Thelma Griffin	"Mother Tucker"; Episode 2
Tamera Mowry	Esther	"Mother Tucker"; Episode 2
Gore Vidal^{G}	Himself	"Mother Tucker"; Episode 2
Louis Gossett Jr.	Himself	"Saving Private Brian"; Episode 4
Samm Levine	Joey	"Saving Private Brian"; Episode 4
Drew Barrymore	Jillian	"Whistle While Your Wife Works"; Episode 5
Carrie Fisher	Angela	"Whistle While Your Wife Works"; Episode 5
Drew Barrymore	Jillian	"Prick Up Your Ears"; Episode 6
David Cross	Jerry Kirkwood	"Prick Up Your Ears"; Episode 6
Drew Barrymore	Jillian	"Chick Cancer"; Episode 7
Drew Barrymore	Jillian	"Barely Legal"; Episode 8
Garrett Morris^{*}	Headmaster of the New York School for the Hard of Hearing	"Barely Legal"; Episode 8
Tamera Mowry	Esther	"Barely Legal"; Episode 8
Bill Fagerbakke^{#}^{†}	Patrick Star	"Road to Rupert"; Episode 9
Gene Kelly^{*}^{#}^{†}	Joseph Brady	"Road to Rupert"; Episode 9
Tom Kenny^{#}^{†}	SpongeBob SquarePants	"Road to Rupert"; Episode 9
Rob Lowe	Stanford Cordray	"Road to Rupert"; Episode 9
George Wendt	Norm Peterson	"Road to Rupert"; Episode 9
Phyllis Diller	Thelma Griffin	"Peter's Two Dads"; Episode 10
Charles Durning	Francis Griffin	"Peter's Two Dads"; Episode 10
Tamera Mowry	Waitress	"Peter's Two Dads"; Episode 10
Keir Gilchrist	Kyle	"The Tan Aquatic with Steve Zissou"; Episode 11
Hugh Hefner	Himself	"Airport '07"; Episode 12
Roy Scheider	Himself	"Bill and Peter's Bogus Journey"; Episode 13
Conway Twitty^{*}^{#}	Himself	"Bill and Peter's Bogus Journey"; Episode 13
Patrick Stewart	Peter Griffin with Patrick Stewart's voice	"No Meals on Wheels"; Episode 14
Ben Stiller	Himself	"No Meals on Wheels"; Episode 14
Drew Barrymore	Jillian	"Boys Do Cry"; Episode 15
Bill Engvall	Duke Dillon	"Boys Do Cry"; Episode 15
Gilbert Gottfried	Horse	"Boys Do Cry"; Episode 15
Neil Patrick Harris	Barney Stinson	"No Chris Left Behind"; Episode 16
Josh Radnor	Ted Mosby	"No Chris Left Behind"; Episode 16
Ashley Ferl^{*}^{#}^{†}	Herself	"It Takes a Village Idiot, and I Married One"; Episode 17
Don Most	Himself	"It Takes a Village Idiot, and I Married One"; Episode 17
Keith Olbermann	Bob Grossbeard	"It Takes a Village Idiot, and I Married One"; Episode 17
Adam Carolla	Death	"Meet the Quagmires"; Episode 18

^{*}Live-action role ^{#}Archive footage ^{†}Uncredited
^{G}This would be Gore Vidal's final television role.

== Season 6 ==
Name	Role(s)	Episode
Chevy Chase	Clark Griswold	"Blue Harvest"; Episode 1
Beverly D'Angelo	Ellen Griswold	"Blue Harvest"; Episode 1
Mick Hucknall	Himself	"Blue Harvest"; Episode 1
Rush Limbaugh	Himself	"Blue Harvest"; Episode 1
Judd Nelson^{D}	John Bender	"Blue Harvest"; Episode 1
Leslie Nielsen^{#}	Dr. Rumack	"Blue Harvest"; Episode 1
Helen Reddy	Herself	"Blue Harvest"; Episode 1
Drew Barrymore	Jillian	"Movin' Out (Brian's Song)"; Episode 2
Jeff Bergman	Homer Simpson	"Movin' Out (Brian's Song)"; Episode 2
Jamie Farr	Himself	"Believe It or Not, Joe's Walking on Air"; Episode 3
Paula Abdul	Herself	"Lois Kills Stewie"; Episode 5
Simon Cowell	Himself	"Lois Kills Stewie"; Episode 5
Randy Jackson	Himself	"Lois Kills Stewie"; Episode 5
Patrick Stewart	Avery Bullock	"Lois Kills Stewie"; Episode 5
Phyllis Diller	Thelma Griffin	"Padre de Familia"; Episode 6
Alex Fernandez	Gerardo	"Padre de Familia"; Episode 6
Carrie Fisher	Angela	"Padre de Familia"; Episode 6
Gabriel Iglesias	Mexican #5	"Padre de Familia"; Episode 6
Jeff Bergman	Fred Flintstone	"Peter's Daughter"; Episode 7
Pat Crawford Brown	Sanka dancer	"Peter's Daughter"; Episode 7
Conway Twitty^{*}^{#}	Himself	"Peter's Daughter"; Episode 7
Ricardo Montalbán	The Cow	"McStroke"; Episode 8
Barry Manilow	Himself	"Back to the Woods"; Episode 9
David Van Dam	David Letterman	"Back to the Woods"; Episode 9
James Woods	Himself	"Back to the Woods"; Episode 9
Chace Crawford	Dylan	"The Former Life of Brian"; Episode 11
Harvey Fierstein	Tracy	"The Former Life of Brian"; Episode 11
Amanda Bynes	Anna	"Long John Peter"; Episode 12

^{D}Appearance in a deleted scene only ^{#}Archive footage ^{*}Live-action role

== Season 7 ==
Name	Role(s)	Episode
Meredith Baxter	Herself	"Love Blactually"; Episode 1
Kat Foster	Carolyn	"Love Blactually"; Episode 1
Ike Barinholtz	Dane Cook	"I Dream of Jesus"; Episode 2
Russ Leatherman	Mr. Moviefone	"I Dream of Jesus"; Episode 2
Debra Wilson	Star Jones	"I Dream of Jesus"; Episode 2
Brian Blessed	Prince Vultan	"Road to Germany"; Episode 3
Gregory Jbara	Nazi guard Nazi general German priest	"Road to Germany"; Episode 3
Johnny Knoxville	Himself	"The Man with Two Brians"; Episode 5
Bob Barker	Himself	"Tales of a Third Grade Nothing"; Episode 6
Elisha Cuthbert	New Bedford	"Tales of a Third Grade Nothing"; Episode 6
Andy Dick	Himself	"Tales of a Third Grade Nothing"; Episode 6
Caitlyn Jenner	Bruce Jenner^{B}	"Tales of a Third Grade Nothing"; Episode 6
Debbie Reynolds	Mrs. Wilson	"Tales of a Third Grade Nothing"; Episode 6
Frank Sinatra Jr.	Himself	"Tales of a Third Grade Nothing"; Episode 6
Sinbad	Himself	"Tales of a Third Grade Nothing"; Episode 6
J.P. Manoux	Alan Harper	"Ocean's Three and a Half"; Episode 7
Frank Welker	Megatron	"Ocean's Three and a Half"; Episode 7
Meredith Baxter	Herself	"Family Gay"; Episode 8
Seth Rogen	Peter Griffin with the Seth Rogen gene	"Family Gay"; Episode 8
Jeff Bergman	O. J. Simpson	"The Juice Is Loose"; Episode 9
Conway Twitty^{*}^{#}	Himself	"The Juice Is Loose"; Episode 9
Peter Chernin	Himself	"FOX-y Lady"; Episode 10
Ed Helms	Al Gore	"FOX-y Lady"; Episode 10
John Moschitta Jr.	Himself	"FOX-y Lady"; Episode 10
Seth Rogen	Himself	"FOX-y Lady"; Episode 10
Fred Savage	Himself	"FOX-y Lady"; Episode 10
Daniel Stern	Fred Savage's voice over	"FOX-y Lady"; Episode 10
Patrick Stewart	Himself	"Not All Dogs Go to Heaven"; Episode 11
LeVar Burton	Himself	"Not All Dogs Go to Heaven"; Episode 11
Michael Dorn	Himself	"Not All Dogs Go to Heaven"; Episode 11
Jonathan Frakes	Himself	"Not All Dogs Go to Heaven"; Episode 11
Gates McFadden	Herself	"Not All Dogs Go to Heaven"; Episode 11
Brent Spiner	Himself	"Not All Dogs Go to Heaven"; Episode 11
Marina Sirtis	Herself	"Not All Dogs Go to Heaven"; Episode 11
Wil Wheaton	Himself	"Not All Dogs Go to Heaven"; Episode 11
Denise Crosby	Herself	"Not All Dogs Go to Heaven"; Episode 11
Rob Lowe^{*}	Himself	"Not All Dogs Go to Heaven"; Episode 11
Meredith Baxter	Elyse Keaton	"Stew-Roids"; Episode 13
Chace Crawford	Jock #2; Popular kid Trainer	"Stew-Roids"; Episode 13
Camille Guaty	Gina	"Stew-Roids"; Episode 13
Wentworth Miller	Jock #4; Popular kid #2	"Stew-Roids"; Episode 13
Drew Barrymore	Jillian	"We Love You, Conrad"; Episode 14
Lauren Conrad	Herself	"We Love You, Conrad"; Episode 14
Jimmy Fallon^{*}	Himself	"We Love You, Conrad"; Episode 14
Craig Ferguson^{*}	Himself	"We Love You, Conrad"; Episode 14
Jay Leno^{*}	Himself	"We Love You, Conrad"; Episode 14
Audrina Patridge	Herself	"We Love You, Conrad"; Episode 14
Kate Todd	Heidi Montag	"We Love You, Conrad"; Episode 14
Sarah Utterback	Lindsay Lohan	"We Love You, Conrad"; Episode 14
Richard Dreyfuss	Narrator	"Three Kings"; Episode 15
Roy Scheider^{R}	Himself	"Three Kings"; Episode 15
George Wendt	Norm Peterson	"Three Kings"; Episode 15
Neil Patrick Harris	Barney Stinson	"Peter's Progress"; Episode 16
Josh Radnor	Ted Mosby	"Peter's Progress"; Episode 16
Jason Segel	Marshall Eriksen	"Peter's Progress"; Episode 16

^{*}Live-action role ^{#}Archive footage
^{B}Taking place prior to her coming out as trans and undergoing gender reassignment surgery, Caitlyn was considered to be playing herself, as she was known then as Bruce Jenner.
^{R}This would be Roy Scheider's final film/television role.

== Season 8 ==
Name	Role(s)	Episode
Jeff Bergman	Max Weinstein	"Family Goy"; Episode 2
Charles Durning	Francis Griffin	"Family Goy"; Episode 2
Ben Stein	Rabbi Goldberg	"Family Goy"; Episode 2
William Woodson^{WW}	Super Friends announcer	"Family Goy"; Episode 2
Dan Aykroyd	Themselves	"Spies Reminiscent of Us"; Episode 3
Chevy Chase	Themselves	"Spies Reminiscent of Us"; Episode 3
Gary Cole	Mike Brady	"Spies Reminiscent of Us"; Episode 3
James Lipton^{*}	Himself	"Spies Reminiscent of Us"; Episode 3
Hart Bochner^{*}^{#}	Harry Ellis	"Brian's Got a Brand New Bag"; Episode 4
George Christy	Dr. Hasseldorf	"Brian's Got a Brand New Bag"; Episode 4
Paul Gleason^{*}^{#}	Deputy Chief Dwayne T. Robinson	"Brian's Got a Brand New Bag"; Episode 4
Reginald VelJohnson^{*}^{#}	Sgt. Al Powell	"Brian's Got a Brand New Bag"; Episode 4
Nana Visitor	Rita	"Brian's Got a Brand New Bag"; Episode 4
Tico Wells	Bobby Brown	"Brian's Got a Brand New Bag"; Episode 4
Bruce Willis^{*}^{#}	John McClane	"Brian's Got a Brand New Bag"; Episode 4
Candace Marie	Miley Cyrus	"Hannah Banana"; Episode 5
Brittany Snow	Candy	"Quagmire's Baby"; Episode 6
Thomas F. Wilson	First step	"Quagmire's Baby"; Episode 6
Nathan Gunn	Italian opera singer	"Dog Gone"; Episode 8
Chris Matthews	Himself	"Dog Gone"; Episode 8
Johnny Galecki	Leonard Hofstadter	"Business Guy"; Episode 9
Hugh Laurie	Gregory House	"Business Guy"; Episode 9
Bobby Lee	Sharply dressed Asian man	"Business Guy"; Episode 9
Jim Parsons	Sheldon Cooper	"Business Guy"; Episode 9
Dwayne Johnson^{*}	Himself	"Big Man on Hippocampus"; Episode 10
Adrianne Palicki	Tiffani Amber Thiessen	"Big Man on Hippocampus"; Episode 10
Dave Boat	Latino in hardhat	"Dial Meg for Murder"; Episode 11
Peter Chen	Chinese NASCAR drivers	"Dial Meg for Murder"; Episode 11
Chace Crawford	Luke	"Dial Meg for Murder"; Episode 11
Camille Guaty	Gina	"Dial Meg for Murder"; Episode 11
Allison Janney	Teen People editor	"Dial Meg for Murder"; Episode 11
Andrea Fay Friedman	Ellen	"Extra Large Medium"; Episode 12
Michele Lee	Estelle Harris	"Extra Large Medium"; Episode 12
Stephen Bishop	Himself	"Go Stewie Go"; Episode 13
Mo Collins	Little girl	"Go Stewie Go"; Episode 13
Colin Ford	Randall	"Go Stewie Go"; Episode 13
Anne Hathaway	Mother Maggie	"Go Stewie Go"; Episode 13
Nana Visitor	Audition caller	"Go Stewie Go"; Episode 13
Max Burkholder	Child doctor	"Peter-assment"; Episode 14
Richard Dreyfuss	Himself	"Peter-assment"; Episode 14
Carrie Fisher	Angela	"Peter-assment"; Episode 14
Jim Goldenberg	TMZ crew	"Peter-assment"; Episode 14
Max Hodges	TMZ crew	"Peter-assment"; Episode 14
Harvey Levin	TMZ crew	"Peter-assment"; Episode 14
Rob Lotterstein	Himself	"Brian Griffin's House of Payne"; Episode 15
Danielle Panabaker	James Woods' daughter	"Brian Griffin's House of Payne"; Episode 15
Charlie Sheen	Himself	"Brian Griffin's House of Payne"; Episode 15
Elijah Wood	Himself	"Brian Griffin's House of Payne"; Episode 15
James Woods	Himself	"Brian Griffin's House of Payne"; Episode 15
Anne Hathaway	Herself	"April in Quahog"; Episode 16
Jason Mraz	Some guy with a hat	"April in Quahog"; Episode 16
Marc Alaimo	The Dean	"The Splendid Source"; Episode 19
Sanaa Lathan	Donna Tubbs-Brown	"The Splendid Source"; Episode 19
David Lynch	Gus the Bartender	"The Splendid Source"; Episode 19
Kevin Michael Richardson	Cleveland Brown, Jr.	"The Splendid Source"; Episode 19
John Bunnell	Himself	"Something Something Something Dark Side"; Episode 20
James Caan	Himself	"Something Something Something Dark Side"; Episode 20
Joe Flaherty	Western Union man	"Something Something Something Dark Side"; Episode 20
Dolph Lundgren^{*}^{#}	Ivan Drago	"Something Something Something Dark Side"; Episode 20
Brigitte Nielsen^{*}^{#}	Ludmilla Vobet Drago	"Something Something Something Dark Side"; Episode 20
Michael Pataki^{*}^{#}	Nicoli Koloff	"Something Something Something Dark Side"; Episode 20
Tom Selleck^{*}^{#}	Phil Blackwood	"Something Something Something Dark Side"; Episode 20
James Woods	Himself General Veers	"Something Something Something Dark Side"; Episode 20
Julia Sweeney	Naomi Robinson	"Partial Terms of Endearment"; Episode 21
Wil Wheaton	Protestor	"Partial Terms of Endearment"; Episode 21
Michael York	Nature narrator	"Partial Terms of Endearment"; Episode 21

^{*}Live-action role ^{#}Archive footage
^{WW}This marked William Woodson's final film/television role.

== Season 9 ==
Name	Role(s)	Episode
Drew Barrymore	Jillian	"And Then There Were Fewer"; Episode 1
Max Burkholder	Child	"And Then There Were Fewer"; Episode 1
Colin Ford	Child	"And Then There Were Fewer"; Episode 1
Patrick Stewart	Cat	"And Then There Were Fewer"; Episode 1
Ashley Tisdale	Priscilla	"And Then There Were Fewer"; Episode 1
James Woods	Himself	"And Then There Were Fewer"; Episode 1
Rush Limbaugh	Himself	"Excellence in Broadcasting"; Episode 2
Shelley Long	Carol Brady	"Excellence in Broadcasting"; Episode 2
Nana Visitor	Nancy Pelosi	"Excellence in Broadcasting"; Episode 2
Rainn Wilson	Dwight Schrute	"Excellence in Broadcasting"; Episode 2
Max Burkholder	Altar boy mouse	"Welcome Back, Carter"; Episode 3
Barclay DeVeau	Patty	"Halloween on Spooner Street"; Episode 4
Noah Matthews	Bully	"Halloween on Spooner Street"; Episode 4
Natasha Melnick	Ruth	"Halloween on Spooner Street"; Episode 4
Christina Milian	Esther	"Halloween on Spooner Street"; Episode 4
Lyndon Smith	Bully #2	"Halloween on Spooner Street"; Episode 4
Patrick Stewart	Dick Pump	"Halloween on Spooner Street"; Episode 4
Nana Visitor	Justin's mom	"Halloween on Spooner Street"; Episode 4
Lisa Wilhoit	Connie D'Amico	"Halloween on Spooner Street"; Episode 4
Carrie Fisher	Angela	"Baby, You Knock Me Out"; Episode 5
Dana Gould^{*}	Himself	"Brian Writes a Bestseller"; Episode 6
Arianna Huffington^{*}	Herself	"Brian Writes a Bestseller"; Episode 6
Bill Maher^{*}	Himself	"Brian Writes a Bestseller"; Episode 6
Ashley Tisdale	Kelly	"Brian Writes a Bestseller"; Episode 6
Drew Barrymore	Jillian	"Road to the North Pole"; Episode 7
David Boreanaz	Himself	"Road to the North Pole"; Episode 7
Carrie Fisher	Angela	"Road to the North Pole"; Episode 7
Ron MacFarlane^{*}	The Narrator	"Road to the North Pole"; Episode 7
Bruce McGill	Santa Claus	"Road to the North Pole"; Episode 7
Will Ryan	Winnie-the-Pooh	"Road to the North Pole"; Episode 7
Nana Visitor	Mother	"Road to the North Pole"; Episode 7
Yvette Nicole Brown	Black woman	"New Kidney in Town"; Episode 8
Drew Carey	Himself	"New Kidney in Town"; Episode 8
Kirker Butler	Guest	"And I'm Joyce Kinney"; Episode 9
Helen Reddy	Herself	"And I'm Joyce Kinney"; Episode 9
Adam Carolla	Death	"Friends of Peter G."; Episode 10
Carrie Fisher	Angela	"Friends of Peter G."; Episode 10
Jessica Stroup	Crowd member	"Friends of Peter G."; Episode 10
Laura Vandervoort	AA member	"Friends of Peter G."; Episode 10
Alan Tudyk	German pilot	"German Guy"; Episode 11
Colin Ford	Kid	"The Hand That Rocks the Wheelchair"; Episode 12
Patrick Stewart	Susie Swanson	"The Hand That Rocks the Wheelchair"; Episode 12
Nina Dobrev	Gina	"Trading Places"; Episode 13
Carrie Fisher	Angela	"Trading Places"; Episode 13
Laura Vandervoort	Third Bully Girl	"Trading Places"; Episode 13
Lisa Wilhoit	Connie D'Amico	"Trading Places"; Episode 13
Drew Barrymore	Jillian	"Tiegs for Two"; Episode 14
Jessica Stroup	Denise	"Tiegs for Two"; Episode 14
Cheryl Tiegs	Herself	"Tiegs for Two"; Episode 14
Frank Welker	Megatron	"Tiegs for Two"; Episode 14
Meredith Baxter	Elise Keaton	"Brothers & Sisters"; Episode 15
Michael Gross	Steven Keaton	"Brothers & Sisters"; Episode 15
Julie Hagerty	Carol Pewterschmidt	"Brothers & Sisters"; Episode 15
Robert Loggia^{*}	Himself	"Brothers & Sisters"; Episode 15
Sarah Ramos	Teenage girl	"Brothers & Sisters"; Episode 15
Joe Flaherty	Vatican worker	"The Big Bang Theory"; Episode 16
Wallace Shawn	Bertram	"The Big Bang Theory"; Episode 16
David Bowie^{*}^{#}	Themselves	"Foreign Affairs"; Episode 17
Mick Jagger^{*}^{#}	Themselves	"Foreign Affairs"; Episode 17
Dee Bradley Baker	Klaus Heissler/Admiral Ackbar	"It's a Trap!"; Episode 18
Michael Dorn	Worf	"It's a Trap!"; Episode 18
Mary Hart	Herself	"It's a Trap!"; Episode 18
Anne Hathaway	Hot blonde	"It's a Trap!"; Episode 18
Rush Limbaugh	Rancor	"It's a Trap!"; Episode 18
Bruce McGill	John Williams	"It's a Trap!"; Episode 18
Patrick Stewart	Jean-Luc Picard	"It's a Trap!"; Episode 18
Conway Twitty^{*}^{#}	Darth Twitty	"It's a Trap!"; Episode 18

^{*}Live-action role ^{#}Archive footage

== Season 10 ==
Name	Role(s)	Episode
Judy Greer	Showgirl dancer	"Lottery Fever"; Episode 1
Dee Bradley Baker	Hooded monster	"Seahorse Seashell Party"; Episode 2
Kaitlin Olson	Brenda	"Screams of Silence: The Story of Brenda Q"; Episode 3
Adam Alexi-Malle	Adzin	"Stewie Goes for a Drive"; Episode 4
Ryan Reynolds	Himself	"Stewie Goes for a Drive"; Episode 4
Lacey Chabert	Pilot episode Meg	"Back to the Pilot"; Episode 5
Scott Grimes	Kevin Swanson	"Thanksgiving"; Episode 6
Julie Hagerty	Carol West	"Thanksgiving"; Episode 6
Patrick Stewart	Susie Swanson	"Thanksgiving"; Episode 6
Ari Graynor	Woman	"Amish Guy"; Episode 7
Bobby Lee	Chinese man	"Amish Guy"; Episode 7
Missi Pyle	Woman	"Amish Guy"; Episode 7
Kevin Michael Richardson	Roadblock	"Amish Guy"; Episode 7
Bob Gunton	Warden	"Cool Hand Peter"; Episode 8
Sanaa Lathan	Donna Tubbs-Brown	"Cool Hand Peter"; Episode 8
Adam Carolla	Death	"Grumpy Old Man"; Episode 9
Jack Carter	Old man	"Grumpy Old Man"; Episode 9
D.C. Douglas	Superman	"Grumpy Old Man"; Episode 9
R. Lee Ermey	Drill sergeant	"Grumpy Old Man"; Episode 9
Joel David Moore	Old man watching Avatar	"Grumpy Old Man"; Episode 9
Linda Porter	Old woman	"Grumpy Old Man"; Episode 9
Marlee Matlin	Stella	"The Blind Side"; Episode 11
Rob Corddry	Ben	"Livin' on a Prayer"; Episode 12
Judy Greer	Hope	"Livin' on a Prayer"; Episode 12
Mark Harmon	Leroy Jethro Gibbs	"Tom Tucker: The Man and His Dream"; Episode 13
Danielle Harris^{*}^{#}	Jamie Lloyd	"Tom Tucker: The Man and His Dream"; Episode 13
David Herman	David Strathairn	"Tom Tucker: The Man and His Dream"; Episode 13
Sanaa Lathan	Clair Huxtable	"Tom Tucker: The Man and His Dream"; Episode 13
Elliot Page	Lindsey	"Tom Tucker: The Man and His Dream"; Episode 13
George P. Wilbur^{*}^{#}	Michael Myers	"Tom Tucker: The Man and His Dream"; Episode 13
James Woods	Himself	"Tom Tucker: The Man and His Dream"; Episode 13
Ricky Gervais	Billy Finn	"Be Careful What You Fish For"; Episode 14
Lucy Davis	Joanne Finn	"Be Careful What You Fish For"; Episode 14
Scott Bakula^{*}	Himself	"Burning Down the Bayit"; Episode 15
Jeff Ross	Himself	"Killer Queen"; Episode 16
Eddie Kaye Thomas	Barry Robinson	"Killer Queen"; Episode 16
Katharine McPhee	Mother Maggie	"You Can't Do That on Television, Peter"; Episode 18
Cate Blanchett	Penelope	"Mr. and Mrs. Stewie"; Episode 19
Omid Abtahi	Prince Faisal	"Leggo My Meg-O"; Episode 20
Alexa Ray Joel	Young girl	"Tea Peter"; Episode 21
Anna Kendrick	Nora	"Internal Affairs"; Episode 23

^{*}Live-action role ^{#}Archive footage

== Season 11 ==
Name	Role(s)	Episode
Elizabeth Banks	Pam Fishman	"Into Fat Air"; Episode 1
J. J. Abrams	Himself	"Ratings Guy"; Episode 2
Sandra Bernhard	Herself	"Ratings Guy"; Episode 2
Mark Burnett	Himself	"Ratings Guy"; Episode 2
Dan Castellaneta	Homer Simpson	"Ratings Guy"; Episode 2
Michael Clarke Duncan^{MCD}	Co-worker with cowboy boots	"Ratings Guy"; Episode 2
Billy Gardell	Mike Biggs	"Ratings Guy"; Episode 2
Jon Hamm	Himself	"Ratings Guy"; Episode 2
Dick Wolf	Himself	"Ratings Guy"; Episode 2
John de Lancie	Pewterschmidt Industries executive	"The Old Man and the Big 'C'"; Episode 3
Jim Parsons	Gay-Jacker	"Joe's Revenge"; Episode 5
Will Sasso	Bobby 'The Shirt' Briggs	"Joe's Revenge"; Episode 5
Patrick Stewart	Susie Swanson	"Joe's Revenge"; Episode 5
Johnny Depp	Edward Scissorhands	"Lois Comes Out of Her Shell"; Episode 6
Ellen Albertini Dow	Aunt Helen	"Jesus, Mary and Joseph!"; Episode 8
Ryan Reynolds	Overweight guy	"Jesus, Mary and Joseph!"; Episode 8
Brian Williams	Himself	"Space Cadet"; Episode 9
Alan Bennett	Himself	"Brian's Play"; Episode 10
Megan Hilty	Helen Keller's teacher Old woman	"The Giggity Wife"; Episode 11
Sofía Vergara	Flower saleswoman Hispanic woman	"The Giggity Wife"; Episode 11
Drew Barrymore	Jillian Russell	"Valentine's Day in Quahog"; Episode 12
Jessica Biel	Brooke Roberts	"Valentine's Day in Quahog"; Episode 12
Kat Foster	Carolyn	"Valentine's Day in Quahog"; Episode 12
Jessica Stroup	Denise	"Valentine's Day in Quahog"; Episode 12
Cheryl Tiegs	Herself	"Valentine's Day in Quahog"; Episode 12
Nana Visitor	Rita	"Valentine's Day in Quahog"; Episode 12
Anne Murray	Herself	"Chris Cross"; Episode 13
Robert Romanus^{*}^{#}	Mike Damone	"Chris Cross"; Episode 13
Christine Baranski	Herself	"Call Girl"; Episode 14
Robert Loggia^{*}^{R}	Himself	"Call Girl"; Episode 14
Giovanni Ribisi	Randy	"Call Girl"; Episode 14
Omid Abtahi	Mahmoud	"Turban Cowboy"; Episode 15
Bob Costas	Himself	"Turban Cowboy"; Episode 15
Padma Lakshmi	Herself	"12 and a Half Angry Men"; Episode 16
Mike Judge	Hank Hill	"Bigfat"; Episode 17
Bill Maher	Himself	"Bigfat"; Episode 17
Wendy Schaal	Francine Smith	"Bigfat"; Episode 17
Carly Simon	Herself	"Total Recall"; Episode 18
Tim Gunn	Himself	"Save the Clam"; Episode 19
Hank Azaria	Reginald Barrington	"No Country Club for Old Men"; Episode 22
Sean Bean	Portrait of Peter Griffin's ancestor	"No Country Club for Old Men"; Episode 22
Nick Cannon	Himself	"No Country Club for Old Men"; Episode 22
Tom Hiddleston	Statue of Peter Griffin's ancestor	"No Country Club for Old Men"; Episode 22
Sharon Osbourne	Herself	"No Country Club for Old Men"; Episode 22
Emma Roberts	Amanda Barrington	"No Country Club for Old Men"; Episode 22

^{*}Live-action role ^{#}Archive footage
^{MCD}Airing after his death, the episode was dedicated in Duncan's memory. ^{R}This marked Robert Loggia's final appearance on a television series prior to his death in 2015.

== Season 12 ==
Name	Role(s)	Episode
Yvette Nicole Brown	Woman	"Finders Keepers"; Episode 1
Lea Thompson	Lorraine McFly	"Finders Keepers"; Episode 1
Carrie Fisher	Angela	"Vestigial Peter"; Episode 2
Patrick Stewart	Narrator	"Vestigial Peter"; Episode 2
Adam Levine	Himself	"Quagmire's Quagmire"; Episode 3
Jeff Daniels	Himself	"A Fistful of Meg"; Episode 4
Christina Milian	Esther	"A Fistful of Meg"; Episode 4
Michelle Dockery	British woman	"Boopa-dee Bappa-dee"; Episode 5
Yvette Nicole Brown	Mourning woman	"Life of Brian"; Episode 6
Tony Sirico	Vinny	"Life of Brian"; Episode 6
Nick Kroll	Ricky	"Into Harmony's Way"; Episode 7
Conan O'Brien	Himself	"Into Harmony's Way"; Episode 7
Tony Sirico	Vinny	"Into Harmony's Way"; Episode 7
Tony Sirico	Vinny	"Christmas Guy"; Episode 8
Carrie Fisher	Angela	"Peter Problems"; Episode 9
Marlee Matlin	Stella	"Peter Problems"; Episode 9
Brad Goreski	Gay man #1	"Grimm Job"; Episode 10
Ashley Benson	Dakota	"Brian's a Bad Father"; Episode 11
Liam Neeson	Himself	"Brian's a Bad Father"; Episode 11
Lauren Bacall^{L}	Evelyn	"Mom's the Word"; Episode 12
Ariana Grande	Italian daughter	"Mom's the Word"; Episode 12
Adam Carolla	Death	"3 Acts of God"; Episode 13
C. J. Spiller	Himself	"3 Acts of God"; Episode 13
Mario Williams	Himself	"3 Acts of God"; Episode 13
Cary Elwes	Dr. Watson	"Secondhand Spoke"; Episode 15
Bryan Cranston^{*}	Himself	"Herpe the Love Sore"; Episode 16
Patrick Stewart	Cutaway narrator	"Herpe the Love Sore"; Episode 16
Dennis Farina^{D}	Himself	"The Most Interesting Man in the World"; Episode 17
Keke Palmer	Pam	"Baby Got Black"; Episode 18
Cedric Yarbrough	Lobster	"Baby Got Black"; Episode 18
Sanaa Lathan	Donna Tubbs-Brown	"He's Bla-ack!"; Episode 20
Cary Elwes	Dr. Watson	"Chap Stewie"; Episode 21
Isaac Hempstead-Wright	Aidan	"Chap Stewie"; Episode 21
Rick Springfield	Himself	"Chap Stewie"; Episode 21
David Thewlis	British father	"Chap Stewie"; Episode 21

^{*}Live-action role
^{L}This is Lauren Bacall's final film or television role prior to her death.
^{D}This is Dennis Farina's final television role, airing after his death in 2013.

== Season 13 ==
Name	Role(s)	Episode
Hank Azaria	Moe Szyslak; Apu Nahasapeemapetilon; Carl Carlson; Chief Wiggum; Comic Book Guy; Lou; Dr. Nick Riviera	"The Simpsons Guy"; Episode 1
H. Jon Benjamin	Bob Belcher	"The Simpsons Guy"; Episode 1
Jeff Bergman	Fred Flintstone	"The Simpsons Guy"; Episode 1
Julie Bowen	Claire Dunphy	"The Simpsons Guy"; Episode 1
Nancy Cartwright	Bart Simpson; Maggie Simpson; Nelson Muntz; Ralph Wiggum; Todd Flanders	"The Simpsons Guy"; Episode 1
Dan Castellaneta	Homer Simpson; Abraham Simpson; Krusty the Clown; Barney Gumble; Hans Moleman; Kodos; Mayor Quimby; Santa's Little Helper; Squeaky-Voiced Teen; Blue-Haired Lawyer	"The Simpsons Guy"; Episode 1
Julie Kavner	Marge Simpson; Patty and Selma	"The Simpsons Guy"; Episode 1
Harry Shearer	Lenny Leonard; Video Erotich customer	"The Simpsons Guy"; Episode 1
Yeardley Smith	Lisa Simpson	"The Simpsons Guy"; Episode 1
James Woods	Himself	"The Simpsons Guy"; Episode 1
Mason Cook	Boy in wheelchair	"The Book of Joe"; Episode 2
Glenn Howerton	Blake Walker	"The Book of Joe"; Episode 2
Maya Rudolph	JoAnne Shalit	"The Book of Joe"; Episode 2
Connie Britton	Herself	"Baking Bad"; Episode 3
Carl Lumbly	Loan officer	"Baking Bad"; Episode 3
Ana Ortiz	Cinnamon	"Baking Bad"; Episode 3
Emily Osment	Girl in bed on TV	"Baking Bad"; Episode 3
Yvette Nicole Brown	Jerome's mom	"Brian the Closer"; Episode 4
Emily Osment	Uncomfortably Hot 18-Year-Old Girl	"Turkey Guys"; Episode 5
Jeff Garlin	Himself	"The 2000-Year-Old Virgin"; Episode 6
Ana Gasteyer	Speed dater	"The 2000-Year-Old Virgin"; Episode 6
Glenn Howerton	Massage chair guy	"The 2000-Year-Old Virgin"; Episode 6
Emily Osment	Girl in Santa Hat/Carrie Underwood	"The 2000-Year-Old Virgin"; Episode 6
Hank Azaria	Nigel Harpington	"Stewie, Chris & Brian's Excellent Adventure"; Episode 7
Tony Sirico^{*}	Himself	"Stewie, Chris & Brian's Excellent Adventure"; Episode 7
Emily Osment	Ruth	"Our Idiot Brian"; Episode 8
Allison Janney	Crystal Quagmire	"Quagmire's Mom"; Episode 10
Emily Osment	Kira	"Quagmire's Mom"; Episode 10
Nat Faxon	Jet Li villain	"Encyclopedia Griffin"; Episode 11
Allison Janney	Mistriss Vieda	"Encyclopedia Griffin"; Episode 11
Harvey Fierstein	Buster Keaton	"Stewie Is Enciente"; Episode 12
Lea Thompson	Teenaged girl in diner	"#JOLO"; Episode 14
Chris Hardwick	Johnny Lawrence	"Once Bitten"; Episode 15
Cristin Milioti	Karen; Andrea	"Roasted Guy"; Episode 16
T.J. Miller	Volcano	"Roasted Guy"; Episode 16
Liam Neeson	Himself	"Fighting Irish"; Episode 17
Michael Bublé	Bublé wrap	"Take My Wife"; Episode 18
Sanaa Lathan	Donna Tubbs-Brown	"Take My Wife"; Episode 18

^{*}Live-action role ^{#}Archive footage

== Season 14 ==
Name	Role(s)	Episode
Jon Daly	Javier Bardem	"Pilling Them Softly"; Episode 1
Sanaa Lathan	Donna Tubbs-Brown	"Pilling Them Softly"; Episode 1
Cary Elwes	Charles Dickens	"Papa Has a Rollin' Son"; Episode 2
Ed O'Neill	Bud Swanson	"Papa Has a Rollin' Son"; Episode 2
John Mellencamp	Himself	"Peternormal Activity"; Episode 4
Emily Osment	Hiker Girl in Movie	"Peternormal Activity"; Episode 4
Kate McKinnon	Karen Griffin	"Peter's Sister"; Episode 6
Belita Moreno	Rosario Vargas	"Peter's Sister"; Episode 6
Joe Buck	Himself	"Brokeback Swanson"; Episode 8
Margaret Cho	Hee-Sun	"Candy, Quahog Marshmallow"; Episode 10
Carrie Fisher	Angela	"Candy, Quahog Marshmallow"; Episode 10
Sung Kang	Soap opera actor	"Candy, Quahog Marshmallow"; Episode 10
Ashton Kutcher^{*}	Himself	"Candy, Quahog Marshmallow"; Episode 10
C.S. Lee	Soap opera actor	"Candy, Quahog Marshmallow"; Episode 10
Chad L. Coleman	African gunman	"Scammed Yankees"; Episode 12
Neil deGrasse Tyson	Himself	"Scammed Yankees"; Episode 12
Martha MacIsaac	Patty	"Scammed Yankees"; Episode 12
Christina Milian	Esther	"Scammed Yankees"; Episode 12
Tia Carrere	Hawaiian woman	"An App a Day"; Episode 13
Kate McKinnon	Philippa	"An App a Day"; Episode 13
Carl Reiner	Old man	"An App a Day"; Episode 13
Jon Daly	Oliver Platt	"Underage Peter"; Episode 14
Cary Elwes	Edison's assistant	"Underage Peter"; Episode 14
Julie Hagerty	Carol West	"Underage Peter"; Episode 14
Jay Leno	Mayor Jay Leno	"Underage Peter"; Episode 14
Glenn Close	Herself	"A Lot Going on Upstairs"; Episode 15
Breckin Meyer	S&M guy	"A Lot Going on Upstairs"; Episode 15
Mary Kay Place	Farting lady	"The Heartbreak Dog"; Episode 16
Katharine Ross	Mrs. Abbott	"The Heartbreak Dog"; Episode 16
Paget Brewster	Gretchen Mercer	"Take A Letter"; Episode 17
Ken Marino	Dallas Portland	"The New Adventures of Old Tom"; Episode 18
Simon Cowell	Himself	"Run, Chris, Run"; Episode 19
Liam Payne	Himself	"Run, Chris, Run"; Episode 19
Louis Tomlinson	Himself	"Run, Chris, Run"; Episode 19
Barkhad Abdi	Abduwali Muse	"Road to India"; Episode 20
Rob Huebel	Business meeting leader	"Road to India"; Episode 20
Anil Kapoor	Himself	"Road to India"; Episode 20
Russell Peters	Padma's father	"Road to India"; Episode 20
Sheetal Sheth	Padma; Tapeworm	"Road to India"; Episode 20

^{*}Live-action role

== Season 15 ==
Name	Role(s)	Episode
Nicole Byer	Airport security worker	"The Boys in the Band"; Episode 1
Jenna Lamia	Mrs. Wong	"The Boys in the Band"; Episode 1
Nolan North	The Turtlenecks	"The Boys in the Band"; Episode 1
Amy Schumer	Crew leader	"The Boys in the Band"; Episode 1
Tony Sirico	Vinny	"The Boys in the Band"; Episode 1
Kyle Chandler	Coach Doyle	"Bookie of the Year"; Episode 2
Frank Sinatra Jr.^{F}	Himself	"Bookie of the Year"; Episode 2
Kelen Coleman	Woman #3; Hooker #2	"American Gigg-olo"; Episode 3
Gary Newman	Himself	"Inside Family Guy"; Episode 4
David Tennant	The Doctor	"Inside Family Guy"; Episode 4
Dana Walden	Herself	"Inside Family Guy"; Episode 4
James Woods	Himself	"Inside Family Guy"; Episode 4
Mark-Paul Gosselaar	Zack Morris	"Chris Has Got a Date, Date, Date, Date, Date"; Episode 5
Sean Penn	Himself	"Hot Shots"; Episode 6
Heléne Yorke	Waitress	"High School English"; Episode 7
Carrie Fisher	Angela	"Carter and Tricia"; Episode 8
David Lynch	Himself	"How the Griffin Stole Christmas"; Episode 9
Kate McKinnon	Farmer's date	"How the Griffin Stole Christmas"; Episode 9
Ty Simpkins	Little Drummer Boy	"How the Griffin Stole Christmas"; Episode 9
Stephen Curry	Himself	"Passenger Fatty-Seven"; Episode 10
Sanaa Lathan	Donna Tubbs-Brown	"Passenger Fatty-Seven"; Episode 10
Chris Gronkowski	Himself	"Gronkowsbees"; Episode 11
Dan Gronkowski	Himself	"Gronkowsbees"; Episode 11
Glenn Gronkowski	Himself	"Gronkowsbees"; Episode 11
Rob Gronkowski	Himself	"Gronkowsbees"; Episode 11
Marlee Matlin	Stella	"Peter's Def Jam"; Episode 12
Flea	Himself	"Peter's Def Jam"; Episode 12
Carrot Top	Himself	"The Finer Strings"; Episode 13
Colin Ford	Football player	"The Finer Strings"; Episode 13
Martha MacIsaac	Patty	"The Finer Strings"; Episode 13
Kiff VandenHeuvel	Sheriff Woody	"The Finer Strings"; Episode 13
Ed Westwick	Football player Wedding officiant	"The Finer Strings"; Episode 13
Robert Wu	Mr. Washee-Washee	"The Finer Strings"; Episode 13
Christina Pickles	Queen Elizabeth II	"The Dating Game"; Episode 14
Heléne Yorke	Sandra	"The Dating Game"; Episode 14
Nat Faxon	Coach Herrera	"Cop and a Half-Wit"; Episode 15
Ana Ortiz	Maid	"Cop and a Half-Wit"; Episode 15
Heléne Yorke	Schwarzenegger's Target Date	"Cop and a Half-Wit"; Episode 15
Neil Brown Jr.	Athlete with money	"Saturated Fat Guy"; Episode 16
Martha MacIsaac	Patty	"Saturated Fat Guy"; Episode 16
Christina Milian	Esther	"Saturated Fat Guy"; Episode 16
Wade Boggs	Himself	"Peter's Lost Youth"; Episode 17
Lenny Clarke	Fantasy baseball coach	"Peter's Lost Youth"; Episode 17
Carrie Fisher	Angela	"Peter's Lost Youth"; Episode 17
Carl Reiner	Fantasy baseball coach	"Peter's Lost Youth"; Episode 17
Colin Ford	Kid	"The Peter Principal"; Episode 18
Jermaine Fowler	Kid	"The Peter Principal"; Episode 18
Anders Holm	Superintendent	"The Peter Principal"; Episode 18
Shawn Michael Howard	New Orleans band	"The Peter Principal"; Episode 18
Martha MacIsaac	Patty	"The Peter Principal"; Episode 18
Christina Milian	Esther	"The Peter Principal"; Episode 18
Wendy Schaal	Secretary	"The Peter Principal"; Episode 18
Kiernan Shipka	Meg's Bully/Singing cheerleader	"The Peter Principal"; Episode 18
Lisa Wilhoit	Connie D'Amico	"The Peter Principal"; Episode 18
Daniele Gaither	Traffic violations officer	"Dearly Deported"; Episode 19
Aimee Garcia	Isabella	"Dearly Deported"; Episode 19
Portia de Rossi	Bonnie Swanson's prank call voice	"A House Full of Peters"; Episode 20
Sanaa Lathan	Donna Tubbs-Brown	"A House Full of Peters"; Episode 20
Olesya Rulin	Russian Meg Griffin	"A House Full of Peters"; Episode 20

^{F}This marked Frank Sinatra Jr.'s final film/television role.

== Season 16 ==
Name	Role(s)	Episode
Asa Akira^{*}	Herself	"Emmy-Winning Episode"; Episode 1
Julie Bowen	Herself	"Emmy-Winning Episode"; Episode 1
Ty Burrell^{*}	Himself	"Emmy-Winning Episode"; Episode 1
Frances Callier	Shonda Rhimes	"Emmy-Winning Episode"; Episode 1
Louis C.K.	Himself	"Emmy-Winning Episode"; Episode 1
Jonathan Kite	Alec Baldwin	"Emmy-Winning Episode"; Episode 1
Bill Maher	Himself	"Emmy-Winning Episode"; Episode 1
Miriam Margolyes	Maggie Smith's right eyeball	"Emmy-Winning Episode"; Episode 1
Ryan O'Neal^{*}^{#}	Tim Madden	"Emmy-Winning Episode"; Episode 1
Christina Pickles	Maggie Smith's left eyeball	"Emmy-Winning Episode"; Episode 1
Sofía Vergara	Herself	"Emmy-Winning Episode"; Episode 1
Chris Diamantopoulos	Stryker Foxx	"Foxx in the Men House"; Episode 2
Ignacio Serricchio^{†}	Jonathan Goldsmith	"Foxx in the Men House"; Episode 2
Kathleen Turner	Peter Griffin	"Foxx in the Men House"; Episode 2
Chris Diamantopoulos	Fievel Mousekewitz	"Nanny Goats"; Episode 3
Sanaa Lathan	Donna Tubbs-Brown	"Nanny Goats"; Episode 3
Ryan Reynolds	Himself	"Follow the Money"; Episode 4
Carrie Fisher	Angela	"Three Directors"; Episode 5
Kristen Bell	Martha	"Petey IV"; Episode 7
Jeff Probst	Himself	"Petey IV"; Episode 7
Iwan Rheon	George Harrison; John Lennon; Ring announcer	"Petey IV"; Episode 7
Carrie Fisher^{C}	Angela	"Don't Be a Dickens at Christmas"; Episode 9
Norm MacDonald	Himself	"Don't Be a Dickens at Christmas"; Episode 9
David Mazouz	Peter's co-worker	"Don't Be a Dickens at Christmas"; Episode 9
Jay Pharaoh	Kanye Canes	"Don't Be a Dickens at Christmas"; Episode 9
Don Swayze	Patrick Swayze	"Don't Be a Dickens at Christmas"; Episode 9
Amanda Seyfried	Ellie	"Boy (Dog) Meets Girl (Dog)"; Episode 10
Dikembe Mutombo	Himself	"Dog Bites Bear"; Episode 11
Danny Trejo^{*}	Himself	"Dog Bites Bear"; Episode 11
Ian McKellen	Dr. Cecil Pritchfield	"Send in Stewie, Please"; Episode 12
Tom Ellis	Oscar Wilde	"V is for Mystery"; Episode 13
Tom Hollander	Distinguished man #2	"V is for Mystery"; Episode 13
Eric Dane	Himself	"Veteran Guy"; Episode 14
Kenny Loggins	Himself	"Veteran Guy"; Episode 14
Tom Cochrane^{*}^{#}^{†}	Himself	"The Woof of Wall Street"; Episode 15
Esther Ku	Secretary	"The Woof of Wall Street"; Episode 15
Sanaa Lathan	Donna Tubbs-Brown	"'Family Guy' Through the Years"; Episode 16
Chris Diamantopoulos	Parker Stanton	"HTTPete"; Episode 18
Ignacio Serricchio	Pitbull	"The Unkindest Cut"; Episode 19
Pej Vahdat^{†}	Middle Eastern co-pilot	"The Unkindest Cut"; Episode 19

^{*}Live-action role ^{#}Archive footage ^{†}Uncredited
^{C}This would be Carrie Fisher's final television appearance, following her death in 2016.

== Season 17 ==
Name	Role(s)	Episode
Sanaa Lathan	Fangirl	"Married with Cancer"; Episode 1
Jay Pharaoh	Kanye West	"Married with Cancer"; Episode 1
Casey Wilson	Jess	"Married with Cancer"; Episode 1
Casey Wilson	Jess	"Dead Dog Walking"; Episode 2
Eva Bella	Kid	"Pal Stewie"; Episode 3
Aries Spears	Eddie Murphy	"Pal Stewie"; Episode 3
Gilbert Gottfried	Dog whistle	"Big Trouble in Little Quahog"; Episode 4
Kyrie Irving	Vernon the Waterbear	"Big Trouble in Little Quahog"; Episode 4
Patrick Stewart	Patrick the Waterbear	"Big Trouble in Little Quahog"; Episode 4
Aries Spears	Shaquille O'Neal	"Regarding Carter"; Episode 5
Kimberly Brooks	Black sitcom mom	"Stand by Meg"; Episode 6
Scott Grimes	Kevin Swanson	"Stand by Meg"; Episode 6
Tara Lipinski	Herself	"The Griffin Winter Games"; Episode 7
Ross Marquand	Garth Brooks	"The Griffin Winter Games"; Episode 7
Jim Meskimen	Ron Howard	"The Griffin Winter Games"; Episode 7
Christine Baranski	Newport heiress	"Con Heiress"; Episode 8
Sanaa Lathan	Donna Tubbs-Brown	"Con Heiress"; Episode 8
Christina Pickles	Newport heiress	"Con Heiress"; Episode 8
Wendy Schaal	Newport heiress	"Con Heiress"; Episode 8
Bryan Cranston	Bert	"Pawtucket Pete"; Episode 9
Billy Eichner	Himself	"Pawtucket Pete"; Episode 9
Andrew Kishino	Goose	"Pawtucket Pete"; Episode 9
Sanaa Lathan	Fangirl	"Pawtucket Pete"; Episode 9
Niecy Nash	Sheila	"Pawtucket Pete"; Episode 9
Tara Strong	Fangirl	"Pawtucket Pete"; Episode 9
Ross Marquand	George H. W. Bush; Johnny Depp	"Trump Guy"; Episode 11
Charlet Chung	Brittany hologram	"Bri, Robot"; Episode 12
Bryan Cranston	Bert	"Trans-Fat"; Episode 13
Niecy Nash	Sheila	"Trans-Fat"; Episode 13
Maurice LaMarche^{†}	Conan O'Brien	"Trans-Fat"; Episode 13
Bryan Cranston	Bert	"Family Guy Lite"; Episode 14
Sanaa Lathan	Donna Tubbs-Brown	"Family Guy Lite"; Episode 14
Ross Marquand	Slinky	"Family Guy Lite"; Episode 14
Niecy Nash	Sheila	"Family Guy Lite"; Episode 14
Mandy Moore	Courtney	"No Giggity, No Doubt"; Episode 15
Casey Wilson	Gymnastics team mom	"No Giggity, No Doubt"; Episode 15
Chris Parnell	Priest	"You Can't Handle the Booth"; Episode 16
Sarah Paulson	Herself; Marcia Clark; Costumed woman	"You Can't Handle the Booth"; Episode 16
Judy Greer	Luna Bar lover Middle-aged woman	"Island Adventure"; Episode 17
Chris Parnell	Doug	"Island Adventure"; Episode 17
Christine Lakin	Joyce Kinney; Quagmire's Date	"Throw It Away"; Episode 18
Sanaa Lathan	Donna Tubbs-Brown; Backup singer	"Throw It Away"; Episode 18
Sam Elliott	Himself	"Girl, Internetted"; Episode 19
Denis Leary	Car mechanic	"Girl, Internetted"; Episode 19
Julie Hagerty	Carol Pewterschmidt	"Adam West High"; Episode 20

^{†}Uncredited

== Season 18 ==
Name	Role(s)	Episode
Bryan Cranston	Bert	"Yacht Rocky"; Episode 1
Lucas Grabeel	Chad	"Yacht Rocky"; Episode 1
Sanaa Lathan	Donna Tubbs-Brown	"Yacht Rocky"; Episode 1
Kenny Loggins	Himself	"Yacht Rocky"; Episode 1
Niecy Nash	Sheila	"Yacht Rocky"; Episode 1
Alan Parsons	Himself	"Yacht Rocky"; Episode 1
Nick Viall	Himself	"Yacht Rocky"; Episode 1
Carlos Alazraqui	Chef	"Bri-Da"; Episode 2
Eugene Byrd	Ups Deliveryman	"Bri-Da"; Episode 2
Bryan Cranston	Bert	"Bri-Da"; Episode 2
Scott Grimes	Kevin Swanson	"Bri-Da"; Episode 2
Robert Herjavec	Himself	"Bri-Da"; Episode 2
Bryan Cranston	Bert	"Disney's The Reboot"; Episode 4
Judy Greer	Herself	"Disney's The Reboot"; Episode 4
Martha MacIsaac	Patty	"Disney's The Reboot"; Episode 4
Emily Osment	Ruth Cochamer	"Disney's The Reboot"; Episode 4
Gary Newman	Himself	"Disney's The Reboot"; Episode 4
Chris Parnell	Smarmy J. Tiestraightener III	"Disney's The Reboot"; Episode 4
Dana Walden	Herself	"Disney's The Reboot"; Episode 4
Daisy Fuentes	Herself	"Peter & Lois' Wedding"; Episode 6
Mike Judge	Beavis and Butt-Head	"Peter & Lois' Wedding"; Episode 6
Carlos Alazraqui	Warden	"Shanksgiving"; Episode 8
Hank Azaria	Police Superintendent Chalmers	"Shanksgiving"; Episode 8
Nat Faxon	Neo-Nazi	"Shanksgiving"; Episode 8
Danny Trejo	Clint Beltran	"Shanksgiving"; Episode 8
Jimmy Connors	Himself	"Christmas is Coming"; Episode 9
Chris Parnell	Subway Manager	"Christmas is Coming"; Episode 9
Lisa Wilhoit	Connie D'Amico	"Connie's Celica"; Episode 10
Christopher Meloni	George Townshend	"Short Cuts"; Episode 11
Dan Castellaneta	Homer Simpson	"The Movement"; Episode 14
Jerry Lambert	Man Congratulating Peter	"The Movement"; Episode 14
Kevin Nealon	Himself	"The Movement"; Episode 14
Khary Payton	King; Baseball Player	"The Movement"; Episode 14
Alex Pettyfer	Troy	"The Movement"; Episode 14
Brett Gelman	Escape Room Guy	"Baby Stewie"; Episode 15
Judy Greer	Bozo's Client; Sylvester Stallone's Assistant	"Baby Stewie"; Episode 15
Robert Wu	Korean General	"Baby Stewie"; Episode 15
Bryan Cranston	Bert; Judge	"Start Me Up"; Episode 16
Martha MacIsaac	Airport Announcer	"Start Me Up"; Episode 16
Ross Marquand	Indiana Jones; Jesse Eisenberg	"Start Me Up"; Episode 16
Khary Payton	Abusive Father	"Start Me Up"; Episode 16
Dan Castellaneta	Homer Simpson	"Coma Guy"; Episode 17
Alfred Molina	Panamanian Man	"Coma Guy"; Episode 17
Carlos Alazraqui	Chief Justice John Roberts	"Better Off Meg"; Episode 18
Lucas Grabeel	Student	"Better Off Meg"; Episode 18
Ali Hillis	Meg's Friend	"Better Off Meg"; Episode 18
Esther Ku	Meg's Friend	"Better Off Meg"; Episode 18
Kristen Li	Funeral Girl #1	"Better Off Meg"; Episode 18
Chris Parnell	Priest; Father Raccoon	"Better Off Meg"; Episode 18
Stephanie Beatriz	Hostess	"Holly Bibble"; Episode 19
Edie McClurg	Herself as Grace	"Holly Bibble"; Episode 19
Liam McIntyre	Wombat	"Holly Bibble"; Episode 19
Chris Parnell	Highway Man	"Holly Bibble"; Episode 19
Allison Munn	Suits Actress; Accused Witch; Autograph Seeker	"Movin' In (Principal Shepherd's Song)"; Episode 20
Chris Parnell	Doug	"Movin' In (Principal Shepherd's Song)"; Episode 20
Ignacio Serricchio	Lawnmower Guy	"Movin' In (Principal Shepherd's Song)"; Episode 20
