= Grumpy Old Man =

- Family Guy episode
- Carter falls asleep before the car crash.
- Episode no.: Season 10; Episode 9
- Directed by: John Holmquist
- Written by: Dave Ihlenfeld; David Wright
- Production code: 9ACX07
- Original air date: December 11, 2011

Guest appearances
- Adam Carolla as Death; Jack Carter as Various; D. C. Douglas as Superman; R. Lee Ermey as Drill Sergeant; Christine Lakin as Joyce Kinney; Joel David Moore as Avatar; Linda Porter as Old woman; Floyd Van Buskirk as Various; Mae Whitman as Fat girl; Wally Wingert as Various

Episode chronology
← Previous "Cool Hand Peter"	Next → "Meg and Quagmire"
- Family Guy season 10

"Grumpy Old Man" is the ninth episode of the tenth season of the American animated sitcom Family Guy, and the 174th episode overall. The episode originally aired on Fox in the United States on December 11, 2011. The episode follows Griffin family matriarch Lois Griffin's father, Carter Pewterschmidt, after he accidentally falls asleep while driving in a snowstorm. Concerned for his safety, Lois decides to admit him to a nursing home in Florida, in an attempt to help him adjust to life as an older man. Carter is reluctant to live in the retirement community, however, but eventually comes to enjoy the various activities at the home. Six months later, Carter suddenly becomes grumpy, and even more elderly, causing Peter to take him back to his old business and bring him back to normal.

The episode was written by Dave Ihlenfeld and David Wright, and directed by John Holmquist. It received mostly mixed reviews from critics for its storyline, and many cultural references. According to Nielsen ratings, it was viewed in 6.10 million homes in its original airing. The episode featured guest performances by Adam Carolla, Jack Carter, D. C. Douglas, R. Lee Ermey, Christine Lakin, Joel David Moore, Linda Porter, Floyd Van Buskirk, Mae Whitman and Wally Wingert, along with several recurring guest voice actors for the series.

== Plot ==
A snowstorm has hit Quahog, Rhode Island, with Stewie set to visit his grandparents, Carter and Barbara Pewterschmidt, at their mansion. While on the drive there, Carter falls asleep at the wheel and crashes his car into a tree. The three are admitted to the hospital, where Joe Swanson alerts Carter that his driver's license has to be revoked because of Carter's old age. Barbara then suggests that the two retire. Carter is reluctant at first, since he does not want to leave a $6 billion company, but he eventually agrees to do so, admitting that he never had free time for himself. Later that day, the retired Carter decides to visit his son-in-law Peter along with his friends Joe and Quagmire at the local bar to learn about their discussions of their lives at home, much to their chagrin. Carter also moves in with the Griffin family and attempts to find someone to hang out with, including Quagmire.

Peter voices his distaste of the situation, and he suggests that they put Carter and Barbara in a retirement community in Florida. Impressed at first at the surroundings, Carter then refuses to live in the community, fearing that the people living there are just waiting to die, but Peter convinces him to live in the home, and promises to show him how great it is to be retired. The two then perform various tasks, including playing bingo and trying out the thermostat in their room, and Carter then eventually agrees to live there.

Six months later, Barbara calls the Griffin family, alerting him that something is wrong with Carter. When they arrive, they discover that he has become lethargic. Attempting to fix him, Peter, Lois, and Barbara take him back to his old business in Quahog. Peter is able to provoke Carter out of his state by ordering Carter's secretary to modernise the business, which Carter angrily rejects. Carter then warns Barbara, Peter, and Lois never to put him in a retirement home again, vowing to continue running his business until the day he dies. Peter's mother Thelma calls Peter from her nursing home; Peter is unwilling to talk to her, refuses to believe that she is being molested, and refuses to commit to seeing her at Thanksgiving. He and Lois agree that Thelma will remain at the home.

== Cultural references ==
The title of the episode is a reference to the movie Grumpy Old Men. The scene where the drill sergeant with Alzheimer's disease is repeatedly cursing at a man he calls a "joker" is a reference to the Vietnam War movie Full Metal Jacket, which starred R. Lee Ermey. The scene where Mayor West seems to wake up from a dream, only to find that he is in another dream may be a reference to the movie Inception about false awakening. Joe Swanson's Fiona Apple tribute video is a parody of her 1997 song "Criminal". When Peter talks about him and Lois having "phone sax", a cutaway shows them playing songs on the saxophone via the phone. Peter plays "Baker Street" by Gerry Rafferty while Lois plays "You Can Call Me Al" by Paul Simon. The cut away scene where the man who was late for work, and as a result wasn't killed on 9/11, is possibly a reference to Seth MacFarlane himself. He would have been onboard American Airlines Flight 11, had he not been late for check in.

== Production and development ==
The episode was directed by series regular John Holmquist, shortly after the conclusion of the ninth production season, in his second episode of the season, the first being "Amish Guy". Holmquist joined the series in its second season, directing the episode "Running Mates", which was written by Neil Goldman and Garrett Donovan. The episode was written by Dave Ihlenfeld and David Wright, both in their first episode of the series. Series regulars Peter Shin and James Purdum served as supervising directors, with Andrew Goldberg and Alex Carter as executive story editors, and Spencer Porter, Anthony Blasucci, Mike Desilets and Deepak Sethi serving as staff writers for the episode. Composer Walter Murphy, who has worked on the series since its inception, returned to compose the music for "Grumpy Old Man". In addition to their roles of Peter and Lois Griffin, Series creator and executive producer Seth MacFarlane and main cast member and former series writer Alex Borstein reprise their roles of Carter and Barbara Pewterschmidt, Lois's parents. This episode reveals that Peter's mother, Thelma, moved into a retirement home. Eight months after the episode's initial broadcast, Phyllis Diller, Thelma's voice actor, died.

In addition to the regular cast, actor and comedian Adam Carolla, actor Jack Carter, actor D. C. Douglas, actor and drill instructor R. Lee Ermey, actress Christine Lakin, actor Joel David Moore, actress Linda Porter, voice actor Floyd Van Buskirk, actress Mae Whitman and voice actor Wally Wingert, guest starred in the episode. Recurring guest voice actors Ralph Garman, writer Julius Sharpe, actress Jennifer Tilly, writer Chris Sheridan, writer Danny Smith, writer Alec Sulkin and writer John Viener made minor appearances throughout the episode. Recurring guest cast members Adam West and Patrick Warburton also appeared in the episode.

== Reception ==
"Grumpy Old Man" was broadcast on December 11, 2011, as a part of an animated television night on Fox, and was preceded by The Simpsons and The Cleveland Show, and followed by Family Guy creator and executive producer Seth MacFarlane's second series, American Dad!. It was watched by 6.10 million viewers, according to Nielsen ratings, despite airing simultaneously with Charlie and the Chocolate Factory on ABC, The Amazing Race on CBS and Sunday Night Football on NBC. The episode also acquired a 3.1/7 rating in the 18–49 demographic, beating The Simpsons, The Cleveland Show and American Dad!, in addition to significantly edging out The Cleveland Show and American Dad! shows in total viewership. The episode's ratings decreased significantly from the previous week's episode, "Cool Hand Peter".
