= Thanksgiving (Family Guy) =

- Family Guy episode
- Episode no.: Season 10; Episode 6
- Directed by: Jerry Langford
- Written by: Patrick Meighan
- Production code: 9ACX04
- Original air date: November 20, 2011

Guest appearances
- Max Burkholder as Grandchild/Child; Jackson Douglas; Kevin Durand; Colin Ford as Iraqi Child/Pilgrim Child/Younger Kevin; Zachary Gordon as Homeless Little Boy; Scott Grimes as Kevin Swanson; Julie Hagerty as Carol West; Jonathan Morgan Heit as Child; Christine Lakin as Joyce Kinney; Patrick Stewart as Susie Swanson's monologue

Episode chronology
← Previous "Back to the Pilot"	Next → "Amish Guy"
- Family Guy season 10

"Thanksgiving" is the sixth episode of the tenth season of the animated comedy series Family Guy, and the 171st episode overall. It originally aired on Fox in the United States on November 20, 2011. The episode follows the Griffin family, and several of their neighbors, as they celebrate the Thanksgiving holiday. As they sit down for dinner, they are surprised that Kevin Swanson, son of their neighbors Joe and Bonnie Swanson, has returned from Iraq.

The episode was written by Patrick Meighan and directed by Jerry Langford. It received mostly mixed reviews from critics for its storyline, and many cultural references. According to Nielsen ratings, it was viewed in 6.04 million homes in its original airing. The episode featured guest performances by Max Burkholder, Jackson Douglas, Kevin Durand, Karen Strassman, Colin Ford, Zachary Gordon, Scott Grimes, Julie Hagerty, Jonathan Morgan Heit, Christine Lakin and Patrick Stewart, along with several recurring guest voice actors for the series.

== Plot ==
As the Thanksgiving holiday begins, Lois invites Glenn and Ida Quagmire, the Swansons, Mayor Adam West, and Carter, Babs and Carol Pewterschmidt to join the Griffin family for a Thanksgiving dinner. Tensions are still high between Ida, Quagmire and Brian since Ida's sex reassignment surgery and her one-night stand with Brian the previous year.

Once they begin eating their meal, another guest arrives at the door. It is Kevin Swanson, the son of Joe and Bonnie Swanson, who had been reported killed in the Iraq War. Overjoyed, the Swansons ask how they could have been misinformed. Kevin tells them a story about having been in a coma after a bomb hidden in a Thanksgiving turkey detonated, killing the rest of his unit. While having dessert, Kevin voices his distaste for the war, and gives inconsistent details about his injuries and recovery in Iraq. When Joe confronts these, Kevin confesses that he went A.W.O.L.. Suffering survivor guilt, he faked his own death in order to return home. Joe arrests him for the crime of desertion. Bonnie criticizes him for lying about being a war hero.

Brian asks Kevin to explain why he deserted the army. Kevin tells him that he had grown tired of the war, and had befriended many of the Iraqis. Kevin and his family begin arguing over the United States's occupation of Iraq. Brian sympathizes with him. Ida, herself a war veteran, disagrees with Kevin's choice to desert. Kevin reminds his father of a time when Joe took pity on a homeless man and let him get away with stealing a can of soup to feed his hungry family. Still unhappy about Kevin disowning the army, Joe nevertheless agrees to let his son off the hook and the two make up.

As dinner ends, another man resembling Kevin enters the house and declares the first Kevin to be an imposter. However, Peter remarks that they don't time for this, ending the episode.

== Production and development ==
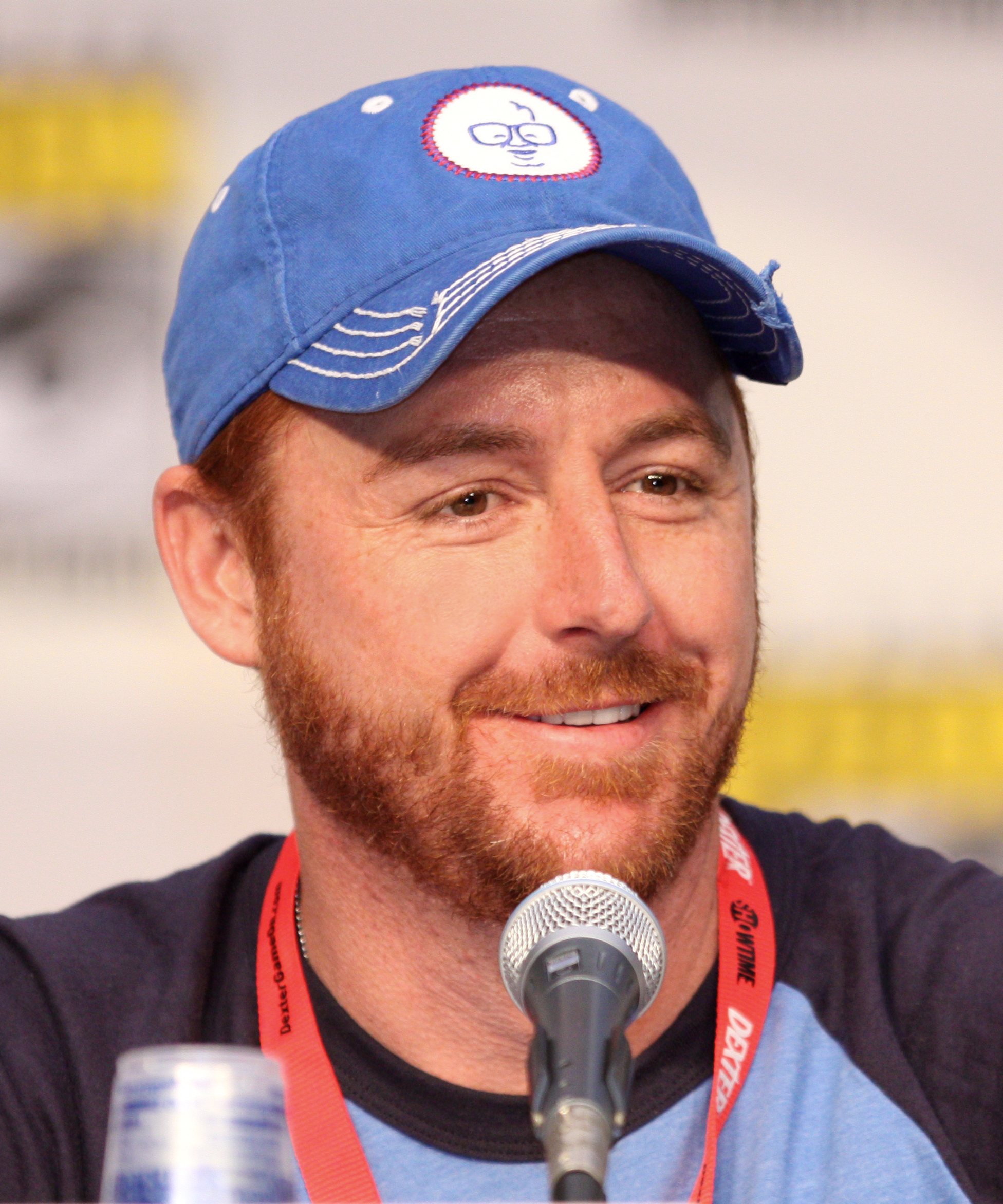
Actor Scott Grimes took over the role of Kevin Swanson.

The episode was directed by series regular Jerry Langford, shortly after the conclusion of the ninth production season, in his first episode of the season. Langford joined the series in its seventh season, directing the episode "Tales of a Third Grade Nothing". The episode was written by series regular Patrick Meighan, who joined the show as a writer in its fourth season, writing the episode "8 Simple Rules for Buying My Teenage Daughter". Series regulars Peter Shin and James Purdum served as supervising directors, with Andrew Goldberg, Alex Carter, Spencer Porter, Anthony Blasucci, Mike Desilets, and Deepak Sethi serving as staff writers for the episode. Composer Ron Jones, who has worked on the series since its inception, returned to compose the music for "Thanksgiving".

The role of Kevin Swanson has been portrayed by several people, including actor Jon Cryer, in the second season episode "There's Something About Paulie". In subsequent appearances, Kevin was voiced by series creator and executive producer Seth MacFarlane, until his eventual disappearance from the series, when it was revealed that he had supposedly died in Iraq. Actor Scott Grimes, who notably portrays the character Steve Smith in MacFarlane's second animated series American Dad!, took over the role of Kevin in the episode.

In addition to Grimes and the regular cast, actor Max Burkholder, actor Jackson Douglas, actor Kevin Durand, voice actor Colin Ford, actor Zachary Gordon, actress and model Julie Hagerty, actor Jonathan Morgan Heit, actress Christine Lakin and actor Patrick Stewart guest starred in the episode. Recurring guest voice actors Alexandra Breckenridge, actor Chris Cox, writer Mike Desilets, actor Ralph Garman, writer Gary Janetti, writer Danny Smith, writer Alec Sulkin, and writer John Viener also made minor appearances throughout the episode. Recurring guest cast members Adam West, Jennifer Tilly and Patrick Warburton also appeared in the episode as Mayor Adam West, Bonnie Swanson, and Joe Swanson respectively.

== Cultural references ==
As the Griffin family prepare to sit down for their dinner, baby Stewie is shown watching television, with the annual Macy's Thanksgiving Day Parade taking place on the screen. Stewie notices a hot air balloon in the parade resembling himself. After the family decides to go to the Griffin family's backyard to play football, Joe approaches his son to encourage him to beat the other team. Joe then references the 2009 war film The Hurt Locker, with Kevin responding with disdain for the film, despite supposedly being in a coma during its release. Joe also goes on to point out that Kevin is wearing an Ed Hardy t-shirt, which also became popularized during his supposed coma, and despite Kevin telling his father that he flew straight home after he awoke. Later during dinner, when Kevin reveals that he went A.W.O.L., Peter makes an off the wall reference, causing the episode to cut to a room showing several of the show's editors, who become confused about what cutaway to play on the screen. They then decide to play a clip involving several characters from The Wizard of Oz, including the Cowardly Lion, who is shown to be actress Lindsay Lohan's gynecologist.

== Reception ==
"Thanksgiving" was broadcast on November 20, 2011, as a part of an animated television night on Fox, and was preceded by The Simpsons and Allen Gregory, and followed by Family Guy creator and executive producer Seth MacFarlane's second show, American Dad!. It was watched by 6.04 million viewers, according to Nielsen ratings, despite airing simultaneously with the American Music Awards on ABC, The Amazing Race on CBS and Sunday Night Football on NBC. The episode also acquired a 3.1/7 rating in the 18–49 demographic, beating The Simpsons, Allen Gregory, American Dad!, in addition to significantly edging out all three shows in total viewership. The episode's ratings increased slightly from the previous week's episode, "Back to the Pilot".

Reviews of the episode were mostly mixed. Kevin McFarland of The A.V. Club wrote of the episode, "I had a hard time listening to the characters spout out opinions, since none of them really made sense as character views and felt distinctly like the writers just wanted a place to dump their liberalisms – I don't want to only call out Seth MacFarlane because he didn't write this episode, but considering the little bit I know about the show's writer's room, it's pretty safe to assume he has final say on this sort of thing, especially given his 9/11 experience." He also compared the A-story to the television series South Park, noting, "It's very clear that South Park benefits from the short turnaround time between production and air, because it allows that show to comment very quickly on current events, and stay timely. Family Guy seems to do the exact opposite, waiting an extraordinarily long time to weigh in on a serious issue it doesn’t satirize for comedy." He ended his review by commenting, "After last week's bright spot, I knew we were headed back down for another helping of the usual misery, but this week offered neither a surprise nor an all-out failure, just expected, bland mediocrity." He graded the episode as a C. In a much more positive review, Terren R. Moore of Ology, writing, "It's just funny, and it's got a lot of ways of achieving that funniness, and it's definitely true that the show isn't always in its best form, but 'Thanksgiving' shows that Family Guy refuses to be dead yet." He also praised the episode for giving each character their own part in the episode, adding, "while most of the story revolves around Joe, Kevin, and Peter, the three kids and Brian also get time in as well." Moore also stated his enjoyment of the cultural references in the episode, stating, "It's all good fun, and the cutaways are also top notch, including Peter's First Holiday and The Cowardly Lion as Lindsay Lohan's gynecologist. I nearly fell out when Peter described his probably-black coworker who turned out to be a white guy, which I should have seen coming because it's very Family Guy, but still managed to get a laugh out of me." He gave the episode a nine out of ten.
