= Family Guy season 10 =

Season of television series

Family Guy
- Season 10
- DVD cover for Volume 11
- Showrunners: Mark Hentemann; Steve Callaghan
- Starring: Seth MacFarlane; Alex Borstein; Seth Green; Mila Kunis; Mike Henry
- No. of episodes: 23

Release
- Original network: Fox
- Original release: September 25, 2011 – May 20, 2012

Season chronology
- ← Previous; Season 9 Next → Season 11

The tenth season of Family Guy premiered on the Fox network from September 25, 2011, to May 20, 2012 with a one-hour broadcast of two episodes. The series follows the Griffin family, a dysfunctional family consisting of father Peter, mother Lois, daughter Meg, son Chris, baby Stewie and the family dog Brian, who reside in their hometown of Quahog, a fictional city in Rhode Island.

The executive producers for the ninth production season, which began in season ten, are Seth MacFarlane, Chris Sheridan, Danny Smith, Mark Hentemann, Steve Callaghan, Alec Sulkin, and Wellesley Wild. The showrunners are Hentemann and Callaghan.

During this season, Peter becomes friends with Ryan Reynolds (guest-voicing as himself), the Griffins win the lottery, Meg falls in love with an Amish boy as Peter goes to war with his family, Stewie starts driving Brian's car and accidentally crashes it, Meg dates Quagmire on her 18th birthday, Chris dates a girl who looks like Lois (voiced by Elliot Page), Quagmire asks Peter and Joe to help him kill his sister's (voiced by Kaitlin Olson) violently abusive boyfriend (voiced by Ralph Garman), Peter befriends a dolphin (voiced by Ricky Gervais), Kevin Swanson (voiced by Scott Grimes) surprisingly returns to Quahog on Thanksgiving, Lois kidnaps Stewie's sick friend, Brian gets a blind girlfriend who hates dogs, James Woods makes a shocking return after being killed last season when Peter becomes an agent to Tom Tucker, Meg delivers a few home truths while scolding her family for all the abuse she personally suffered, Peter has another showdown with his mortal enemy, and Brian and Stewie travel back in time to the premiere Family Guy episode.

Also, the hurricane-themed episode, "Seahorse Seashell Party", that was scheduled to air on May 1, 2011 as part of the ninth season, ended up being aired on October 2, 2011 as the second episode of this season and during a crossover called Night of the Hurricane with The Cleveland Show and American Dad!. It was put on hold because of the 2011 Super Outbreak, which killed an estimated 346 people in the Southern United States around the time of the planned original release date.

== Voice cast and characters ==
- Seth MacFarlane as Peter Griffin, Brian Griffin, Stewie Griffin, Glenn Quagmire, Tom Tucker, Carter Pewterschmidt, Dr. Elmer Hartman, Dan Quagmire/Ida Davis, Seamus Levine
- Alex Borstein as Lois Griffin, Tricia Takanawa, Barbara "Babs" Pewterschmidt
- Seth Green as Chris Griffin
- Mila Kunis as Meg Griffin
- Mike Henry as Cleveland Brown, John Herbert, Consuela, Bruce

=== Supporting characters ===
- Johnny Brennan as Mort Goldman
- Carrie Fisher as Angela
- Julie Hagerty as Carol Pewterschmidt-West
- Christine Lakin as Joyce Kinney
- Jennifer Tilly as Bonnie Swanson
- Patrick Warburton as Joe Swanson
- Adam West as Mayor Adam West

=== Guest Star Characters ===
- Sanaa Lathan as Donna Tubbs
- Eddie Kaye Thomas as Barry Robbinson

== Episodes ==
No. overall	No. in season	Title	Directed by	Written by	Original release date	Prod. code	U.S. viewers (millions)
166	1	"Lottery Fever"	Greg Colton	Andrew Goldberg	September 25, 2011	9ACX01	7.69
Lois announces to the family that they should start sticking with a budget — just as Peter comes in with 200,000 lottery tickets, one of which turns the lower-middle-class Griffins into multi-millionaires.
167	2	"Seahorse Seashell Party"	Brian Iles	Wellesley Wild	October 2, 2011	8ACX20	6.99
When a hurricane hits Quahog, Brian braves through the storm by taking magic mushrooms and goes through a surreal nightmare, Meanwhile, Meg becomes fed up with the abuse from her family, stands up to them, only for the family to fall apart without a scapegoat. Note: This episode continues a crossover event titled Night of the Hurricane that begins on The Cleveland Show season 3 episode 2 and concludes on American Dad! season 8 episode 2.
168	3	"Screams of Silence: The Story of Brenda Q"	Dominic Bianchi	Alec Sulkin	October 30, 2011	8ACX21	5.96
After Quagmire gets sent to the hospital after a near death of autoerotic asphyxiation, he soon discovers that the real threat is that his younger sister, Brenda, is still with her abusive boyfriend Jeffery, and persuades Peter and Joe to help him stop the situation once and for all.
169	4	"Stewie Goes for a Drive"	Julius Wu	Gary Janetti	November 6, 2011	9ACX02	5.82
Actor Ryan Reynolds visits Quahog and befriends Peter, who is wary that Reynolds may like him as more than just a friend. Meanwhile, Stewie gets into trouble when he steals Brian's car for a drive and ends up crashing it onto a streetlight in the process, afraid of facing punishments, he decides to run away to Consuela's home until Brian finds him.
170	5	"Back to the Pilot"	Dominic Bianchi	Mark Hentemann	November 13, 2011	9ACX08	6.01
Brian and Stewie go back in time to January 31, 1999, the day the very first episode of the show aired, so the two could change history, but would have to go back again to change history a second time. While doing so, the current Brian tells himself about the 9/11 attacks, which causes trouble in the present.
171	6	"Thanksgiving"	Jerry Langford	Patrick Meighan	November 20, 2011	9ACX04	6.02
When Lois prepares a big Thanksgiving dinner, Kevin Swanson suddenly returns to Quahog to meet his family and friends, and the others originally thought that he presumably died in Iraq.
172	7	"Amish Guy"	John Holmquist	Mark Hentemann	November 27, 2011	8ACX22	5.50
While returning from a visit at Six Flags in Ohio, the Griffin’s car breaks down in Amish county in southern Pennsylvania where Meg falls for a local Amish boy named Eli, the family soon find themselves in a conflict led by Peter against the Amish.
173	8	"Cool Hand Peter"	Brian Iles	Artie Johann & Shawn Ries	December 4, 2011	9ACX05	7.14
Peter and his friends take a stand against their wives and flee to New Orleans on a road trip. On the way there, the group earn a one-way ticket to jail. But when they decide to make a run for it where both Joe's quick planning and Peter's seductive ways help them escape. Meanwhile, Lois spends some quality time with Donna and Bonnie as they engage in childish and foolish antics.
174	9	"Grumpy Old Man"	John Holmquist	Dave Ihlenfeld & David Wright	December 11, 2011	9ACX07	6.10
After Carter falls asleep while driving in a snowstorm, the family soon realize he is on the verge of retirement, concerned for his safety, Lois decides to admit him to a nursing home in Florida, in an attempt to help him adjust to life as an older man. Carter is reluctant to live in the retirement community, however, but eventually comes to enjoy the various activities. A few months later, he suddenly becomes grumpy and even more elderly, causing Peter to take him back to his old business and reverting him back to normal.
175	10	"Quagmire and Meg"	Joseph Lee	Tom Devanney	January 8, 2012	9ACX03	6.23
When Meg finally turns 18 years old on her birthday, Quagmire seizes the opportunity to pursue his next romantic conquest. As the new relationship starts to kick in, Peter stops at nothing to come in between Meg and Quagmire’s relationship, but Lois urges him to back off because she does not believe anything will happen.
176	11	"The Blind Side"	Bob Bowen	Cherry Chevapravatdumrong	January 15, 2012	9ACX06	8.31
Brian gets a blind girlfriend who dislikes dogs. Despite this, they build up a healthy relationship without her aware of his species and breed, but he still wants to meet her parents; Peter is introduced to a new co-worker at the brewery named Stella, whom Quagmire has his eyes on, Meanwhile, Peter deals with the new stairs after Stewie gets a splinter.
177	12	"Livin' on a Prayer"	Pete Michels	Danny Smith	January 29, 2012	9ACX09	5.92
When Stewie's new best friend, Scotty, falls ill, Lois takes him to the hospital where Dr. Hartman finds out that he has a case of Hodgkin's disease. However, Scotty’s parents refuse treatment due to their religious beliefs, leaving Lois to take risks to seek treatment for Scotty herself before it’s too late.
178	13	"Tom Tucker: The Man and His Dream"	Greg Colton	Alex Carter	February 12, 2012	9ACX10	5.03
When Peter decides to help Tom Tucker realize his dream to become a famous actor, he becomes his agent as they go to Hollywood. When they arrive to Hollywood, they come face to face with James Woods who is revealed to have been revived from his passing in the previous season’s premiere. Meanwhile, Chris dates a girl named Lindsey who looks completely identical to Lois. Note: This episode was dedicated to Ricky Garduno, one of the storyboard artist of the show.
179	14	"Be Careful What You Fish For"	Julius Wu	Steve Callaghan	February 19, 2012	9ACX11	5.47
When Peter and the guys try to salvage a sunken Mercedes-Benz, Peter encounters and promises a favor to a benign dolphin named Billy. Soon afterwards, Billy decides moves to Quahog but outstays his welcome at Peter's, after he realizes that Billy has become a nuisance in the house, he tries to reunite with him with his ex-wife in hopes that he will return to the ocean. Meanwhile, Stewie attends a pre-school with an incompetent but pretty teacher who Brian falls for.
180	15	"Burning Down the Bayit"	Jerry Langford	Chris Sheridan	March 4, 2012	9ACX13	5.33
Overwhelmed with financial problems and the lack of workers, Mort persuades both Peter and Quagmire to help him save his pharmacy from closure. However, things go south when the trio decide to burn it down to collect insurance money until the three get arrested for burning the pharmacy down.
181	16	"Killer Queen"	Joseph Lee	Spencer Porter	March 11, 2012	9ACX12	5.74
After Chris wins a hot dog eating contest, Lois becomes worried about his health and sends him and Peter to fat camp. At the camp however, the duo come face to face with a serial killer who terminates the obese campers, which coincides with Patrick Pewterschmidt, who has been released from a mental institution. Meanwhile, Stewie becomes frightened of the front cover of the Queen album “News of the World” that Brian showed him in the attic, which later leads to Brian telling Stewie that the robot isn’t real and is only an album cover, which coincidentally leads to Stewie making peace with the robot and becomes no longer frightened of the album cover.
182	17	"Forget-Me-Not"	Brian Iles	David A. Goodman	March 18, 2012	9ACX14	5.61
After an innocent night out, things go south when Peter, Joe, Brian, and Quagmire all wake up in a hospital and discover that their memories have been erased and Quahog has been deserted, making the four being the only ones remaining.
183	18	"You Can't Do That on Television, Peter"	Bob Bowen	Julius Sharpe	April 1, 2012	9ACX15	5.05
Peter develops and stars in a children's TV show after Stewie’s favorite show has been cancelled. Meanwhile, Meg begins an internship with Dr. Hartman at the local hospital.
184	19	"Mr. and Mrs. Stewie"	Joe Vaux	Gary Janetti	April 29, 2012	9ACX17	5.63
When Stewie befriends a girl on the playground named Penelope, he becomes surprised to hear that they both have a lot in common, saying that they both have plans for world domination. Meanwhile, Lois gets squashed in her sleep by Peter and suggests that they sleep in separate beds. Peter doesn't like the idea due to snuggling issues and decides to sleep with Quagmire.
185	20	"Leggo My Meg-O"	John Holmquist	Brian Scully	May 6, 2012	9ACX16	5.64
In a parody of Taken, Meg travels abroad to Europe, her adventure comes to a halt when she gets kidnapped, both Brian and Stewie embark on an mission to find her before it’s too late.
186	21	"Tea Peter"	Pete Michels	Patrick Meighan	May 13, 2012	9ACX18	4.94
After the city hall threatens to shut down Peter’s illegally run business, Peter joins the Tea Party and, with the help of Carter, who reaps the benefit of all the chaos in the town, successfully campaigns to shut down the government. However, this ordeal causes the city to break down without government.
187	22	"Family Guy Viewer Mail #2"	Greg Colton	Tom Devanney	May 20, 2012	9ACX19	5.35
187	22	"Family Guy Viewer Mail #2"	Greg Colton	Alec Sulkin	May 20, 2012	9ACX19	5.35
187	22	"Family Guy Viewer Mail #2"	Greg Colton	Deepak Sethi	May 20, 2012	9ACX19	5.35
Brian and Stewie respond to viewer mail. Chap of the Manor - We are introduced to a UK version of the Griffins. Fatman and Robin - Peter discovers that everything he touches turns into his favorite comedian, Robin Williams. Point of Stew - A first-person perspective with Stewie.
188	23	"Internal Affairs"	Julius Wu	Wellesley Wild	May 20, 2012	9ACX20	5.35
Peter and Quagmire encourage Joe to have a one-night stand with his attractive new partner named Nora, in order to even the score with Bonnie for her own indiscretions. But when Bonnie finds out and threatens to start a divorce, Lois insists that Peter get them back together. Meanwhile, Peter has an encounter with Ernie the Giant Chicken and makes up for another brawl.

== Marketing ==
To promote the show's tenth season, 20th Century Fox announced a sweepstakes. The sweepstakes reportedly would provide the winner with $3,000, as well as the announcement of the winner's name during the season 10 premiere. Fox celebrated the show's 10th anniversary with an event called the "Something Something Something Anniversary" in which Fox hosted theatrical screenings of 3 episodes each, across 10 cities in the United States.

== Reception ==
The season received mixed to negative reviews. Kevin McFarland of The A.V. Club gave a C rating for the season. Tucker Cummings of Yahoo! TV said "Despite a one-hour finale event that delivered a few laughs, 'Viewer Mail #2 / Internal Affairs' tread far too much familiar ground, a problem that's been plaguing the series for some time now." He continued, "There's a tipping point in TV sitcoms where the repeated use of a running joke stops being funny, and just seems lazy and uninspired. If the Viewer Mail concept had been done regularly, it might have seemed more like a tradition (like the Treehouse of Horror on "The Simpsons"). However, by re-using an episode idea from 2002, it seemed to viewers like the creative minds behind the show were lacking creativity. While some of the concepts were funny (the Griffins as British, life from Stewie's perspective), many jokes fell flat."

Review grades
#	Title	Air date	The A.V. Club (A-F)	TV Fanatic (5)	Ology (10)	Sources
1	"Lottery Fever"	September 25, 2011	C	3	6.5	
2	"Seahorse Seashell Party"	October 2, 2011	D+	3.2	4.5	
3	"Screams of Silence: The Story of Brenda Q"	October 30, 2011	C+	3.5	7	
4	"Stewie Goes for a Drive"	November 6, 2011	C-	4.5	7	
5	"Back to the Pilot"	November 13, 2011	A-	4.2	7.5	
6	"Thanksgiving"	November 20, 2011	C	3.5	9	
7	"Amish Guy"	November 27, 2011	B-	4	7.5	
8	"Cool Hand Peter"	December 4, 2011	C	4.5	6	
9	"Grumpy Old Man"	December 11, 2011	C+	3.8	5.5	
10	"Meg and Quagmire"	January 8, 2012	D	4.5	6.5	
11	"The Blind Side"	January 15, 2012	B+	3.5	7	
12	"Livin' on a Prayer"	January 29, 2012	B-	4.3	—N/a	
13	"Tom Tucker: The Man and His Dream"	February 12, 2012	B	—N/a	—N/a	
14	"Be Careful What You Fish For"	February 19, 2012	C-	—N/a	—N/a	
15	"Burning Down the Bayit"	March 4, 2012	C	—N/a	—N/a	
16	"Killer Queen"	March 11, 2012	B	—N/a	—N/a	
17	"Forget-Me-Not"	March 18, 2012	C+	—N/a	—N/a	
18	"You Can't Do That on Television, Peter"	April 1, 2012	D	—N/a	—N/a	
19	"Mr. and Mrs. Stewie"	April 29, 2012	B+	3	—N/a	
20	"Leggo My Meg-O"	May 6, 2012	B-	2.5	—N/a	
21	"Tea Peter"	May 13, 2012	C+	2.7	—N/a	
22	"Viewer Mail #2"	May 20, 2012	—N/a	3.3	—N/a	
22	"Chap of the Manor"	May 20, 2012	A-	—N/a	—N/a	
22	"Fatman and Robin"	May 20, 2012	C	—N/a	—N/a	
22	"Point of Stew"	May 20, 2012	B-	—N/a	—N/a	
23	"Internal Affairs"	May 20, 2012	B	1.5	—N/a	
Season			C	—N/a		
Average			C+	3.5	6.8	Average
