= Amish Guy =

- Family Guy episode
- Episode no.: Season 10; Episode 7
- Directed by: John Holmquist
- Written by: Mark Hentemann
- Production code: 8ACX22
- Original air date: November 27, 2011

Guest appearances
- Christine Lakin as Joyce Kinney; Ari Graynor as Woman; Bobby Lee as Chinese Man; Bailey Gambertoglio as Japanese Girl; Missi Pyle as Woman; Kevin Michael Richardson as Roadblock; John Viener as Ezekiel/Duke

Episode chronology
← Previous "Thanksgiving"	Next → "Cool Hand Peter"
- Family Guy season 10

"Amish Guy" is the seventh episode of the tenth season of the animated comedy series Family Guy, and the 172nd episode overall. It originally aired on the Fox network in the United States on November 27, 2011. The episode follows the Griffin family after their car breaks down in Amish country on their way back from a vacation. The family must then learn to adjust to the community for the weekend, until they are able to fix their car at a mechanic's. However, when Meg falls in love with an Amish boy named Eli, and his father forbids the two from ever seeing each other again, a Romeo and Juliet conflict arises between the two families. This results in a battle between the families, with the victor determining Meg and Eli's ultimate fate.

The episode was written by Mark Hentemann and directed by John Holmquist. It received mostly positive reviews from critics for its storyline and numerable cultural references. According to Nielsen ratings, it was viewed in 5.5 million homes in its original airing. The episode featured guest performances by Christine Lakin, Ari Graynor, Bobby Lee, Bailey Gambertoglio, Missi Pyle and Kevin Michael Richardson, along with several recurring guest voice actors for the series. It was first announced at the 2011 San Diego Comic-Con.

== Plot ==
The Griffin family decide to travel to the Six Flags amusement park. When Peter is barred from riding The League of Extraordinary Gentlemen-themed roller coasters because he is too overweight, he becomes disappointed. Peter's friends Joe and Quagmire then convince him to go on a diet in order to be able to ride the coaster. He is unable to lose any weight and decides to wear a girdle instead. The family then travels to Ohio in order to ride a new roller coaster called The Holocaust. This time Peter is allowed to ride the roller coaster, but it is unable to make it up the first hill, and collapses under his weight.

As the family begin driving home, the car suddenly breaks down in Amish country, with no mechanic or any signs of modern civilization in sight. The family approaches a group of Amish workers, asking if they can stay in the workers' village for the weekend. When Meg complains about the lack of electricity and other modern conveniences, a local Amish boy named Eli decides to take her on a tour of the village. The pair then begin to kiss, but the boy's overprotective, abusive, fanatical, and strict father Ezekiel interrupts them, and instructs the two never to see each other again over fears that Meg may corrupt his son. Upon hearing of this, Peter tries to talk to Ezekiel, but unintentionally turns the Amish community against him after trying to introduce Ezekiel to rock music with the song "Highway to Hell", prompting him to demand that the Griffin family leave, arranging for two horses to pull the car back to their home. Eli decides to follow Meg, and the group then returns to Quahog.

Later that day, the Amish follow the family to Quahog and vandalize the Griffins' home – painting "Ye Suck" and doing all of the outside chores – Furious, Peter declares war against the group. A battle ensues, with both sides equally matched. Peter and Ezekiel then have a fist fight in order to settle the matter on their own, but Eli stops his father and tells him that he is truly in love with Meg. Eli decides to stay in Amish country, and tells Meg that it is his true home. The two then embrace in one final hug. Peter and Ezekiel call a truce, deciding to remain friends and making plans to visit each other.

== Production and development ==
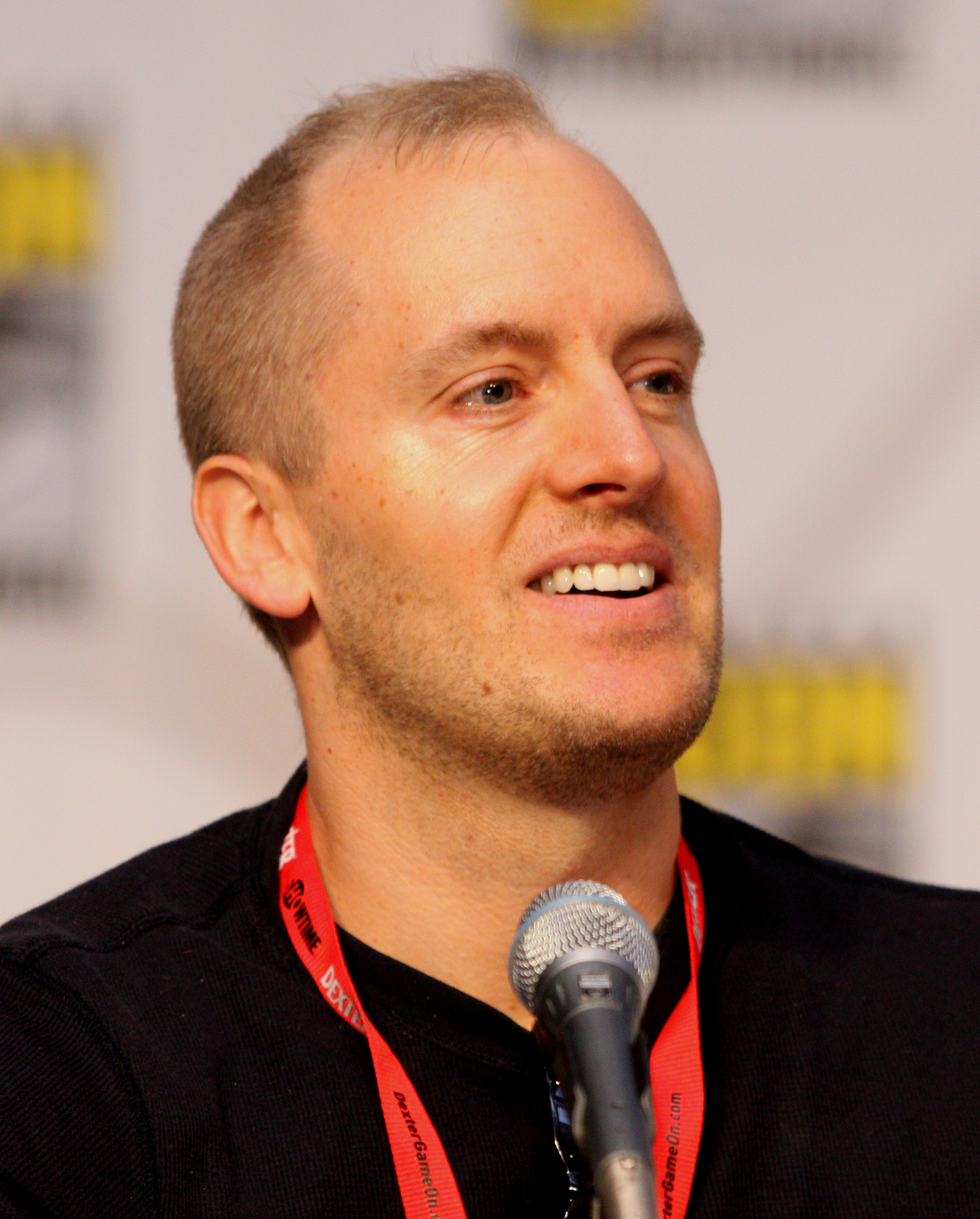
Mark Hentemann wrote the episode.

The episode was directed by series regular John Holmquist, shortly after the conclusion of the ninth production season, his first episode of the season. Holmquist joined the series in its second season, directing the episode "Running Mates". The episode was written by executive producer and showrunner Mark Hentemann, who joined the show as a writer in its third season, writing the episode "The Kiss Seen Around the World". This was also Hentemann's second episode of the season, after first writing the Brian and Stewie adventure episode "Back to the Pilot". Series regulars Peter Shin and James Purdum served as supervising directors, with Andrew Goldberg, Alex Carter, Spencer Porter, and Elaine Ko serving as staff writers for the episode. Composer Ron Jones, who has worked on the series since its inception, returned to compose the music for "Amish Guy". "Amish Guy" was first announced at the 2011 San Diego Comic-Con on July 23, 2011, by series showrunners and executive producers Steve Callaghan and Hentemann.

In addition to the regular cast, guest stars included actress Christine Lakin, actress Ari Graynor, actor and comedian Bobby Lee, singer and actress Missi Pyle, and voice actor Kevin Michael Richardson, who notably portrays Cleveland Brown, Jr. on Family Guy creator Seth MacFarlane's spin-off series The Cleveland Show. Recurring guest voice actors Alexandra Breckenridge, writer Chris Sheridan, writer Danny Smith, writer Alec Sulkin and writer John Viener made minor appearances throughout the episode.

The DVD release features an extended cut of a scene in the Drunken Clam, where Peter openly criticizes Garfield: His 9 Lives.

== Reception ==
"Amish Guy" was broadcast on November 27, 2011, as a part of an animated television night on Fox, and was preceded by The Simpsons and Allen Gregory, and followed by Family Guy creator and executive producer Seth MacFarlane's second show, American Dad!. It was watched by 5.50 million viewers, according to Nielsen ratings, despite airing simultaneously with the Hallmark Hall of Fame on ABC, The Amazing Race on CBS and Sunday Night Football on NBC. The episode also acquired a 2.8/6 rating in the 18–49 demographic, beating The Simpsons, Allen Gregory and American Dad!, in addition to significantly edging out Allen Gregory and American Dad! in total viewership. The episode's ratings decreased significantly from the previous week's episode, "Thanksgiving".

The episode received mostly positive reviews. Kevin McFarland of The A.V. Club wrote of the episode, "The main plot actually did quite a good job of mirroring the usual Simpsons trope of starting in one place, going to another, and then taking a left turn into the actual central plot of the episode." He also compared it to a comic strip, noting, "If I didn't think the funnies lived up to their nickname, I did what everyone does with a newspaper. I threw it away. [...] Then I read the strip again the next day, as if the previous one hadn't existed. That's how I tried to watch this episode, paying some attention to the Griffins in Amish country, but mostly isolating each joke setup, figuring out what I liked, and then moving on to the next one." He concluded his review of the episode by giving it a grade of B−. Terren R. Moore of Ology praised Peter's role in the episode, writing, "even though the arguments and evidence that this show is past its prime grow increasingly larger, Peter manages—for me, anyway—to still be hilarious in nearly everything he does as he becomes more and more outlandish in the various situations the show puts him in." He concluded his review, however, by stating, "for the most part, I arrive at the same point I do at the end of nearly every episode this season: there's just nothing new happening here." Moore gave the episode a rating of 7.5 out of ten.
