= Cool Hand Peter =

- Family Guy episode
- Episode no.: Season 10; Episode 8
- Directed by: Brian Iles
- Written by: Artie Johann and Shawn Ries
- Production code: 9ACX05
- Original air date: December 4, 2011

Guest appearances
- Bob Gunton as Warden; Sanaa Lathan as Donna Tubbs; Julius Sharpe as UPS Guy; Jennifer Tilly as Bonnie Swanson

Episode chronology
← Previous "Amish Guy"	Next → "Grumpy Old Man"
- Family Guy season 10

"Cool Hand Peter" is the eighth episode of the tenth season of the American animated sitcom Family Guy, and the 173rd episode overall. It originally aired on Fox in the United States on December 4, 2011. In the episode, Peter Griffin and his friends Joe, Quagmire and Cleveland (who has returned to Quahog) decide to go on a road trip to New Orleans, Louisiana. Whilst driving, they are stopped by a police officer, arrested and thrown in jail by the sheriff who abuses his power, and plants marijuana in their car. The friends then attempt to escape the prison due to their stay being extended indefinitely, and return to Quahog.

The episode served as a follow-up to the exit of the main character Cleveland Brown, who left Family Guy in order to star in his own Fox spin-off, entitled The Cleveland Show. Main cast member and former series writer Mike Henry returned to the series to provide the voice of Cleveland. The episode also featured a crossover between Family Guy and The Cleveland Show, both of which were created by executive producer Seth MacFarlane, and included cameo appearances by two of The Cleveland Show's main characters.

First announced at the 2011 San Diego Comic-Con, the episode was written by Artie Johann and Shawn Ries, and directed by Brian Iles. Critics praised the episode for its structure and humor, but also criticized it for not living up to the 1967 drama film Cool Hand Luke, which the episode was named after. According to Nielsen ratings, it was watched by 7.14 million people in its original airing. The episode featured guest performances by Ralph Garman, Bob Gunton, Sanaa Lathan, Julius Sharpe, and Jennifer Tilly along with several recurring guest voice actors from the series.

== Plot ==
When Cleveland Brown returns to Quahog for a week, he visits his old friends Peter, Joe and Quagmire. When Peter gets tired of his wife, Lois, constantly demanding for him to do chores, he and the rest of the group decide to take a road trip to New Orleans, Louisiana. Whilst their husbands are away, Lois, Bonnie and Donna proceed to enjoy "girl time", resulting with them doing wine-induced childish antics which include forcibly dressing Brian in a humiliating bumblebee costume.

While driving through a rural area in Georgia, Peter and his group are pulled over by the local sheriff, and Peter makes every effort to talk as annoyingly and rudely to him as possible. But the Sheriff is more offended by Cleveland's attempt to calmingly explain themselves, punching out their left headlights and then planting a bag of cannabis in their trunk. The group are then sent to a county work camp where they are forced to perform various tasks, including ditch digging and rock crushing. As their stay in the jail supposedly comes to an end, the warden then approaches them and tells them that their stay has been extended an additional thirty days. Learning from another prisoner that they might be locked up forever, the group decides to break out of the prison. Joe deliberately falls out of his wheelchair as a distraction and the gang escapes. Successful in their attempt, they soon come across a house where they discover a set of handcuff and shackle keys.

They then discover that they are in the sheriff's home, who returns soon after. Peter tries to pretend to be his wife while hiding in a closet, and he convinces the sheriff to let the fugitives go free. This exchange ends with the sheriff asking for a hug, which makes Peter jump out of the closet and reveal the group, making the sheriff realize that he doesn't have a wife. The entire police force then comes after them, until they are able to jump on a train and arrive in Quahog, only to be met by the sheriff and his deputies. Joe, however, had called ahead and arranged for the Quahog police department to arrive and rescue them. Joe then wrecks the sheriff's car and shoots him in the kneecap before chastising him for his corrupt actions as a law enforcement officer, demanding he leave Quahog. As the Georgia police force drive away, Joe remarks he is grateful to be in the north, "where people are civilized", only for he and the others to be insulted by Mayor West as he passes by on a bicycle immediately afterwards.

== Production and development ==
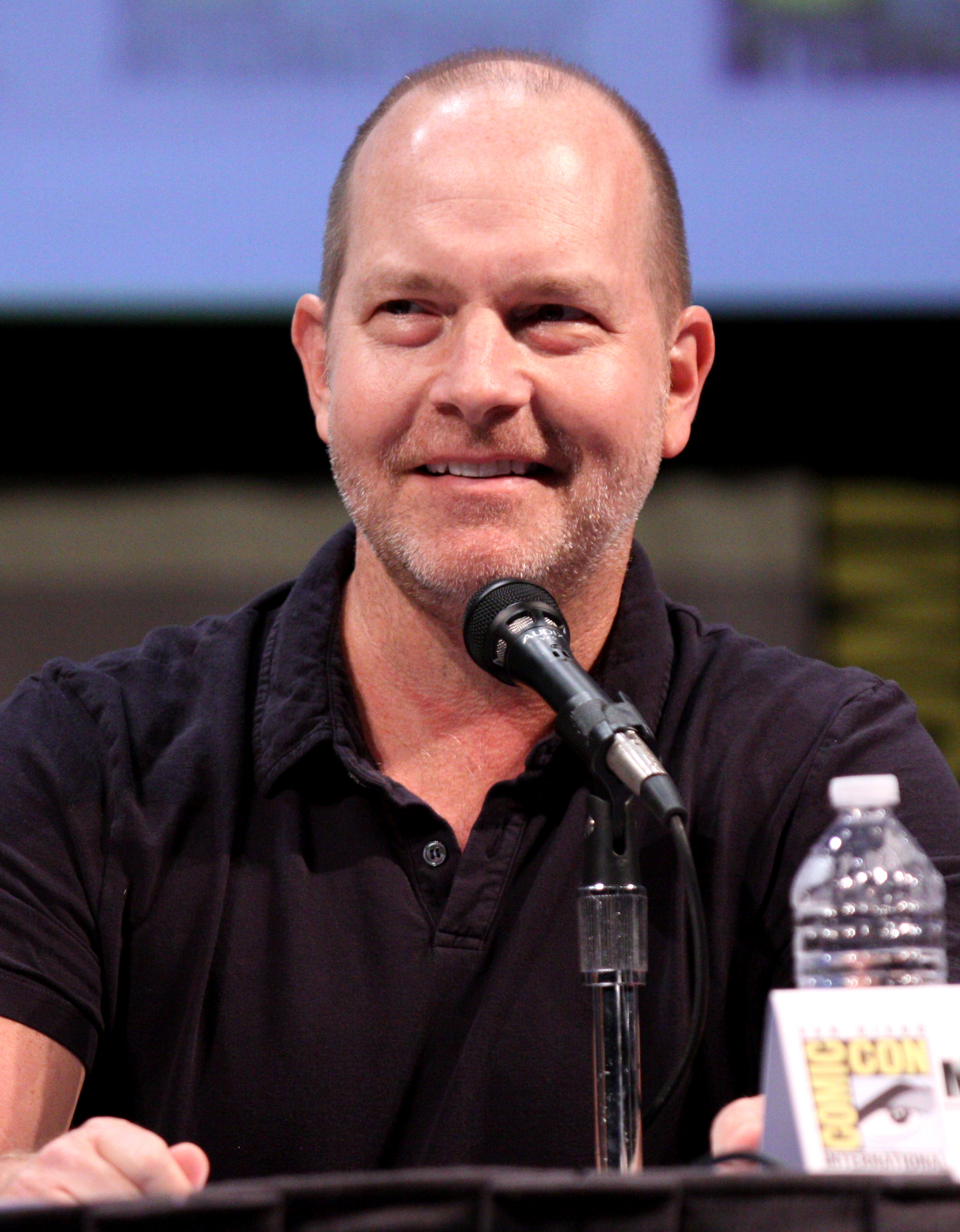
Mike Henry returned as Cleveland in the episode.

The episode was directed by series regular Brian Iles and written by Artie Johann and Shawn Ries, in their first episode of the series. Series regulars Peter Shin and James Purdum served as supervising directors, with Andrew Goldberg, Alex Carter, Spencer Porter, Anthony Blasucci, Mike Desilets, and Deepak Sethi serving as staff writers for the episode. Composer Walter Murphy, who has worked on the series since its inception, returned to compose the music for the episode. The episode saw the re-appearance of former main cast member Mike Henry as the voice of Cleveland Brown. The actor had previously left the role on Family Guy, in order to star as the character in his own spinoff, entitled The Cleveland Show, which was co-created by Henry. Sanaa Lathan, who portrays Donna Tubbs on The Cleveland Show, also guest starred as her character in the episode. "Cool Hand Peter" was first announced at the 2011 San Diego Comic-Con on July 23, 2011 by series showrunners and executive producers Steve Callaghan and Mark Hentemann.

In addition to the regular cast and Lathan, actor Bob Gunton, voice actor Julius Sharpe, and actress Jennifer Tilly, who portrayed the sheriff, warden, UPS Guy and Bonnie Swanson, respectively, guest starred in the episode. Recurring guest voice actors Danny Smith, writer Alec Sulkin, voice actor Ralph Garman, and writer John Viener made minor appearances throughout the episode. Recurring cast members Adam West, and Patrick Warburton also appeared in the episode, portraying the characters of Adam West and Joe Swanson, respectively. Bob Gunton's voicing of the warden is probably a nod to his most famous role, that of the warden in the film The Shawshank Redemption.

== Cultural references ==
The title of the episode is a reference to the 1967 American film Cool Hand Luke. In the opening scene of the episode, while Peter, Joe, Cleveland and Quagmire are drinking at the local bar, Peter's wife, Lois, calls him on his phone. The theme song from The Cleveland Show then begins playing as Peter's ringtone. While the group drives to New Orleans, they attempt to pass the time by playing various games in the car. One of the games involves deciding whether to be a "hobo," or former German Nazi leader Adolf Hitler. After the group is pulled over by the sheriff, and arrested for drug possession, they are all taken to court, where the jury is revealed to be various characters from the Fox animation series The Simpsons. Peter and Joe then debated over whether the Simpson jurors were actually a jury of their peers. The warden of the prison resembles the warden in the movie The Shawshank Redemption, who is also authoritarian and cruel. In fact, the voice of the warden is the voice of Bob Gunton, the actor who portrayed the warden in the film. After the group escapes from jail, Peter remarks that he is filled with hunger, and would like to stop at a "Burger Queen" or "McDaniels" along the way back to Quahog, a reference to the American fast food restaurants Burger King and McDonald's, as indicated by Quagmire. who expresses his disdain that they are "on television".

== Reception ==
"Cool Hand Peter" was originally broadcast on Fox in the United States on December 4, 2011. It was watched by 7.14 million viewers, according to Nielsen ratings, despite airing simultaneously with the Desperate Housewives on ABC, The Good Wife on CBS and Sunday Night Football on NBC. The episode also acquired a 3.6/8 rating in the 18–49 demographic, beating Allen Gregory and The Cleveland Show, in addition to significantly edging out both shows in total viewership. The episode's ratings increased significantly from the previous week's episode, "Amish Guy".

The episode received mixed reviews, with Kevin McFarland of The A.V. Club calling the storyline "disappointing." He wrote of the episode, "At this juncture, disappointment is an expectation, something I have to fight against whenever I sit down to watch the show in an attempt to give each episode a fair shake." He continued, "This week, I was at a bit of a loss, because despite a return to an older, more successful formula, with a clearly plotted path, Family Guy didn't muster up enough material to fill out the A-plot of a half hour." McFarland also stated that the episode did not live up to the 1967 drama film Cool Hand Luke, that the title of the episode was named after. He concluded his review of the episode by giving the episode a grade of C. Terren R. Moore of Ology also found the episode to be unimpressive, noting, "It's good fun while it's on, but nothing here really sticks or adds to anything new to love about Family Guy." Moore also commented, "it's a pretty weak episode of Family Guy, where the most memorable joke of the night involves a thought bubble where Quagmire pulls a string of beads out of a woman's vagina." In the conclusion of the review, Moore gave the episode a 6/10 score.
