= Back to the Pilot =

- Family Guy episode
- Stewie unintentionally runs into his old self.
- Episode no.: Season 10; Episode 5
- Directed by: Dominic Bianchi; Peter Shin (pilot)
- Written by: Mark Hentemann; Seth MacFarlane (pilot)
- Production code: 9ACX08
- Original air date: November 13, 2011

Guest appearances
- Lacey Chabert as Meg in pilot; Chris Cox as George W. Bush; Ralph Garman as Dog in the Window; Christine Lakin as Joyce Kinney; Phil LaMarr as Judge in pilot; Fred Tatasciore as John Madden in pilot

Episode chronology
← Previous "Stewie Goes for a Drive"	Next → "Thanksgiving"
- Family Guy season 10

"Back to the Pilot" is the 5th episode of the 10th season of the animated comedy series Family Guy, and the 170th episode overall. It originally aired on Fox in the United States on November 13, 2011. In "Back to the Pilot", two of the show's main characters, Stewie and Brian, both voiced by series creator Seth MacFarlane, use a time machine to travel back in time to the first episode of the series, "Death Has a Shadow". Trouble ensues, however, when Brian tells his former self about the September 11 attacks, causing the present to be dramatically changed, and ultimately resulting in an apocalyptic second American Civil War. The two must then prevent themselves from travelling back in time in the first place, but soon realize that it will be much more difficult than they had originally thought.

The episode was written by Mark Hentemann and directed by Dominic Bianchi. It received high praise from critics for its storyline and many cultural references, in addition to receiving some criticism for its portrayal of the September 11 attacks, an example of 9/11 humor despite being self-aware. According to Nielsen ratings, it was viewed by 6.01 million people in its original airing. The episode featured guest performances by Lacey Chabert, Chris Cox, Ralph Garman, Christine Lakin, Phil LaMarr and Fred Tatasciore, along with several recurring guest voice actors for the series.

== Plot ==
In 2011, Brian asks Stewie to help him find a tennis ball he had buried on January 31, 1999 (the day of the series premiere on Fox). Using Stewie's time machine to travel back to that date, the two come upon the Griffin family in 1999, with the original Film Roman-styled designs and animation, but the two notices that their past looks more strange than they remembered it: the family continually pauses for cutaways, and Meg's voice sounds different. Stewie also points out that this may be his first memory, and that is the day Peter's eye overlapped with his nose (an animation error that actually occurred in the pilot).

Warning Brian not to alter the past by getting the tennis ball and advising him to instead memorize its location, Stewie goes into his room to set up their return to the present, when 1999 Stewie suddenly enters. The two Stewies then meet, and 2011 Stewie tells 2011 Brian to come out from his hiding place after explaining himself to 1999 Stewie. However, hanging outside the window, Brian falls onto 1999 Peter's car as he drives to the stag party at 1999 Glenn Quagmire's house. Stewie finds Brian and the two then attempt to return to the present, but find that the return pad's batteries (having converted it to take D batteries instead of uranium after their trouble in Germany) are running low, and move only a bit forward in time to Super Bowl XXXIII. The two manage to take advantage of 1999 Peter dumping his welfare money out of a blimp above the stadium to collect the money needed to purchase new batteries before nearly being crushed by the blimp after it is shot down and start making their way back, but only after briefly landing at 1999 Peter's trial and making the 1999 Kool-Aid Man miss his cue for breaking into the courtroom, causing him to break into pieces.

After the two return to 2011, Stewie discovers that Brian intentionally warned his past self about the September 11 attacks ahead of time, allowing 2001 Brian to go on American Airlines Flight 11, beat hijackers Mohamed Atta and Abdulaziz al-Omari with a baseball bat, and request air traffic controllers to have all flights departing from the East Coast, including the other three hijacked planes, to be grounded. While watching the local news, it is also discovered that former President George W. Bush, who lost the 2004 presidential election to John Kerry due to being unable to exploit people's fears without 9/11, has returned to Texas and reformed the Confederate States of America, starting a second American Civil War. Brian insists that things will still be better in the end, but when they travel into 2016, they find a computer generated post-apocalyptic future. To Brian's horror, the Civil War has resulted in nuclear attacks across the Eastern Seaboard that have caused the deaths of over 17 million people (including Cesar Millan whom Brian apparently loved). Additionally, the show's humor has become dull (for instance, Peter enters the room with a roll of double-sided tape which he claims he will utilize for 7 minutes before an episode’s story focuses on Meg in a kissing booth, and abruptly announces a cutaway which just consists of him standing in a white void and proclaiming his dislike of Matthew McConaughey), Cleveland Brown has moved back to Quahog (probably due to Stoolbend being in Confederated Virginia), and Joe Swanson is a cyborg who kills Quagmire – now a mutant humanoid frog named "Frogmire" – for violating curfew.

The pair return to 1999 and prevent Brian and Stewie from telling their past selves about the attacks. They return to the present in which 9/11 occurs, but Stewie discovers that Brian instead advised his past self to take false and undeserved credit for the Harry Potter novels. Seeing that Brian has learned nothing, Stewie takes him back to 1999 again to try to prevent their past selves from telling any future events. However, this results in 50 incarnations of Stewie and Brian appearing to prevent them from telling the future, including a Brian and Stewie accompanied by their Peter, a Stewie who has developed female breasts, another Stewie and Brian trapped in barber's poles, one Brian and Stewie dressed up in banana outfits, and a Brian whose throat was slit.

Having had enough, the first Stewie tells all of his and Brian's numerous future selves to take a vote on whether or not they should prevent 9/11, which results in the majority saying no, although Peter votes twice. The first Stewie then orders everyone to not foretell any future events and return to their respective times, which they do. From there, Stewie takes Brian back a minute before their past selves initially arrived, and forces them at gunpoint to return to 2011. After initial confusion results in the Brian that just arrived getting shot in the leg, they comply. With that, the altered timeline ceases to exist, along with its corresponding Stewie and Brian. Back in the present, the other Stewie and Brian, who is recovering from the leg injury, talk about the possibility of causing havoc during every time travel trip. They are thankful for not altering the present timeline until Peter arrives with his friends' 1999 selves to drink beer and watch TV.

== Production and development ==
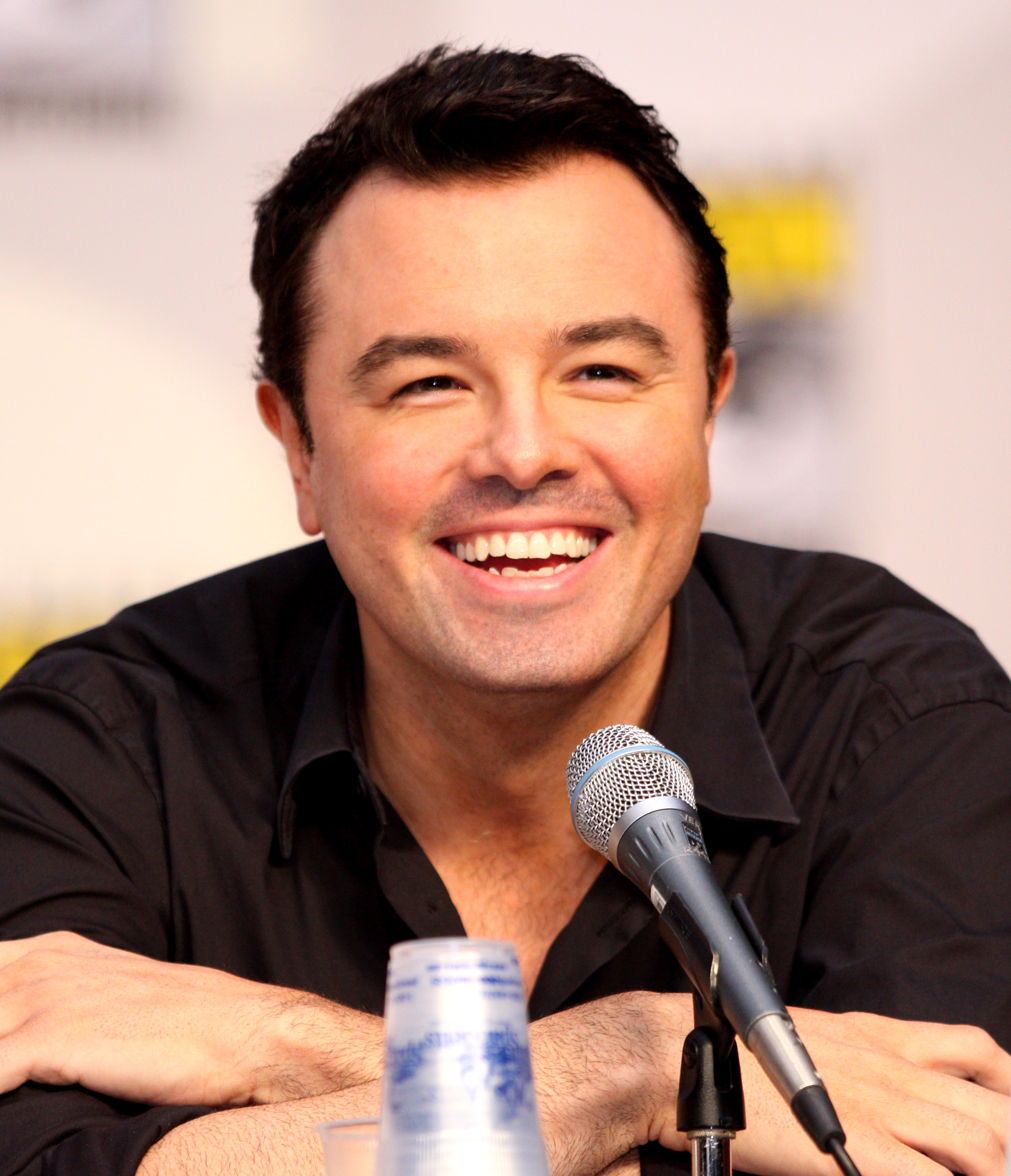
Seth MacFarlane first announced the episode at the 2011 San Diego Comic-Con.

Series creator and executive producer Seth MacFarlane first announced the episode at the 2011 San Diego Comic-Con in San Diego, California on July 23, 2011. MacFarlane notes in the DVD featurette that the episode was inspired by the Star Trek: Deep Space Nine episode "Trials and Tribble-ations". It was directed by series regular Dominic Bianchi, in his second episode of the season. Bianchi also previously served as director for the series's landmark 150th episode "Brian & Stewie". The episode was written by series showrunner and executive producer Mark Hentemann, who joined the show as a writer in its third season. Series regulars Peter Shin and James Purdum served as supervising directors, with Andrew Goldberg and Alex Carter serving as executive story editors, and Spencer Porter, Anthony Blasucci, Mike Desilets, and Deepak Sethi serving as staff writers for the episode. Composer Ron Jones, who has worked on the series since its inception, returned to compose the music for "Back to the Pilot". The episode was originally intended to be the seventh installation in the series's hallmark Road to... episodes, but it was changed before airing. The episode featured several examples of the old animation style that was used in the show's pilot episode, with the Griffin family all appearing in the lesser quality animation style in the past universe that Stewie and Brian travel to.

In addition to the regular cast, voice actor Chris Cox, actor Ralph Garman, and actress Christine Lakin guest starred in the episode. Archival recordings of actress Lacey Chabert, and voice actors Phil LaMarr and Fred Tatasciore from "Death Has a Shadow" were used, although they still received credit. Recurring guest voice actors Patrick Warburton and writer John Viener made minor appearances throughout the episode. Chabert's role in the episode was that of Meg Griffin in the pilot episode. Chabert had previously voiced Meg, before eventually being replaced by actress Mila Kunis, who had a role on the television series That '70s Show during Family Guy's first season. Chabert left the series after completing the first production of episodes in order to focus on her schoolwork, as well as her participation in the television series Party of Five, with Kunis taking over the role after the first season.

== Reception ==
"Back to the Pilot" was broadcast on November 13, 2011, as a part of an animated television night on Fox, preceded by The Simpsons and Allen Gregory and followed by Family Guy MacFarlane's second show, American Dad!. It was watched by 6.01 million viewers, according to Nielsen ratings, despite airing simultaneously with Desperate Housewives on ABC, The Good Wife on CBS and Sunday Night Football on NBC. The episode also acquired a 3.1/7 rating in the 18–49 demographic, beating Allen Gregory and American Dad!, in addition to significantly edging out both shows in total viewership. The episode's ratings increased by nearly 200,000 viewers from the previous week's episode, "Stewie Goes for a Drive".

Reviews of the episode by television critics were positive, with Kevin McFarland of The A.V. Club calling it "an episode of Family Guy that rewards every viewer who liked the show in the past." McFarland also gave high praise to the episode, writing, "At first, I was simply pleased that 'Back to the Pilot' didn't screw things up at the beginning, but as the episode went, I kept looking at the clock and being amazed that it hadn't dropped the ball yet. It used short cutaways and a plethora of self-referential jokes the writers must have stockpiled for years about the animation quality, voice quality, and structure of the pilot to every possible advantage." He continued, "It wasn't perfect by any stretch of the imagination, and it's not on the same level as the occasional brilliance that South Park reaches on about one occasion per season nowadays, but it's the most fun I've had watching the show that didn't involve a Star Wars parody in many years." McFarland concluded his review by giving the episode a grade of A−. Kate Moon of TV Fanatic also enjoyed the episode, noting, "'Back to the Pilot' was a great meta episode of Family Guy. From poking fun at its own flaws in the original series to acknowledging how silly the cutaway gags can be, Family Guy shone at its layered best tonight." She continued, "Treating its animated characters like real actors was a nice touch as well. Watching the original family showed how much the characters evolved and changed throughout the series' long run." Moon concluded her review by giving the episode a 4.2 out of 5. Tom Eames of entertainment website Digital Spy placed the episode at number two on his listing of the best Family Guy episodes in order of "yukyukyuks" and described the episode as "pure genius". He added, "Not only was the episode hilarious with amazing Brian and Stewie moments, but it was genuinely quite clever in the time-travel stakes, which is impressive on a nerd level."

The episode was also the subject of criticism for its portrayal of the September 11 attacks, in which Brian and Stewie go back in time to make the attacks happen again, ultimately resulting in a high five when they are successful (despite Stewie immediately remarking that would sound terrible out of context). Terri Pous of Time wrote of the episode, "It sounds custom-made for a 'too soon' label, and it probably is. But avid Family Guy viewers live for 'too soon' moments, no matter how sensitive the material." Other news organizations, including Aly Semigran of Entertainment Weekly, also thought the show had gone too far with the reference. Nellie Andreeva of Deadline also commented that it "squeaked past the Fox standards and practices department but is sure to raise as many eyebrows." MacFarlane was scheduled to be on one of the planes that hit the Twin Towers but overslept allegedly due to being hungover.

== See also ==
- 2011 in American television
- 11/22/63, Stephen King novel (later adapted into a miniseries), in which a successful attempt to travel back in time and prevent the assassination of John F. Kennedy also adversely affects the future.
