= Linda Porter (actress) =

American actress (1933–2019)

- Born: January 31, 1933; Cleveland, Ohio, U.S.
- Died: September 25, 2019 (aged 86)
- Occupation: Actress
- Years active: 1988–2019

Linda Porter (January 31, 1933 – September 25, 2019) was an American actress. She appeared in numerous feature films, television programs, advertisements and music videos—most prominently in the series Superstore, Twins and the film Dude, Where's My Car?. She died of cancer on September 25, 2019.

== Selected filmography ==
- Beauty and the Beast (1988, TV series) as Elizabeth
- Who Gets the Friends? (1988, TV movie) as Manya
- Baby M (1988, TV Mini-series) as Dr. Einwohner
- Twins (1988) as Painter
- Murder, She Wrote (1992, TV series) as Clerk
- Frasier (1994, TV series) as Mary
- Roseanne (1995, TV series short) as Bev's Friend
- Mad About You (1995, TV series) as Mark's Grateful Patient
- The Truth About Cats & Dogs (1996) as Newscast Auditioner
- Hang Time (1996, TV series) as Martha
- Wings (1996, TV series) as Little Old Lady
- Becoming Rebecca (1996) as Ella
- The Naked Truth (1997, TV series) as Edwina
- ER (1998, TV series) as Inga Paulson
- The X-Files (1998, TV series) as Elderly Woman
- Tumbleweeds (1999) as Mrs. Boman
- Melrose Place (1999, TV series) as Nun
- G vs E (1999, TV series) as Mother Character
- The Mating Habits of the Earthbound Human (1999) as The Wise Old Woman
- Get Real (1999, TV series) as Office Assistant
- The Phantom Eye (1999, TV series) as Old Woman
- Diagnosis: Murder (2000, TV series) as Miss Winkle
- Stanley's Gig (2000) as Alice
- Partners (2000, TV movie) as Older Woman
- Even Stevens (2000, TV series) as Lady in the Street
- Dharma & Greg (2000, TV series) as Becky
- Judging Amy (2000, TV series) as Ms. Duncan
- When Billie Beat Bobby (2001, TV movie) as Old Woman
- Malcolm in the Middle (2001, TV series) as Audrey
- Dude, Where's My Car? (2000) as Mrs. Crabbleman
- Gilmore Girls (2001–2003, TV series) as Fran Weston
- Girlfriends (2003, TV series) as Mrs. Nussbaum
- Strong Medicine (2003, TV series)
- Duplex (2003) as Old Biddy #2
- Boomtown (2003, TV series) as Shirley Donadoni
- Phil of the Future (2004, TV series) as Grandma Berwick
- What I Like About You (2004, TV series) as Old Woman
- Scrubs (2004, TV series) as Old Woman
- Committed (2005, TV series) as Woman in Elevator
- The King of Queens (2005, TV series) as Eloise
- Out of Practice (2005, TV series) as Doris
- Queen of Cactus Cove (2005, short) as Mrs. Wadsworth
- That's So Raven (2006, TV series) as Gertie Grossman
- My Name Is Earl (2008, TV series) as Doris Johannssen
- Uncross the Stars (2008) as Phyllis
- CSI: NY (2010, TV series) as Mary Riesling
- How I Met Your Mother (2010, Episode: "Home Wreckers") as Muriel
- The Suite Life on Deck (2011, TV series) as Grammy Picket
- American Horror Story: Murder House (2011, TV series) as Mary, Violet's Grandmother
- The Middle (2012, TV series) as Grandma Dot
- The Mindy Project (2012, TV series) as Grandma Putch
- Bunheads (2013, TV series) as Mrs. Weidemeyer
- 2 Broke Girls (2013, TV series) as Grace
- Mercy (2014) as Henrietta
- Togetherness (2015, TV series) as Elderly Reporter
- Pee-wee's Big Holiday (2016) as Mrs. Rose
- Superstore (2016–2019, TV series) as Myrtle Vartanian (recurring role) (final appearance)
- The House (2017) as Old Lady
- Twin Peaks (2017, TV series) as Lady Slot-Addict

== Other appearances ==
Porter appeared as the sample lady in a series of Nature Valley Cereal television commercials, which aired in the United States. She also played the part of the demonic old lady at the end of the Tenacious D music video "Tribute".
