= Family Guy season 11 =

Family Guy
- Season 11
- DVD cover
- Showrunners: Steve Callaghan; Alec Sulkin
- Starring: Seth MacFarlane; Alex Borstein; Seth Green; Mila Kunis; Mike Henry
- No. of episodes: 22

Release
- Original network: Fox
- Original release: September 30, 2012 – May 19, 2013

Season chronology
- ← Previous; Season 10 Next → Season 12

The eleventh season of the animated comedy series Family Guy aired on Fox from September 30, 2012, to May 19, 2013. The season consisted of 22 episodes.

The series follows the Griffin family, a dysfunctional family consisting of father Peter, mother Lois, daughter Meg, son Chris, baby Stewie, and the family dog Brian, who reside in their hometown of Quahog. The executive producers for the tenth production season are Seth MacFarlane, Richard Appel, Chris Sheridan, Danny Smith, Mark Hentemann, Steve Callaghan, Alec Sulkin, and Wellesley Wild. The showrunners are Callaghan and Sulkin, with Sulkin replacing previous showrunner Hentemann.

Guest voices for this season include J. J. Abrams, Mark Burnett, Dick Wolf, Jon Hamm, Elizabeth Banks, Sandra Bernhard, Dan Castellaneta, Anne Murray, Christina Milian, Lacey Chabert, and Johnny Depp.

== Background ==
In this season, the Griffins decide to climb Mount Everest ("Into Fat Air"); Lois has a mid-life crisis ("Lois Comes Out of Her Shell"); Meg falls for a boy who turns out to like her brother Chris ("Friends Without Benefits"); and Brian and Stewie leap into action after they discover the company owned by Lois's dad, Carter Pewterschmidt, has found the cure for cancer ("The Old Man and the Big 'C'"). This season also featured the 200th episode of the series.

Further episode plots were revealed at Comic-Con 2012. Quagmire accidentally marries a hooker ("The Giggity Wife"), on episode 21, Peter becomes a meth dealer ("Farmer Guy"), and Chris moves in with Herbert ("Chris Cross"). Also, Brian and Stewie travel to Vegas by teleportation, but instead the device malfunctions and ends up cloning them, where two pairs of Brian and Stewie both go on a road trip to Vegas, with each pair having different experiences, in another '"Road to ..."' episode as part of the season finale ("Roads to Vegas").

A Valentine's Day episode, aired on February 10, 2013, in which Stewie rounds up all of Brian's ex-girlfriends, who take delight in pointing out Brian's flaws ("Valentine's Day in Quahog").

The episode "Jesus, Mary and Joseph!" was scheduled to air on December 16, 2012, but was replaced by a repeat of "Grumpy Old Man" out of sensitivity for the Sandy Hook Elementary School shooting. The episode aired the following week on December 23, 2012.

It was the last season to air while the show's owner 20th Century Fox was still part of News Corporation, as on June 28, 2013, various entertainment assets of News Corporation were spun off into a new company called 21st Century Fox, with News Corporation retaining its print assets and Australian media assets.

On July 21, 2013, the season started on BBC Three in the UK.

== Voice cast and characters ==
- Seth MacFarlane as Peter Griffin, Brian Griffin, Stewie Griffin, Glenn Quagmire, Tom Tucker, Carter Pewterschmidt, Dr. Hartman, Seamus, Stan Smith, Roger Smith
- Alex Borstein as Lois Griffin
- Seth Green as Chris Griffin
- Mila Kunis as Meg Griffin
- Mike Henry as John Herbert, Bruce, Consuela

=== Supporting characters ===
- H. Jon Benjamin as Carl
- Johnny Brennan as Mort Goldman, Horace
- Gary Cole as Principal Shepherd
- Julie Hagerty as Carol Pewterschmidt-West
- Christine Lakin as Joyce Kinney
- Martha MacIsaac as Patty
- Natasha Melnick as Ruth
- Christina Milian as Esther
- Kevin Michael Richardson as Jerome
- Jennifer Tilly as Bonnie Swanson
- Patrick Warburton as Joe Swanson
- Adam West as Mayor Adam West

=== Guest Star Characters ===
- Dan Castellaneta as Homer Simpson
- Wendy Schaal as Francine Smith
- Rachael MacFarlane as Hayley Smith
- Scott Grimes as Steve Smith
- Dee Bradley Baker as Klaus

== Episodes ==
No. overall	No. in season	Title	Directed by	Written by	Original release date	Prod. code	U.S. viewers (millions)
189	1	"Into Fat Air"	Joseph Lee	Alec Sulkin	September 30, 2012	9ACX21	6.55
After the Griffins get competitive again with the family of Lois' ex, Ross Fishman, they resolve to climb Mount Everest at the same time as the Fishmans. Unfortunately, the Fishmans win the competition but when a storm engulfs the mountain, the Fishmans' son, Ben, freezes to death. In order to survive, the Griffins decide eat Ben's corpse before rescuing the Fishmans who are still looking for him.
190	2	"Ratings Guy"	James Purdum	Dave Ihlenfeld & David Wright	October 7, 2012	AACX01	6.70
When the Griffins become a member of the Nielsen Family, Peter decides to rig the ratings. When an angry mob let him know that he has crossed a line with his absurd changes, Peter must find a way to restore television back to normal. Note: This episode was dedicated to Phyllis Diller and Michael Clarke Duncan.
191	3	"The Old Man and the Big 'C'"	Brian Iles	Mike Desilets & Anthony Blasucci	November 4, 2012 (Note: This episode was originally scheduled to air on October 21, 2012, but was preempted as a result of a rainout of 2012 National League Championship Series Game 6.)	9ACX22	5.11
When Brian discovers that Carter’s pharmaceutical company is withholding the cure for cancer from the public in order to gain more profit, he and Stewie plot to expose the big secret that could change the world. Meanwhile, Quagmire accidentally loses his toupée going for a fly ball at a Red Sox game and it is put up on the scoreboard and YouTube, so he decides to ditch the wig.
192	4	"Yug Ylimaf"	John Holmquist	Mark Hentemann	November 11, 2012	AACX04	5.57
When Brian accidentally reverses the direction of time on Stewie’s time machine, the duo find a way to reset the direction of time before Stewie is "unborn."
193	5	"Joe's Revenge"	Bob Bowen	Julius Sharpe	November 18, 2012	AACX03	5.14
When Joe’s former enemy, Bobby Briggs becomes a fugitive, Quagmire, Joe, and Peter team up to hunt Bobby down before it’s too late.
194	6	"Lois Comes Out of Her Shell"	Joe Vaux	Danny Smith	November 25, 2012	AACX05	5.77
When Lois goes through a midlife crisis, her ripe 20-year-old behavior stresses Peter out. Meanwhile, Stewie finds and adopts a turtle in the park and names him Sheldon, but when the turtle turns out to be evil, Stewie must get rid of him once and for all.
195	7	"Friends Without Benefits"	Jerry Langford	Cherry Chevapravatdumrong	December 9, 2012	AACX02	5.64
When Meg learns that her crush Kent is gay, she decides that having Chris sleep with Kent is the next best thing to her having Kent for herself, but when Chris refuses, she plans to drug him and have Kent have sex with him while he is asleep.
196	8	"Jesus, Mary and Joseph!"	Julius Wu	Tom Devanney	December 23, 2012 (Note: This episode was originally scheduled to air on December 16, 2012, but was pulled from its planned airing as a result of the Sandy Hook Elementary School shooting that occurred two days prior.)	AACX07	5.49
As the Griffin family prepare for Christmas, Peter tells his own version of the Nativity story.
197	9	"Space Cadet"	Pete Michels	Alex Carter	January 6, 2013	AACX06	7.21
After Chris gets sent to space camp, he realizes that it is more than he can handle and asks to come home. But while the Griffins are there to get him, they look inside a rocket and Stewie launches them into space, and it’s up to Chris to bring his family and himself back to earth.
198	10	"Brian's Play"	Joseph Lee	Gary Janetti	January 13, 2013	AACX08	6.01
Brian writes a play that becomes a big success in Quahog but grows jealous when he finds that the play Stewie wrote is better than his, causing an argument.
199	11	"The Giggity Wife"	Brian Iles	Andrew Goldberg	January 27, 2013	AACX09	5.63
Quagmire accidentally marries a washed up prostitute named Charmese during a drunken visit to Harvard University in Massachusetts with Peter and Joe. He knows the only way for him to get a divorce is to prove to Charmese that he is homosexual, so he asks Peter for help in escaping the marriage.
200	12	"Valentine's Day in Quahog"	Bob Bowen	Daniel Palladino	February 10, 2013	AACX11	4.71
To engage in romance for Valentine's Day, Peter and Lois decide to spend the day in bed. Meanwhile, Stewie travels back in time to the '60's and "visits" a small girl who turns out to be his infant mother to his dismay; Meg learns a secret about the boy she met online; Quagmire learns to treat women with respect; Chris grows a crush on Herbert's niece; Consuela crosses the border to reunite with her husband; Brian is visited by his ex-girlfriends; and Mayor West saves Carol from making another love mistake.
201	13	"Chris Cross"	Jerry Langford	Anthony Blasucci & Mike Desilets	February 17, 2013	AACX10	4.87
Unable to buy new sneakers, Chris decides to purloin money from Lois's purse, but is caught by Meg, who blackmails him into doing her chores. After he gets fed up, Chris takes off to live with Herbert, but when he pushes things too far by making a mess and refusing to get ready for a night out, Herbert expels him from his house. Meanwhile, Stewie and Brian become obsessed with Canadian singer Anne Murray.
202	14	"Call Girl"	John Holmquist	Wellesley Wild	March 10, 2013	AACX12	5.27
When Peter loses everything in a lawsuit, Lois decides to get a job working on a phone sex line, and ends up with Peter as a client.
203	15	"Turban Cowboy"	Joe Vaux	Artie Johann & Shawn Ries	March 17, 2013	AACX13	4.92
After a skydiving accident, Peter befriends a Muslim man named Mahmoud, who convinces Peter to convert to Islam, only to reveal himself to Peter that he is a radical terrorist, leaving Joe and Quagmire with suspicions about Mahmoud.
204	16	"12 and a Half Angry Men"	Pete Michels	Ted Jessup	March 24, 2013	AACX14	5.16
In a parody of the film Twelve Angry Men, Mayor West is brought on trial for murder, and it is up to the jury of twelve of Quahog's finest to determine if he is guilty or not.
205	17	"Bigfat"	Julius Wu	Brian Scully	April 14, 2013	AACX15	5.02
When Peter, Quagmire and Joe decide to take a road trip to Canada, their plane crashes and Peter goes missing for a few months. When his family find him in the woods, he can no longer communicate intelligibly, so the Griffins decide to try to revert Peter back to his normal state.
206	18	"Total Recall"	Joseph Lee	Kristin Long	April 28, 2013	AACX16	4.89
After Rupert is recalled, Stewie and Brian head on an adventure to reclaim Rupert. Meanwhile, Peter is replaced by Lois in his bowling tournament mainly because of him being sick. However, he begins to get annoyed by the brewing friendship between his wife and his friends.
207	19	"Save the Clam"	Brian Iles	Chris Sheridan	May 5, 2013	AACX18	4.79
When Horace is killed during a softball game, it is up to Peter and the others to try and stop the Clam from being shut down by the bank. Meanwhile, Meg gets a job at a funeral home.
208	20	"Farmer Guy"	Mike Kim	Patrick Meighan	May 12, 2013	AACX19	4.82
After Peter buys a farm and sells the house on Craigslist to flee from Quahog's rising crime situation, he becomes a meth producer and dealer, which causes the family to be responsible for a flood of drugs into Quahog.
209	21	"Roads to Vegas"	Greg Colton	Steve Callaghan	May 19, 2013	AACX20	5.28
Brian and Stewie decide to spend a trip in Las Vegas. But when they attempt to use a teleporter to get there, a glitch in the system causes the duo to get split into two copies of themselves, with one Brian and Stewie getting all the luck, while the other Brian and Stewie are less fortunate.
210	22	"No Country Club for Old Men"	Jerry Langford	Teresa Hsiao	May 19, 2013	AACX21	5.16
The Griffins join Carter's country club, the Barrington, after Chris begins dating Amanda Barrington, whose family own the club. But when Peter ends up getting Carter thrown out of the club, along with the rest of the Griffins, Peter and Carter must join forces to put things right.

== Reception ==
The season received mixed reviews. Kevin McFarland of The A.V. Club gave a C+ rating for the season.

Review grades
#	Title	Air date	The A.V. Club (A-F)	TV Fanatic (5)	Sources
1	"Into Fat Air"	September 30, 2012	C	3.3	
2	"Ratings Guy"	October 7, 2012	B-	3.4	
3	"The Old Man and the Big 'C'"	November 4, 2012	B	3.0	
4	"Yug Ylimaf"	November 11, 2012	C	4.2	
5	"Joe's Revenge"	November 18, 2012	B	4.0	
6	"Lois Comes Out of Her Shell"	November 25, 2012	B-	3.6	
7	"Friends Without Benefits"	December 9, 2012	B	2.3	
8	"Jesus, Mary and Joseph!"	December 23, 2012	C	3.5	
9	"Space Cadet"	January 6, 2013	B-	3.0	
10	"Brian's Play"	January 13, 2013	A-	4.0	
11	"The Giggity Wife"	January 27, 2013	C-	2.2	
12	"Valentine's Day in Quahog"	February 10, 2013	B	4.6	
13	"Chris Cross"	February 17, 2013	C	1.5	
14	"Call Girl"	March 10, 2013	C-	3.2	
15	"Turban Cowboy"	March 17, 2013	D	2.5	
16	"12 and a Half Angry Men"	March 24, 2013	B-	—N/a	
17	"Bigfat"	April 14, 2013	C	2.8	
18	"Total Recall"	April 28, 2013	C-	3.4	
19	"Save the Clam"	May 5, 2013	B	3.0	
20	"Farmer Guy"	May 12, 2013	B	2.0	
21	"Roads to Vegas"	May 19, 2013	B+	4.4	
22	"No Country Club for Old Men"	May 19, 2013	C+	1.5	
Season			C+	2.4	
Average			C+	3.1	Average
