= Cherry Chevapravatdumrong =

American author and producer

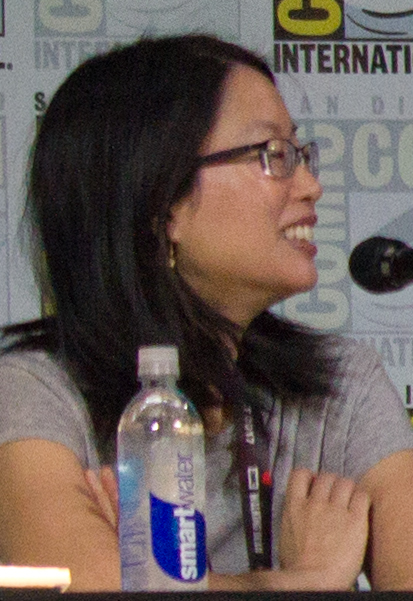
- Chevapravatdumrong at San Diego Comic-Con in July 2017
- Born: Cherry Chevapravatdumrong; December 1, 1977 (age 48); Columbus, Ohio, U.S.
- Other name: Cherry Cheva
- Education: Yale University (BA); New York University (JD)
- Occupations: Writer; editor; producer; author; lawyer
- Years active: 1998–present
- Known for: Family Guy; It Takes a Village Idiot, and I Married One (2007); She's So Money (2009); DupliKate (2009)

Cherry Chevapravatdumrong (/ˌtʃiːvəprɑːvətˈdʌmrɒŋ/; born December 1, 1977), also known as Cherry Cheva, is an American author, screenwriter, comedian, producer, and lawyer. She was an executive producer of Family Guy (at one time, its only female writer) and a co-executive producer of The Orville and Resident Alien.

She co-wrote and produced the 2023 film Joy Ride.

== Early life and education ==
Cherry Chevapravatdumrong was born to a Thai family in 1977, in Columbus, Ohio, and raised in Ann Arbor, Michigan, graduating from Huron High School in 1995, where she took several AP classes, editing the school's newspaper and played in orchestra. She majored in psychology at Yale University, where she wrote for The Yale Record, the college's humor magazine.

She later earned a Juris Doctor degree from New York University Law School, where she wrote for the comedic Law Revue. During law school, she spent her summers working at law firms and her winter breaks waiting tables at her parents' restaurant.

== Career ==
Chevapravatdumrong later moved to Los Angeles to pursue writing. Before working on Family Guy, she was a writer's assistant on the CBS series Listen Up She released two young adult novels, She's So Money and DupliKate, under the name Cherry Cheva.

=== Family Guy ===
Chevapravatdumrong was at one time the only female writer on Family Guy (a fact mentioned in the episode "Roasted Guy"), and also a co-executive producer. Her last name was used in its entirety in the episode "And I'm Joyce Kinney" as the real last name of Joyce Kinney. When asked why she changed her name, Joyce responds "because they would never let that name [Chevapravatdumrong] on TV."

In the episode "Jesus, Mary and Joseph!" Peter breaks the fourth wall by rearranging the letters of her name in the opening credits to say "Chemotherapy vanguard vCr" (with one "r" left over, which he throws at Lois in a childlike tantrum when she points this out).

In the episode "Dead Dog Walking", Peter again breaks the fourth wall by saying that her address is 11700 Hollywood Way, North Hollywood, CA 91065 (an address that does not actually exist), and that she is also a lawyer.

In the episode "No Giggity, No Doubt", Peter lists her name among examples of people (mainly other Family Guy characters, increasing in obscurity) who should go on an excursion with Meg: "Cherry Chevapravatdumrong, that's how that name is pronounced."

In the episode "The Bird Reich", Stewie lists her name among several others as examples of "Family Guy writers who wrote books, and nobody's ever heard of them".

==== Episodes ====
As writer:

- "Sibling Rivalry" (2006)
- "Saving Private Brian" (2006)
- "Prick Up Your Ears" (2006)
- "Boys Do Cry" (2007)
- "Ocean's Three and a Half" (2009)
- "We Love You, Conrad" (2009)
- "Hannah Banana" (2009)
- "And Then There Were Fewer" (2010)
- "It's a Trap!" (2011)
- "The Blind Side" (2012)
- "Friends Without Benefits" (2012)
- "Quagmire's Quagmire" (2013)
- "Turkey Guys" (2014)
- "Candy, Quahog Marshmallow" (2016)
- "Gronkowsbees" (2017)
- "Dog Bites Bear" (2018)
- "Throw It Away" (2019)
- "Holly Bibble" (2020)

As executive story editor:

- "Chick Cancer" (2006)
- "Barely Legal" (2006)
- "The Tan Aquatic with Steve Zissou" (2007)
- "Airport '07" (2007)
- "Bill & Peter's Bogus Journey" (2007)
- "No Meals on Wheels" (2007)
- "McStroke" (2008)

As story editor:

- "You May Now Kiss the... Uh... Guy Who Receives" (2006)
- "The Griffin Family History" (2006)

As co-producer:

- "Back to the Woods" (2008)
- "Play it Again, Brian" (2008)
- "The Former Life of Brian" (2008)
- "Long John Peter" (2008)
- "Love, Blactually" (2008)
- "I Dream of Jesus" (2008)
- "Road to Germany" (2008)
- "Baby Not on Board" (2008)
- "The Man with Two Brians" (2008)
- "Family Gay" (2009)
- "420" (2009)
- "Three Kings" (2009)
- "Spies Reminiscent of Us" (2009)
- "Go, Stewie, Go" (2010)
- "Quagmire's Dad" (2010)
- "Something, Something, Something Dark Side" (2010)
- "Mr. & Mrs. Stewie" (2012)

=== The Orville ===
She also worked with Seth MacFarlane on the sci-fi series The Orville.

- "Firestorm" (Season 1, Episode 10)
- "Home" (Season 2, Episode 3)
- "Sanctuary" (Season 2, Episode 12)
- "Mortality Paradox" (Season 3, Episode 3)

=== Other work ===
Chevapravatdumrong co-wrote and produced the 2023 film Joy Ride.

=== Books ===
- It Takes a Village Idiot, and I Married One. Harper. 2007. ISBN 978-0061143328. with Alex Borstein
- She's So Money. Harper. 2009. ISBN 978-0061288531.
- DupliKate. Harper. 2009. ISBN 978-0061288548.
