= Valentine's Day in Quahog =

- Family Guy episode
- Episode no.: Season 11; Episode 12
- Directed by: Bob Bowen
- Written by: Daniel Palladino
- Production code: AACX11
- Original air date: February 10, 2013

Guest appearances
- Dee Bradley Baker as Gremlin; Mike Barker as Homosexual Man; Drew Barrymore as Jillian Russell; Jessica Biel as Brooke Roberts; Alexandra Breckenridge as Unnamed woman #1; Kat Foster as Carolyn; Emily Osment as Sandy; Keir Gilchrist as Toby; Julie Hagerty as Carol West; Tatum Hentemann as Young Lois; Alexis Knapp as Girl #3; Christine Lakin as Nurse/Girl #1; Rachael MacFarlane as Quagmire's Mistress; Nicole Sullivan as Unnamed woman #2; Cheryl Tiegs as herself; Nana Visitor as Rita

Episode chronology
← Previous "The Giggity Wife"	Next → "Chris Cross"
- Family Guy season 11

"Valentine's Day in Quahog" is the twelfth episode of the eleventh season and the 200th overall episode of the animated comedy series Family Guy. It aired on Fox in the United States on February 10, 2013. The episode was written by Daniel Palladino and directed by Bob Bowen.

In the episode, to engage in romance for Valentine's Day, Peter and Lois decide to spend the day in bed. Meanwhile, Stewie travels back in time to the 1960s and kisses a girl who turns out to be his mother; Meg has a kidney stolen by the boy she met online; Quagmire appears to be a woman; Chris grows a crush on Herbert's grand-niece; Consuela crosses the border to be with her husband; Brian is visited by his ex-girlfriends; and Mayor West saves Carol from making another love mistake.

== Plot ==
Following a special Valentine's Day opening set to "I Gotta Feeling" (and referencing the film Valentine's Day), the episode is shown in different Valentine's Day stories occurring on the same day:

- Lois talks Peter into spending the day in bed. As Peter tries to make things romantic, Lois finds that spending the day together is not as neat as she planned. Peter gets a call from a former girlfriend named Samantha who tries to separate Peter from Lois.
- Meg heads out for a date with a guy from the Internet named Toby who actually believes she is prettier than her picture. On their date, Meg finds things they have in common but gets knocked out and awakes in a motel room to find that Toby stole her kidney for his boss. Despite her missing kidney, she holds her date to a promise of a full day together. True to his word, they have a full day's date. After their day out, Toby decides to give Meg back her kidney, revealing that he stole another one for Madonna and they both kiss.
- Following a one-night's stand where Glenn Quagmire has his date thrown out when she refuses to leave, the woman vows that Quagmire will one day get what he deserves. Following a shock from an electronic "Tampon Warmer" (hair straightener) that the woman left behind, Quagmire awakens to find that he suddenly appears as a woman named "Glenda Vajmire" fooling even Joe who hits on her when Joe pulls Quagmire over. When he goes to the hospital to handle this problem, Dr. Hartman plans to give him a pelvic exam. Escaping from Dr. Hartman, Quagmire realizes he has really been turned into a woman and decides to make the best of things by being a lesbian.
- Consuela sneaks over the border to be with her husband Juan. Consuela then "freshens up" before making love with Juan.
- Chris goes to visit Herbert to collect the money for Herbert's subscription, but Herbert's grand-niece Sandy falls for him. She goes to Chris and with Herbert's coaching gets a date.
- Deciding to find out what love was like in the 60s, Stewie falls for a girl on a time travel trip and follows her. Opening up, he kisses her only to find out that it really is Lois who is picked up by Carter Pewterschmidt. After throwing up, Stewie returns to the present where Brian worriedly asks him what happened, only for Stewie to profanely blow him off. Offended, Brian asks Stewie "You kiss your mother with that mouth?" and this causes Stewie to puke again.
- To help Brian get to the bottom of his lack of success with women, Stewie invites all of Brian's former girlfriends over (consisting of Jillian Russell, Cheryl Tiegs, Lauren Conrad, Quagmire's dad Ida, Carolyn from "Love, Blactually," Brooke Roberts from "Brian the Bachelor," Rita from "Brian's Got a Brand New Bag," Tina from "The Thin White Line," Denise from "Tiegs for Two," Kate from "The Blind Side," Carter Pewterschmidt's dog Seabreeze from "Screwed the Pooch," Tracy Flannigan from "The Former Life of Brian," Cindy from "Yug Ylimaf," Miss Emily from "Be Careful What You Fish For," the college girl from "Mr. and Mrs. Stewie", and Gizmo from Gremlins and Gremlins 2: The New Batch; Jenny from "Friends of Peter G." and Shauna Parks from "Peter's Got Woods", however, are missing). To discuss what went wrong with their relationships. Brian gets angry and lashes out at the criticism and starts to dish out criticism of his own. He finally turns on Stewie as well who sends the women after Brian and they chase him through the streets as they pass the Kool-Aid Man and his parents waiting for his date – a bottle of Yoo-hoo who acts like a stereotypical black woman.
- After appointing a pumpkin as the new chief of police, Mayor Adam West finds out from one of his aides that Carol is spending time with the Mayor of Weekapaug and vows to win her back. Mayor Adam West arrives at the opening of a City Park (which is also a future homosexual meeting spot) and engages the Mayor of Weekapaug in a battle until he wins by planting a flag pin in the Mayor of Weekapaug's left eye. Carol West apologizes to Mayor Adam West as she vows not to leave him again. Although Mayor McCheese of McDonaldland also shows up to have a fling with Carol.

At the end of the day, the following scenes occur as Nat King Cole's "L-O-V-E" is played in the background:

- Peter and Lois make passionate love as Peter recalls having sex with another woman named Flora at their wedding.
- Mayor Adam West cuts the ribbons on an otherwise naked Carol.
- Chris and Sandy have popsicles as Herbert watches.
- Consuela meets up with her family.
- Lois kisses Stewie goodnight as he vomits again.
- Meg stores her kidney in her room.
- Brian is lying in bed smiling with 14 of his past girlfriends having had an orgy with them.

The final scene shows Peter and Lois sleeping in bed until Peter has a seizure.

== Reception ==
The episode received a 2.5 rating and was watched by a total of 4.71 million people, this made it the most watched show on Animation Domination that night beating The Cleveland Show, Bob's Burgers, American Dad! and The Simpsons. The episode was met with generally positive reviews from critics. Carter Dotson of TV Fanatic gave the episode four and a half stars out of five, saying "But, really, what made this tick was that there was an intelligence to the established characters. The situations were ludicrous, but all the characters felt like they acted in the ways that they are expected to. The episode is credited to Daniel Palladino (husband of Gilmore Girls and Bunheads creator Amy Sherman-Palladino), and as the intro said, he was a writer on Who’s the Boss? It’s digging deep for a reference, but including every single girlfriend Brian has had (including Seabreeze!) fits the bill too. This was just all-around a well-constructed run-through for the series. They may be self-deprecating and joke about their decline, but they can still pump out a winner." Kevin McFarland of The A.V. Club gave the episode a B, saying "This is a proficient parody of an easy target, skewering the bloated, monotonous romantic vignette films that somehow made a dent at the box office over the past few years. It’s not a standout, but “Valentine’s Day In Quahog” manages to avoid being just another Valentine's Day episode by deriding the most basic examples of the form."
