= Ratings Guy =

- Family Guy episode
- Episode no.: Season 11; Episode 2
- Directed by: James Purdum
- Written by: Dave Ihlenfeld; David Wright
- Production code: AACX01
- Original air date: October 7, 2012

Guest appearances
- J. J. Abrams as himself; Sandra Bernhard as herself; Mark Burnett as himself; Dan Castellaneta as Homer Simpson; Michael Clarke Duncan as guy in cowboy boots; Billy Gardell as Mike Biggs; Jon Hamm as himself; Kadeem Hardison as NBA player; Dick Wolf as himself

Episode chronology
← Previous "Into Fat Air"	Next → "The Old Man and the Big 'C'"
- Family Guy season 11

"Ratings Guy" is the second episode of the eleventh season of the animated comedy series Family Guy, and the 190th episode overall. It originally aired on the Fox network in the United States on October 7, 2012. The episode follows the Griffin family becoming a Nielsen family and Peter attempting to take over the TV airwaves.

This episode was dedicated to the memory of both Phyllis Diller (who voiced Thelma Griffin in several episodes of the show) and Michael Clarke Duncan (who had a brief voice role in this episode). This episode was also one of Duncan's final roles before his death from complications following a heart attack, which occurred a month prior to the air date.

== Plot ==
The Griffins receive a letter from the Nielsen Company telling them they have been selected to have their viewing habits monitored. Tom Tucker comes to the door, having heard of the Griffins becoming a Nielsen family, and asks Peter for some suggestions to change the show. Tom performs Peter's crazy suggestions on the air, which displeases Peter's friends Joe and Quagmire. When the Nielsen representative returns to reset the card on his Nielsen box, Peter takes the opportunity to steal a bunch of Nielsen boxes so he can have a much bigger impact on the ratings.

Peter soon forces many shows to make outlandish changes to "improve" them, which angers Lois and Joe, and an angry mob issue their complaints towards Peter for what he did to some of their favorite TV shows. After barely getting medical help and getting kicked out of the Drunken Clam, Peter realizes he won't be able to show face around Quahog again unless he fixes things, and decides to try and fix television, but Mayor Adam West shows up and shoots the boxes to pieces to prevent Peter from ruining his favorite TV shows further and in retaliation for Peter adding an extra tree on One Tree Hill. With the boxes destroyed, Brian believes that they are now sunk, but suddenly Peter comes up with another plan.

Peter goes to the Television Producers Guild for help, stating that he is the man who ruined television and is going to fix it. He gathers many TV producers (including J.J. Abrams, Mark Burnett, Dick Wolf, Jon Hamm and Kelsey Grammer) to discuss ideas to make their shows better again. Abrams comes up with an idea about a show that details an alien that goes back in time and encounters a koala in an Eastern European town and Peter tells him to go with that idea. Peter then has four TV producers to make 15 workplace comedies where people talk to the camera for some reason, thus breaking the fourth wall. Burnett is asked by Peter to give him a reality show where people do horrible, unforgivable things to each other for embarrassingly small sums of money. Peter then has two TV producers leave to make a show about horrible New Jersey freaks and tells Wolf to give him the same Law & Order six times. Peter tells the TV producers from Bravo do a show about women fighting.

Every television show goes back to normal as Peter is friends with Joe and Quagmire again. Peter quotes "Well, let's drink to having TV back in the hands of people who know what they're doing." The final scene shows that Herbert has repaired the Nielsen boxes which Mayor West destroyed and is using them to make his own changes to TV. He calls up Disney Channel to have Zack and Cody in their underpants, claiming that their show would be funnier that way.

== Production ==
"Ratings Guy" was written by Dave Ihlenfeld and David Wright. "Ratings Guy" is the second episode they wrote together, with "Grumpy Old Man" being the first. "Ratings Guy" is the sixth episode to parody the show's title, after "Family Gay", "Family Goy", "Business Guy", "German Guy", and "Amish Guy". Ihlenfeld and Wright were freelance writers for the show, and had not previously written for any previous Family Guy episodes. The production staff had wanted "Ratings Guy" to be about politics, but director Pete Michels decided otherwise. A week earlier, he had pitched an idea suggesting that Peter would try to mess up television "in the weirdest way he can". This idea was often debated and discussed in the writers' room extensively by the staff, who wanted the episode to be about the Griffin family climbing Mount Everest; this idea was later used for the previous episode, "Into Fat Air". The idea for the episode was pitched by Alec Sulkin, who joined Family Guy in its fourth season, co-writing the episode "Petarded" with Wellesley Wild. Unlike Ihlenfeld and Wright, Sulkin has written for various episodes and has served as a producer since he joined the show. "Ratings Guy" was directed by James Purdum, who storyboarded half of the episode himself and partially worked on the animation with Brian Iles. "Ratings Guy" is Purdum's first episode for the show's eleventh season. Purdum had joined Family Guy as an animation director when he directed the fourth season episode "The Cleveland–Loretta Quagmire" and has since served as a supervising producer. The scene where Peter adds an extra tree on One Tree Hill was constantly debated by the writers and staff, who are fans of the show and all wanted the scene to be deleted. At one point, Family Guy creator Seth MacFarlane even wanted the scene to be deleted; however, the animators objected to deleting it, as they thought the scene was funny and insisted the writers keep it.

Filmmaker J.J. Abrams guest-starred in the episode as a fictionalized version of himself. Abrams was a confessed fan of the show and had telephoned the show's production staff to ask if he could produce or assist in an episode's creation. Commenting on his appearance in the episode with Entertainment Weekly, Abrams said: "I know Family Guy is edgier than The Simpsons or Bob's Burgers, but I love the show personally. That's why I called the show's staff." Actress and stand-up comedian Sandra Bernhard guest-starred in the episode as a fictionalized version of herself, in a cutaway gag critiquing celebrity culture and political figures. Bernhard agreed to guest star on the condition that her fictionalized self reflect her career and lifestyle. When animating Bernhard, the writers used a stock photo of her that she had sent the animators when she agreed to appear as a model. Bernhard's face was given a gap between her teeth and more wrinkles under her eyes, as well as a bigger chin.

British television and film producer Mark Burnett guest-starred in "Ratings Guy" as a fictionalized version of himself, appearing when Peter gathers many TV producers to discuss ideas to make their shows better again. Burnett stated that he was a "big fan" of Family Guy and had "always wanted" to appear on the show. When Burnett agreed to guest star on the show, he insisted that his dialogue be written entirely by himself; Ihlenfeld allowed this, as he said this would "allow me to take a break". Dan Castellaneta reprised his role as Homer Simpson from fellow animated sitcom The Simpsons in a brief cameo after Peter rushes to the Neilsen TV ratings studio. Homer had previously appeared in the episodes "Movin' Out (Brian's Song)" and "The Juice Is Loose", both of which he was voiced by Jeff Bergman. Castellaneta agreed to reprise his role on the condition that the episode portray Homer accurately. The writers used an online image of Homer to use as a model to accurately portray him as Castellaneta asked for.

Actor Michael Clarke Duncan guest-starred in the episode, appearing briefly in a cutaway gag as a guy wearing cowboy boots. Duncan had previously guest-starred in the third and final part of Stewie Griffin: The Untold Story—"Stu and Stewie's Excellent Adventure" as a stork. "Ratings Guy" is one of Duncan's final roles before his death from complications following a heart attack a month earlier. He had recorded his lines in May, four months before his death on September 3, 2012. Actor and stand-up comedian Billy Gardell reprised his role as Mike Biggs from the sitcom Mike & Molly in a cutaway gag. A fan of Mike & Molly, MacFarlane decided to contact Gardell to recruit him to reprise his role as Biggs. Gardell agreed to reprise his role on the condition that he would get paid a salary of $600,000; the producers agreed to this condition. Actor and producer Jon Hamm guest-starred in "Ratings Guy" as a fictionalized version of himself, appearing when Peter gathers many TV producers to discuss ideas to make their shows better again. Hamm agreed to appear on the condition that Fox's proposed salary of $400,000 increase to $560,000; Fox agreed on the condition that Hamm portray himself. Television producer Dick Wolf guest-starred as a fictionalized version of himself, appearing when Peter gathers many TV producers to discuss ideas to make his shows better again. A confessed fan of Family Guy, Wolf had previously called the show's staff to appear in an episode, but he was rejected many times. He agreed to appear in "Ratings Guy" on the condition that he be animated accurately, write his own dialogue, and be paid a salary of $550,000; MacFarlane and Fox agreed to his proposals.

== Reception ==
"Ratings Guy" originally aired on the Fox network in the United States on October 7, 2012. The episode received a 3.4 rating and was watched by a total of 6.70 million people, this made it the most watched show on Animation Domination that night, beating The Cleveland Show, Bob's Burgers, American Dad! and The Simpsons with 6.57 million. The episode was met with mixed reviews from critics. Kevin McFarland of The A.V. Club gave the episode a B−, saying "Ratings Guy" didn't insult Nielsen viewers for championing shows that are at odds with critical consensus or ignoring the “best shows” like AMC's cable darlings or HBO/Showtime material, which I'll take as a small saving grace. It focused more on the production end, how the industry grovels and panders to the masses in hopes that they can mechanically churn out desirable programming at the lowest possible cost, instead of striving to produce something of quality and finding a way to make it work. There's a deeper point somewhere in this episode. But after a first act that easily punctuated beats with a lot of laughs, whatever it is Seth MacFarlane and the writers wanted to say about television in general, and how Nielsen ratings disproportionately affect what the industry produces, got muffled by a mood-killing second act and a sloppy conclusion.

Carter Dotson of TV Fanatic gave the episode three and a half stars out of five, saying "Yet the show painted such broad strokes, as it does tend to do, that it didn’t really have a whole lot to say, other than that they think idiots determine what’s ‘popular’ and what isn't. Yeah, that's an original viewpoint. It's ironic that this show, hardly the most intelligent one on TV, is determined to be more popular than a show like Bob’s Burgers, thanks to the Nielsen ratings. Stones, glass houses, and whatnot, though it was low ratings that caused the show to die twice. But it's also the same ratings that's caused the show to keep going, through its cable revival and high ratings since then. And as with every criticism of Nielsen, there's no real solution for what to do that's better, really. So it winds up all feeling like empty words. It may have been topical, but it felt punchless. I was moderately amused, but felt like there was so much more that could have been said. It's a waste of the platform for only a few reference-based yuks."
