= Into Fat Air =

- Family Guy episode
- Episode no.: Season 11; Episode 1
- Directed by: Joseph Lee
- Written by: Alec Sulkin
- Production code: 9ACX21
- Original air date: September 30, 2012

Guest appearances
- Elizabeth Banks as Pam Fishman; Chris Cox as Ross Fishman; Martin Spanjers as Ben Fishman

Episode chronology
← Previous "Internal Affairs"	Next → "Ratings Guy"
- Family Guy season 11

"Into Fat Air" is the eleventh season premiere of the animated comedy series Family Guy, and the 189th episode overall. It originally aired on the Fox network in the United States on September 30, 2012. The episode follows the Griffin family having dinner with Lois' old boyfriend's family and climbing Mt. Everest.

The episode was written by Alec Sulkin and directed by Joseph Lee. "Into Fat Air" received mixed reviews from television critics for its storyline and cultural references. According to the Nielsen ratings, it was viewed in 6.55 million homes in its original airing. The episode featured guest performances by Elizabeth Banks and Martin Spanjers, along with several recurring guest voice actors for the series.

== Plot ==
When Lois tells Peter of a dinner date with her former boyfriend Ross Fishman (who was previously seen in "Stuck Together, Torn Apart"), his wife Pam, and their son Ben, Peter is distressed. When Ross brags about their family vacations and that they plan to climb Mt. Everest, Peter, sick of his attitude, claims that the Griffins will also climb the mountain. When they return home, Peter realizes he overspoke and asks Lois to make up an excuse, but Lois is also annoyed by the Fishmans' smug attitude and proposes they actually climb Mt. Everest.

Arriving in Nepal, the Griffins find the Fishmans, who are surprised they actually followed through with the trip. While climbing, they discover they are ahead of the Fishmans. But when they reach the top, they discover the Fishmans beat them there. As they start back down, things go awry when they get stuck on the mountainside in the middle of a massive storm. Starving after Peter mistook trail mix for a mix tape, they come across the dead frozen body of Ben and decide to eat him to survive. They pass Ross and Pam, who are going back up the mountain searching for their son, and come within sight of base camp. But as Lois watches the storm clouds, she decides to have the family go after the Fishmans to save them from certain death. They discover the Fishmans lying unconscious in a crevasse and send Peter down on a rope to rescue them. Peter barely gets Ross and Pam out alongside the rock he saved before the family heads back to base camp. Back at base camp, Ross and Pam are loaded onto a helicopter to be taken to a hospital to recuperate. As Ross and Pam are airlifted out, Peter casually reveals that they ate their son, but before the Fishmans can speak, Peter signals the pilot to leave, and the helicopter takes off, thus ending the episode.

== Production and development ==
The episode was written by Alec Sulkin and directed by Joseph Lee. Steve Callaghan, Mark Hentemann, Danny Smith, Alec Sulkin and Wellesley Wild served as executive producers, and James Purdum, Dominic Bianchi as supervising directors.

It featured guest performances from Elizabeth Banks and Martin Spanjers, along with recurring guest stars.

== Reception ==
"Into Fat Air" was broadcast on September 30, 2012, as a part of an animated television night on Fox, and was preceded by the season premiere of The Simpsons ("Moonshine River") and Family Guy creator Seth MacFarlane's other series American Dad! ("Love, AD Style"). It was watched by 6.55 million viewers, according to Nielsen ratings and acquired a 3.3/8 rating/share.

The episode received mixed reviews. Kevin McFarland from The A.V. Club gave the episode a C, saying "The only parts of this episode that didn't feel cobbled together from previous episodes and other shows (the mountain climbing plot, the cannibalism sequence, the family dinner gone awry) were the cutaways, which is pretty typical of Family Guy at this point. It's anticlimactic, like when you realize there's about 11 minutes of action in a three-hour football game."

Carter Doston from TV Fanatic gave the episode three and a half stars out of five, saying "There were a lot of funny little lines, some cutaways that largely fell flat, It wasn't great, but I've sure seen worse from this series."
