= Joe's Revenge =

- Family Guy episode
- Episode no.: Season 11; Episode 5
- Directed by: Bob Bowen
- Written by: Julius Sharpe
- Production code: AACX03
- Original air date: November 18, 2012

Guest appearances
- Scott Grimes as Kevin Swanson; Jim Parsons as Gay-Jacker; Will Sasso as Bobby "The Shirt" Briggs; Patrick Stewart as Susie Swanson (inner monologue voice)

Episode chronology
← Previous "Yug Ylimaf"	Next → "Lois Comes Out of Her Shell"
- Family Guy season 11

"Joe's Revenge" is the fifth episode of the eleventh season of the animated comedy series Family Guy. It originally aired on the Fox network in the United States on November 18, 2012. In the episode, when Bobby “The Shirt” Briggs, the criminal who shot Joe years ago, leaving him in a wheelchair for the rest of his life, becomes a fugitive, Quagmire, Joe and Peter team up to hunt the bad guy down. The episode received mostly positive reviews for its storyline and cultural references.

== Plot ==
While watching Quahog 5 News at The Drunken Clam, Peter, Joe, and Quagmire hear that notorious heroin mogul Bobby “The Shirt” Briggs (an apparent reference to the Twin Peaks character of the same name) - who began a minor drug-running operation in 1996 – has finally been caught after fifteen years on the run. Admitting to having lied about losing the use of his legs during a fight with the Grinch on the roof of an orphanage, (Note: As depicted in "A Hero Sits Next Door".) Joe reveals the truth: after being exposed in an undercover infiltration of the heroin operation, Joe was shot by Briggs point-blank in the legs.

A party is held at Joe's house to celebrate his justice, with him finally gaining some closure about Briggs; Joe even points out the previous night was the first night in fifteen years he didn't strangle Bonnie in his sleep. However, Kevin informs him that Tom Tucker is reporting a breaking news story about Bobby Briggs escaping police custody during a prison open house. Joe is horrified by all this and desperately goes to the Police Chief, demanding to be put on the case. He is turned down however, as the Police Chief states that Joe is "too close to the case" and assigns the job to two other police officers that are so far from the case, they don't even care about it at all. Back at The Drunken Clam, Joe expresses his lament. Seeing his friend's anguish, Peter volunteers himself and Quagmire as backup on a mission to catch Briggs. Despite misgivings about police protocol, Joe agrees to the plan and reveals that he has an entire room in his house full of information on Bobby Briggs (this explains why Kevin and Susie both share a room). Their first stop is Atlantic City, where a stripper named Tanya (who is known to have been Briggs' only relationship) works.

Before the trio departs, Quagmire leaves with Lois his newest cat Principessa (a full-blooded Persian cat), along with very exact instructions about caring for it. In Atlantic City, the trio find Briggs' girl at a strip club. When Joe's direct questioning fails, Quagmire cites his ability to communicate with strippers, extracting Bobby Briggs' exact address through a sexual osmosis he calls the "Vulcan V meld". Back in Quahog, Brian grows jealous of the attention Quagmire's cat gets and gives. When Chris states cats are better than dogs, Brian is injured trying to prove that dogs also always land on their feet.

In Atlantic City, the three easily locate Briggs' apartment. Joe is able to confront Briggs who nonetheless escapes after throwing a blanket into Joe's face. A rooftop chase ensues, which results in Joe's being able to survive being dropped several stories by landing directly on his legs. Nonetheless, Bobby Briggs is able to escape by hiding behind the bus on a suddenly appearing Extreme Makeover: Home Edition. Joe, Quagmire, and Peter are then arrested by two police officers for interfering with the case. However, in the police car, Joe recognizes one of the officers' name tags reading "Flannigan". He recalls Flannigan as one of the corrupt officers who had been involved in hiding Briggs while he was on the run for fifteen years. Realizing they have been arrested by corrupt officers (and probably the ones who pretended to arrest Briggs and then helped him escape from police custody during a prison open house in the first place), the guys enlist the help of Quagmire, who manages to free them from handcuffs using a combination of his Swiss Army Penis and acetylene torch penis, and the three steal the police cruiser. Peter reveals that he has been saving (for a trip scrapbook) a phone number he picked up at Briggs' apartment. Joe recognizes the area code as being for Juárez, Mexico, and deduces that Briggs is trying to flee the country; the three jet off for El Paso in an attempt to head off Briggs.

Back in Quahog, Principessa is seen kneading at a sleeping Lois' breasts. Brian attempts to subtly substitute his own paws for the cat's, but Lois awakens. Brian knocks her out with a lamp and drives off in jealousy of the cat. Having reached the border, Joe, Peter, and Quagmire wait in the scorching heat, before realizing it may be days until Briggs comes through, as he is presumably traveling by car. After passing some time at El Paso's Pershing House, the trio check traffic until Briggs arrives. Joe gives chase as Briggs jumps into the Rio Grande, and is eventually able to corner Briggs at gunpoint. He shoots Briggs in the legs after a speech about the consequences of being crippled. He only intends to cripple Briggs as revenge, but Briggs bleeds to death through his femoral artery. Quagmire then nonchalantly kicks Briggs' corpse into the river, carrying it away to Mexico. Joe, Peter, and Quagmire return to Quahog and Joe thanks the others for risking their lives for him. Peter and Quagmire then notice blood dripping out of Joe's pant leg, and Joe replies that he had suffered testicular rupture in the river during the fight with Briggs, as the episode ends.

== Reception ==
The episode received a 2.6 rating and was watched by a total of 5.14 million people, making it the most watched show on Animation Domination that night, beating Bob's Burgers, American Dad! and The Simpsons with 5.06 million. The episode was met with positive reviews from critics.

Carter Dotson of TV Fanatic gave the episode four out of five stars, saying "In reality, this whole episode seemed very self-aware. From Quagmire’s comment through clenched teeth to Peter to not volunteer him for things like this... to getting to El Paso a couple days ahead of Bobby Briggs... to the aforementioned continuity nods, this was written with a relative intelligence for the series."
