= The Old Man and the Big 'C' =

- Family Guy episode
- Episode no.: Season 11; Episode 3
- Directed by: Brian Iles
- Written by: Anthony Blacsucci; Mike Desilets
- Production code: 9ACX22
- Original air date: November 4, 2012

Guest appearances
- John de Lancie as Pewterschmidt Industries Executive; Phil LaMarr as Stand-Up Comedian; Jerry Lambert; Sherry Romito; Mae Whitman as Girl

Episode chronology
← Previous "Ratings Guy"	Next → "Yug Ylimaf"
- Family Guy season 11

"The Old Man and the Big 'C'" is the third episode of the eleventh season of the animated comedy series Family Guy and the 191st episode overall. It originally aired on the Fox network in the United States on November 4, 2012. It was initially going to be aired on October 21, 2012 but due to a previous rainout, the NLCS Game 6 bumped all the sitcoms of Animation Domination.

== Plot ==
At a Boston Red Sox ballgame, Quagmire accidentally loses his toupée going for a fly ball, and it is put up on the scoreboard and YouTube. When he becomes a laughingstock both at the game and due to a Kia Motors-sponsored story with the slogan, "Too bad it's a Kia," on Quahog 5, he decides to ditch the wig. The change in his appearance affects his attitude. The guys become reluctant to hang out with him and convince him to get a hair transplant.

At the hospital for Quagmire's hair transplant, Brian wanders off and overhears that Carter has terminal cancer. He returns and tells Stewie who confirms it via online camera in the Pewterschmidt house. Brian tells Lois who rounds up the family and heads for her parents' home, but when they arrive they find Carter in good health, Lois becomes angry at a stunned Brian for surprising her like that, with Meg shaming him, and Peter saying "he will get it when he drinks". Brian suspects that Carter is an impostor in order to protect the family business interests and convinces Stewie to come with him to prove his theory.

Brian and Stewie follow Carter around in Pewterschmidt Industries in order to prove he is an impostor. They hear Carter talking to one of his executives about a "Specimen Z" in the sub-levels that might be the description for the "real" Carter Pewterschmidt. While sneaking into a sub-level medical facility to find "Specimen Z," Brian and Stewie discover that "Specimen Z" is actually for a chemical that is the cure for cancer. Carter finds them in the room where it is being held and reveals that he has been sitting on the cure since 1999 in order to protect his sales of treatment pharmaceuticals. Carter then has the security guards throw Brian and Stewie out.

As Brian fumes on their way home, Stewie reveals that he stole the cure. They take it home to show Lois, but Carter arrives with his men to take it back and Brian tells what it is. Lois is appalled, but Carter refuses to show pity until she brings up some of his closest loved ones possibly dying of cancer. After an argument with Lois, Carter promises to reveal the cure.

The next day in a press release, Carter only gives the news of a new type of deodorant for mentally disabled people called "Slow Stick" (a parody of Speed Stick), which is also apparently edible. Lois calls to find out why he did not reveal the secret as Carter reveals that he lied before hanging up on her. The episode ends with Peter assuring to Lois that they will get over the fact that Carter's a bad man when he is shown on the cover of Forbes Magazine with devil-like horns.

== Reception ==
The episode received a 2.5 rating and was watched by a total of 5.11 million people, this made it the second most watched show on Animation Domination that night, beating Bob's Burgers, The Cleveland Show and American Dad! but losing to The Simpsons with 5.54 million. The episode was met with mixed reviews from critics. Kevin McFarland of The A.V. Club gave the episode a B, saying "But even without an emotionally sweet turn, this is still the funniest episode of Family Guy so far this season. Tons of throwaway lines get laughs, and a surprising number of cutaways actually worked."

Carter Dotson of TV Fanatic gave the episode three out of five stars, saying "Even the cancer cure plot seemed half-baked. It was the typical glazing over of a message that was to be presented: just a top-level message that rich corporations would rather make money by treating cancer rather than curing it. A simple one, and handled by the show in the way that it usually does, like in the “legalize pot” episode: present the point and change nothing."
