= Chris Cross (Family Guy) =

- Family Guy episode
- Episode no.: Season 11; Episode 13
- Directed by: Jerry Langford
- Written by: Anthony Blasucci; Mike Desilets
- Production code: AACX10
- Original air date: February 17, 2013

Guest appearances
- Anne Murray as herself; H. Jon Benjamin as Carl

Episode chronology
← Previous "Valentine's Day in Quahog"	Next → "Call Girl"
- Family Guy season 11

"Chris Cross" is the thirteenth episode of the eleventh season and the 201st overall episode of the animated comedy series Family Guy. It aired on Fox in the United States on February 17, 2013. Written by Anthony Blasucci and Mike Desilets, the episode was directed by Jerry Langford. The episode revolves around Chris doing Meg's chores after she catches him in the act stealing money from Lois. Meanwhile, Stewie and Brian become fans of Canadian singer Anne Murray, who guest stars in the episode as herself.

== Plot ==
When Chris is teased at school for his generic brand Latvian sneakers, he asks for money but is turned down by Lois. He steals money from Lois' purse while she and Peter are out, but Meg catches him and demands that he do as she asks or she will tell their parents. Chris initially agrees, but Meg's requests go from basic sibling stuff to disturbing and criminal, such as stalking and prank calling girls going into Planned Parenthood and vandalizing Anne Frank's House every year. When Chris learns that Meg never intends to stop with her demands, he runs away to Herbert's house. Meg is forced to cover up the fact that Chris ran away while Herbert finds out the hard way that life with Chris is not all he fantasized about. When Chris pushes things too far by making a mess and refusing to get ready for a night out, a fed up Herbert kicks him out. Chris finds Meg looking for him. She apologizes and admits she missed him and Chris admits that they need each other to cope in the family. A regretful Herbert watches as they embrace each other and he drives away to cry about their "break up" to some friends.

Meanwhile, on the way home from a bad birthday party for a “friend” Lois met for Stewie, she puts on music to soothe his crankiness. He finds himself captivated by the sound of Anne Murray. Brian at first insults her music, but Stewie wins him over by singing "You Needed Me", during which Brian flashes back to memories of playing as a puppy with his mother, then starts crying when it is done. While listening to "Snowbird", they disagree over the meaning of the lyrics and decide Murray needs to explain the song's true meaning. Traveling to Canada to see her, she gives them both credit along with her own explanation. When Brian uses the restroom, Murray tells Stewie that Gene MacLellan would have known more about the song, since he wrote it. Enraged, Stewie ties up Murray and holds her at gunpoint, pronouncing her a fraud for not writing her own music. Brian returns and assures Stewie that this is standard in the music industry. This just makes Stewie conclude that everyone's a fraud, he forces Murray to sing "Snowbird" while gagged and bound as a moose listens to the song.

== Reception ==
The episode received a 2.4 rating in the 18-49 demographic and was watched by a total of 4.87 million viewers. This made it the most watched show on Fox's Animation Domination line-up that night, beating The Simpsons, American Dad!, Bob's Burgers and The Cleveland Show. The episode was met with mixed reviews from critics. Alasdair Wilkins of The A.V. Club gave the episode a C, saying "Without a clear comedic target, this storyline mostly gets by on more observational, low-key humor", although he did praise the sub-plot, saying that "the Brian and Stewie story is considerably better." Carter Dotson of TV Fanatic gave the episode one and a half stars out of five, saying "That they got the actual Anne Murray to voice herself in the episode was the funniest part of the storyline, which was otherwise unmemorable. There just was not a lot to laugh at."
