= Hannah Banana =

- Family Guy episode
- Episode no.: Season 8 Episode 5
- Directed by: John Holmquist
- Written by: Cherry Chevapravatdumrong
- Production code: 7ACX05
- Original air date: November 8, 2009

Guest appearance
- Candace Marie as Miley Cyrus

Episode chronology
← Previous "Brian's Got a Brand New Bag"	Next → "Quagmire's Baby"
- Family Guy season 8

"Hannah Banana" is the fifth episode of the eighth season of the American animated television series Family Guy. It originally aired on Fox in the United States on November 8, 2009. The episode follows Stewie Griffin after he sneaks backstage at a Miley Cyrus concert in Quahog, eventually discovering her horrible secret. Meanwhile, Chris Griffin proves to his family that the Evil Monkey who lives in his closet is real, and eventually comes to realize that the monkey is actually friendly, well-spoken and intelligent when he begins spending more time with him than with his own father.

First announced at the 2009 San Diego Comic-Con, the episode was written by Cherry Chevapravatdumrong and directed by John Holmquist. It received mixed reviews from critics for its storyline and cultural references. According to Nielsen ratings, it was viewed in 7.73 million homes on its original airing. The episode aired during an "all-Seth MacFarlane" line-up, along with the live-action special Seth and Alex's Almost Live Comedy Show, and featured a guest performance by Candace Marie, along with several recurring guest voice actors for the series. "Hannah Banana" was released on DVD along with seven other episodes from the season on June 15, 2010.

== Plot ==
Chris does poorly on a test at school and blames the Evil Monkey living in his closet. Chris sets up a camera in his room to capture the monkey. However, when that fails, Chris lures the monkey into a trap with free monkey food and catches him. The family is taken aback when Chris proves the monkey is real, but are less impressed by Meg showing her own evil albeit larger monkey, accusing her of mocking Chris. However, Chris's monkey turns out not to be evil after all, as he reveals that nine years prior, he got home from work one day and caught his wife cheating on him. Depressed after the divorce, which cost him his job and his house, he moved into Chris's closet. The monkey also reveals that the scary expression is the face he makes when thinking, the reason for him trembling while pointing at Chris was due to suffering from copper deficiency, and this whole time, he had really been trying to talk to Chris. The monkey apologizes to Chris for unintentionally terrorizing him and wishes to start over. Chris is at first unconvinced, but when the monkey helps him write a book report, he is surprised to receive a passing grade, and the two become great friends. Chris realizes that the monkey has spent more time with him than his dad Peter.

Meanwhile, Stewie, a self-proclaimed Hannah Montana fan, learns that Miley Cyrus is having a concert in Quahog. Tickets to the show are sold out, leaving him unable to attend the show. When Brian makes fun of Stewie for watching Hannah Montana, Stewie blackmails him into helping him get tickets for the concert by killing one of his brothers with an explosive dog collar and threatening to kill the other seven dogs from the litter. Brian and Stewie sneak in backstage at the concert and are confronted by Miley. Brian explains that Stewie has a "tumor" shaped head like a football, which convinces Miley to let them hang out with her. Miley and Stewie become best friends. While having ice cream with Miley, Stewie notices a signal interference on her cell phone when handing it to her. Upon spying on her, Stewie and Brian discover that she is actually an android clone created by Walt Disney Imagineering to be the perfect teen idol that can never fail. When a curious Brian asks if she can have sex, Stewie agrees to reprogram Miley. It goes wrong and only causes Miley to malfunction, forcing Stewie and Brian to run away.

Peter and Chris fight, which upsets Lois. The monkey tries to convince Peter and Chris into coming to dinner together. Peter admits that he does not hate Chris and vows to spend more time with him. They see Brian and Stewie running away from the malfunctioning Miley who rampages through the streets of Quahog, throwing cars and destroying buildings. The monkey confronts her, telling her to stop and criticizing her music; in retaliation, Miley ends up kidnapping the monkey and takes him to the top of a nearby skyscraper. Fortunately, Peter is able to recruit Quagmire to help him shoot her down in a biplane, and a King Kong-style battle with Miley begins. As Miley is riddled with shots, the monkey falls out of her hands and he grips onto a narrow ledge with one hand. Miley is pummelled off the top of the skyscraper. The monkey falls off the ledge but is saved by Peter just before he hits the road. As they stand beside Miley's motionless android body on the ground, Stewie tells Brian that this is his chance to have sex with her, but her body then explodes. Stewie apologizes, but Miley's dismembered robotic arm falls back out of the sky in front of them and Brian contemplates masturbating with it. After saying goodbye to Chris, the monkey moves out of the Griffin house and into the room of Tom Tucker's upside-down-faced son Jake, to help the two work through their relationship.

== Production and development ==
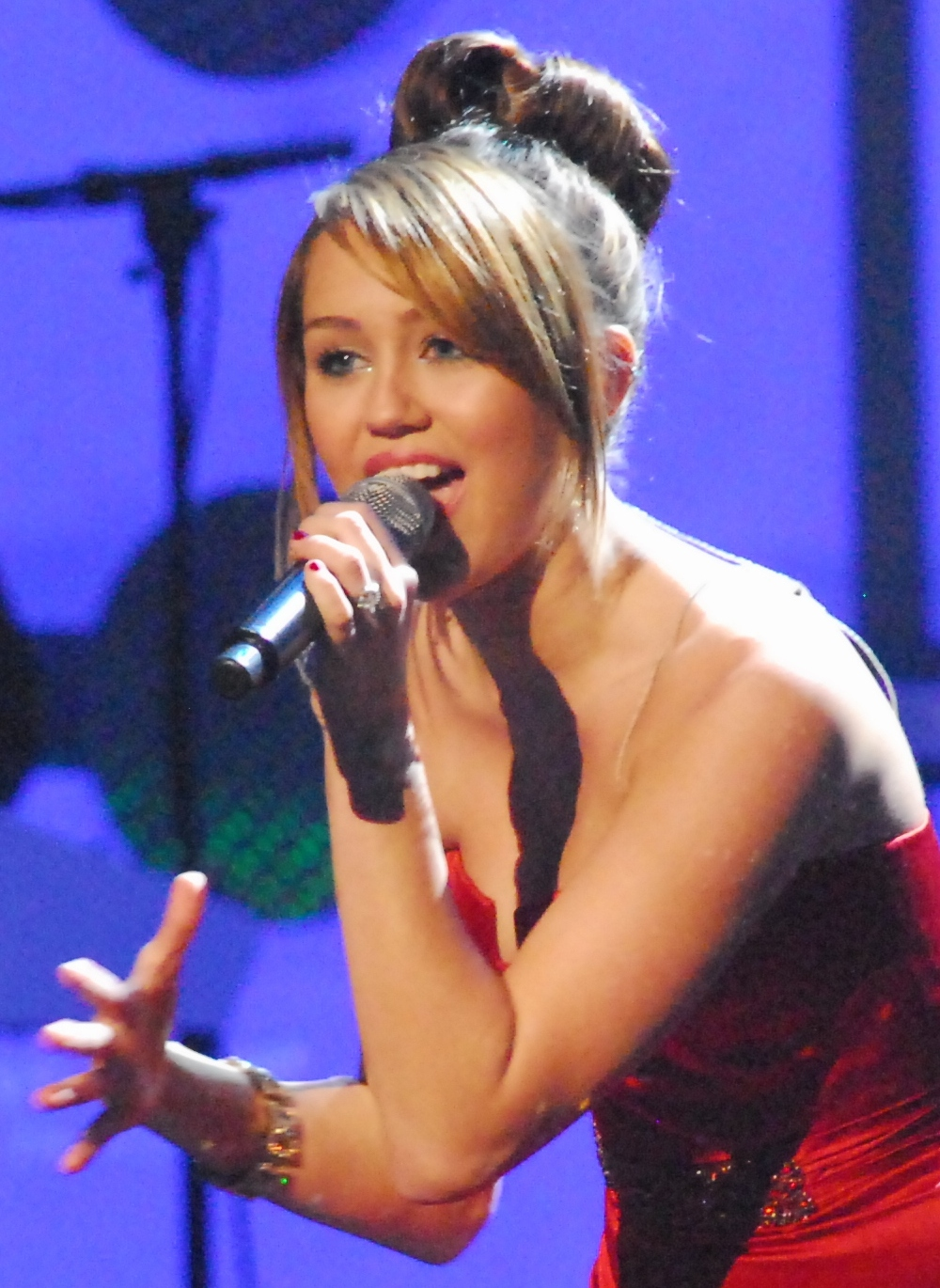
Miley Cyrus was parodied in the episode.

"Hannah Banana" was written by series regular Cherry Chevapravatdumrong and directed by John Holmquist, before the conclusion of the eighth production season. Commenting on the original development of the episode, series creator and executive producer Seth MacFarlane stated, "[The episode] was the result of our ongoing desire to let the series stagnate, and kind of evolve things that may have run their course. There's only so many times you can do the Evil Monkey jumping out of that closet, before the joke gets old, and I think often times there's a fear to mess with what works, and change things permanently. ... We literally retired the Evil Monkey in this episode, and got a great episode out of it, which was worth it, and kind of evolved the series in a way." Singer and actress Candace Marie provided the voice of Miley Cyrus. Marie received the role when her producer alerted her of the audition, and she eventually received a call from the Family Guy casting director a month later. Even though the episode mocked Cyrus, Marie did not think she would upset any of Cyrus' fans. She added that she is a fan herself, and "was very impressed by the way Family Guy developed the episode", and thought it was "a huge compliment for them to refer to Miley as the 'perfect popstar'". After voicing Cyrus, Marie was called back to Family Guy to voice Meg Griffin's friend Beth for "several upcoming episodes". Marie described Beth as a girl that is "rarely addressed in conversation but loves to chime in whenever she can". The song in the episode sung by Cyrus was written by Chevapravatdumrong, and composed and performed by Family Guy composer Walter Murphy.

The episode aired as a part of an "all-Seth MacFarlane" line-up, after the episode "Brian's Got a Brand New Bag" and the live-action special Seth and Alex's Almost Live Comedy Show. "Hannah Banana", along with the seven other episodes from Family Guy's eighth season, were released on a three-disc DVD set in the United States on June 15, 2010. The sets included brief audio commentaries by Seth MacFarlane and various crew and cast members for several episodes, a collection of deleted scenes, a special mini-feature which discussed the process behind animating "Road to the Multiverse", and mini-feature entitled Family Guy Karaoke. In addition to the regular cast, series regular, writer and executive producer Danny Smith voiced the Evil Monkey. Recurring guest voice actors Chris Cox, actor Ralph Garman, writer Alec Sulkin and writer John Viener made minor appearances throughout the episode.

== Cultural references ==
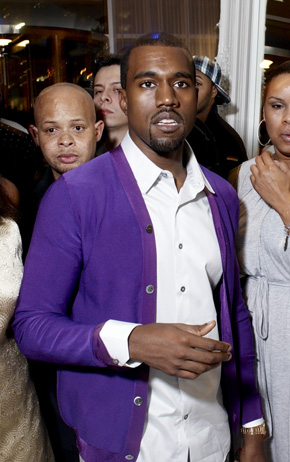
Rapper Kanye West was referenced in the episode.

In the opening scene of the episode, Chris alerts his parents of a failing grade he received at school on a science test, causing his mother to suggest he receive help on his homework. Chris then asks his father, Peter, for help who ends up rejecting him, leading Chris to blame his bad grades on the Evil Monkey, and announces that he will prove the monkey is real. Peter then suggests that his son would have to do a better job than God when he created actresses Ellen Barkin and Kelly McGillis.

Later that day, Stewie is shown watching television in the family room, with a narrator announcing a Hannah Montana marathon, as well as a concert in Quahog, Rhode Island, causing him to become excited. A scene from an episode of Hannah Montana is then shown, featuring Miley Cyrus, as well as her father, singer-songwriter Billy Ray Cyrus.

Deciding to sneak into the concert, Brian agrees to dress as rapper Kanye West, and is forced to sing one of his songs by a security guard. Despondent, Brian then begins singing the theme song to the 1972 American sitcom Sanford and Son. The scene is not shown on TV; Stewie and Brian sneak into the concert in the televised version.

As the monkey begins bonding with the family, including having a conversation about actress and comedian Sarah Silverman, Chris realizes how much he actually likes the monkey. Deciding to help Chris on his homework, the monkey scraps a lame attempt by Chris to write an essay about the 1951 novel The Catcher in the Rye by American author J. D. Salinger, and instead writes an A+ essay titled, "The Slave Trade Allegory of Curious George". The two then begin their own personal bonding, and eventually decide to go fishing, leading Chris to catch the comic book superhero Aquaman, before beating him to death and eating him.

In the conclusion of the episode, Miley Cyrus begins destroying downtown Quahog, causing the monkey to attempt to stop and reason with her. Not realizing that Stewie had unsuccessfully reprogrammed her, the monkey is then kidnapped, and taken to the top of a nearby skyscraper, in a parody of the 1933 film King Kong. Cyrus is then shot down by Quagmire and Peter while piloting a biplane, before the two rescue the monkey from certain death. After being shot during several passes, Miley's robotic skeleton is partially revealed, making her resemble a T-800 from "Terminator".

== Reception ==
In a slight improvement over the previous episode, the episode was viewed in 7.73 million homes in its original airing, according to Nielsen ratings, despite airing simultaneously with Sunday Night Football on NBC, The Amazing Race on CBS and Desperate Housewives on ABC. The episode also acquired a 4.0 rating in the 18–49 demographic, beating Seth & Alex's Almost-Live Comedy Show, The Cleveland Show and the Family Guy episode "Brian's Got a Brand New Bag", in addition to significantly edging out all three in total viewership.

Reviews of the episode from television critics were mostly mixed, who found it to be "a thorough examination of both Miley Cyrus and the evil monkey in Chris' closet", but, "things got ridiculous". Television critic Ahsan Haque of IGN gave the episode an 8.5 out of ten, and called it a "much better episode than "Brian's Got a Brand New Bag", with some clever sight gags, an annoyingly catchy musical number, and the revelation of the Evil Monkey's true reasons for hiding in Chris' closet". In a simultaneous review of all four MacFarlane programs, Emily VanDerWerff of The A.V. Club gave the episode a C− stating, "Turning Miley Cyrus into a Small Wonder parody was fitfully amusing, but the rest of the Hannah Montana material was ridiculously non-specific, filled with the kinds of jokes everyone made about Cyrus a few years ago." VanDerWerff praised the action sequence at the end of the episode, however, calling it "high quality stuff for the show". Jason Hughes of TV Squad stated of the Evil Monkey's role in the episode, "I don't think I ever wanted this character fully explored or seen by anyone else in the house ... The character lost some of its mystique and charm."
