= Friends Without Benefits =

- Family Guy episode
- Episode no.: Season 11; Episode 7
- Directed by: Jerry Langford
- Written by: Cherry Chevapravatdumrong
- Production code: AACX02
- Original air date: December 9, 2012

Guest appearances
- Chris Cox as Kent Lastname; Andrew Hibbard as Peter's Customer; Rachael MacFarlane; Martha MacIsaac as Patty; Natasha Melnick as Ruth; Christina Milian as Esther; Emily Osment as Quagmire's Asian Date; Robert Wu as Overzealous Asian Kids

Episode chronology
← Previous "Lois Comes Out of Her Shell"	Next → "Jesus, Mary and Joseph!"
- Family Guy season 11

"Friends Without Benefits" is the seventh episode of the eleventh season and the 195th overall episode of the animated comedy series Family Guy. It originally aired on Fox in the United States on December 9, 2012. It was written by Cherry Chevapravatdumrong and directed by Jerry Langford. In the episode, Meg gathers the courage to ask out a boy she has a crush on, but is devastated when she learns that he's gay and is attracted to her brother Chris.

== Plot ==
While at the cafeteria with her friends Patty, Esther, and Ruth, at school, Meg confides her infatuation with a popular boy at school, Kent Lastname (Chris Cox). Esther suggests that she ask Kent out, yet Meg admits that she fears certain rejection.

Meanwhile, the next morning, Brian and Stewie read Meg's diary, which confirms her long-term obsession with the boy. As Meg walks down the street, daydreaming about Kent, she causes Mayor Adam West to drive into a tree. She realizes that she can't go on without Kent, and successfully asks him out. When he turns up at the Griffins' house, Kent shows himself to be particularly friendly to Chris. After the date, Meg tries to kiss him. Kent however had no idea that Meg thought they were on a date and then reveals to Meg that he is gay. To add insult to injury, he admits that he has feelings for her brother, Chris.

In a small side plot, Stewie mishears Kent mentioning Meg's "brother" and believes Kent is interested in himself rather than Chris. The next day, Meg is in tears, and Brian is not able to avoid her by keeping silent as Peter and Lois are, so he reluctantly listens to her story about Kent. Questioning him further, she admits to Brian that Kent has feelings for Chris. Brian suggests Kent may be confused about his sexuality. However, at school the next day, Kent confirms that he's not confused and accepts himself as gay. Meg later tries to make herself Kent's beard, but he refuses and states that if she's going to be like this then they can't be friends.

As Kent pursues an oblivious Chris, Meg decides that if she can't have Kent, then Chris being with him is the next best thing. She asks Chris to sleep with Kent and naturally he refuses the request. Refusing to take "no" for an answer, Meg attempts to drug Chris into having sex with Kent. She tells Kent that Chris is gay and to come to Chris' room, with Chris "pretending" to be asleep, as he isn't "open about his sexuality". After Chris shows Meg a photo he has been keeping of the two of them for years, she decides not to drug Chris and instead pours the drug into a plant which falls over and is subsequently raped by another plant. However, she forgets to tell Kent and later that night, Kent shows up at Chris' room expecting a submissive Chris, but instead discovers Chris is straight. Chris confronts Meg, now forced to reveal her plan. Both boys are outraged and Kent, deeming Meg a complete psycho, angrily leaves and a seductive Stewie is left very mad, however he accidentally eats the drug after he mistakes it for candy and is raped by the plant as a result. Meg is unhappy as Kent hates her now and Brian talks to her about it, reassuring her that all it will take is one drunk man getting her pregnant and upon her refusal to have an abortion, she'll have trapped her mate for life. Stewie comes in stating that his bottom was affected by poison ivy not knowing he was raped.

== Reception ==
The episode received a 2.9 rating and was watched by a total of 5.64 million people, this made it the second most watched show on Animation Domination that night, beating The Cleveland Show and Bob's Burgers but losing to The Simpsons with 7.44 million. The episode was met with mixed reviews from critics. Kevin McFarland of The A.V. Club gave the episode a B.

Carter Dotson of TV Fanatic gave the episode two and a half stars out of five.
