= Jesus, Mary and Joseph! =

- Family Guy episode
- Episode no.: Season 11; Episode 8
- Directed by: Julius Wu
- Written by: Tom Devanney
- Production code: AACX07
- Original air date: December 23, 2012

Guest appearances
- Ellen Albertini Dow as Great Aunt Helen; Bruce McGill; Ryan Reynolds as Overweight Guy

Episode chronology
| ← Previous "Friends Without Benefits" | Next → "Space Cadet" |
- Family Guy season 11

"Jesus, Mary and Joseph!" is the eighth episode of the eleventh season of the animated comedy series Family Guy and the 196th overall episode. It originally aired on Fox in the United States on December 23, 2012. It was written by Tom Devanney and directed by Julius Wu.

The episode was postponed one week due to sensitive content in the wake of the Sandy Hook Elementary School shooting that took place two days before it was originally scheduled to air. It was replaced with a repeat of Grumpy Old Man, an episode in Season 10.

== Plot ==
As the Griffins prepare for Christmas by decorating their tree, Meg finds an ornament of the manger and Peter tells the story of Christmas. Joseph (played by Peter) and his friend Robby (played by Brian) spot Mary (played by Lois) in their village. Joseph introduces himself to her. They have many dates, but Joseph is annoyed by Mary's reluctance to have sex. Mary claims that she is destined for something special. Later, Mary tells Joseph that she has been visited by an angel (played by Bruce) who told her that God has blessed her with his child. Joseph accepts this. Taking a break from the story, Peter and the family call their Aunt Helen to wish her a merry Christmas. The call does not go well and Peter returns to the story.

On the way to Bethlehem on a mule (played by Meg), Joseph is skeptical about the baby. Elsewhere, three wise men (played by Glenn Quagmire, Cleveland Brown, and Joe Swanson) are inspired to travel to Bethlehem themselves. They stop at the palace of King Herod (played by Carter Pewterschmidt) for water and talk of their plans to see the Messiah. Herod decides to protect his title and win the love of Jodie Foster (a reference to John Hinckley Jr.) by killing the child. Mary and Joseph arrive at an inn, but the manager (played by Mort Goldman) denies them a room. Mary goes into labor, and the manager offers them space in a stable. Mary ponders what to call the new child. The angel takes her list of possible names to God, who is inspired to name the child "Jesus" after something the angel said.

The wise men, who are following a light in the sky, argue about the nature of the light; they think it might be an airplane. A doctor tells them of an earlier messiah who was not successful. The wise men arrive with their gifts as the savior is born. A drummer boy (played by Chris) joins them. King Herod arrives with his army and demands the child. Jesus (played by Stewie) transforms the manger into a fighter plane and destroys Herod's troops with it. After Peter finishes his story, a pregnant couple arrives at the door. They explain that their car broke down and they need help, but Peter, thinking that they're faking, gives them the cold shoulder and threatens to call the police. When they press their request for help, Peter goes to get his baseball bat.

== Reception ==
The episode received a 2.9 rating and was watched by a total of 5.49 million people, this made it the second most watched show on Animation Domination that night, beating American Dad! and a repeat of The Simpsons but losing to another repeat of The Simpsons with 5.54 million. The episode was met with mixed reviews from critics. Kevin McFarland of The A.V. Club gave the episode a C, saying "Family Guy never has that feeling of curiosity. It’s far too often bitter, malicious, and condescending to anyone it deems foolish enough to believe in something bigger. But other times—and “Jesus, Mary, and Joseph!” unfortunately falls into this category—it’s so toothless and scattered that it can barely muster the old venomous attitude toward religion."

Carter Dotson of TV Fanatic gave the episode three and a half stars out of five, saying "I was wondering if there was anything in particular that would cause this episode to be delayed a week after the Sandy Hook tragedy, and perhaps it was the fact that King Herod’s forces were trying to kill a baby that did it, though little else seemed particularly offensive. However, there were a lot of pauses and general delay tactics that might have served as ways to edit out other potentially-insensitive content. But otherwise, it just seems like it was just pushed back because Fox didn’t want to air something crass right after such a tragedy. Probably a good idea."
