= Turban Cowboy =

- Family Guy episode
- Episode no.: Season 11; Episode 16
- Directed by: Joe Vaux
- Written by: Artie Johann; Shawn Ries
- Production code: AACX13
- Original air date: March 17, 2013

Guest appearances
- Omid Abtahi as Mahmoud; Bob Costas as himself

Episode chronology
← Previous "Call Girl"	Next → "12 and a Half Angry Men"
- Family Guy season 11

"Turban Cowboy" is the sixteenth episode of the eleventh season and the 203rd overall episode of the animated comedy series Family Guy. It aired on Fox in the United States on March 17, 2013, and is written by Artie Johann and Shawn Ries and directed by Joe Vaux. The episode revolves around Peter befriending a Muslim named Mahmoud after getting injured in a skydiving accident. Their friendship comes to an abrupt end when Mahmoud is revealed to be a radical terrorist.

== Plot ==
As the guys hang out at The Drunken Clam, they decide to do something to shake up their boring lives. They take Peter up on his suggestion to take up skydiving. Peter is invigorated by their jump and keeps up skydiving despite Lois' concern, even as his jumps usually result in accidents. An accident in Las Vegas lands Peter in the hospital where he meets Mahmoud, a Muslim. He finds he gets along great with Mahmoud and back at the Clam, he has Mahmoud stop by to introduce him to the guys. They find he has nothing in common with them when he refuses to drink or look at other women. Mahmoud introduces Peter to Islamic culture and he becomes interested in becoming a Muslim. Lois has reservations as Peter starts studying Islam in-depth although she decides to let it pass. Mahmoud invites Peter to a Muslim get-together but finds himself unwittingly involved with terrorists intent on blowing up the Quahog Bridge.

When Peter drops that he is trying to act inauspicious, the guys begin to suspect that he is involved with terrorists. Peter realizes that he has been duped and wants to drop out but Joe convinces him to go along since he is already on the inside. As they go over the plan, Peter finds out that he will be driving the van but is caught when he reveals he is wearing a microphone. The guys hear as the bombing plan is rushed into action. Peter is held at gunpoint and forced to drive the explosives-laden van to the bridge. Peter tries to talk Mahmoud out of his plan but fails. Joe arrives in time to stop him and destroys the detonator by knocking it out of Mahmoud's hand. Mahmoud and the terrorist cell are all arrested. Joe thanks Peter for his involvement as Peter decides to call Horace to get their table ready. As he dials his cell phone, the bridge explodes and Peter forces everyone to run away.

== Reception ==
The episode received a 2.4 rating in the 18-49 demographic and was watched by a total of 4.92 million viewers. This made it the most watched show on Fox's Animation Domination line-up that night, beating The Simpsons, Bob's Burgers and The Cleveland Show. The episode received generally negative reviews from critics. Kevin McFarland of The A.V. Club gave the episode a D, saying, "'Turban Cowboy' feels like an episode made in 2002 and left on the shelf for a decade, completely unaware of just how uniformly Middle Eastern characters are depicted as terrorists. If only Joe and Quagmire had chosen Peter's suggestion that they rob a Mafia poker game, then maybe this would've been a Family Guy send-up of Killing Them Softly instead." Carter Dotson of TV Fanatic gave the episode 2-1/2 out of 5 stars, saying, "I don't expect Family Guy to be as revolutionary as its earlier days, when its humor went to shocking places yet still had a heart to it. Remember the outrage over the "When You Wish Upon a Weinstein" episode that was ultimately benign and surprisingly respectful to Judaism while still making joking references to the religion? It had a true sense of its perspective. Now it has little of the heart left to it, preferring to just be offensive, and the only people getting outraged by the show is the Parents Television Council. It's just a shame because I know this show can be better."

== Boston Marathon controversy and removal ==
The episode contains a cutaway gag showing Peter committing mass murder at the Boston Marathon by plowing his car through the runners. After the Boston Marathon bombing, which occurred about a month after the episode's air date, Fox promptly removed the "Turban Cowboy" episode from Fox.com, Amazon, and Hulu. The network also stated it had no immediate plans to broadcast the episode again. However, the episode was returned to Hulu in September 2022, leaving "Partial Terms of Endearment" (which never aired on American television and has only been made available on DVD) the only episode absent from the service.

A clip circulated on the Internet with the Boston Marathon scene edited together with another scene from the same episode showing remote detonations of bombs, to make it appear that Family Guy predicted or inspired the bombings. This was first put forth by conspiracy theorist and radio talk show host Alex Jones on his InfoWars website and on Twitter. Family Guy creator Seth MacFarlane tweeted to denounce the hoax, calling it "abhorrent". YouTube subsequently removed uploads of the clip from its service.

== See also ==
- "MyPods and Boomsticks"
- "The Snuke"
