= Brian's Play =

- Family Guy episode
- Episode no.: Season 11; Episode 10
- Directed by: Joseph Lee
- Written by: Gary Janetti
- Production code: AACX08
- Original air date: January 13, 2013

Guest appearances
- Alan Bennett as himself; Lucas Grabeel as Seymour Krelboyne; Jackson Rathbone as Stanley Kowalski

Episode chronology
← Previous "Space Cadet"	Next → "The Giggity Wife"
- Family Guy season 11

"Brian's Play" is the tenth episode of the eleventh season and the 198th overall episode of the animated comedy series Family Guy. It aired on Fox in the United States on January 13, 2013. It was written by Gary Janetti and directed by Joseph Lee. In the episode, Brian writes a play that becomes a hit in Quahog, but loses his confidence when he finds that the play Stewie wrote is better than his. But when Stewie sees how upset Brian is, he decides to make things right.

== Plot ==
Brian writes a play, titled A Passing Fancy, which is a hit in Quahog. Just as he lets his success go to his head, Stewie asks him to read a play he has written. Brian humors him and reads the play after a night of drinking and philosophical discussion with aspiring writers, but he realizes Stewie's play, titled An American Marriage, is much better than his. His confidence shaken, Brian tells Stewie the play is bad and attempts to destroy the script, but Stewie finds it buried in the yard. Angered, Stewie reveals that he knew Brian's work was inferior because it was easy for even Chris and Peter to follow the plot. Stewie claims that he has a creative voice when it comes to writing, while Brian uses overdone clichés and blatant plagiarism. Brian emotionally falls apart.

As Brian sinks into depression, Stewie spitefully says that his play is Broadway-bound and demands Brian escort him around New York. At a party for playwrights, Brian tries to ingratiate himself with big-name writers, but they tell him his play is the worst piece of writing they have ever seen. Outside, Stewie finds Brian even more depressed. Brian admits he knew Stewie's writing was better, but Brian still hoped that he could achieve success despite the fact that he will die much sooner than the rest of the family. Stewie says that this is Brian speaking in his own voice, and that he should write from his heart.

At the opening of Stewie's play, the crowd leaves unhappy, and Brian is confused as to why Stewie changed it. Stewie claims that he just “gave it a final polish", though he really wanted to make Brian happy again by sabotaging his own play. As they leave the theater, Stewie admires New York and professes a desire to live there one day. Then they are snatched by a pterodactyl.

== Reception ==
The episode received a 3.2 rating and was watched by a total of 6.01 million people, this made it the most watched show on Animation Domination that night beating The Cleveland Show, Bob's Burgers, American Dad! and The Simpsons. The episode was met with generally positive reviews from critics. Kevin McFarland of The A.V. Club gave the episode an A−, saying "This is Family Guy at its most self-aware—and more importantly, self aware in the right way, taking stock of its place in the world and remaining honest, something it hasn’t done in years. Business-as-usual cutaways add a little bit here and there, but for the most part the standard building blocks of Family Guy humor gets in the way of the introspective main plot." Carter Dotson of TV Fanatic gave the episode four out of five stars, saying "Yet I think because of the fact that the emotions were so complicated, that’s why it was hard to swallow. I certainly had trouble forming coherent thoughts on how to describe my thoughts on this episode, and still am not quite sure how I feel. Still, the fact that this series can pull off this trick of being more than just manatee jokes, I suppose I like being reminded of that fact more than perhaps what I actually watched, which I’m still not completely sure about my feelings on it, to be honest."
