= Yug Ylimaf =

- Family Guy episode
- Episode no.: Season 11; Episode 4
- Directed by: John Holmquist
- Written by: Mark Hentemann
- Production code: AACX04
- Original air date: November 11, 2012

Guest appearances
- Alexandra Breckenridge as Girl #1; Johnny Brennan as Mort Goldman; Lacey Chabert as Meg Griffin; Chris Cox as Ferris Bueller; Ginger Gonzaga as Cindy; Jonathan Morgan Heit as Boy; Tatum Hentemann as Girl Singing ABCs; Christine Lakin as Brain's Stutter Date; Rachael MacFarlane as Girl #2; Joshua Rush as Other Kid; Alec Sulkin as Interviewer; John Viener as Foreign Bar Guy

Episode chronology
← Previous "The Old Man and the Big 'C'"	Next → "Joe's Revenge"
- Family Guy season 11

"Yug Ylimaf" is the fourth episode of the eleventh season of the animated comedy series Family Guy. It originally aired on the Fox network in the United States on November 11, 2012. This was the 200th episode produced and was promoted as such but was the 192nd episode broadcast. In the episode, Brian uses Stewie's time machine to hook up with potential girlfriends but it goes awry when he causes time to run in reverse and has to find a way to fix that.

== Plot ==
When Brian attempts to score a date at a bar, he gets a girl to come to his house, claiming he has a time machine. They sneak into Stewie's room and use the time machine to travel to the assassination of Abraham Lincoln. Brian uses this tactic to score other dates, traveling to events such as the Hindenburg disaster and segregation-era America. However, when one of his dates points out the "years traveled" gauge on the time machine, Brian realizes Stewie might discover what he has been doing; to avoid this, he sets the "years traveled" gauge backward, which causes the time machine to have a complete meltdown and a bright blue light to emerge. Stewie wakes up to see this and Brian claims Meg is responsible, before an enormous energy blast blows Stewie and Brian against the wall, knocking them unconscious.

The next morning, the two awake to discover that Brian's tampering with the machine has caused time to run backward. Stewie and Brian go around town, examining the effects of the machine, witnessing events running backwards, such as a fight between Peter and Ernie the Giant Chicken (after Peter had opened his car door when Ernie crashed his bicycle into it). After noticing that Cleveland is back living in Quahog, it becomes apparent that reverse time is starting to accelerate. Even worse, when Stewie sees that he is un-teething, he realizes the reversed timeline is beginning to affect them as well, and they also relive the ipecac incident in reverse. When they see that Bonnie is pregnant and that Susie has been "unborn", Stewie realizes he too will be unborn if the time machine is not fixed.

While nearly completing the repairs of the time machine, Stewie suddenly loses the ability to walk and sees Meg's voice revert to Lacey Chabert; he realizes that the time of his birth is growing near (meaning that time had been rewinded back one year). When Stewie is taken to the hospital to be unborn, Brian is forced to fix the machine by himself. Trying to set the time forward again, he gets the idea to do the opposite of what he did the first time – he sets the time gauge forward, causing a second meltdown which again knocks him unconscious but keeps the machine intact. Brian wakes up to see that the timeline has been restored and rushes to the hospital just in time to witness Stewie's birth, and is inadvertently responsible for Stewie getting his name. Stewie thanks Brian for saving his life and the Griffins head home with their newborn baby. As the episode ends, Chris tells the family that he heard Stewie talk, which Lois dismisses.

== Reception ==
The episode received a 2.7 rating and was watched by a total of 5.57 million people. This made it the second most-watched show on Animation Domination that night, beating Bob's Burgers but losing to The Simpsons with 6.86 million. The episode was met with positive reviews from critics. Sonia Saraiya of The A.V. Club gave the episode a C, saying "Family Guy keeps delivering riffs on more of the same. It’s a cold product. I’m not saying it wasn’t fun while it lasted, but I’m more or less over it. And if this episode is any indication, it’s beginning to seem like Family Guy is over itself, too."

Carter Dotson of TV Fanatic gave the episode four out of five stars, saying "It feels like the writing is on point, with a focused story to tell, yet there's something different about the feel of it. These episodes may be gimmicky in a way, but there's a purpose behind them that drives them to be better. I'd love to see more of this. Not knowing what's next, and seeing the humor that comes out of when the show does something unexpected is just plain refreshing, and I’m glad to see that the show can still be really good... 200 episodes later."
