= The Giggity Wife =

12th episode of the 11th season of Family Guy

- Family Guy episode
- Episode no.: Season 11; Episode 11
- Directed by: Brian Iles
- Written by: Andrew Goldberg
- Production code: AACX09
- Original air date: January 27, 2013

Guest appearances
- Megan Hilty as Hellen Keller's Teacher, Old Woman; Sofía Vergara as Flower Saleswoman, Hispanic Woman; Mae Whitman as Soap Opera Girl

Episode chronology
← Previous "Brian's Play"	Next → "Valentine's Day in Quahog"
- Family Guy season 11

"The Giggity Wife" is the 11th episode of the eleventh season and the 199th overall episode of the animated comedy series Family Guy. It aired on Fox in the United States on January 27, 2013. It was written by Andrew Goldberg and directed by Brian Iles. The title of this episode is a reference of the CBS drama The Good Wife.

The episode's plot concerns Glenn Quagmire accidentally becoming the husband of a prostitute. He then tries to bring the marriage to an end by pretending to be gay.

== Plot ==
When Peter discovers Joe has a student ID he took from a kid that gave him lip, Peter, Quagmire and Joe visit the Harvard University campus for lunch and have a wild night on the town. A drunken Quagmire accidentally marries an elderly prostitute named Charmese, who refuses to let go of their relationship and Quagmire starts to consider a divorce until Joe points out that he could lose everything. Quagmire tries to make the best of it but Charmese can't pull herself far enough out of the gutter for his tastes.

Charmese said she has not had 2 weeks period of not having sex, since she was last in coma for 6 weeks. She worked in her profession for the last 40 years.

When Quagmire is reluctant to pursue their relationship, Charmese questions if he's homosexual and when she says the marriage would be over if true, Quagmire pretends to be homosexual. After catching Quagmire watching straight pornography, Charmese calls off the divorce unless Quagmire can prove he's homosexual by having sex with a man. Quagmire approaches Peter with the idea. Peter agrees but insists they have a date first, through which Quagmire suffers. Back at Quagmire's house, Charmese insists they have sex and the men clumsily, reluctantly prepare. Just as they are about to have sex, Charmese calls off the charade, noting that they're clearly heterosexual but if Quagmire wants a divorce that badly, she'll grant him one. She then says that he treats her better than any other guy she's met, and doesn't want to feel like she's burdening her marriage partner. After Charmese leaves, a nearly nude Peter and Quagmire embrace in relief as Peter suddenly noted the camera on Quagmire's laptop is on. The scene then cuts to the Griffin home, with the family watching in horror while Stewie comes in and asks if they're watching Glee.

== Reception ==
The episode received a 2.9 rating and was watched by a total of 5.63 million people, this made it the most watched show on Animation Domination that night beating The Cleveland Show, Bob's Burgers, American Dad! and The Simpsons. The episode was met with mixed reviews from critics. Kevin McFarland of The A.V. Club gave the episode a C−. Carter Dotson of TV Fanatic gave the episode two out of five stars.
