= Call Girl (Family Guy) =

- Family Guy episode
- Episode no.: Season 11; Episode 14
- Directed by: John Holmquist
- Written by: Wellesley Wild
- Production code: AACX12
- Original air date: March 10, 2013

Guest appearances
- Christine Baranski as herself; Robert Loggia as himself (live-action sequence); Giovanni Ribisi as Randy; Jill Talley as Kelly Ripa

Episode chronology
← Previous "Chris Cross"	Next → "Turban Cowboy"
- Family Guy season 11

"Call Girl" is the fifteenth episode of the eleventh season and the 202nd overall episode of the animated comedy series Family Guy. It aired on Fox in the United States on March 10, 2013. It was written by Wellesley Wild and directed by John Holmquist. In the episode, when Peter loses everything in a lawsuit, Lois gets a job. She starts working on a phone sex line, and ends up with Peter as a client.

== Plot ==
Chris builds a birdhouse he built based on an episode of Benson and Peter becomes interested in attracting birds. Chris wants the birds to reenact the Benson episode "Conflict of Interest." A falcon sweeps in and snatches the smaller birds. Peter decides to become a falconer. He acquires a falcon, which he names Xerxes and trains to fetch him things. As Peter sets off to take Xerxes to the park, they spot a couple on a motorcycle with a sidecar, and uses Xerxes to hijack the motorcycle and steal it. He ends up losing everything, including Xerxes, when the motorcycle owner files a lawsuit against him.

Lois berates him for losing everything, and is forced to get a job. Waiting at the employment agency, a man named Randy offers her voice work. She believes she will be appearing on television and in movies, but when she gets to the office, she finds it is a phone sex operation. Despite her reservations, she is lured by the money and decides to give it a try. She finds herself answering calls for most of the men in town and returns home exhausted and not in the mood for sex.

At the Drunken Clam, Peter complains to Joe and Quagmire about not having sex. Quagmire gives him the number for his favorite phone sex service. Later at home, Peter calls the line. Lois answers and quickly figures out that it is Peter. She entertains him, and he becomes attracted to her voice without realizing who it is. Later, Lois asks about his day and tries to get some thoughts out of him about his experience. Peter calls the sex line again later and asks for a date. Lois objects because he is married, but begrudgingly agrees, and later confides in her friend Bonnie.

At the Drunken Clam, Peter tells Joe and Quagmire about wanting to meet his phone sex woman, and the guys warn him against it. Peter wants to go through with it regardless. Lois sees Peter dressed up to go out. He makes up a story about going out of town, leaving Lois depressed and angry. She dresses up too, but disguised, and goes out to meet Peter. Peter opens up to her, not knowing it is Lois, and goes ahead and has sex with her, still unaware of who she is. Eight hours later, an angry Lois reveals the truth. Despite being shocked and appalled that Lois was doing phone sex, Peter admits that he somehow did know it was Lois on the phone, which proves to him that they were true soul-mates and he really did love her. He admits he ran up a phone bill of $7,000. Peter and Lois completely gross out Chris and Meg with their show of affection. However, Stewie watches Peter and Lois having sex and asks if they can have a threesome.

== Reception ==
The episode received a 2.7 rating in the 18-49 demographic and was watched by a total of 5.27 million viewers. This made it the most watched show on Fox's Animation Domination line-up that night, beating The Simpsons, American Dad!, Bob's Burgers and The Cleveland Show. The episode was met with polarized reviews from critics. Kevin McFarland of The A.V. Club gave the episode a C−, saying "'Call Girl' is all the more disappointing because every wrong step with the phone sex plot underscores that there’s a potentially great episode somewhere in there, but it requires changing most of the main plot and the unearned thematic resolution. I would’ve watched “Peter And The Sidecar Falcon” more than once, but as presently constituted, I can't wait to forget the last 15 minutes of this episode." Mark Trammell at TV Equals said, "A pretty good episode on the whole. The stuff I liked, I liked a lot, and it was certainly enough to recommend the episode on the whole. Maybe it wasn’t an all-time classic, but it was one of the more solid episodes this season." Carter Dotson of TV Fanatic gave the episode three and a half stars out of five, saying "The situation at least was surprisingly complex for the series, and left a better taste in my mouth than some of this season's episodes, which have just featured an unrelenting misanthropic darkness at times without any of the redeeming qualities that this one had. Having something to think about is welcome!"
