= 12 and a Half Angry Men =

- Family Guy episode
- Episode no.: Season 11; Episode 17
- Directed by: Pete Michels
- Written by: Ted Jessup
- Production code: AACX14
- Original air date: March 24, 2013

Guest appearances
- Max Charles as Timmy; Christine Lakin as Joyce Kinney; Padma Lakshmi as herself; Phil LaMarr as Judge Dignified Q. Blackman; Johann Urb as The Ambassador; Robert Wu; Uncredited: Emily Osment as Female Hockey Player (deleted scenes)

Episode chronology
← Previous "Turban Cowboy"	Next → "Bigfat"
- Family Guy season 11

"12 and a Half Angry Men" is the sixteenth episode of the eleventh season and the 204th overall episode of the animated comedy series Family Guy. It aired on Fox in the United States on March 24, 2013, and is written by Ted Jessup and directed by Pete Michels. In the episode, Mayor Adam West is put on trial for murder. Brian Griffin is on the jury and tries to clear his name. The episode was inspired by the classic 1957 film 12 Angry Men.

== Plot ==
When an aide to Mayor Adam West is found stabbed to death, evidence that the victim attempted to blackmail the Mayor suggests the Mayor as a suspect, and he is put on trial for murder. The jury selected for the trial consists of Peter, Brian, Quagmire, Mort Goldman, Tom Tucker, Herbert, Carter, Dr. Hartman, Seamus, Bruce, Carl, and Consuela. Brian is the only one voting "not guilty" and he tries to persuade his fellow jurors that there is a reasonable doubt of the Mayor's guilt. His insistence frustrates the others who do not trust the Mayor because he is a politician. Brian's examination of the evidence leads him to notice the paper on which the blackmail note was written matches a love letter he received from Quagmire's transgender father after they had sex. Since the paper was from the Marriot, and not from the Mayor's office to which the victim had access, Brian implied this means Mayor West was framed. Brian agrees that if no one is convinced of the possibility of the Mayor's innocence then he will change his vote, but the vote comes up with an agreement from Herbert that there is a chance of innocence. The other jurors just want to go home. Bruce calls for a break and Quagmire berates Brian for not going along when he had the chance.

Back in the jury room, Brian questions the witness's testimony of seeing the crime during an orgy in a neighboring house. Quagmire tries to prove that it could really happen but finds that Brian may be on to something when his demonstration proves that the witness's position could not have allowed her to look out a window during the orgy. The jury finds itself deadlocked at 6-6 and Tom Tucker still holds out for a guilty verdict, due to being a bigot towards people without mustaches, until Dr. Hartman convinces him otherwise. Peter changes his vote after he finds out what "guilty" means. Later, with Carter as the lone holdout for a guilty verdict, Brian challenges his thought until Carter reveals that he felt betrayed by the Mayor, for he always endorsed West yet was not allowed to sink most of Quahog in order to further his real estate developing plans. Carter breaks down into tears and gives in on his guilty vote. Acquitted of the crime, Mayor West resumes his duties. Back at the Griffin home, Stewie is unsatisfied that they merely proved Mayor West was innocent; he reveals that more murders have occurred, proving that the true murderer still on the loose is indeed a maniac. The lights go out, prompting Stewie to say, "And we're dead."

== Reception ==
The episode received a 2.6 rating in the 18-49 demographic and was watched by a total of 5.16 million viewers. This made it the most watched show on Fox's Animation Domination line-up that night, beating The Simpsons, Bob's Burgers and The Cleveland Show. The episode was met with mixed reviews from critics. Kevin McFarland of The A.V. Club gave the episode a B−, saying "Every beat of the 12 Angry Men homage shows up exactly when it should, but that reliability doesn't come off as lazy, since at least some work has to go into creating all the little twists, and whoever's responsible for Quagmire's orgy recreation certainly had a bit of time on their hands." Mark Trammell of TV Equals wrote, "I don't know if I can truthfully say that '12 and a Half Angry Men' worked entirely, but it wasn't an embarrassment, either, I suppose."
