= Space Cadet (Family Guy) =

- Family Guy episode
- Episode no.: Season 11; Episode 9
- Directed by: Pete Michels
- Written by: Alex Carter
- Production code: AACX06
- Original air date: January 6, 2013

Guest appearances
- Gary Cole as Principal Shepherd; Nicole Sullivan as Female Fake Friend#2/Call Talking Women (Deleted Scenes); Fred Tatasciore as Asian Executive; Brian Williams as himself; Uncredited in Deleted Scenes: John O'Hurley as Zardan; Mae Whitman as Astronaut's Date

Episode chronology
← Previous "Jesus, Mary and Joseph!"	Next → "Brian's Play"
- Family Guy season 11

"Space Cadet" is the ninth episode of the eleventh season and the 197th overall episode of the animated comedy series Family Guy. It aired on Fox in the United States on January 6, 2013. It was written by Alex Carter and directed by Pete Michels. In the episode, after Chris gets sent to space camp, he realizes that it is more than he can handle and asks to come home. But while the Griffins are there to get him, they look inside a space shuttle, and Stewie launches them into space.

== Plot ==
The Griffins find out that Chris is not doing well in school and worries about his future. As they discuss him, he overhears and feels insulted when they do not believe he is smart. To boost Chris' self-esteem, Peter and Lois allow him to go to a camp of his choosing; determined to show he's not stupid, he picks a space camp with NASA. However, Chris has trouble fitting in and calls for his parents to come pick him up. When the Griffins arrive, Chris gives them a tour of the space shuttle before they leave and Stewie accidentally launches them into space. As they worry about being stuck in space, Chris thinks he is responsible for getting them stuck. As word spreads about their possible fate, the Griffins explore the shuttle. Mission Control radios that they can get them back but the signal is lost and Peter destroys the radio trying to fix it. They try to land the shuttle themselves and Chris slows down the shuttle using what he learned in space camp. Unfortunately, the shuttle spins out of control, but Chris manages to stabilize it by allowing the autopilot to engage. They land to the cheers of the center and Chris is proclaimed a hero for saving his family.

== Reception ==
The episode received a 3.6 rating and was watched by a total of 7.26 million people, this made it the second most watched show on Animation Domination that night, beating Bob's Burgers and American Dad! but losing to The Simpsons with 8.97 million. The episode was met with mixed reviews from critics. Kevin McFarland of The A.V. Club gave the episode a B−, saying "'Space Cadet' actually ends up being a particularly appropriate title for a Family Guy episode that devolves into one too many cutaways, completely unfocused and oblivious to the compelling emotional plotline it sets in motion." Carter Dotson of TV Fanatic gave the episode three out of five stars, saying "Still, despite the surprisingly intelligent funny moments, this one just felt kind of off-kilter at times. It was occasionally amusing, but rarely ever made me laugh out loud, and the moral of Chris not being so stupid after all could be seen coming from a mile away. Also, Brian Williams was tragically underused in his cameo. You get a man with that kind of comedic timing, you gotta use him to his full abilities! Sadly, much like this episode, the execution just really wasn’t there."

== Cultural references ==
- The episode starts with a slightly modified opening sequence from Monty Python's Flying Circus, featuring the "It's" man.
- When Peter and Lois visit Principal Shepherd about Chris' recent activities, he shows Peter a picture Chris claimed to have drawn of Bob Belcher from Bob's Burgers.
- Peter's TV hypnotizes him into constantly talking about Breaking Bad and The Wire.
- In a cutaway, Peter and Lois are hanging on the wall in the style of Big Mouth Billy Bass as an older Chris claps and they sing the Blue Swede version of “Hooked On a Feeling.”
- After breaking the communication system, Peter tells the family to enter "Up, Up, Down, Down, Left, Right, Left, Right, B, A, Start" to gain unlimited lives. This is a reference to the Konami Code.
