= Alex Borstein: Corsets & Clown Suits =

- Directed by: Scott Ellis
- Written by: Alex Borstein
- Produced by: Sal Carino; Matthew Shapiro
- Starring: Alex Borstein
- Cinematography: M. David Mullen
- Edited by: Zana Bochar; Tim Streeto
- Production company: Amazon Studios
- Distributed by: Prime Video
- Release date: April 18, 2023
- Running time: 81 minutes
- Country: United States
- Language: English

Alex Borstein: Corsets & Clown Suits is a musical comedy special starring Alex Borstein, and directed by Scott Ellis. It was released on Prime Video on April 18, 2023.

== Summary ==
Alex Borstein performs a musical comedy special at The Wolford Theatre, the fictional burlesque club from The Marvelous Mrs. Maisel (a TV series in which Borstein stars). The special features musicians Salvador Rey and Eric Mills. Borstein discusses her attempts at dating as a divorced mother of two, and describes the special as "a filthy TED Talk."

== Production ==
The special is produced by Amazon Studios, with Borstein, Dhana Rivera Gilbert and Scott Ellis as executive producers, and Sal Carino and Matthew Shapiro as producers.

== Release ==
The special was released on Prime Video on April 18, 2023.
