= Lois Comes Out of Her Shell =

- Family Guy episode
- Episode no.: Season 11; Episode 7
- Directed by: Joe Vaux
- Written by: Danny Smith
- Production code: AACX05
- Original air date: November 25, 2012

Guest appearances
- Max Charles as Kid; Chris Cox; Johnny Depp as Edward Scissorhands; Sara Fletcher as Lois' New Friend #1; Hunter Gomez as Justin Bieber; Fiona Gubelmann as Lois' New Friend #2; Fred Tatasciore; Uncredited: Maurice LaMarche as Franklin D. Roosevelt (deleted scenes)

Episode chronology
| ← Previous "Joe's Revenge" | Next → "Friends Without Benefits" |
- Family Guy season 11

"Lois Comes Out of Her Shell" is the seventh episode of the eleventh season and the 195th episode overall of the animated comedy series Family Guy. It originally aired on Fox in the United States on November 25, 2012. It was written by Danny Smith and directed by Joe Vaux. In the episode, Lois has a midlife crisis leaving Peter desperately trying to keep up with her. Meanwhile, Stewie adopts a turtle from the park, but the turtle is determined to kill Stewie.

== Plot ==
Lois is not looking forward to her 43rd birthday due to age insecurity, but Brian suggests throwing her a surprise party. After Peter reads a poem that lowers Lois’s spirits even further, she begins to suffer a midlife crisis and decides to turn her life around by adopting a younger lifestyle, including longer hair, after a makeover and shopping trip. Lois’s new lifestyle causes conflict for Peter, who is unsure about the changes but enjoys aspects of her new persona. However, her behavior soon begins to wear on him. When Peter becomes tired at a party, he dampens Lois’s mood, prompting her to leave and party with younger women instead.

Back home, Brian points out to Peter that Lois is behaving this way because of the poem he read to her. A television report about Justin Bieber later shows Lois spending time with the teenage girls. Lois sneaks into the concert intending to seduce Bieber, but Peter interrupts and beats him up. When Peter demands that Lois come home and act her age, she refuses, citing his earlier comments. Peter apologizes and admits that he loves Lois for who she is. When Bieber is called back onstage, Peter is forced to substitute "Conway Bieber".

Meanwhile, Stewie finds a turtle in a pond at a park and takes him home as a pet, naming him Sheldon. Sheldon seeks revenge for being removed from his natural environment by attempting to ruin Stewie’s life. After several close encounters, Stewie grows suspicious. Sheldon’s revenge plot is revealed late one night, and Stewie flushes him down the toilet. When Sheldon survives and returns for further revenge, Stewie discovers Rupert’s head and a stranger’s head in boxes and vows to get even with him. Sheldon later bursts into Stewie’s room for a final confrontation. Stewie nearly loses the fight until Mario appears, jumps on Sheldon, and kills him, explaining to Stewie that although his life of jumping on turtles is no longer exciting, it is something he must continue doing.

== Reception ==
The episode received a 2.9 rating and was watched by a total of 5.77 million people, making it the second most watched show on Animation Domination that night, beating The Cleveland Show and Bob's Burgers but losing to The Simpsons with 7.46 million. The episode was met with mixed reviews from critics. Kevin McFarland of The A.V. Club gave the episode a B−, reviewing it as having telegraphed plot developments and typical sitcom themes, but nonetheless superior to previous episodes' lack of structure and joke execution. Carter Dotson of TV Fanatic gave the episode three and a half stars out of five, commenting positively on the coherence of the plot and the Conway Bieber gag, but with "some misgivings about just how genuine this episode’s newfound heart was."
