= Alex Borstein =

American actress (born 1971)

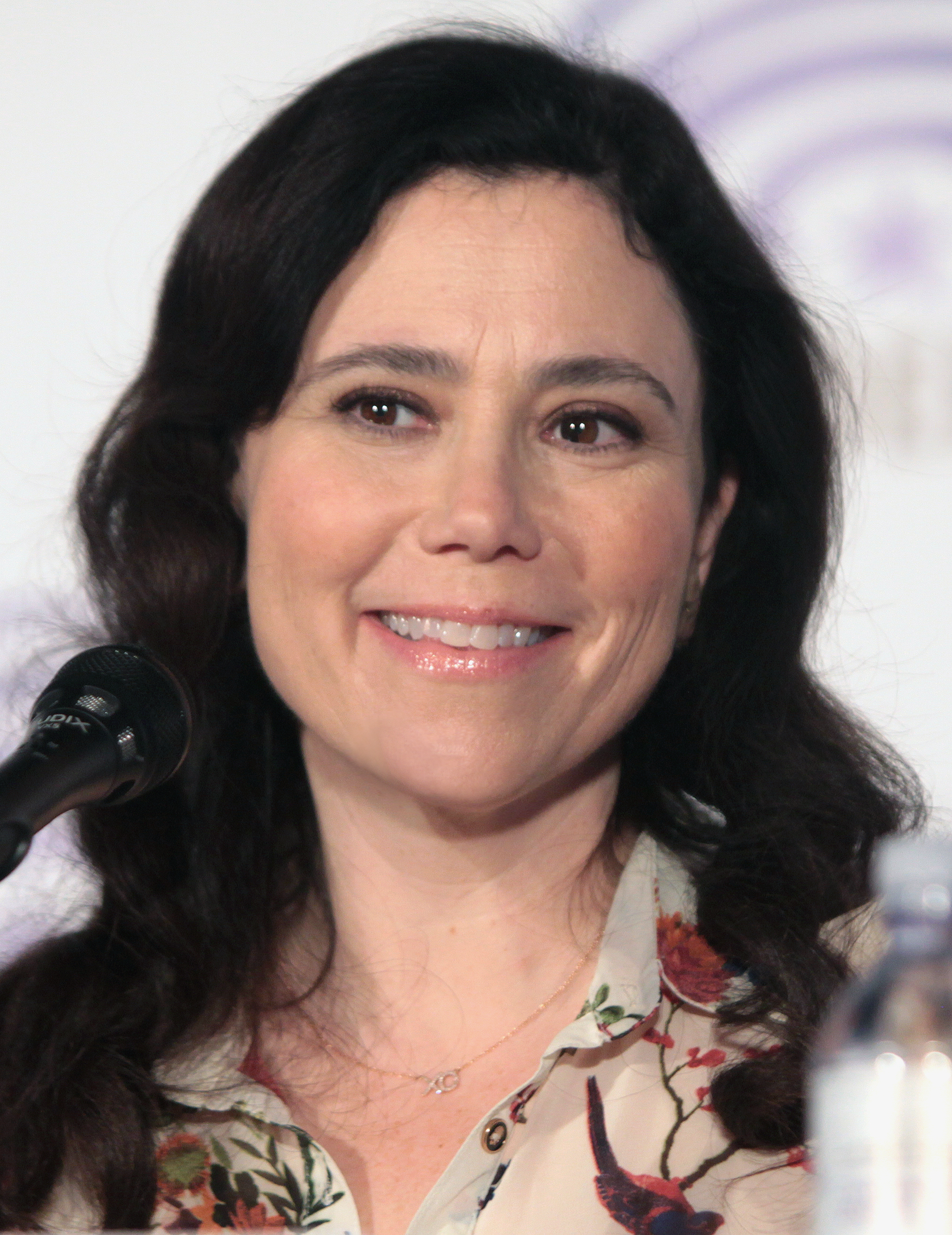
- Borstein at the 2016 WonderCon
- Born: Alexandrea Borstein; February 15, 1971 (age 55); Highland Park, Illinois, U.S.
- Education: San Francisco State University (BA)
- Occupations: Actress; comedian; writer; producer
- Years active: 1993–present
- Spouse: Jackson Douglas (m. 1999; div. 2017)
- Children: 2

Alexandrea Borstein (born February 15, 1971) is an American actress, comedian, writer, and producer best known as the voice of Lois Griffin in Family Guy, for which she won a Primetime Emmy Award, and Susie Myerson in The Marvelous Mrs. Maisel (2017–2023), which won her two Primetime Emmy Awards.

Borstein also had lead roles as various characters on the sketch comedy series MADtv (1997–2009) and as Dawn Forchette in the medical comedy series Getting On (2013–2015). She had supporting roles in numerous films, including Showtime (2002), Bad Santa (2003), Kicking & Screaming (2005), Little Man (2006), Killers (2010), Ted (2012), A Million Ways to Die in the West (2014), Love the Coopers (2015), and The Bad Guys (2022) as well as its sequel (2025).

== Early life ==
Borstein was born on February 15, 1971 in Highland Park, Illinois to a Jewish family. Her parents, Irving and Judy (Grünfeld) Borstein, are both mental health professionals. She has two older brothers.

Her father is from Atlanta and comes from an Orthodox Jewish family of Polish immigrants, Paul and Bessie (Kaufman) Borstein. She has stated her father’s family is also of Russian descent. Her mother, Judy, and maternal grandmother, Vera Winternitz, are Holocaust survivors, born and raised in Budapest, Hungary. They immigrated to the United States after the Hungarian Revolution of 1956. Borstein has described distant Hungarian-Mongolian ancestry.

Borstein was raised in Deerfield, Illinois, before her family moved to Northridge, California, a city of Los Angeles. She graduated from Chatsworth High School in 1989, and San Francisco State University, where she studied rhetoric.

== Career ==
=== 1993–1998: Career beginnings and MADtv ===
Borstein trained in improvisational comedy at the ACME Comedy Theater, near Hollywood, where she met her writing partner and future husband Jackson Douglas. Shortly after they began working together on the animated series The Spooktacular New Adventures of Casper and Pinky and the Brain, Borstein left her position at an ad agency – where she had written print ads for Barbie – to become a full-time writer. In 1996, while still writing for Casper, Borstein worked on the show Power Rangers Zeo as the voice of Queen Machina, the queen of the Machine Empire.

In 1997, Borstein became a cast member on the third season of the sketch comedy show MADtv after being discovered by a casting agent while performing with the ACME Comedy Theater troupe at the Big Stinkin' International Improv & Sketch Comedy Festival in Austin, Texas.

Borstein was best known on MADtv for her character Ms. Swan (owner of the Gorgeous Pretty Beauty Nail Salon); her other recurring characters included Eracist Anne, "Stick Chick" Echo, singer Jasmine Wayne-Wayne, child prodigy Karen Goddard, lounge singer Shaunda, News at Six outside-the-studio reporter Sue Napersville, and Cordo the GAP troll. When Seth Green made recurring appearances on the show as mean boss Mr. Brightling, Borstein would play his mother, Mama Brightling.

=== 1999–present: Further success and Family Guy ===
While working on MADtv, Borstein met Seth MacFarlane, who was then preparing to launch the animated sitcom Family Guy on Fox. MacFarlane was originally supposed to create animated shorts for MADtv but declined in favor of creating an independent series. MacFarlane cast Borstein as the voice of character Lois Griffin, where incidentally, she yet again played the mother of Seth Green, who voiced Chris Griffin. After the show's debut in January 1999, Family Guy was cancelled by the network twice in 2000 and 2002, the latter year the same year she left MADtv after five years at the end of Season 7 (2001-2002 season). Family Guy eventually returned after its subsequent cancellation three years later in 2005. As well as her role as the voice performer for Lois and several other characters (including a brief appearance as Ms. Swan in a 2005 episode), she is also a producer and staff writer. She was nominated for a Primetime Emmy Award for Outstanding Voice-Over Performance for the episode "Lois Comes Out of Her Shell" in 2013.

In 2000, Borstein was cast as Sookie St. James in the WB drama Gilmore Girls. She portrayed Sookie in the pilot but her MADtv contract prevented her from continuing in the role. Borstein made recurring appearances on Gilmore Girls throughout the show's run, first as the harpist Drella and later as the stylist Miss Celine.

As a film actor, she played Ms. Ungermeyer the school principal in The Lizzie McGuire Movie (2003), the best friend of Halle Berry's character in Catwoman (2004), and an employee at CBS News in Good Night, and Good Luck (2005). She also had a small role in the movie Bad Santa (2003) and an uncredited cameo as an obnoxious coffee shop patron in the Will Ferrell movie Kicking & Screaming (2005). On some commercials, she sometimes voices Olive Oyl from Popeye and Betty Boop.

Borstein was a co-host of GSN's Celebrity Blackjack in 2004. She made at least three guest appearances, once as Lois Griffin, on the Comedy Central animated program Drawn Together.

Borstein was cast as a press secretary in the 2007 sitcom pilot The Thick of It, but the series was not picked up for broadcast. She was seen in the 2009 comedy For Christ's Sake, which was directed by her then-husband Jackson Douglas.

Borstein's production company is called Crackerpants, Inc. In 2007, it released the DVD Drop Dead Gorgeous (in a Down-to-Earth Bombshell Sort of Way), a recording of a live performance at the Alex Theatre with Teddy Towne as the opening act. The title comes from one of many female character breakdowns Borstein reads from to illustrate sexism in the industry.

=== 2010–present: Getting On and The Marvelous Mrs. Maisel ===
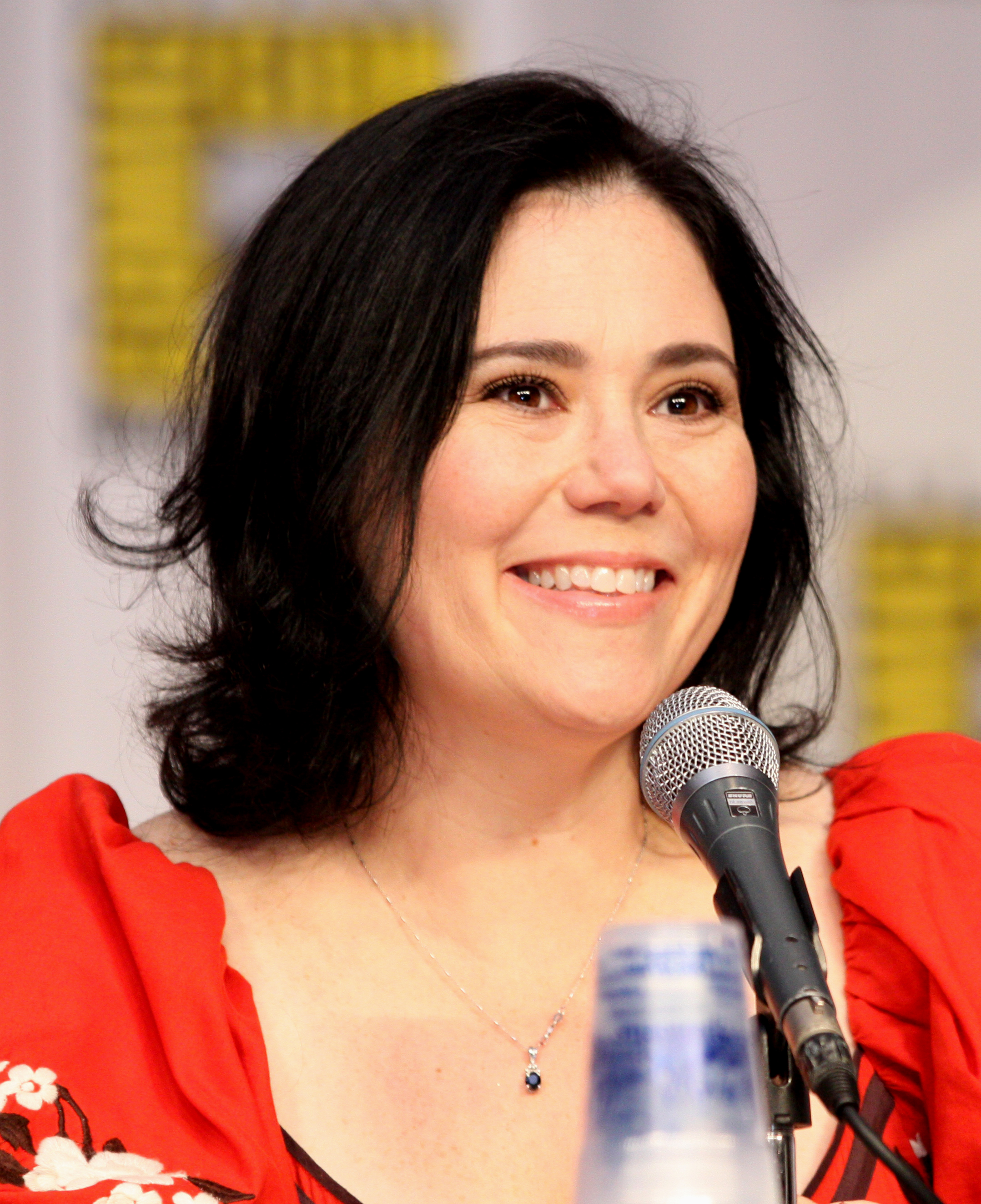
Borstein at the 2010 San Diego Comic-Con

Borstein has made several supporting appearances in such comedic films as Killers (2010), Dinner for Schmucks (2010), Ted (2012), ParaNorman (2012), A Million Ways to Die in the West (2014), The Angry Birds Movie (2016), and The Bad Guys (2022).

In 2010, Borstein joined the first season staff of the Showtime comedy-drama series Shameless, as a writer and supervising producer. In its second season, she held the position of writer and consulting producer. She also guest-starred as Lou Deckner in numerous episodes of the series, beginning in the first-season episode "But at Last Came a Knock."

She also appeared as a comedian contestant on IFC's short-lived comedy-driven game show Bunk in 2012.

Borstein starred as Dawn Forchette on the HBO comedy series Getting On, which is a remake of a British series with the same name. The series has gained positive reviews and earned multiple Primetime Emmy Award nominations. It aired from 2013 to 2015.

From 2017 to 2023, Borstein starred as Susie Myerson in the Amazon Prime Video historical comedy-drama series The Marvelous Mrs. Maisel, for which she received significant critical acclaim and won two Primetime Emmy Awards for Outstanding Supporting Actress in a Comedy Series.

== Personal life ==
Borstein met actor and writer Jackson Douglas while she was studying improv at the ACME Comedy Theatre. Douglas proposed to her during the taping of a MADtv sketch and they were married in 1999. Douglas filed for divorce in October 2014 and it was finalized in 2017. Borstein and Douglas have a son and a daughter.

Borstein, who is a carrier of hemophilia herself, is a longtime advocate for the National Hemophilia Foundation.

=== Religious beliefs ===
According to Borstein, "We do Shabbat every Friday night. I'm not [someone] that goes to temple all the time—I'm a High Holidays temple goer, and that's about it. But there are traditions", she said in an interview. "Having a mother and a grandmother who are Holocaust survivors, I feel a large responsibility to continue that culture and those traditions—not necessarily the dogma, but what it feels like to be Jewish. I want to instill that in my kids."

== Filmography ==
=== Film ===
Year	Title	Role	Notes
2000	Coyote Ugly	Bidding Auction Woman	Uncredited
2002	Dawg	Darcy Smits	
2002	Showtime	Casting Director	
2003	The Lizzie McGuire Movie	Miss Ungermeyer	
2003	Bad Santa	Milwaukee Mom	
2004	Seeing Other People	Tracy	
2004	Catwoman	Sally	
2004	Billy's Dad Is a Fudge-Packer!	Betty Henderson	Short film
2005	Kicking & Screaming	Obnoxious Hummer Lady	Uncredited
2005	Stewie Griffin: The Untold Story	Lois Griffin / Various voices	Direct-to-video; Also writer and co-producer
2005	Good Night, and Good Luck	Natalie	
2006	Little Man	Janet	
2007	The Lookout	Mrs. Lange	
2010	Killers	Lily Bailey	
2010	Dinner for Schmucks	Martha	
2010	For Christ's Sake	Mrs. Marcus	
2012	Ted	Helen Bennett	
2012	ParaNorman	Mrs. Henscher (voice)	
2014	A Million Ways to Die in the West	Millie	
2015	Love the Coopers	Angie	
2016	The Angry Birds Movie	Sophie Bird / Peggy Bird (voice)	
2021	Extinct	Mali (voice)	
2022	The Bad Guys	Chief Misty Luggins (voice)	
2025	The Bad Guys 2	Commissioner Misty Luggins (voice)	

=== Television ===
Year	Title	Role	Notes
1993–1994	Mighty Morphin Power Rangers	Various voices	4 episodes
1996	Power Rangers Zeo	Queen Machina / Robocupid (voice)	42 episodes
1996	Big Bad Beetleborgs	Cataclaws (voice)	Episode: "Yo Ho Borgs"
1997–2009, 2016	MADtv	Herself / Various characters	Main role; 134 episodes Also writer
1999–present	Family Guy	Lois Griffin / Barbara Pewterschmidt / Tricia Takanawa (1999–2021) / Various voices	Main role; 424 episodes Also writer and producer
2000–2005	Gilmore Girls	Drella / Miss Celine / Doris	9 episodes
2002	Titus	Nicky	Episode: "Bachelor Party"
2002–2003	3-South	Becky (voice)	3 episodes
2003	Friends	Bitter Woman on Stage	Episode: "The One with the Soap Opera Party"
2003	Frasier	Evelyn	Episode: "Farewell, Nervosa"
2005–2022	Robot Chicken	Various voices	16 episodes
2006–2016	American Dad!	Doctor Gupta / Museum Curator (voice)	Episodes: "Roger 'n' Me" and "Garfield and Friends"
2006	Drawn Together	Lois Griffin / Various voices	Episodes: "A Tale of Two Cows" and "The Lemon AIDS Walk"
2007–2009	Slacker Cats	Latoyah (voice)	10 episodes
2009–2013	The Cleveland Show	Hadassah Lowenstein / Lois Griffin / Various voices	17 episodes
2009	Glenn Martin, DDS	Clerk (voice)	Episode: "Deck the Malls"
2011–2015	Shameless	Lou Deckner	5 episodes; also writer and consulting producer
2011	Night of the Hurricane	Lois Griffin (voice)	Television special
2012	Hot in Cleveland	Preshi	Episode: "Rubber Ball"
2012	Robot Chicken DC Comics Special	Wonder Woman / Giganta / Woman at Bar (voice)	Television special
2012–2016	Workaholics	Colleen Walker	3 episodes
2012–2013	Bunheads	Sweetie Cramer / Hooker	Episodes: "Pilot" and "Channing Tatum Is a Fine Actor"
2013–2015	Getting On	Dawn Forchette	Main role; 18 episodes
2014	Robot Chicken DC Comics Special 2: Villains in Paradise	Wonder Woman (voice)	Television special
2015	Life in Pieces	Lynette	Episode: "Ponzi Sex Paris Bounce"
2015	Masters of Sex	Loretta	Episode: "Monkey Business"
2015	Robot Chicken DC Comics Special III: Magical Friendship	Wonder Woman (voice)	Television special
2016	Bordertown	Janice Buckwald / Becky (voice)	Main role; 12 episodes
2016	Gilmore Girls: A Year in the Life	Drella / Miss Celine	Episodes: "Winter" and "Fall"
2016	Son of Zorn	Elizabeth	Episode: "Return of the Drinking Buddy"
2017	Animals.	Lois Griffin (voice)	Episode: "Pigeons."
2017–2023	The Marvelous Mrs. Maisel	Susie Myerson	Main role; 43 episodes
2021	Awkwafina Is Nora from Queens	Wilma (voice)	Episode: "Tales from the Blackout"
2022	Resident Alien	Carlyn	Episode: "Girls' Night"
2023	Alex Borstein: Corsets & Clown Suits	Herself	Television special

=== Video games ===
Year	Title	Role	Notes
2006	Family Guy Video Game!	Lois Griffin / Various voices	
2012	Family Guy: Back to the Multiverse	Lois Griffin / Various voices	
2014	Family Guy: The Quest for Stuff	Lois Griffin / Various voices	
2022	Warped Kart Racers	Lois Griffin	Archived recordings

=== Web ===
Year	Title	Role	Notes
2008–2010	Seth MacFarlane's Cavalcade of Cartoon Comedy	Various voices	6 episodes
2011	The Jeff Lewis 5-Minute Comedy Hour	Wife	Episode: ”ATM”
2024	Hot Ones	Lois Griffin	Episode: "Peter Griffin Bares It All While Eating Spicy Wings"

=== Radio ===
Year	Title	Role	Notes
2015	Special Relativity	Nox / Lucinda	

== Awards and nominations ==
Year	Organization	Category	Work(s)	Result
2006	DVD Exclusive Awards	Best Screenplay (for a DVD Premiere Movie)	Stewie Griffin: The Untold Story	Won
2006	Spike Video Game Awards	Best Cast	Family Guy Video Game!	Won
2006	Screen Actors Guild Awards	Outstanding Performance by a Cast in a Motion Picture	Good Night, and Good Luck	Nominated
2008	Primetime Emmy Awards	Outstanding Animated Program	Family Guy; Episode: "Blue Harvest"	Nominated
2013	Primetime Emmy Awards	Outstanding Voice-Over Performance	Family Guy; Episode: "Lois Comes Out of Her Shell"	Nominated
2018	Critics' Choice Television Awards	Best Supporting Actress in a Comedy Series	The Marvelous Mrs. Maisel	Nominated
2018	Primetime Emmy Awards	Outstanding Supporting Actress in a Comedy Series	The Marvelous Mrs. Maisel	Won
2018	Primetime Emmy Awards	Outstanding Character Voice-Over Performance	Family Guy; Episode: "Nanny Goats"	Won
2019	Golden Globe Awards	Best Supporting Actress – Series, Miniseries or Television Film	The Marvelous Mrs. Maisel	Nominated
2019	Critics' Choice Television Awards	Best Supporting Actress in a Comedy Series	The Marvelous Mrs. Maisel	Won
2019	Screen Actors Guild Awards	Outstanding Performance by a Female Actor in a Comedy Series	The Marvelous Mrs. Maisel	Nominated
2019	Screen Actors Guild Awards	Outstanding Performance by an Ensemble in a Comedy Series	The Marvelous Mrs. Maisel	Won
2019	Primetime Emmy Awards	Outstanding Supporting Actress in a Comedy Series	The Marvelous Mrs. Maisel	Won
2019	Primetime Emmy Awards	Outstanding Character Voice-Over Performance	Family Guy; Episode: "Throw It Away"	Nominated
2020	Critics' Choice Television Awards	Best Supporting Actress in a Comedy Series	The Marvelous Mrs. Maisel	Won
2020	Screen Actors Guild Awards	Outstanding Performance by a Female Actor in a Comedy Series	The Marvelous Mrs. Maisel	Nominated
2020	Screen Actors Guild Awards	Outstanding Performance by an Ensemble in a Comedy Series	The Marvelous Mrs. Maisel	Won
2020	Primetime Emmy Awards	Outstanding Supporting Actress in a Comedy Series	The Marvelous Mrs. Maisel	Nominated
2022	Primetime Emmy Awards	Outstanding Supporting Actress in a Comedy Series	The Marvelous Mrs. Maisel	Nominated
2024	Critics' Choice Television Awards	Best Supporting Actress in a Comedy Series	The Marvelous Mrs. Maisel	Nominated
2024	Primetime Emmy Awards	Outstanding Supporting Actress in a Comedy Series	The Marvelous Mrs. Maisel	Nominated
2024	Primetime Emmy Awards	Outstanding Character Voice-Over Performance	Family Guy; Episode: "A Bottle Episode"	Nominated
2024	Screen Actors Guild Awards	Outstanding Performance by a Female Actor in a Comedy Series	The Marvelous Mrs. Maisel	Nominated
