= Lois Griffin =

Fictional character from the Family Guy franchise

- Family Guy character
- First appearance: "Death Has a Shadow" (1999)
- Created by: Seth MacFarlane
- Designed by: Seth MacFarlane
- Voiced by: Alex Borstein

In-universe information
- Full name: Lois Patrice Griffin (née Pewterschmidt)
- Gender: Female
- Occupation: Housewife; Piano Instructor; Flight Attendant; Model; Former Mayor; Journalist; Boxer; Retail Worker
- Family: Carter Pewterschmidt (father); Barbara Pewterschmidt (mother); Patrick Pewterschmidt (brother); Carol Pewterschmidt (sister); Tatum Pewterschmidt (adoptive sister)
- Spouse: Peter Griffin
- Children: Meg Griffin (daughter); Chris Griffin (son); Stewie Griffin (son)
- Relatives: Marguerite Pewterschmidt (great-aunt; deceased); Lillian (great-aunt); Jerry Pewderschmidt (uncle)
- Home: Quahog, Rhode Island
- Nationality: American
- Age: 43

Mayor of Quahog (Temporarily)
- In office May 13, 2007 – May 27, 2007
- Preceded by: Adam West
- Succeeded by: Adam West

Lois Patrice Griffin (née Pewterschmidt) is a fictional character from the American animated television series Family Guy. She is voiced by Alex Borstein and first appeared in the show's pilot episode, "Death Has a Shadow", on January 31, 1999. Writer Seth MacFarlane created and designed Lois after his 1995 student film, The Life of Larry, was picked up by 20th Century Fox for a series order. Lois is the matriarch of the Griffin family. She and her husband Peter have three children: Meg, Chris, and Stewie.

== Role in Family Guy ==
Lois Griffin was born to affluent WASP multibillionaire parents, Carter and Barbara Pewterschmidt. It is revealed in the episode "Family Goy" that her mother is actually a Jewish American Holocaust survivor who concealed her Judaism, and Lois was raised Protestant. Lois and the rest of the Griffins live in the fictional city of Quahog, Rhode Island, which is modeled after Cranston, Rhode Island. Lois speaks with a distinctive nasal New England accent. In the episode "A Lot Going on Upstairs", Lois’s drivers license reveals that her height is 5 feet 8 inches (1.73 m). Lois primarily works as a housewife throughout the series, though she did give piano lessons in early episodes. She has also had various jobs in single episodes such as in "FOX-y Lady", where she becomes the new reporter for Fox News Channel; in "It Takes a Village Idiot, and I Married One", Lois is elected the mayor of Quahog; and in "Call Girl" Lois gets a job doing phone sex. In the episode "Take a Letter", Lois works at the Post Office. In the episode "Dammit Janet!" Lois gets a job as a flight attendant. Lois is a championship boxer who retires with an undefeated record of 18–0 in the episode "Baby, You Knock Me Out". Lois is also a Black belt in Tae-Jitsu, which she quickly achieved in the episode "Lethal Weapons". In "The Fat Guy Strangler", Lois is revealed to have a murderous brother. Throughout the most recent season, season 25, she has served a recurring role as United States Secretary of defense.

== Character ==
=== Creation ===
While still in college, Family Guy creator Seth MacFarlane created a cartoon short called The Life of Larry. The short centered around a middle-aged man named Larry and his anthropomorphic dog Steve; other characters are his patient wife Lois and his overweight teenage son Milt. He made a sequel called Larry & Steve, which Cartoon Network broadcast in 1997. In 1999, MacFarlane was working for Hanna-Barbera Studios, writing for shows such as Johnny Bravo, Dexter's Laboratory, and Cow and Chicken. The short caught the eye of 20th Century Fox representatives, who asked him to create a TV series revolving around the characters. MacFarlane was given a US $50,000 budget to develop a pilot for the show, which was about one twentieth of what most pilots cost. MacFarlane claims to have drawn inspiration from several sitcoms, including The Simpsons and All in the Family. Several premises were also carried over from several 1980s Saturday morning cartoons he watched as a child, namely The Fonz and the Happy Days Gang, and Rubik, the Amazing Cube.

In three months, MacFarlane created the Griffin family and developed a pilot for the show he called Family Guy. Brian's character was largely based on Steve from the Larry and Steve cartoon, with Larry serving as the primary basis of the Peter character. While Larry and Peter's wives share the same name, they do not resemble one another. Peter's son Chris, by contrast, harbors a design similarity to Larry's son Milt. Stewie and Meg were new characters that were completely new at the time, and were not based on old Seth MacFarlane characters. Peter's personality was also inspired by a friend of his father who fell asleep while watching the 1993 film Philadelphia. The network executives were impressed with the pilot and ordered thirteen episodes, giving MacFarlane a $2 million per-season contract.

=== Voice ===
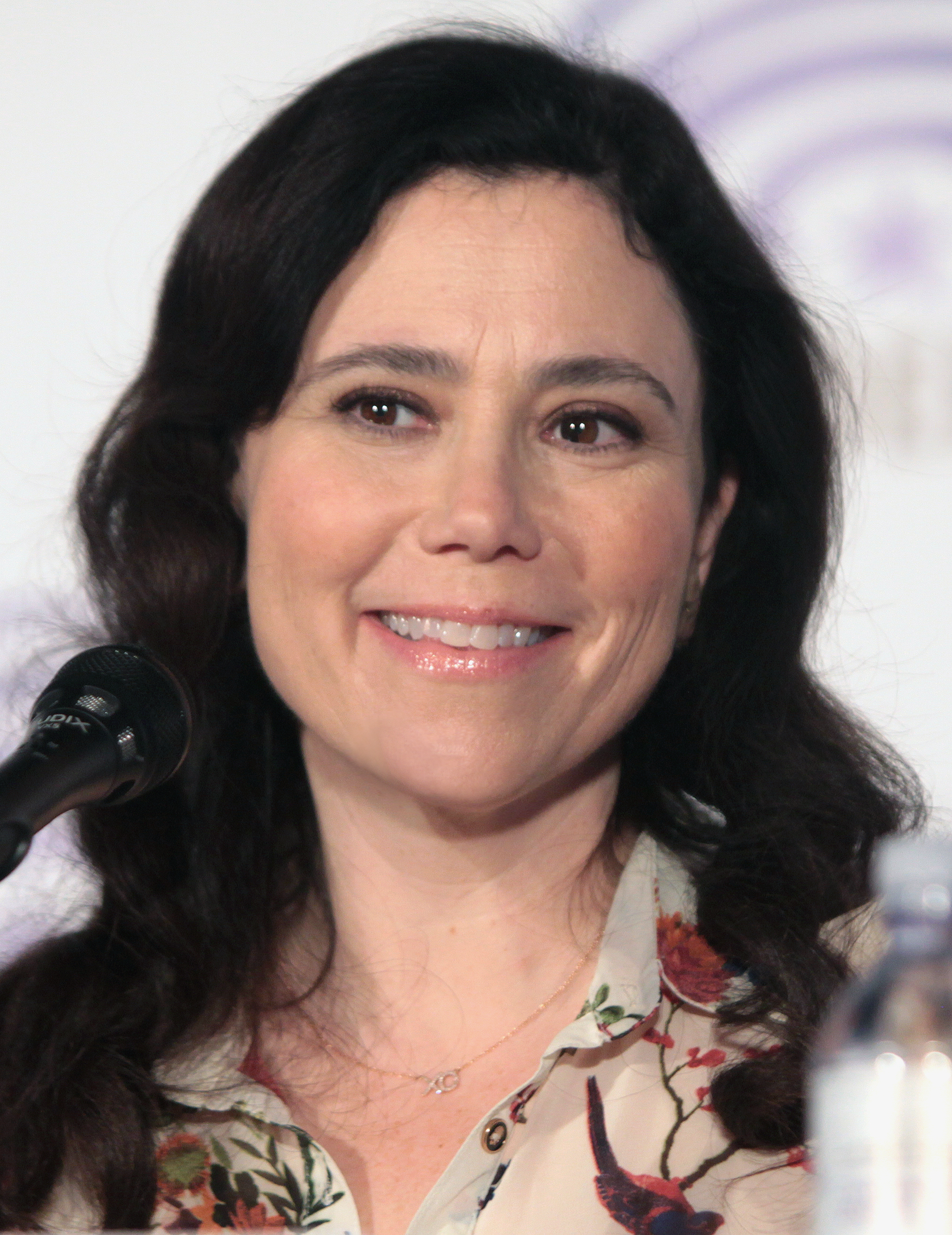
Alex Borstein is the voice of Lois Griffin.

Lois Griffin is voiced by producer and staff writer Alex Borstein who also voices recurring characters such as Asian reporter Tricia Takanawa, Loretta Brown and Lois' mother Barbara Pewterschmidt. Borstein has been part of the main voice cast from the beginning of the series including the pilot, and has voiced Lois from the start.

"I was doing this character in a stage show, so I brought that over, which was very slow... that was based on my cousin in Long Island and Seth said that 'It would be a four hour show if you talked at that pace so could you make it quicker and raise it?'.

"Over the years you can notice that it started lower and slower and it's gotten higher and higher and quicker and quicker."

— Alex Borstein, on Lois Griffin's Origins, Interview with IGN.

At the time when Family Guy was being developed, Borstein was working in the sketch comedy series, MADtv. She was asked to audition by a member of the MADtv staff who was helping MacFarlane develop the show. She had not met MacFarlane or seen any artwork and said it was "really sight unseen". At the time, she was doing a stage show in Los Angeles, in which she played a redhead mother, whose voice she had based on one of her cousins from Long Island, New York. She took the voice of the character to the set and used it for Lois. The voice was originally slower; when MacFarlane heard it, he asked her to make it faster and higher. Borstein has noted that the voice of Lois has been changing from the slower original voice to the quicker up tempo voice of the present episodes.

There have been rare occasions where Borstein does not voice Lois, such as in the episode "Road to the Multiverse", where Lois is instead voiced by Japanese actress Kei Ogawa, who was required for a scene where everything in the world was Japanese (she also did the voice of Meg for the scene).

=== Personality ===
Lois's personality has evolved throughout the episodes. She is commonly the voice of reason to Peter's tomfoolery and shenanigans, but in some episodes she can act darker than normal and sometimes shows a taste for sadomasochism. In the episode "The Son Also Draws", Lois had a gambling addiction when the family went to a Native American casino and lost the family car. In the episode "Model Misbehavior", Lois becomes a bulimic model. However, in "Sibling Rivalry", just the opposite happens where Lois gains a ton of weight after Peter has a vasectomy and loses his sex drive. After outgrowing Peter's size, she discovers she enjoys being fat, leading to a new sex life where she lets Peter force feed her junk food so she can continue to grow bigger and fatter. "Stuck Together, Torn Apart" shows Peter and Lois splitting up because of Peter's jealousy, only to discover that Lois has the same jealousy. The two then decide to live together again despite their mutually jealous nature.

=== Sexuality ===
Several episodes have suggested that Lois is bisexual or, at least, bi-curious. In an interview, Borstein stated that Lois became "a little more snarky and sassy and sexual" since the first season, to challenge "those sitcom rules that a woman is supposed to be a total wet blanket and not like sex and is no fun". In the first straight-to-DVD feature, Stewie Griffin, The Untold Story, Lois also states, "women are such teases. That's why I went back to men." She reveals in "Partial Terms of Endearment" that she had a lesbian affair with Naomi while they were students at Salve Regina University, and she passionately kisses Meg's lesbian classmate Sarah in "Brian Sings and Swings". Lois fantasizes about running away with Target cashier Esparanza in "Prescription Heroine". In the pilot episode for The Cleveland Show, she and Bonnie make out to fulfill Cleveland, Peter, Quagmire, and Brian's wishes.

== Reception ==
=== Commendations ===
Lois Griffin ranked number 12 spot on "IGN's Top 25 Family Guy Characters". In "IGN's top 10 musical moments in Family Guy" ranked number three spot with the song, "This House Is Freakin' Sweet" from the episode, "Peter, Peter, Caviar Eater", (season 2, 1999). In "IGN's Family Guy: Top 10 Fights", Lois ranked on two places, in number seven and number six for Lois's fight with Stewie in "Lois Kills Stewie" and in the Griffin Family Fight from "Lethal Weapons", respectively.

== Legacy ==
=== Appearances in other media ===
Lois has had several television appearances outside of Family Guy. She and Peter both had a cameo on Drawn Together in the episode "The Lemon-AIDS Walk" where she was voiced by Borstein. She, along with the rest of her family, appeared on South Park in the episodes "Cartoon Wars Part I" and "Part II". In the Family Guy parodies of the Star Wars original trilogy titled "Blue Harvest", "Something, Something, Something, Dark Side" and "It's A Trap" which are parodies of A New Hope, The Empire Strikes Back and Return of the Jedi respectively, Lois appears as Princess Leia. Lois, and most of the central characters on Family Guy, also appeared in the pilot episode of the show's spin-off The Cleveland Show. She came in at No. 85 out of 100 on Maxim's 2012 Hot 100. She also appears in HBO's Animals Season 2 episode, "Pigeon". She, along with the family, appeared in a The Simpsons episode, "Homerland", and the short film May the 12th Be with You, along with her daughter Meg, and sons Chris and Stewie.

=== Merchandise ===
Lois is also featured on the Family Guy: Live in Vegas CD, and plays a significant part in Family Guy Video Game!, the first Family Guy video game, which was released by 2K Games in 2006. Borstein recorded exclusive material of Lois for a 2007 pinball machine of the show by Stern Pinball. In 2004, the first series of Family Guy toy figurines was released by Mezco Toyz, each member of the Griffin family had their own, except for Stewie, of whom two different figures were made. Over the course of two years, four more series of toy figures have been released, with various forms of Peter.

As of 2009, six books have been released about the Family Guy universe, all published by HarperCollins since 2005. These include Family Guy: It Takes a Village Idiot, and I Married One (ISBN 978-0-7528-7593-4), which covers the entire events of the episode "It Takes a Village Idiot, and I Married One", and Family Guy and Philosophy: A Cure for the Petarded (ISBN 978-1-4051-6316-3), a collection of seventeen essays exploring the connections between the series and historical philosophers which include Lois as a character.
