= Project Runway: Junior season 2 =

Project Runway: Junior
- Season 2
- No. of tasks: 10
- No. of contestants: 12
- Winner: Chelsea Ma
- No. of episodes: 10

Release
- Original network: Lifetime
- Original release: December 26, 2016 – February 23, 2017

Season chronology
- ← Previous; Season 1

The second season of the American reality television series Project Runway: Junior premiered on December 22, 2016 on Lifetime. It featured twelve teen designers aged between 13 and 17. The designers were described by Tim Gunn as "kids [who] have grown up watching this show" (Project Runway).

The show was co-hosted by Tim Gunn and Hannah Jeter, with Gunn also serving as the designers' workroom mentor. In his role as mentor, Tim Gunn had a "Tim Gunn Save" with which he could bring back an eliminated designer once during the season at his discretion. The three judges were fashion designer Christian Siriano (Project Runway Season 4's winner), fashion critic and designer Kelly Osbourne and Aya Kanai, Executive Fashion Director at Cosmopolitan and Seventeen magazines. Of note, unlike other versions of Project Runway, the only episode with a guest judge was the finale.

The winner of “Project Runway Junior” received a full scholarship to the prestigious FIDM in California; a complete home sewing and crafting studio, plus, the dream machine, all courtesy of Brother; a feature in Seventeen Magazine; and a $25,000 cash prize, to help launch their line. Also, butter LONDON supplied a year’s worth of products and the opportunity to consult with butter LONDON to create a limited edition nail color collection. The styles from their finale collection will be manufactured by Los Angeles Development House, Lefty Production Company.

The winner of the competition is Chelsea Ma, while Chris Russo placed as runner-up.

== Contestants ==
Name	Age	Hometown	Placement
Ruby McAloon	14	Barrington, RI	12th
Lucas Charles	14	Windermere, FL	11th
René Gutierrez	17	Dallas, TX	10th
A'kai Littlejohn	13	Hauppauge, NY	9th
Allie Cherpeski	14	Dayton, OH	8th
Cartier Dior Eliasen	16	Pocatello, ID	7th
Molly Elizabeth	17	Fort Collins, CO	6th
Tieler James	16	Abita Springs, LA	5th
Isabella "Izzy" Li-Kostrzewa	16	Mount Pleasant, MI	4th
Hawwaa Ibrahim	17	Mankato, MN	3rd
Christopher Russo	17	Calverton, NY	Runner-Up
Chelsea Ma	15	Chatsworth, CA	Winner

== Challenges ==
Elimination Chart
Designers	1	2	3	4	5	6	7	8	9	10	Eliminated Episode
Chelsea	HIGH	IN	HIGH	WIN	IN	IN	WIN	WIN	ADV	Winner	10 - Finale, Part 2
Chris	LOW	IN	LOW	IN	WIN	LOW	HIGH	HIGH	ADV	RUNNER-UP	10 - Finale, Part 2
Hawwaa	IN	LOW	LOW	HIGH	LOW	IN	LOW	LOW	ADV	3RD PLACE	10 - Finale, Part 2
Izzy	WIN	IN	IN	LOW	LOW	LOW	HIGH	HIGH	ADV	4TH PLACE	10 - Finale, Part 2
Tieler	IN	WIN	WIN	IN	HIGH	HIGH	LOW	LOW	OUT		9 - Finale, Part 1
Molly	LOW	HIGH	HIGH	IN	HIGH	HIGH	IN	OUT			8 - Race to the Finale
Cartier	IN	HIGH	IN	LOW	IN	WIN	OUT				7 - High End Italian Fashion
Allie	IN	IN	HIGH	HIGH	IN	OUT					6 - Firefighting Clients
A'kai	IN	LOW	SAFE	IN	OUT						5 - Light Up the Runway
Rene	HIGH	IN	LOW	OUT							4 - Step it Up from Day to Night
Lucas	IN	OUT									2 - An Unconventional Pool Party!
Ruby	OUT										1 - Welcome to New York

Results
The designer won Project Runway: Junior Season 2.
The designer advanced to Fashion Week.
The designer won that challenge.
The designer had the second highest score for that challenge.
The designer had one of the highest scores for that challenge, but did not win.
The designer had one of the lowest scores for that challenge, but was not eliminated.
The designer was in the bottom two, but was not eliminated.
The designer lost and was out of the competition.
The designer lost, but was brought back to the competition by Tim Gunn.

== Episodes ==
=== Episode 1: Welcome to New York ===
Original Airdate: December 22, 2016

Twelve young designers meet in New York City to compete on Project Runway: Junior. Their first challenge starts immediately.

- Challenge: Create a first impression look inspired by New York City.
- WINNER: Izzy
- ELIMINATED: Ruby

=== Episode 2: An Unconventional Pool Party! ===
Original Airdate: December 29, 2016

When the designers meet Tim and Hannah at a rooftop pool they quickly realize that they are in for their first unconventional materials challenge! Some are excited and some are scared!

- Challenge: Create a look using pool party materials.
- WINNER: Tieler
- ELIMINATED: Lucas

=== Episode 3: En Garde Avant Garde ===
Original Airdate: January 5, 2017

In their first team challenge the designers are asked to create an avant-garde look inspired by Tim Gunn’s most recent passion, fencing. When all communication fails, Tim has to step in to help.

- Challenge: Create a fencing-inspired avant-garde look.
- WINNER: Tieler
- SAVED: A'kai

=== Episode 4: Step It Up From Day to Night ===
Original Airdate: January 12, 2017

The designers are tasked to create a transitional look that takes a woman on the go from day to night.

- Challenge: Create a girl on the go look.
- WINNER: Chelsea
- ELIMINATED: Rene

=== Episode 5: Light Up the Runway ===
Original Airdate: January 19, 2017

The judges are dazzled when the designers create high fashion looks using LED lights and turn their models into a living light show!

- Challenge: Create a look using LED lights.
- WINNER: Chris
- ELIMINATED: A'kai

=== Episode 6: Firefighting Clients ===
Original Airdate: January 26, 2017

A surprise fire drill sends the designers out of the workroom to meet their new clients. Working with clients proves to be extremely challenging for some of the designers.

- Challenge: Create a date night look for firefighters' wives or girlfriends.
- WINNER: Cartier
- ELIMINATED: Allie

=== Episode 7: High End Italian Fashion ===
Original Airdate: February 2, 2017

The designers must create a high fashion look worthy of Milan Fashion Week. Everyone is giving it their all to advance to the next round but also to win a trip to Italy.

- Challenge: Create a suitable look for Milan Fashion Week.
- WINNER: Chelsea
- ELIMINATED: Cartier

=== Episode 8: Race to the Finale ===
Original Airdate: February 9, 2017

For their final challenge, the designers are tasked to create an editorial look inspired by street art murals. The designers are giving it their all to make it to the finale and because the judges forewarned a double elimination.

- Challenge: Create a high fashion look inspired by street art.
- WINNER: Chelsea
- ELIMINATED: Molly

=== Episode 9: Finale, Part 1 ===
Original Airdate: February 16, 2017

The final designers head home to create collections for the Project Runway Junior Finale in Los Angeles. The pressure is intense, as one more elimination is looming.

- Challenge: Show two pieces from final collection.
- MOVING ON: Hawwaa
- ELIMINATED: Tieler

=== Episode 10: Finale, Part 2 ===
Original Airdate: February 23, 2017

The teen designers put the final touches on their collections before showing in front of a live audience at the finale at FIDM Los Angeles! The winner of Project Runway Junior is announced. Actress and singer Olivia Holt is the guest judge.

- Challenge: Present a six-look final collection.
- WINNER: Chelsea
- RUNNER-UP: Chris
- 3RD PLACE: Hawwaa
- 4TH PLACE: Izzy
