= Project Runway: Junior season 1 =

Project Runway: Junior
- Season 1
- No. of tasks: 10
- No. of contestants: 12
- Winner: Maya Ramirez
- No. of episodes: 10

Release
- Original network: Lifetime
- Original release: November 12, 2015 – February 4, 2016

Season chronology
- Next → Season 2

The first season of the American reality television series Project Runway: Junior premiered on November 12, 2015 on Lifetime. It featured twelve teen designers aged between 13 and 17. The designers were described by Tim Gunn as "kids [who] have grown up watching this show" (Project Runway).

The show was co-hosted by Tim Gunn and Hannah Jeter, with Gunn also serving as the designers' workroom mentor. In his role as mentor, Tim Gunn had a "Tim Gunn Save" with which he could bring back an eliminated designer once during the season at his discretion. The three judges were fashion designer Christian Siriano (Project Runway Season 4's winner), fashion critic and designer Kelly Osbourne and Aya Kanai, Executive Fashion Director at Cosmopolitan and Seventeen magazines. Of note, unlike other versions of Project Runway, the only episode with a guest judge was the finale.

According to Executive Producer Sara Rea, Project Runway: Junior is a re-creation of the original adult series with no concessions in the difficulty of challenges or critiques being made for the contestants' ages. The unconventional challenge featured items from a car wash and one challenge was introduced by First Lady Michelle Obama. The winner of Project Runway: Junior received a full scholarship to the prestigious Fashion Institute of Design & Merchandising in California, a complete home sewing and crafting studio provided by Brother, a feature in Seventeen Magazine and a $25,000 cash prize to help launch their line plus a Visionworks shopping spree.

The winner of the competition is Maya Ramirez, while Samantha Cobos placed as runner-up.

== Contestants ==
Name	Age	Hometown	Placement
Samantha Johnson	16	Westlake Village, California	12th
Ysabel Hilado	17	Cerritos, California	11th
Jesse Hansen	16	Swampscott, Massachusetts	9th/10th
Victoria Cohen	17	Westlake, Ohio	9th/10th
Matt Sarafa	17	Manhattan Beach, California	8th
Bridget Austin-Weiss	16	Brockton, Massachusetts	7th
Jaxson Metzler	15	Minneapolis, Kansas	6th/5th
Zach Lindsey	16	Louisville, Kentucky	6th/5th
Zachary Fernandez	16	Berkeley, California	4th
Peytie Slater	15	Carlsbad, California	3rd
Samantha Cobos	16	Queens, New York	Runner-up
Maya Ramirez	13	Toledo, Ohio	Winner

== Challenges ==
Elimination Chart
Designers	1	2	3^{1}	4	5	6	7	8	9	10	Eliminated Episode
Maya	HIGH	IN	LOW	HIGH	WIN	LOW	WIN	WIN	ADV	WINNER	10 - Finale, Part 2
Samantha	WIN	HIGH	LOW	IN	HIGH	HIGH	WIN	LOW	ADV	RUNNER-UP	10 - Finale, Part 2
Peytie	IN	HIGH	LOW	WIN	WIN	IN	HIGH	HIGH	ADV	3RD PLACE	10 - Finale, Part 2
Zachary	IN	WIN	HIGH	HIGH	LOW	HIGH	HIGH	SAFE	ADV	4TH PLACE	10 - Finale, Part 2
Jaxson	HIGH	IN	HIGH	LOW	HIGH	LOW	OUT				7 - #OOTD
Zach	LOW	IN	HIGH	IN	HIGH	WIN	OUT				7 - #OOTD
Bridget	IN	IN	WIN	IN	HIGH	OUT					6 - Superstar Clients
Matt	IN	LOW	LOW	IN	OUT						5 - Race to the Red Carpet
Victoria	LOW	IN	HIGH	OUT							4 - OMG! That's Michelle Obama
Jesse	IN	HIGH	LOW	OUT							4 - OMG! That's Michelle Obama
Ysabel	IN	OUT									2 - Unconventional Car Wash
Sami	OUT										1 - Welcome to New York

Results
The designer won Project Runway: Junior Season 1.
The designer advanced to Fashion Week.
The designer won that challenge.
The designer had the second highest score for that challenge.
The designer had one of the highest scores for that challenge, but did not win.
The designer had one of the lowest scores for that challenge, but was not eliminated.
The designer was in the bottom two, but was not eliminated.
The designer lost and was eliminated.
The designer lost, but was brought back to the competition by Tim Gunn.

^Note 1: Although on the losing team, Maya and Jesse received positive feedback about their designs.

== Episodes ==
=== Episode 1: Welcome to New York ===
Original airdate: November 12, 2015

The next generation of up-and-coming fashionistas, ages 13 to 17, will be mentored by Emmy® Award winner Tim Gunn, who cohosts alongside supermodel Hannah Davis.

- WINNER: Samantha
- ELIMINATED: Sami

=== Episode 2: An Unconventional Carwash! ===
Original airdate: November 19, 2015

In Project Runway: Junior's first ever unconventional challenge, the young designers must create garments out of materials found at a carwash. Who will be inspired by the microfiber, tubing and sponges and who will be washed out of the competition?

- WINNER: Zachary
- ELIMINATED: Ysabel

=== Episode 3: Teamwork is Hard ===
Original airdate: December 3, 2015

The designers are divided into two teams of five and must create cohesive mini collections inspired by the decades. When one team gets off to a bad start, they find themselves going back to the drawing board...more than once!!!

- WINNER: Bridget
- ELIMINATED: None

=== Episode 4: OMG! That's Michelle Obama ===
Original airdate: December 10, 2015

First Lady Michelle Obama surprises the designers with one of the most exciting challenges of the season when one winning design will be manufactured and sold on Land's End to benefit the Peace Corps' initiative, Let Girls Learn.

- WINNER: Peytie
- ELIMINATED: Jesse & Victoria

=== Episode 5: Race to the Red Carpet ===
Original airdate: December 17, 2015

The designers are tasked with creating a red carpet look in only five short hours. Tim brings in some talented surprise guests to help them get the job done!

- WINNERS: Maya & Peytie
- ELIMINATED: Matt

=== Episode 6: Superstar Clients ===
Original airdate: January 7, 2016

The designers get up close and personal with the Knicks City Dancers, who are their clients for this challenge. For some of the designers, working with clients for the first time proves to be harder than they thought.

- WINNER: Zach
- ELIMINATED: Bridget

=== Episode 7: #OOTD ===
Original airdate: January 14, 2016

The designers hit the streets of New York to find their muses. They must use their muses "Outfits of the Day" as their inspiration. All of the judges struggle with one of the most emotional eliminations of the season.

- WINNER: Maya & Samantha
- ELIMINATED: Jaxson & Zach

=== Episode 8: Make A Statement ===
Original airdate: January 21, 2016

In the final challenge, which determines who moves forward to compete during New York Fashion Week, the designers must create a look that makes a personal statement. The pressure gets to some of them as they realize how close they are to the finale.

- ADVANCE: Maya, Samantha and Peytie
- SAVE: Zachary

=== Episode 9: Finale, Part 1 ===
Original airdate: January 28, 2016

The final designers head home to create collections for New York fashion week. Tim brings them back to New York for a check in halfway through, and the judges give them last minute advice before the big show.

- ADVANCE: Maya, Samantha, Peytie, and Zachary
- ELIMINATED: None

=== Episode 10: Finale Part 2 ===
Original airdate: February 4, 2016

The teen designers put the final touches on their collections and then show at New York Fashion week. The winner of the very first Project Runway: Junior is announced!

Guest judge: Bella Thorne

- WINNER OF PROJECT RUNWAY JUNIOR: Maya
- RUNNER-UP: Samantha
- 3RD PLACE: Peytie
- 4TH PLACE: Zachary
