= Oprah Winfrey (painting) =

2023 artwork by Shawn Michael Warren

- Oprah Winfrey
- Artist: Shawn Michael Warren
- Year: 2023
- Medium: oil on linen
- Subject: Oprah Winfrey
- Dimensions: 180 cm × 140 cm (70 in × 56 in)
- Location: National Portrait Gallery, Washington, D.C.

An oil painting portrait of Oprah Winfrey by Shawn Michael Warren was commissioned by the National Portrait Gallery in Washington, D.C. and unveiled in 2023.

The painting portrays Winfrey walking through her garden in Montecito, California, smiling and wearing a purple taffeta dress by Christian Siriano, holding an olive branch in her left hand. The color references her first film role in Steven Spielberg's 1985 version of The Color Purple. The full-length portrait measures approximately 70 in × 56 in (180 cm × 140 cm) and has been added to the permanent collection of the Smithsonian's National Portrait Gallery. The pose was chosen by the subject herself. It was completed over a span of 10 months amidst other commitments and was intended to reflect a sense of quiet strength and authenticity in Oprah.

Since 1994, the National Portrait Gallery has only commissioned about 35 portraits of living figures. Her portrait remained on view until October 2024. Rhea L. Combs, director of curatorial affairs, hoped that visitors would walk away with a feeling of joy, promise, grace and connection.

== Commission ==
The artist received the commission after painting a mural of Winfrey in the West Loop neighborhood of Chicago in 2020, near where Winfrey's Harpo Studios had been located until 2015. The full-length portrait measures approximately 70 in × 56 in (180 cm × 140 cm) and has been added to the permanent collection of the Smithsonian's National Portrait Gallery.

The purple colour of her dress is deeply personal for Oprah, who has said "That color has been seminal in my life", and is a nod to The Color Purple, the film, that changed the trajectory of her life. It is a color she has carried with her ever since, and included in her 2023 "Favourite Things" list. Her role as Sofia in the 1985 film was shot in just two weeks, but it opened doors for her.
