= LG Lotus (LX600) =

Mobile phone model

- Manufacturer: LG Electronics
- First released: September 10, 2008
- Availability by region: North America
- Form factor: Clamshell
- Dimensions: 3.30” (H) x 2.40” (W) x 0.70” (D)
- Weight: 3.7 oz (100 g)
- Memory: 80 mb
- Storage: 12 GB
- Battery: 900 mAh Li-Ion
- Rear camera: 2.0 MP
- Display: 2.4 in (61 mm)
- External display: 1.3 in (33 mm)
- Connectivity: USB & Bluetooth

LG Lotus (LX600) is a mobile phone by LG Electronics, introduced on September 10, 2008. The device was marketed as a fashion-forward device by Sprint Nextel, and was designed by fashion designer Christian V. Siriano.

Compared to its predecessors, the LG Lotus has enhanced messaging features, including a wide display screen and a full QWERTY keyboard. It was made available exclusively through Sprint.

The Lotus—which had been offered in black, purple, and red—was on Sprint's 3G CDMA EvDO network. The LG Lotus was also sold on MVNOs such as Q Link Wireless.

== Features ==
- Physical QWERTY Keyboard
- External music controls
- 2.0-megapixel camera/camcorder
- Bluetooth capability
- microSDTM Memory Port

A (quite stylish) scarf was also designed by Siriano to complement the phone. The scarf conveniently had a pocket specifically tailored to fit the LG Lotus.
