= Vlas Kobara =

Russian TV personality (born 1992)

- Влас Кобара
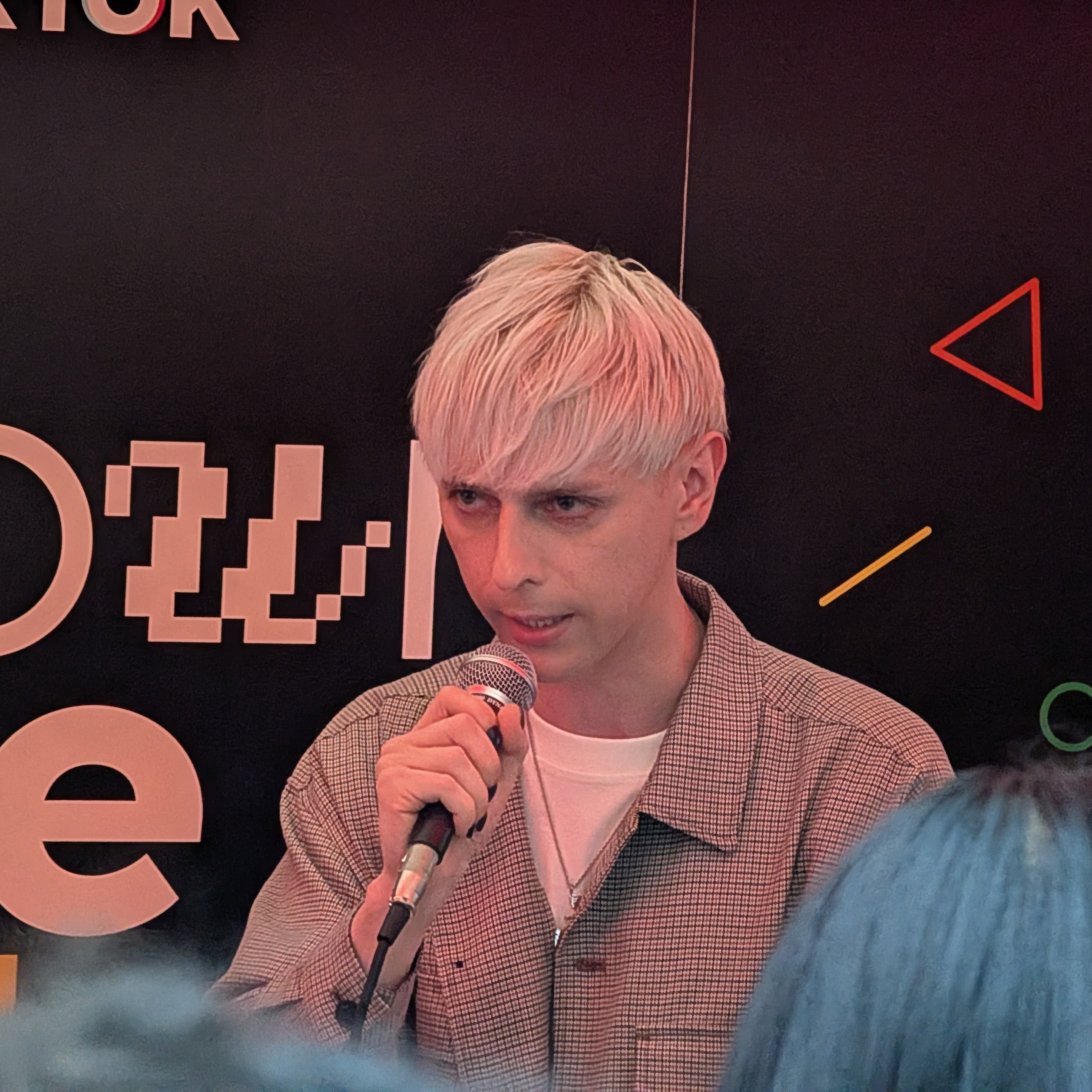
- Born: April 20, 1992 (age 34); Khabarovsk, Russia
- Other name: 小原ブラス
- Citizenship: Japan
- Occupations: TV Personality, columnist, pundit, YouTuber
- Years active: 2010
- Height: 175 cm (5 ft 9 in)

YouTube information
- Channel: ピロシキーズ
- Years active: 2018
- Genres: Political movement, interview, comedy and so on
- Subscribers: 203 thousand
- Views: 48.6 million
- Last updated: August 3rd, 2026
- Website: almostjp.com

Vlas Kobara (born April 20, 1992) is a male TV personality, columnist, and pundit from Russia who works in Japan.

He founded and represents the talent agent "Almost Japanese." In January 2022, he became a director of "Supporting Foreign Children to Attend School." He is also active as a YouTuber called "Pirozhkis," a group of two Kansai people of Russian descent. In the past, he was also active as a Niconico Live broadcaster "Buira."

He was born in Khabarovsk, Russia and grew up in Himeji, Hyogo, Japan from the age of five. He calls himself "a gay Russian with a troublesome personality who speaks Kansai dialect.

== History ==
=== Upbringing ===
He was born at Khabarovsk in the Far Eastern Federal District of Russia. While he was still an unborn child, the Soviet Union dissolved and the political system changed to Russia.

He was born to Russian parents, and his nationality is still Russian, and he is one of the Russians in Japan.

His first name, Vlas, is written in Cyrillic as Влас.

During his childhood, Russian society was extremely poor, having just transitioned from socialism to capitalism. People were struggling to grow crops in the fields (dacha) and bartering, and the elderly were babysitting the workers, helping each other to overcome the economic crisis.

His family background was in politics, but his mother was a singer and he wanted to be a singer when he was a child.

His mother had visited Japan on business and bought some Japanese sweets for him as a souvenir and went back to Russia. He became obsessed with Japanese sweets, especially the microphone-shaped sweets filled with ramune. Holding that microphone and lip-synching to Russian music programs was one of the happiest memories of his boyhood.

=== Moved to Japan ===
When he was five years old, he moved to Himeji, Hyogo, Japan, when his mother remarried a Japanese man.

He later went back to Russia periodically, although he lived and was educated in Japan. He says, "I grew up witnessing the gap between Japan, which had grown to its fullest economic potential, and Russia, which was trying to rebuild its dissolved economy."

=== Popularity on Niconico Live ===
In July 2010, at the age of 18, he started Niconico Live

The video "a Russian use a pressure cooker for the first time on air and make a big fuss" that viewers reprinted from his broadcast became a big hit, and he became a very popular. Since then, he has been in demand at various events, including Niconico Live's official broadcasts and the Niconico Super Conference.

=== Experience in Shinjuku Ni-Chome ===
In 2012, he moved to Tokyo The first place he was taken to by his first friend in Tokyo was Shinjuku Ni-chōme, the most biggest gay village in Japan.

Foreigners fluent in Japanese and gay men were not uncommon in Shinjuku Ni-chōme, and there were many people just like him. No one was surprised if someone was cross-dressing, dressed flamboyantly, or spoke in gay male speech. Furthermore, he saw many people of a gender he had never heard of.

He felt comfortable talking to the people of Shinjuku Ni-chōme. This was not because he was inconspicuous, but because no one asked him questions such as "what kind of girls do you like?" as if they assumed his sexual orientation was heterosexual.

Earlier, when he revealed to someone he met for the first time that "I am gay," the conversation went on as if "everything about me consists of 'gay'." In reality, being gay is only one part of what makes up who he is. He had a hard time coming out and often lied about it in everyday conversation. But in Shinjuku Ni-chōme, he did not have to lie. He said he learned that "lies unconsciously become a burden on the mind".

=== Back to activities ===
In December 2018, he and Alexandra Nakaniwa, a Russian woman living in Japan and raised in the Kansai region, opened a YouTube channel called "Pirozhkis" and started posting videos.

On September 19, 2018, broadcast of a Japanese TV program "Preoccupied at Five O'Clock!" (Tokyo MX), where he appeared as a substitute black ship correspondent and was well received by viewers for his logical remarks; from April 2019, he became a regular black ship correspondent on Wednesdays.

On December 22, 2020, he launched Almost Japanese, a talent agent that manages and casts foreign personalities in and around Japan. He was concerned about the tendency to exclude foreigners (nativism) in Japan and wanted to "act as a buffer between the Japanese and foreigners as a 'foreigner who understands Japan'."
