= Project Runway: Junior =

2015 American TV series

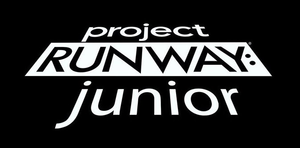
- Genre: Reality television
- Presented by: Tim Gunn; Hannah Jeter (née Davis)
- Judges: Christian Siriano; Kelly Osbourne; Aya Kanai
- Country of origin: United States
- Original language: English
- No. of seasons: 2
- No. of episodes: 20

Production
- Executive producers: Bob Weinstein; Harvey Weinstein; Patrick Reardon; Barbara Schneeweiss; Sara Rea; Tim Gunn; Jane Cha; Desiree Gruber; Eli Lehrer; Mary Donahue; David Hillman
- Production location: Los Angeles Fashion Institute of Design & Merchandising
- Production companies: Full Picture; Sara Rea Productions; The Weinstein Company Television

Original release
- Network: Lifetime
- Release: November 12, 2015 – February 23, 2017

Project Runway: Junior is an American reality television series that premiered on November 12, 2015 on Lifetime. It is the eighth direct spin-off series of another series, Project Runway, which airs on the same network. It featured twelve teen designers aged between 13 and 17. The designers were described by Tim Gunn as "kids [who] have grown up watching this show" (Project Runway).

The show was cohosted by Tim Gunn and Hannah Jeter, with Gunn also serving as the designers' workroom mentor. In his role as mentor, Tim Gunn had a "Tim Gunn Save" with which he could bring back an eliminated designer once during the season at his discretion. The three judges were fashion designer Christian Siriano (Project Runway Season 4's winner), fashion critic and designer Kelly Osbourne and Aya Kanai, Executive Fashion Director at Cosmopolitan and Seventeen magazines. Of note, unlike other versions of Project Runway, the only episode with a guest judge was the finale.

According to Executive Producer Sara Rea, Project Runway: Junior is a re-creation of the original adult series with no concessions in the difficulty of challenges or critiques being made for the contestants' ages.

In May 2016, Lifetime renewed Project Runway: Junior for a second and third season in a deal with The Weinstein Company. However, the show was cancelled after two seasons.

== Format ==
Same as Project Runway, All Stars follows the same format with challenges, judgings, and eliminations.

=== Judging ===
Judges on Project Runway Junior
Judge	Season	
Judge	1	2
Hannah Jeter	Main	Main
Christian Siriano	Main	Main
Kelly Osbourne	Main	Main
Aya Kanai	Main	Main

== Series overview ==
Season	Premiere date	Finale date	Winner	Runner-up	No. of contestants	Designer prizes
1	November 12, 2015	February 4, 2016	Maya Ramirez	Samantha Cobos	12	A $25,000 cash prize to help launch their line; A full scholarship to the prestigious Fashion Institute of Design & Merchandising in California; A complete home sewing and crafting studio provided by Brother; A feature in Seventeen Magazine; A Visionworks shopping spree
2	December 26, 2016	February 23, 2017	Chelsea Ma	Chris Russo	12	A $25,000 cash prize to help launch their line; A full scholarship to the prestigious Fashion Institute of Design & Merchandising in California; A complete home sewing and crafting studio provided by Brother; A feature in Seventeen Magazine; A year’s worth of products and the opportunity to consult with butter LONDON to create a limited edition nail color collection
