= Farmer Guy =

- Family Guy episode
- Episode no.: Season 11; Episode 20
- Directed by: Mike Kim
- Written by: Patrick Meighan
- Production code: AACX19
- Original air date: May 12, 2013

Episode chronology
← Previous "Save the Clam"	Next → "Roads to Vegas"
- Family Guy season 11

"Farmer Guy" is the twentieth episode of the eleventh season and the 209th overall episode of the animated comedy series Family Guy. It aired on Fox in the United States on May 12, 2013, and is written by Patrick Meighan and directed by Mike Kim. In the episode, after Peter buys a farm to get away from Quahog's rising crime problem, he becomes a meth dealer.

== Plot ==
Tom Tucker and Joyce Kinney do a news report on rising crime in Quahog. Glenn Quagmire is mugged by a criminal who doesn't know who Truman Capote was. At Quahog's Ocean World, a seal named Bojangles threatens his trainer for her bucket of fish and forces her to rub his belly. At the hospital, a baby is born with a gun and runs about the hospital shooting wildly. Some days later, the Griffins return home to find they have been robbed. After losing their peace of mind, Peter buys a farm and tells the family they are moving, selling their house on Craigslist. Despite some initial reservations, the family decides to go along although Brian is suspicious of their motives for taking him to a “farm” (thinking they will euthanize him) and briefly takes Stewie hostage. Arriving, they adjust to farm life. But Lois delivers news that they are hemorrhaging money and are in danger of losing the farm.

Brian offers to go to college to learn something of value in farming to help out and heads out. During a tornado, the Griffins take shelter in a storm cellar and discover a methamphetamine lab. Lois wants to call the police, but Peter decides to use it to get back on their feet. Despite her reservations, she agrees to make meth just long enough to get profitable. Peter becomes paranoid as he develops a carrier pigeon delivery system as Stewie buys decongestants. Brian returns to find that the farm and the family have gone to hell and are only wearing their underclothes (except for Meg who is unconscious for some reason). A news report reveals that the family is responsible for a flood of drugs into Quahog, Tricia Takanawa and almost everyone else hooked on meth, worsening the crime problem. Lois, distraught by how their business is destroying Quahog and changing the Griffins for the worst, packs up and convinces everyone to go back home. Peter at first is reluctant to leave, but changes his mind when he suddenly remembers the lab going haywire at the moment, thus blowing up the farm immediately. Eventually, they're back at their original house, having managed to buy it back after property values plummeted during the crime wave. When Jodie Sweetin comes looking for a taste of their drugs, Peter has the family hide out while he takes care of the situation.

== Reception ==
The episode received a 2.4 rating in the 18-49 demographic and was watched by a total of 4.82 million viewers. This made it the most watched show on Fox's Animation Domination line-up that night, beating The Cleveland Show, The Simpsons, Bob's Burgers and American Dad!. Kevin McFarland of The A.V. Club gave the episode a B, describing the plot as "thin".
