= Tim Gunn's Guide to Style =

- Genre: Documentary
- Based on: A Guide to Quality, Taste and Style
- Developed by: Tim Gunn
- Starring: Tim Gunn; Gretta Monahan
- Country of origin: United States
- Original language: English
- No. of seasons: 2
- No. of episodes: 16

Production
- Executive producers: Karen Kunkel Young; Sarah-Jane Cohen; Scott Stone
- Running time: 42 minutes (excluding commercials)
- Production companies: Stone & Company Entertainment

Original release
- Network: Bravo
- Release: September 6, 2007 – November 20, 2008

Related
- Project Runway

Tim Gunn's Guide to Style is an American reality television series on Bravo. The series debuted on September 6, 2007 based on the self-help book A Guide to Quality, Taste and Style and is hosted by Project Runway's Tim Gunn, and co-hosted by model Veronica Webb in the first season and Gretta Monahan in the second season. Gunn and his cohost offer to make over guests following their style as long as they adhere to a set of style rules.

== Format ==
The show's format consists of several segments. After meeting the guest and reviewing an interview tape, the show starts with the hosts reviewing and then discarding most of the guest's existing wardrobe. Another segment involves the use of OptiTex fashion design software to illustrate the appearance of different fashions on a computer simulation of the guest, followed by a solo shopping spree for "ten essential items", which the hosts then critique. The guest will also meet with specialty consultants, such as designers, hairdressers or runway coaches, for one-on-one coaching. The show ends with a revealing to the guest's friends and family to show off the changes in their style.

== Episodes ==
=== Series overview ===
Season	Episodes	Originally released	
Season	Episodes	First released	Last released
1	8	September 6, 2007	November 22, 2007
2	8	October 2, 2008	November 20, 2008

=== Season 1 (2007) ===
No. overall	No. in season	Title	Original release date
1	1	"Rebecca Pennino"	September 6, 2007
Note: Catherine Malandrino makes a guest appearance in this episode.
2	2	"JeAnne Swinley"	September 13, 2007
3	3	"Nicole Appelman"	September 20, 2007
4	4	"Stephanie Lichten"	September 27, 2007
5	5	"Lori Jones"	November 15, 2007
6	6	"Elena"	November 22, 2007
7	7	"Gina Scarda"	November 29, 2007
8	8	"Karen Vito"	December 22, 2007

=== Season 2 (2008) ===
No. overall	No. in season	Title	Original release date
9	1	"Meredith"	October 2, 2008
10	2	"Angela"	October 9, 2008
11	3	"Ali"	October 16, 2008
Note: Oscar Blandi and Carmen Marc Valvo make guest appearances in this episode.
12	4	"Caroline"	October 23, 2008
Note: Bobbi Brown makes a guest appearance in this episode.
13	5	"Diana"	October 30, 2008
Note: Tabatha Coffey makes a guest appearance in this episode.
14	6	"Eliza"	November 6, 2008
15	7	"Ariana"	November 13, 2008
16	8	"Erica"	November 20, 2008
Note: Tyson Beckford makes a guest appearance in this episode.
