= Brad Walsh =

American singer-songwriter

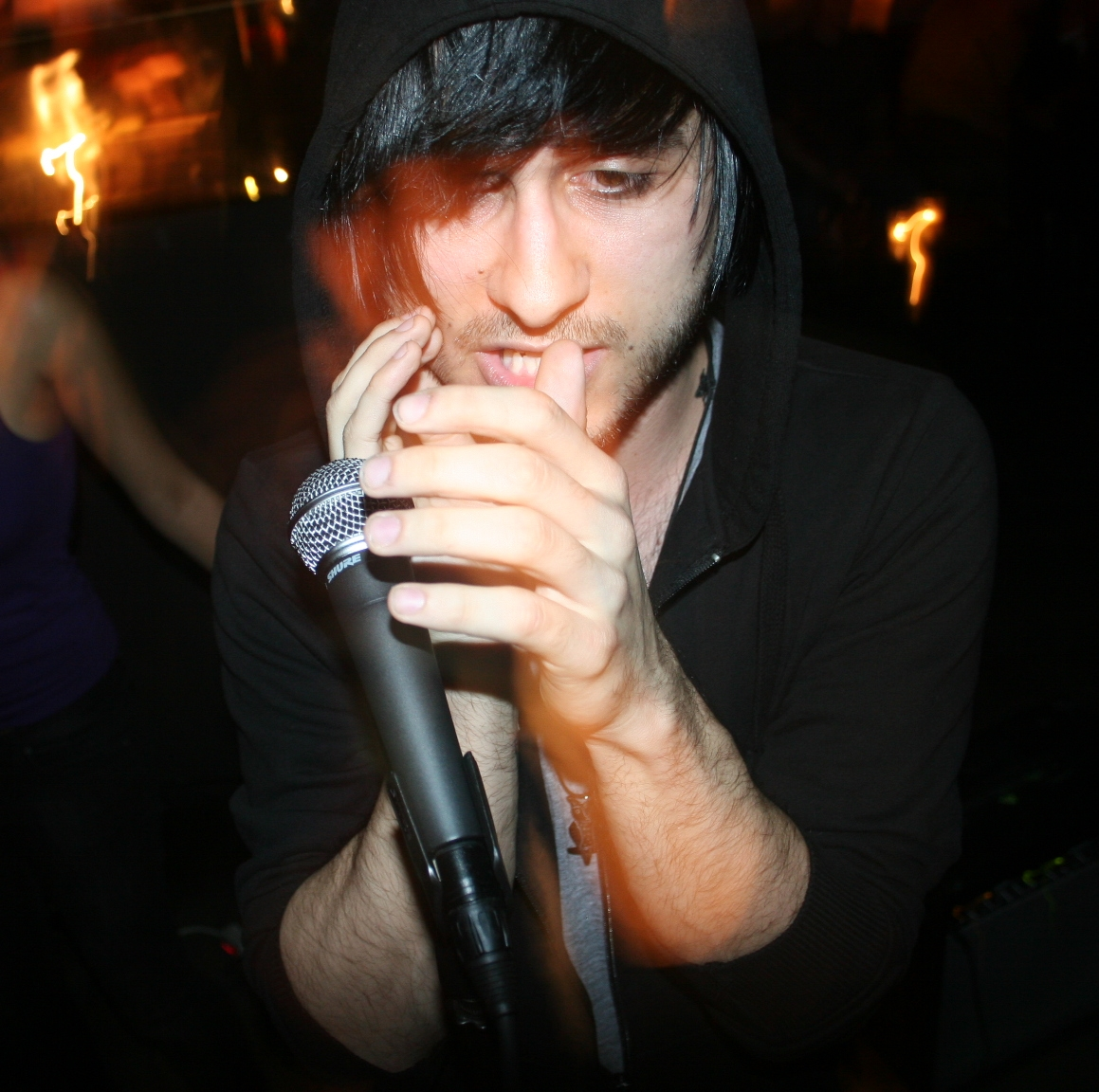
- Walsh performing

Background information
- Born: 1982 (age 43–44); Cleveland, Ohio, U.S.
- Origin: New York City
- Genres: Pop; dance; experimental
- Occupations: Singer; songwriter; record producer
- Years active: 2009–present
- Label: OMGBTW
- Website: bradwalsh.com

Brad Walsh (born 1982) is an American singer and record producer known for his pop and experimental music, as well as his dance remixes of pop artists including Britney Spears, Adam Lambert, and Lady Gaga.

== Career ==
Walsh has released several albums and singles since 2009. His songs and remixes have sold millions of copies. His 2011 album Right Now received positive reviews from Vogue Italia, The Advocate, and Out. and his 2016 album Six Infinite was praised by Time and Paper magazines. In 2009 and 2010 he remixed songs by Adam Lambert and Britney Spears among other artists and reached the top of a Billboard dance chart. His music has been used on commercials and television shows including shows on Bravo, E!, Showtime and The Oprah Winfrey Show, and he composes runway music for shows at New York Fashion Week. He reportedly has stage fright and does not often perform live because of it.

According to Time magazine, "for singer/songwriter and producer Brad Walsh, every song is a chance to tell a story." In that same article Walsh describes his musical style as "guerrilla pop ... it's chaotic, untrained, uninformed—born completely out of passion for what I'm doing." Walsh's 2017 album Antiglot was an experimental collection of songs created "only with vocal layering and manipulation of sounds produced from his body", and the title of the album is a Latin reference to the lack of language in the music. There were no instruments, and no lyrics on the Antiglot album, just vocals. His 2019 album Artbreak was a "pop opera" about his divorce from fashion designer Christian Siriano and included many spoken guest vocal spots from famous actors and actresses, including Danielle Brooks, Cheyenne Jackson, Lena Dunham, Janet Mock, Gabourey Sidibe, Debra Messing, Sarah Rafferty, Carrie Fisher, Nico Tortorella, and Heather Matarazzo.

Walsh also has had success as a fashion and celebrity photographer, as well as a painter with his work shown at department store Bergdorf Goodman in New York, and he is recognized for his interior design work. He started his own record label, OMGBTW Records. In 2023 he released a book of poetry and illustrations called The Overwhelming Expectation of Pleasantness, with actress Sarah Paulson calling it "a work of extraordinary depth."

== Personal life ==
Brad Walsh is reportedly worth $8.5 million as of 2021. He was married to fashion designer Christian Siriano. They lived together in Chelsea, Manhattan with their two dogs named Topper and Bear. They had been together since November 2007, and became engaged in July 2013. They were married on July 9, 2016, at their vacation home in Danbury, Connecticut. On June 25, 2018, Walsh confirmed that he and Siriano had separated the previous month. The pair did not make the divorce official until 2021.

== Discography ==
=== Albums and EPs ===
- Antiglot II (2022)
- House Party EP (2021)
- Artbreak (2019)
- Remixography (2019)
- Antiglot (2017)
- Six Infinite (2016)
- Secondary EP (2016)
- Primary EP (2015)
- Demos & Unreleased (2013)
- Right Now (2011)
- Runway Vol. 1 (2010)
- Unhitched Restitched (2010)
- Human Nature (2009)

=== Remixes ===
- Selena Gomez – "Good For You" (Brad Walsh Remix) (2015)
- Taylor Swift – "Bad Blood" (Brad Walsh Remix) (2015)
- Tove Lo – "Talking Body" (Brad Walsh Remix) (2015)
- Alicia Witt – "Do It" (Brad Walsh Remix) (Symphonic Dist 2013)
- Gotye – "Somebody That I Used To Know" (Brad Walsh Remix) (2012)
- Britney Spears – "Hold It Against Me" (Brad Walsh Remix) (2011)
- The B-52's – "Juliet of the Spirits" (Brad Walsh Remix) (2011)
- Juliana Hatfield – "Don't Wanna Dance" (Brad Walsh Remix) (2011)
- Junior Sanchez feat. Brad Walsh – "We Luv the Nite" (Nervous Records 2011)
- Lady Gaga – "Monster" (Brad Walsh Remixes) (2010)
- Operator Please – "Volcanic" (Brad Walsh Remixes) (EMI Australia 2010)
- Sarah McLachlan – "Loving You Is Easy" (Brad Walsh Remix) (Sony/Arista 2010)
- Kat DeLuna feat. Akon – "Push Push" (Brad Walsh Remix) (2010)
- Rihanna – "Rude Boy" (Brad Walsh Remix) (2010)
- Adam Lambert – "Whataya Want From Me" (Brad Walsh Remixes) (RCA/Jive 2010)
- Adam Lambert – "For Your Entertainment" (Brad Walsh Remix) (RCA/Jive 2009)
- Junior Sanchez feat. Good Charlotte – "Elevator" (Brad Walsh Remix) (2009)
- Britney Spears – "3" (Brad Walsh Remix) (2009)
- Kat DeLuna – "Unstoppable" (Brad Walsh Remix) (2009)
- Beyoncé – "Single Ladies" (Brad Walsh Remix) (2008)
- Kanye West – "Love Lockdown" (Brad Walsh Remix) (2008)
- Britney Spears – "Womanizer" (Brad Walsh Remix) (2008)
- Ashlee Simpson – "Outta My Head" (Brad Walsh Remix) (2007)
- MIA – "Pull Up the People" (Brad Walsh Remix) (2006)

== See also ==
- LGBT culture in New York City
- List of LGBT people from New York City
- NYC Pride March
