= Aya Kanai =

American fashion editor (born 1978)

- Born: 1978 (age 47–48); New York City
- Education: Oberlin College
- Occupation: Fashion editor
- Known for: Chief Fashion Director for Hearst Publications

Aya Kanai (born 1978) is the current Head of Editorial and Creative at Google Shopping. She is also an American fashion editor who formerly served as the Editor in Chief of Marie Claire and the Chief Fashion Director for Hearst Publications, and supervised the magazines Cosmopolitan, Seventeen, Redbook, Good Housekeeping, and Woman's Day. She also serves as one of the judges on the Lifetime reality TV series Project Runway: Junior. Kanai is a former Head of Content and Creator Partnerships at Pinterest.

== Biography ==
=== Early life and work ===
Kanai was born in 1978 to parents with artistic backgrounds, her father being a graphic designer and her mother working for the Japanese fashion designer Issey Miyake. She was born and raised in New York City. She has stated that "Art was always a very normal part of my upbringing." As she grew up, Kanai considered careers in fine art and puppetry, and enjoyed fashion and performance art. As a high-school student, she considered becoming an actress. She attended Oberlin College in Ohio, focusing in art and East Asian studies, and also studying religion. During her junior year, she interned for the fashion department at New York magazine.

Graduating from Oberlin with a degree in visual art, she won a Thomas J. Watson Fellowship to study puppet theater, conducting research in countries including Poland, the Czech Republic, France, and Japan. Upon returning to the United States, Kanai worked at a vegan restaurant in the East Village, Manhattan neighborhood of New York City, also performing at puppet theater venues such as La MaMa Experimental Theatre Club and St. Ann's Warehouse.

After being cast in Ping Chong's Obon, a puppet performance piece, Kanai traveled internationally for a year and a half before deciding on a career change, remarking retrospectively in an interview that she realized: "Wait a minute: This is not my path. I was at the top of my game, performing in the show everyone wants to be in, but I couldn't imagine doing it forever. And if you're 23 and you've hit the wall, you've got to figure out something else to do."

=== Career in fashion ===
At 23, Kanai applied to work for the new magazine Teen Vogue, where she was hired as a fashion assistant. Because of the magazine's small staff size, she worked closely with the editor-in-chief and oversaw her own photo shoots and features. Kanai eventually became an accessories editor before she left Teen Vogue after three years to work for the magazine Nylon, where she became the fashion director. Working there for three years, she then returned to Teen Vogue as their West Coast editor, leaving after a year to do freelance work; she served as a stylist for ad campaigns and editorials in New York. She became the head stylist for the Amazon subsidiary Shopbop. At a friend's baby shower, Kanai reconnected with the executive director of Cosmopolitan magazine, whom she had known during her previous work in New York. She was introduced to Joanna Coles, editor-in-chief of Cosmopolitan, and shortly afterwards Kanai was hired as Cosmopolitan's fashion director, also becoming the fashion editor for Seventeen magazine a year later.

Throughout her career, Kanai has styled celebrities including Katy Perry, Cameron Diaz, Gwen Stefani, Jennifer Lawrence, Rita Ora, Bella Thorne, Jennifer Lopez, Miranda Kerr, Michelle Williams, Ashley Olsen, and Sienna Miller. Kanai has also served as a stylist for Cole Haan, Victoria's Secret, and Virgin Mobile magazine advertisements.

She is currently the Executive Fashion Director for both Cosmopolitan and Seventeen, and the Chief Fashion Director at Hearst Publications, overseeing the magazines Good Housekeeping, Redbook, and Woman's Day. She left Marie Claire and joined Pinterest as the head of content and editorial partnerships in September 2020. She also serves as one of the three judges for Lifetime reality TV series Project Runway: Junior.

Kanai lives in Brooklyn, in New York City. She gave birth to her first child via in vitro fertilisation in 2018.

== Sources ==
- Spivack, E. (2017). Worn in New York: 68 Sartorial Memoirs of the City. Abrams. ISBN 978-1419727078.
