= Do I Sound Gay? =

2014 film

- Theatrical release poster
- Directed by: David Thorpe
- Produced by: Howard Gertler; David Thorpe
- Starring: Margaret Cho; Tim Gunn; Don Lemon; Dan Savage; David Sedaris; George Takei
- Cinematography: Matt Bockelman
- Edited by: Nicholas Bussey; Maeve O'Boyle
- Music by: John Turner
- Production companies: Impact Partners; Little Punk; ThinkThorpe
- Distributed by: Sundance Selects
- Release dates: September 7, 2014 (TIFF); July 10, 2015
- Running time: 77 minutes
- Country: United States
- Language: English
- Box office: $122,595

Do I Sound Gay? is a 2014 American documentary film by David Thorpe that explores the existence and accuracy of stereotypes about the speech patterns of gay men, and the ways in which one's degree of conformity to the stereotype can contribute to internalized homophobia. Other figures participating in the film include Dan Savage, George Takei, David Sedaris, Tim Gunn, and Margaret Cho, as well as University of Toronto linguist Ron Smyth.

The film was funded in part by a Kickstarter campaign in the spring of 2014.

== Synopsis ==
David Thorpe becomes concerned that his gay-sounding voice is limiting his opportunities in life. He visits two speech therapists to evaluate his condition and help him gain control of his speaking voice. Eventually he realizes that he intentionally changed his voice at about age 17 when he came out and wanted others to know he was gay.

== Participants ==
- David Thorpe
- Dan Savage
- George Takei
- David Sedaris
- Margaret Cho
- Tim Gunn
- Don Lemon
- Jeff Hiller
- Michael Airington
- Ron Smyth
- Robert Corff
- Miguel Gutierrez
- Richard Barrios

== Production ==
Director David Thorpe had always been self-conscious about his voice. When Thorpe did not have a lot of confidence, he described his voice as "I felt bad about being effeminate and how my voice was the leading edge of my effeminacy". Production of Do I Sound Gay? was crowdfunded through a Kickstarter campaign launched by Thorpe on April 30, 2014. The campaign would go on to raise $120,573 out of $115,000 goal with 1,968 backers.

== Release ==
=== Box office ===
Do I Sound Gay? opened theatrically in one venue on July 10, 2015, and earned $10,461 in its first weekend. At the end of its run, six weeks later on August 20, the film had expanded to 18 theaters and grossed $108,620 domestically.

=== Critical reception ===
On the review aggregator Rotten Tomatoes, the film holds an approval rating of 81% based on 47 reviews, with an average rating of 6.54/10. The website's critical consensus reads, "Do I Sound Gay? proves to be a light, affable, entertaining look at a largely unexplored issue". Metacritic, which uses a weighted average, assigned the film a score of 65 out of 100, based on 16 critics, indicating "generally favorable" reviews.

Leslie Felperin writing for The Guardian said that, "the point is inclusiveness, not conclusiveness, and that makes this open, honest and endearingly slapdash work especially interesting". Writing for Variety, Andrew Barker wrote that, "The film does lose its way at times, especially during its long look at the evolution of cinematic gay stereotypes — still a worthwhile subject of study, though one that’s been explored more thoroughly elsewhere — and the ending is a little pat". Sara Stewart of New York Post wrote, "Thorpe does elicit entertaining, thoughtful and sometimes deeply sad insights".

Gary Goldstein of the Los Angeles Times wrote, "Thorpe’s topic might have been better served in a broader-based documentary about LGBT stereotypes than as the basis for an entire film". Danielle Davenport of the One Room With A View said that, "On the whole, Do I Sound Gay? is didactic and empowering, but not overly rigorous; its encouraging premise is not entirely satisfied". Clayton Dillard of Slant Magazine called Do I Sound Gay? "a film that only superficially engages its topic, preferring communal confirmation over more rigorous, troubled grapplings".

=== Accolades ===
The film was first runner-up for the People's Choice Award for Best Documentary at the 2014 Toronto International Film Festival. Do I Sound Gay? won Best Documentary Feature at the 2015 KASHISH Mumbai International Queer Film Festival.

== See also ==
- Gay male speech
