= Roads to Vegas =

- Family Guy episode
- Episode no.: Season 11; Episode 22
- Directed by: Greg Colton
- Written by: Steve Callaghan
- Production code: AACX20
- Original air date: May 19, 2013

Guest appearances
- Alexandra Breckenridge as Woman/Girl in Park #2; Ralph Garman; Gary Janetti; Joe Lomonaco as Weenie; Patrick Meighan; Emily Osment as Tina (Deleted Scenes)/Girl in Park #1/Gambling Teenager/Waitress (DVD Version); Danny Smith; Alec Sulkin; John Viener as The Butt

Episode chronology
← Previous "Farmer Guy"	Next → "No Country Club for Old Men"
- Family Guy season 11

"Roads to Vegas" is the twenty-first episode of the eleventh season, and the 209th overall episode, of Family Guy. It follows Brian and Stewie as they head to Las Vegas using a teleporting machine, which malfunctions and creates clones of themselves. The episode, which is the seventh in the series of Road to... episodes, originally aired on Fox in the United States on May 19, 2013, airing before the episode "No Country Club for Old Men". Together, the two episodes were promoted as being the season finale.

First announced at the 2012 San Diego Comic-Con, the episode was written by Steve Callaghan and directed by Greg Colton. The episode generally received positive reviews from critics upon release. According to Nielsen ratings, it was viewed in 5.28 million homes in its original airing. The episode featured guest performances from Alexandra Breckenridge, Ralph Garman, Gary Janetti, Joe Lomonaco, Patrick Meighan, Emily Osment, Danny Smith, Alec Sulkin, and John Viener.

== Plot ==
At the Quahog Gay Pride Day festivities, in a raffle sponsored by Weenie and the Butt, Brian wins tickets to see Celine Dion in Las Vegas. As they prepare to travel, Stewie convinces Brian to use the new teleportation device he has been working on instead. A flash of light reveals a disappointed Stewie and Brian standing on the device's platform, and they head off to the airport, but they do not realize that the machine produced an identical Brian and Stewie pair who were immediately transported to Vegas. The original Brian and Stewie then travel by plane to Las Vegas. As the duplicate pair check into the Bellagio, their luck makes itself present immediately with duplicate Brian winning a large jackpot at the slot machines. The original Brian and Stewie arrive and find their room has been already taken. As the duplicate pair have the time of their lives with delicious food, great nightlife, and a freshly purchased Ferrari that they use to kill a bunch of people in front of an Ed Hardy store, the original pair find themselves in a third-rate hotel nowhere near the Strip. Trying their luck in the hotel's slot machine, they quickly lose all of the money they brought.

The original Brian is ready to go home but Stewie admits that he already gambled away their plane tickets. Brian admits he cannot call for help after taking money from Lois. Using money they got from a loan shark, they bet on a basketball game and lose again. The duplicated pair accidentally take the empty backpack from the unlucky pair; the original Stewie unknowingly takes the duplicated pair's backpack, which is full of cash.

As the pairs go their separate ways, an enforcer for the loan shark catches up with the duplicate pair (mistaking the clones for the originals) to get the money back and discovers to his fury and their shock that they have no cash. The enforcer orders Brian to either accept his own death or sacrifice Stewie. Brian initially refuses to choose but when he panics, he tells the enforcer to shoot Stewie. A disgusted Stewie is murdered by a gunshot to the head, and the enforcer threatens to kill Brian unless he gets the money by the next day. Meanwhile, the original pair face their impossible situation of being unable to get the money or go back home, and Brian agrees with Stewie's proposal that they commit suicide. They prepare to throw themselves off the top balcony of the hotel but Stewie chickens out at the last second, leaving Brian to fall to his death. A panic-stricken Stewie trips over his backpack and finds the money the other pair had won.

Returning home the next day, the duplicate Brian and original Stewie bump into each other at the bus terminal. Stewie realizes that the device had made clones of themselves. The two deceive each other about how their respective friend's deaths transpired, before the original Stewie, remembering the original Brian's confession about Lois' stolen money, hides it away from the duplicate Brian to stop him from getting greedy and to allow himself to return Lois' money. The two then return home while the duplicate Stewie and original Brian greet each other coldly at the pearly gates of Heaven.

== Production and development ==
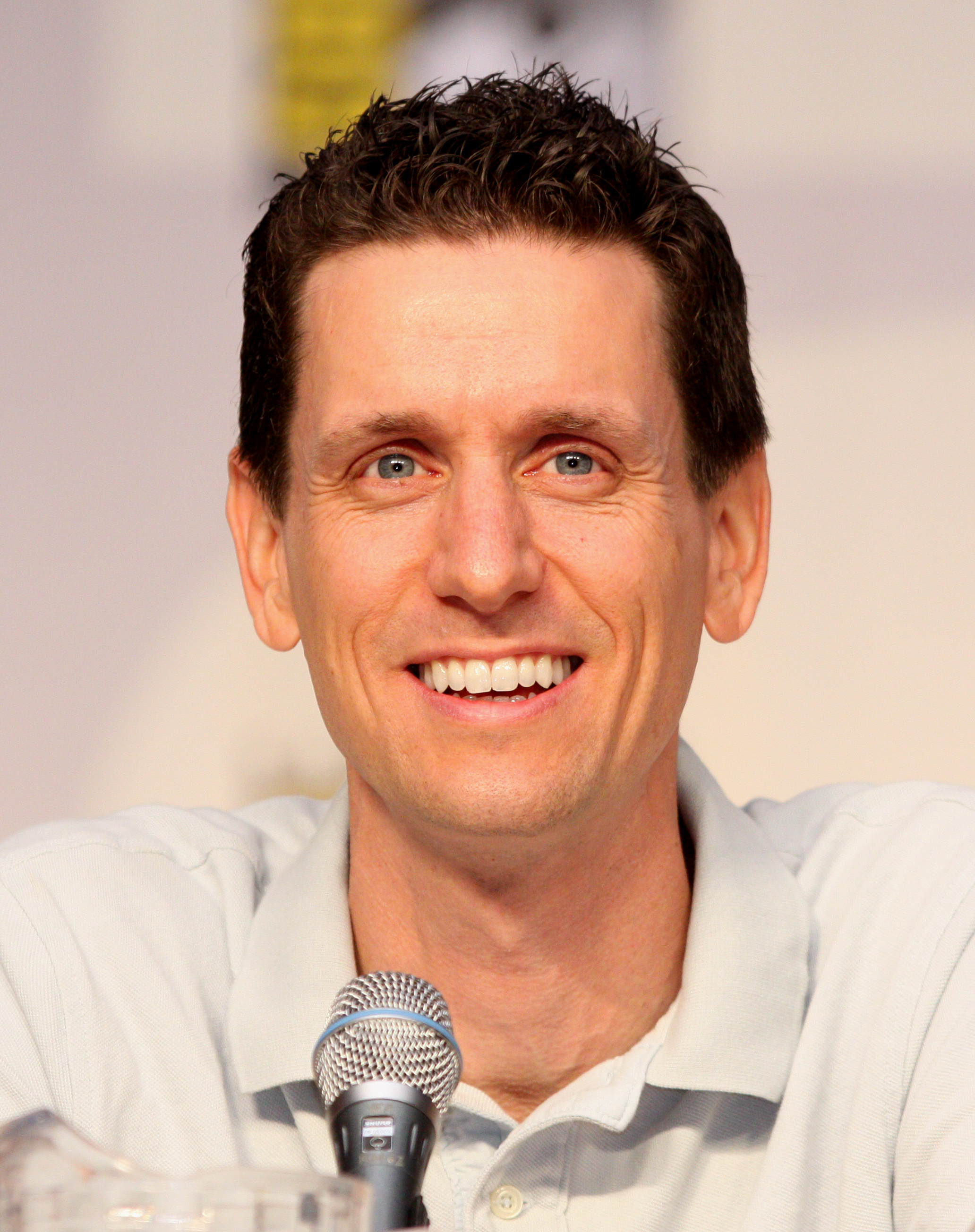
Steve Callaghan wrote the episode.

"Roads to Vegas" is the seventh episode of the series Road to.. hallmark which air through various seasons of the show. The episode was directed by Greg Colton, who previously directed the Road to ... episodes "Road to Germany", "Road to the Multiverse", and "Road to the North Pole". It was written by Family Guy veteran Steve Callaghan. "Roads to Vegas" is Callaghan's first writing credit for a Road to ... episode.

In July 2012, the Family Guy panel first announced the episode at San Diego Comic-Con by giving a brief plot outline. The episode was revealed as the penultimate episode of the series eleventh season, airing before the premiere of "No Country Club for Old Men". Together, the two episodes were promoted as the season finale. On a press release, the Fox Network then officially announced the episode and described it as:

Stewie and Brian use Stewie's time machine to go to Las Vegas for a Bette Midler concert, but chaos ensues when the machine malfunctions and creates alt-versions of the pair: a "lucky" version and an "unlucky" one.

Production of the episode began months in advance according to the episode's writer Steve Callaghan. "We're working over a year ahead of time," Callaghan says in an interview with Hollywood.com. He added "We work so far ahead I can even tell you the finale... the finale is a cool episode called 'Roads to Vegas.' It's like a roadshow and Stewie and Brian teleport themselves to Las Vegas, but in the process [they] unknowingly create a duplicate of one another." In an interview with The Hollywood Reporter, Callaghan recalled the scene in the episode where Brian and Stewie consider joint suicide the most difficult scene for him to write in 2012.

In addition to the regular cast, "Roads to Vegas" featured guest performances from actress Alexandra Breckenridge, actor Ralph Garman, voice actor Joe Lomonaco, and actress and singer Emily Osment. Recurring voice actors and series writers Gary Janetti, Danny Smith, Alec Sulkin, and John Viener also made minor appearances throughout "Roads to Vegas".

== Reception ==
During its original airing, the episode was viewed by a total of 5.28 million viewers according to Nielsen ratings. This made it the most viewed episode to premiere that night on Fox's Animation Domination, edging out two episodes of The Cleveland Show and two episodes of The Simpsons. The episode received a 2.6 rating in the 18–49 demographic.

The episode generally received positive reviews. Kevin McFarland of The A.V. Club gave the episode a B+ and said that it "isn't typically as heavy on the usual stock jokes that weigh the show down, and the adventures of Brian and Stewie drive more interest than most other characters." Carter Dotson of TV Fanatic gave the episode a 4.4 rating and called the episode and its sister episode, "No Country Club for Old Men", "a perfect representation of the wild extremes of this season." He added "it wasn't the funniest episode, but the way the parallel stories worked and intertwined was at least extremely interesting, lacking much of the lazy humor that at times plagued this season. Mark Trammell of TV Equals said "All in all, an okay episode that benefited from the combination approach, but MacFarlane might want to retire both the time travel stuff and the 'road picture'-approach after this one, as the well is clearly running dry ... To tell the truth, I didn't laugh as much as I wanted to".

== See also ==
- List of television shows set in Las Vegas
