= Bigfat =

- Family Guy episode
- Episode no.: Season 11; Episode 18
- Directed by: Julius Wu
- Written by: Brian Scully
- Production code: AACX15
- Original air date: April 14, 2013

Guest appearances
- Mike Judge as Hank Hill; Bill Maher as himself; Wendy Schaal as Francine Smith; Rachael MacFarlane as Hayley Smith; Scott Grimes as Steve Smith

Episode chronology
← Previous "12 and a Half Angry Men"	Next → "Total Recall"
- Family Guy season 11

"Bigfat" is the eighteenth episode of the eleventh season and the 205th overall episode of the animated comedy series Family Guy. It aired on Fox in the United States on April 14, 2013, and is written by Brian Scully and directed by Julius Wu. In the episode, Peter, Quagmire and Joe take a road trip to Canada, but their private plane crashes and Peter goes missing for two months. When his family finds him, he can no longer communicate intelligently.

Though primarily a Family Guy episode, it includes a crossover cold opening with characters from American Dad! and King of the Hill.

== Plot ==
=== Crossover cold opening ===
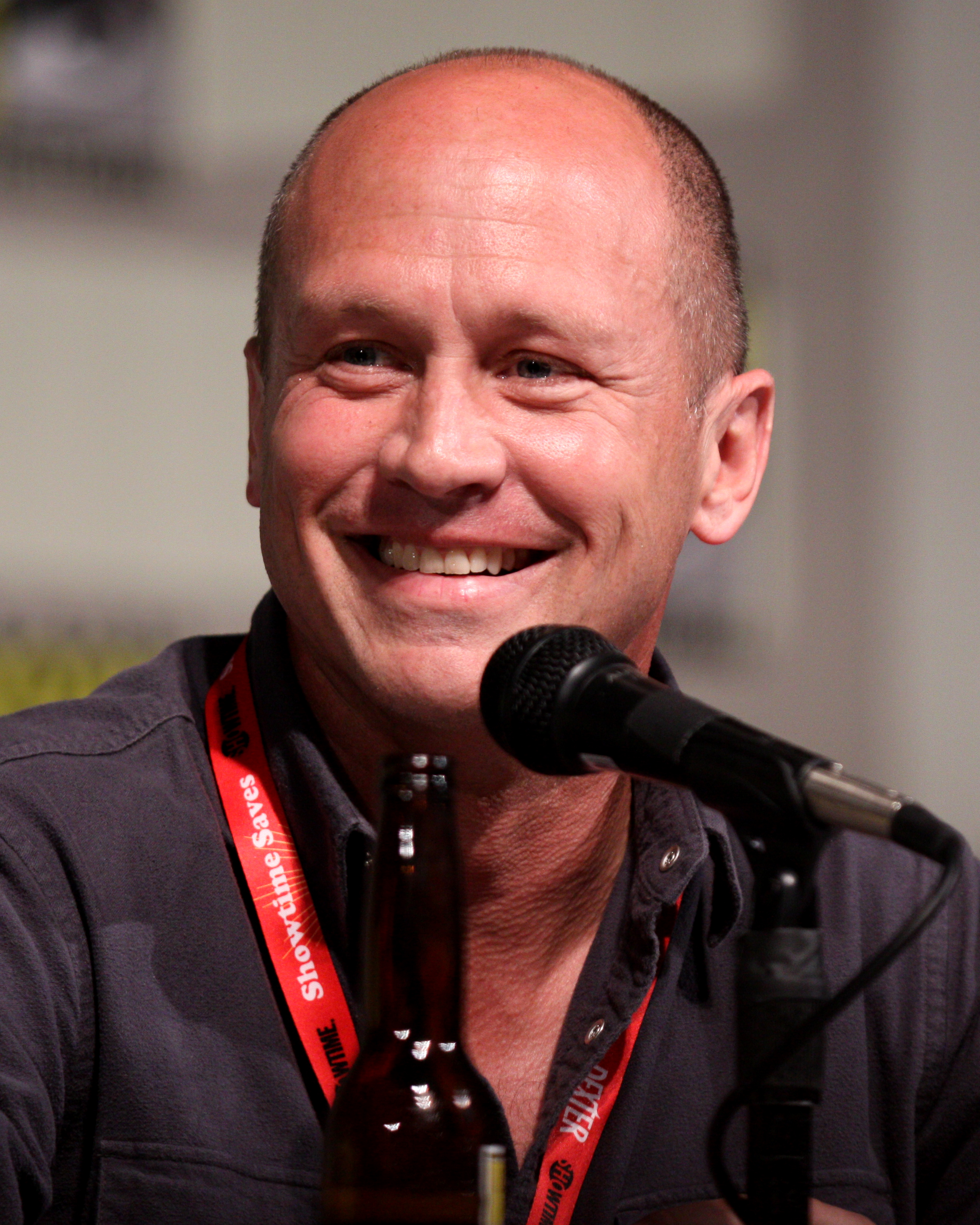
Mike Judge (pictured in 2011) guest voiced character as Hank Hill from his series King of the Hill in a crossover cold open cameo (that also features Seth's sister series American Dad! in the exact same crossover cold open) in his dream sequence.

The episode starts in Quahog when the Griffins visit their new neighbors, the Smiths (from American Dad!), living in Cleveland's old house. Peter is then shot by Stan Smith for revealing Roger's identity to Quagmire over the phone. Peter then wakes up in his bed and discovered it was a dream. At that moment, Hank Hill walks into the bedroom questioning, "Hey, Lois, what's that fat man doing in our bed?". Next, the scene cuts to Hank waking up in his bed saying, "Ugh, damn it, I always wake up before I find out if they can understand the baby." The episode opens with a King of the Hill-styled opening involving Quagmire, Peter, Joe, and Brian replacing Boomhauer, Hank, Bill, and Dale at their respective spots in "The Alley".

=== Main plot ===
Quagmire asks the guys to come along with him on a trip to some Montreal strip clubs (Peter says he's always wanted to go there, but says he couldn't because South Park already went there). Quagmire asks that they lie about where they are going in order to keep the wives from complaining to him about going to strip clubs.

On the private luxury plane Quagmire acquires by "catching John Travolta with not Kelly Preston", Peter reenacts The Twilight Zone episode "Nightmare at 20,000 Feet", opening a door and causing the plane to crash in the Canadian wilderness. They build shelter and settle in for the night. Thanks to one of Peter's animal traps, Quagmire's legs get broken. With Peter the only able-bodied person left, he sets out to find help. But just after he leaves, they find out that they crashed into a Canadian's back yard. Quagmire worries about Peter, but he has already disappeared into the woods as confirmed by the Predator that had been watching them.

Two months later, the Search and Rescue Party nearly gives up the search when signs of Peter start to turn up. The family rushes to where Peter left a doll of Edna Garrett from The Facts of Life (though Chris also reminds everyone that Edna Garrett was first seen in Diff'rent Strokes) and find him in the bushes acting like a nonspeaking feral beast with long hair, a long beard, a partially muddy body, and wearing what's left of his underwear.

Getting Peter home, they try to reintroduce him to his life. Lois then shows Peter a video that he made before he became feral. When it comes to the second tape, the Peter on that tape tells Peter not to listen to the Peter on the first video since that Peter is lying and tells Peter to be free as he runs out of the house. Stewie tries to make the best of things by singing with Peter where he grunts to the tunes of "War" and "Baby Got Back." Lois awakes to find Peter in the garbage. Quagmire and Joe come over to check on things and find that every attempt to re-civilize Peter did not go well. The Griffin family decides to return Peter to the wild to be happy. As Lois and the family cries at their departure, Peter heads off towards the woods. But when Meg says goodbye, Peter struggles to tell Meg to shut up and slowly regains his speech. Peter and Lois embrace, he then tells her "Jim. Your name is Jim" (an allusion to the end of Star Trek III: The Search for Spock).

At home and returned to normal in only a day, Peter announces that Quagmire is taking him to a strip club in Montreal to celebrate Peter returning to normal. At the strip club, Peter is surprised to see Charlotte Rae (the actress who portrayed Edna Garrett) as a stripper.

== Reception ==
The episode received a 2.5 rating in the 18-49 demographic and was watched by a total of 5.02 million viewers. This made it the most watched show on Fox's Animation Domination line-up that night, beating The Simpsons, American Dad!, Bob's Burgers and The Cleveland Show. The episode was met with mixed reviews from critics. Kevin McFarland of The A.V. Club gave the episode a C, saying "Bigfat" is one of those consistently funny episodes brought down by too much Meg-bashing. Mark Trammell of TV Equals said "All in all, a good but not great episode that had the makings of a classic, but faltered in the end. If you’re a fan of the older style of "Family Guy" humor, you'll at least want to see the first bit of the episode, but be forewarned, it doesn't get any better than that." Carter Dotson of TV Fanatic gave the episode three out of five stars, saying "Peter going feral didn't really last long enough, nor had any great comic consequences. It just wasn't nearly as funny as it could or should have been, minus perhaps Peter getting his humanity back by way of wanting Meg to shut up. It all felt like an extremely-missed opportunity. It was all half-baked. Survival was a theme in the Family Guy Season 11 premiere. Most of the jokes felt like lazy references that should have gone further than they did. None of the plot threads were given any room to develop. This could have been a lot better than it turned out to be, but instead was just mostly mediocre. Still, it had the King of the Hill homage, which justified the whole half-hour."
