= Total Recall (Family Guy) =

- Family Guy episode
- Episode no.: Season 11; Episode 18
- Directed by: Joseph Lee
- Written by: Kristin Long
- Production code: AACX16
- Original air date: April 28, 2013

Guest appearance
- Carly Simon as herself

Episode chronology
← Previous "Bigfat"	Next → "Save the Clam"
- Family Guy season 11

"Total Recall" is the eighteenth episode of the eleventh season and the 206th overall episode of the animated comedy series Family Guy. It aired on Fox in the United States on April 28, 2013, and is written by Kristin Long and directed by Joseph Lee. In the episode, after Rupert is recalled, Stewie and Brian head on an adventure to reclaim Stewie's best friend. Meanwhile, due to illness, Peter is replaced by Lois in his bowling tournament. However, he begins to get annoyed by the brewing friendship between his wife and his buddies.

== Plot ==
Peter comes down with a cold that alters and deepens his voice, which Lois finds to be a turn-on. After they make love, Peter goes to his bowling match. When he recovers, Peter loses his sexy voice and decides to fall ill again to regain it. After repeated attempts, he manages to get deathly ill. Peter ends up in the hospital and is thus unable to go to his bowling tournament, so he enlists a reluctant Lois to take his place. The guys have some reservations but Lois does remarkably well, winning the game for the guys. Celebrating at The Drunken Clam, Lois joins in the guys' sex talk, whilst making a rather bold reference to her bisexuality, saying that she would have sex with Scarlett Johansson. Joe surprises everyone with three tickets to a Red Sox game just as Peter shows up to join them and they point out they do not have a ticket for him, preferring to take Lois. After the game, Peter confronts Lois about hanging out with his friends, lamenting that they are all he has. Peter joins the others but finds his jealousy and desperation leaves him out of the group. As Lois feels bad for him, she decides to help Peter regain his place, turning down a night out to allow Peter to rejoin his friends.

Meanwhile, the New England Toy & Game Company recalls the teddy bears for the eyes potentially coming loose and Lois sends Rupert back. When Stewie finds him missing, Brian tells him what happened and shows him the replacement toy giraffe they sent which Stewie rejects. Stewie decides to go to the factory and retrieve Rupert at all costs and enlists Brian's help. They slip into the factory on a tour and find the recall room, only to realize there are thousands of identical bears. As Stewie despairs of ever finding the real Rupert, he spots a conveyor belt loading the bears into a furnace and discovers the real Rupert. Stewie gains access to the belt and makes his way to Rupert. As Rupert nearly falls in, Stewie grabs him and tries to retreat off the belt himself before falling in. Brian tries failed toy after failed toy until he manages to stop the belt and Stewie is reunited for good. As Stewie celebrates getting Rupert back, one of Rupert's eyes pops off and into Stewie's mouth, choking him until he suffocates.

== Cultural references ==
The opening credits are a direct parody of ABC's Modern Family. The scene where Stewie rescues Rupert from the incinerator is similar to a scene in Toy Story 3. The title is a reference to Arnold Schwarzenegger's film Total Recall.

== Reception ==
The episode received a 2.6 rating in the 18-49 demographic and was watched by a total of 4.89 million viewers. This made it the most watched show on Fox's Animation Domination line-up that night, beating The Simpsons, American Dad!, Bob's Burgers and The Cleveland Show. The episode was met with mixed reviews from critics. Kevin McFarland of The A.V. Club gave the episode a C−, saying "The B-plot is much more light-hearted and fun and far less problematic. Stewie and Brian go on a mission to rescue Rupert, who has been recalled by the toy company that manufactures the teddy bear due to the choking hazard of easily detachable eyes. There were many different ways this could have gone, from an entire episode devoted to an extensive, far-reaching search, to a Willy Wonka-style romp around a toy factory, but buried in this episode as the other story the beats play out in predictable fashion. We’re already getting another “Road To…” episode this season, so a romp through a toy factory taking over an episode probably seemed like too much for one year." Carter Dotson of TV Fanatic gave the episode four out of five stars, saying "This won't go down as an all-time great in the show's canon; the Modern Family intro parody felt weak and there was still a lot of lazy humor, but it'll be a solid way to pass time when the episode airs in syndication and I invariably see it a million times on Adult Swim."

Mark Trammell of TV Equals said "Given some people’s complaints that the show was losing touch with what made them like it in the first place, this one should have hit the target for the most part, playing like a classic episode of the show. Though I appreciated the attempt to steer things away from that sort of thing in favor of more original jokes, I have to admit, I laughed more at this episode than I have in some time. For that matter, I just plain enjoyed it more, storyline-wise."
