= Save the Clam =

- Family Guy episode
- Episode no.: Season 11; Episode 19
- Directed by: Brian Iles
- Written by: Chris Sheridan
- Production code: AACX18
- Original air date: May 5, 2013

Guest appearances
- Tim Gunn as himself; Alexandra Breckenridge as Amanda Small; Emily Osment as Joanie Cunningham/JoAnne Fuller; Rhea Seehorn as Female Baseball Player's Friend; Fred Tatasciore as Kathleen Turner/Archie Manning

Episode chronology
← Previous "Total Recall"	Next → "Farmer Guy"
- Family Guy season 11

"Save the Clam" is the nineteenth episode of the eleventh season and the 207th overall episode of the animated comedy series Family Guy. It aired on Fox in the United States on May 5, 2013, and is written by Chris Sheridan and directed by Brian Iles. The episode's plot revolves around Peter and his friends trying to save Quahog’s local bar, The Drunken Clam, from being closed down after the owner Horace is killed in a freak accident during a ball game.

== Plot ==
During a softball match between the Drunken Clam and Goldman's Pharmacy, Jerome is brought in as a player for Mort's team. To win the game, Horace attempts to strike Jerome out. Unfortunately, Jerome hits the ball so hard it accidentally flies into Horace's face and fractures his skull, killing him. During the funeral, Jerome expresses to Peter how awful he feels about it, noting that Horace was a good bartender and good person and wishes that there was something he could do. But Peter assures Jerome that he's not upset with him, acknowledging that he never meant it. After the funeral, the guys go to drink at The Drunken Clam to pay their respects to Horace only to find the bar has been foreclosed. The guys are forced to drink at Peter's house, but after Lois objects, they sneak back into the Clam for a night of drinking. The next morning, they find the Clam is about to be demolished & Peter demands they stop as he claims ownership of the bar. During the stand-off, Jerome suddenly appears and reveals that he used his sports earnings from playing lacrosse (which is also his brother's name) to buy The Drunken Clam so he can keep it open to honor Horace's legacy and redeem himself for what he did. The trio find the Drunken Clam modified by Jerome and then they are relegated to a space on the floor near a pile of garbage since there are three black guys in their usual booth.

In a sub plot, during Horace's funeral, Meg leaves to use the bathroom and accidentally stumbles into an embalming session. Impressed by her lack of squeamishness, the undertaker offers her a job at the funeral home. Soon, Chris shows up after being locked out of the house without a key and plays with the deceased bodies to Meg's annoyance. When she goes to dress the body of Mr. Dugan, she finds it is missing and discovers that Chris stole the body, using it to get into "R" rated movies until it fell apart in a swimming pool. Due to Meg and Chris being unable to find Dugan's body parts, the former forces the latter to pose as Dugan during the funeral despite him having itchy testicles. As they progress, they learn from Dugan's wife, Helen, that the deceased face is to be donated for a transplant to a woman who lost her face in a freak chimpanzee accident. Chris becomes furious at Meg for the loss of his own face, now unable to frown due to the transplant.

== Reception ==
The episode received a 2.2 rating in the 18-49 demographic and was watched by a total of 4.79 million viewers. This made it the second most watched show on Fox's Animation Domination line-up that night, beating The Simpsons and Bob's Burgers but losing to American Dad!. The episode was met with mixed reviews from critics. Kevin McFarland of The A.V. Club gave the episode a B, saying "That’s a pretty standard way to appreciate anything that Family Guy does these days, tuning out the deliberately provocative jokes as though they're comments made by an older relative at Thanksgiving who gets a pass because they 'grew up in a different time.' Family Guy doesn't have that excuse, so when the material doesn't work because it trades in lazy stereotypes, it hurts the episode. Still, I laughed more this week at the remaining bits than I have in a few months." Carter Dotson of TV Fanatic gave the episode three out of five stars, saying "This was a rather pedestrian episode of the show, not a classic but not terrible. If your DVR didn't record it, you didn't miss much."
