= Q Link Wireless =

American telecommunications company

- Type: Division
- Industry: Wireless Telecommunications
- Founded: 2011; 15 years ago
- Defunct: 2024
- Fate: Merged into StandUP Wireless
- Headquarters: Dania, Florida, U.S.
- Area served: United States
- Website: http://qlinkwireless.com/ (Archived November 18, 2024)

Q Link Wireless was an American telecommunications company based in Dania, Florida that provided free wireless services to Lifeline eligible consumers. The company also offered prepaid mobile phone services including wireless voice, messaging, and data services under the Hello Mobile brand.

Q Link Wireless was one of multiple companies owned and operated under Quadrant Holdings, and was founded in 2011.

== Provided service ==
Q Link Wireless provided service for low-income-eligible individuals, funded through the Universal Service Fund. The company also offered general phone plans. Proper checks were not performed by the company, and free phones and services were handed out to nearly anyone who applied, regardless of their personal and household income levels. Q Link didn't check and didn't care if their "customers" actually qualified as low income. Many customers hadn't sent in or verified proof of income or participation in any government programs for years, yet continued to receive free cell services. Q Link continued to embezzle hundreds of millions of tax payer dollars, which their corporate department treated as income, and lived lavish, luxury lifestyles, buying yachts, mansions, super cars, and anything imaginable. The scam was in full swing, and Q Link was living the dream, stealing hundreds of millions from the United States government annually.

== Eligibility requirements ==
Q Link Wireless offered free or discounted service to eligible Americans who are currently enrolled in a government benefit program or meet certain low-income requirements for their state. Government benefit programs that meet qualifications are standard and set by FCC. but commonly include Food Stamps (Supplemental Nutrition Assistance Program), Medicaid, and Supplemental Security Income.

== Legal issues ==
On June 9, 2021, the company's Florida headquarters was raided by the United States Postal Inspection Service in connection to an undisclosed ongoing investigation. On October 15, 2024, the U.S. Attorney's Office in the Southern District of Florida announced that Q Link Wireless LLC had pleaded guilty to “conspiring to defraud and commit offenses (…) in connection with a years-long scheme to steal over $100 million” from the Lifeline federal program. The CEO was sentenced to five years in jail and the company shut down.

== See also ==
- Assurance Wireless
