= Gay male speech =

Speech characteristics common among gay men

Speech example
Audio of Matteo Lane speaking on his experiences as a gay comedian. Lane has described himself as having "gay voice."

Gay male speech has been the focus of numerous modern stereotypes, as well as sociolinguistic studies, particularly within North American English. Scientific research has uncovered phonetically significant features produced by many gay men and demonstrated that listeners accurately guess speakers' sexual orientation at rates greater than chance. Historically, gay male speech characteristics have been highly stigmatized, so that such features were often reduced in certain settings, such as the workplace.

Research does not support the notion that gay speech entirely adopts mainstream feminine speech characteristics — rather, that it selectively adopts some of those features. There are similarities between gay male speech and the speech of other members within the LGBTQ+ community. Features of lesbian speech have also been confirmed in the 21st century, though they are far less socially noticed than features of gay male speech. Drag queen speech is a further topic of research and, while some drag queens may also identify as gay men, a description of their speech styles may not be so gender binary (gay versus straight). As with other marginalized communities, speech codes can be deeply tied to local, intimate communities and/or subcultures.

== North American English ==
Linguists have attempted to isolate exactly what makes gay men's English distinct from that of other demographics since the early 20th century, typically by contrasting it with straight male speech or comparing it to female speech. In older work, speech pathologists often focused on high pitch among men, in its resemblance to women, as a defect. Since the gay community consists of many smaller subcultures, gay male speech does not uniformly fall under a single homogeneous category.

=== Gay "lisp" ===
Whistled and long

◌͎ː

What is sometimes colloquially described as a gay "lisp" is one manner of speech associated with some homosexual males who speak English, and perhaps other languages too. It involves a marked pronunciation of sibilant consonants (particularly /s/ and /z/). Speech scientist Benjamin Munson and his colleagues have argued that this is not a mis-articulated /s/ (and therefore, not technically a lisp) as much as a hyper-articulated /s/. Specifically, gay men are documented as pronouncing /s/ with higher-frequency spectral peaks, an extremely negatively skewed spectrum, and a longer duration than heterosexual men. However, not all gay American men speak with this hyper-articulated /s/ (perhaps fewer than half), and some heterosexual men also produce this feature.

=== Vowels ===
A 2006 study of gay men in the Upper Midwestern American dialect region found that they tend to lower the TRAP vowel (except before a nasal consonant) as well as the DRESS vowel. This linguistic phenomenon is normally associated with the California vowel shift and also reported in a study of a gay speaker of California English itself, who strengthened these same features and also fronted the goose and goat vowels when speaking with friends more than in other speaking situations. The study suggests that a California regional sound can be employed or intensified by gay American men for stylistic effect, including to evoke a "fun" or "partier" persona.

=== Other characteristics ===
Some other speech features are also stereotyped as markers of gay or bisexual males: carefully enunciated pronunciation, wide pitch range (high and rapidly changing pitch), breathy voice, lengthened fricative sounds, pronunciation of /t/ as /ts/ and /d/ as /dz/ (affrication), etc. Research shows that gay speech characteristics include many of the same characteristics other speakers use when attempting to speak with special carefulness or clarity, including over-articulating and expanding the vowel spaces in the mouth.

=== Perception ===
In terms of perception, the "gay sound" in North American English is popularly presumed to involve the pronunciation of sibilants (/s/, /z/, /ʃ/) with noticeable assibilation, sibilation, hissing, or stridency. Frontal, dentalized and negatively skewed articulations of /s/ (the aforementioned "gay lisp") are indeed found to be the most powerful perceptual indicators to a listener of a male speaker's sexual orientation, with experiments revealing that such articulations are perceived as "gayer-sounding" and "younger-sounding". So even if a speaker does not display all of these patterns, the stereotype of gay speech and the coordination of other non-linguistic factors, e.g. dress, mannerisms, can help form the perception of these accents in speech.

Gay speech is also widely stereotyped as resembling women's speech. However, on the basis of phonetics, Benjamin Munson and his colleagues' research has discovered that gay male speech does not simply or categorically imitate female speech.

In one Canadian study, listeners correctly identified gay speakers in 62% of cases. A Stanford University experiment analyzed the acoustics of eight males (four straight and four gay), who were recorded reading passages, through the perception of listener-subjects and tasked these listeners with categorizing speakers by adjectives corresponding to common U.S. stereotypes of gay men. The listeners were generally able to correctly identify the sexual orientation of the speakers, reflecting the stereotypes. However, there were no statistically significant differences the listeners identified, if they existed at all, based on intonation. These findings are representative of other studies as well.

Another study examined the duration of certain sounds (/æ/, /eɪ/, and the onset of /s/ and /l/), frequency of stressed vowels, voice-onset time of voiceless aspirated consonants, and the release of word-final stop consonants. The study found some correlation between these speech traits and sexual orientation, but also clarified the study's narrow scope on only certain phonetic features.

=== Other scholars' views ===
Language and gender scholar Robin Lakoff not only compares gay male with female speech but also claims that gay men deliberately imitate the latter, claiming this to include an increased use of superlatives, inflected intonation, and lisping. Later linguists have re-evaluated Lakoff's claims and concluded that these characterizations are not consistent for women, instead reflecting stereotypes that may have social meaning and importance but that do not fully capture actual gendered language use.

Linguist David Crystal correlated the use among men of an "effeminate" or "simpering" voice with a widened range of pitch, glissando effects between stressed syllables, greater use of fall-rise and rise-fall tones, vocal breathiness and huskiness, and occasionally more switching to the falsetto register. Still, research has not confirmed any unique intonation or pitch qualities of gay speech. Some such characteristics have been portrayed as mimicking women's speech and judged as derogatory toward or trivializing of women.

== Other languages ==
A study of over 300 Flemish Dutch-speaking Belgian participants, men and women, found a "significantly higher prevalence" of a "lisp"-like feature in gay men than in other demographics. Several studies have also examined and confirmed gay speech characteristics in Puerto Rican Spanish and other dialects of Caribbean Spanish. Despite some similarities in "gay-sounding" speech found cross-linguistically, phonetic features that cue listener perception of "gayness" are likely to be language-dependent and language-specific, and a feature that is attributed to "gayness" in one linguistic variety or language may not have the same indexical meaning in a different linguistic variety or language. For example, a study from 2015 comparing "gay-sounding" speech in German and Italian finds slightly different acoustic cues for the languages, as well as different extents of the correlation of "gay-sounding" speech to gender-atypical-sounding speech.

Gay male speech is not uniform across languages and cultures. Acoustic features associated with "gayness" differ by language due to phonetic norms and cultural contexts regarding stereotypes. English listeners tend to associate phonetic features like a fronted /s/ with gay speech in English, as well as in unfamiliar languages including French, German, and Estonian. However, French and German listeners do not relate fronted /s/ with "gayness" or effeminacy in their own languages or others, despite the feature being present in the gay male speech production of these languages. The difference is interpreted as follows: while the fronted /s/ is a strong social stereotype in English, it acts more as a "marker" below social awareness in French and German. This signifies how stereotypes regarding linguistic features related to sexuality and gay male speech vary culturally, where listeners' unconscious awareness and the attached meaning attributed to being gay are language-specific.

Gay male speech in the Philippines, more commonly referred to as Gay Lingo, is a combination of English, Filipino, and other languages like the Bicol dialectal schema, with some linguistic adjustments, such as affixation. As languages evolve through time, the gay lingo has infiltrated into the common conventional language, with some heterosexual males applying some gay slang into their own vocabulary. This shows how, even though words may originate from gay lexicons, they cannot be evidence for stereotyping a person as an absolute gay male if used, since there is a wider audience in the Philippines.

== See also ==
- List of fictional gay characters
- Do I Sound Gay?
- Gaydar
- LGBT linguistics
- LGBT stereotypes
- Linguistic profiling § Gender and sexual orientation
- Lisp
- Polari
- Swish (slang)
