= Hannah Jeter =

United States Virgin Islander model

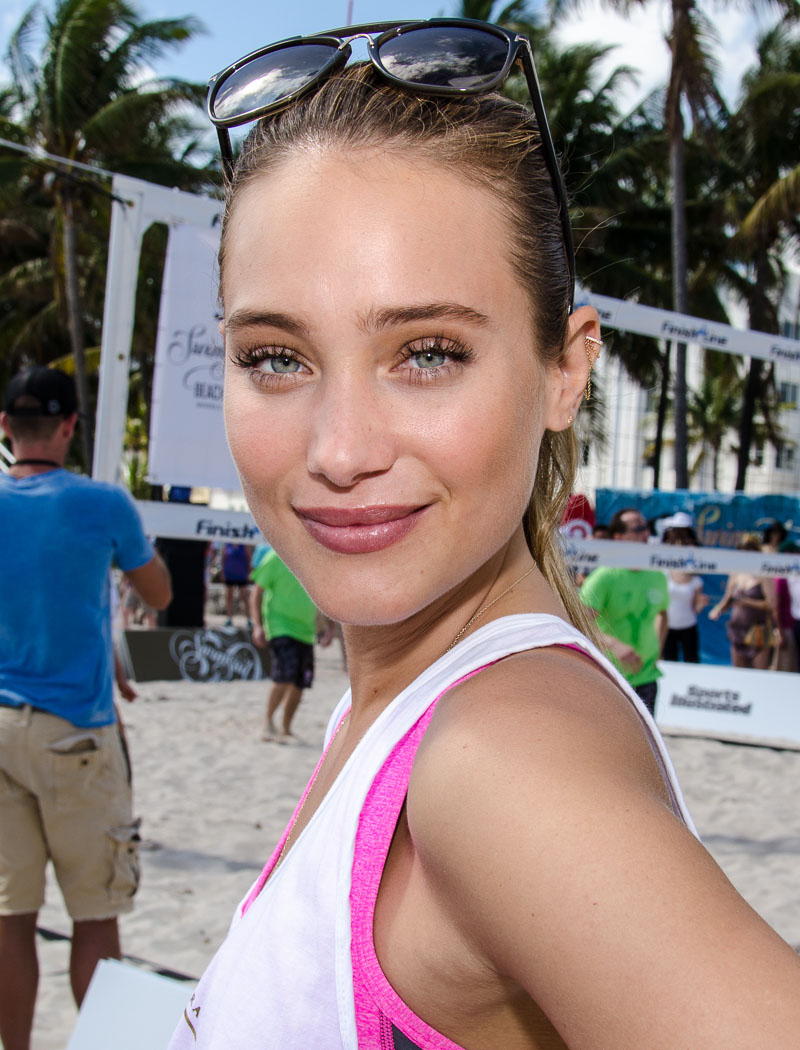
- Jeter in 2014
- Born: May 5, 1990 (age 36); St. Thomas, U.S. Virgin Islands
- Spouse: Derek Jeter (m. 2016)
- Children: 4
- Relatives: Glenn Davis (uncle)
- Modeling information
- Height: 5 ft 8 1/2 in (1.74 m)
- Hair color: Light Brown
- Eye color: Green
- Agency: IMG Models (worldwide); Unique Models (Copenhagen); Ginny Edwards Maxwell (mother agent); MIKAs (Stockholm)

Hannah Jeter (née Davis; born May 5, 1990) is a St. Thomian born-American model and television host best known for her appearances in the Sports Illustrated Swimsuit Issue, including the cover of the 2015 edition.

== Early life ==
Hannah Davis was born and raised on Saint Thomas, in the U.S. Virgin Islands, the youngest of three children of Deborah (née Behm) and Conn Davis. She stated that the best part of growing up there was "the friendly people, great weather and waking up to the sound of the waves on the beach". Her mother is Irish, German, and Scottish, while her father is Italian, Syrian, English, and distantly Jamaican.

== Career ==
Professionally, Jeter appeared in campaigns for Ralph Lauren, Blue Label and walked in their 2006 Spring/Summer runway show. She was additionally the face of the Ralph Lauren fragrance, Ralph Rocks.

Jeter appeared on two individual covers for the Italian magazine D in 2006, Mexico's Elle in August 2009, France's FHM in September 2012 and South Africa's FHM in April 2013.

She modeled for Victoria's Secret as well as American Eagle Outfitters, Tommy Hilfiger, and Levi's. Jeter has appeared in televised advertisements as the DirecTV Genie, and appears in a series of ads for the same company.

Jeter appeared in five editions of the Sports Illustrated Swimsuit Issue, from 2013 to 2017, and was the cover model of the 2015 issue.

In 2015, she appeared in a bit part in the comedy film Vacation, as a flirtatious young woman driving a red Ferrari.

She hosted Project Runway: Junior from 2015 to 2017.

Jeter was first professionally billed under her married name in August 2016.

== Personal life ==
Jeter has played tennis since she was eight years old and was a champion on the Caribbean National tennis team and played on the Caribbean Tennis Circuit. She is the niece of sportscaster Glenn Davis.

In early November 2015, former New York Yankees shortstop Derek Jeter confirmed earlier reports that he and Hannah were engaged. The two married on July 9, 2016, in Napa Valley. They have three daughters, born in August 2017, January 2019, and December 2021, and a son born in May 2023.

Jeter experienced high-risk pregnancies with her first two children, which resulted in an emergency hysterectomy after the birth of her second child. She used intermittent fasting as a weight loss method after the birth of her children.

== Filmography ==
Film
Year	Title	Role	Notes
2015	Vacation	The Girl in the Red Ferrari	

Television
Year	Title	Role	Notes
2009–2010	Rush	Baby G / Gigi	3 episodes
2015	Project Runway	Herself / Judge	Episode: "Mad Dash Mayhem"
2016	Hollywood Game Night	Herself / Celebrity Player	Episode: "Oh Yes, It's Ladies Night"
2015–2017	Project Runway: Junior	Herself / Host	20 episodes
2017	The Rachael Ray Show	Herself	Episode: "Make Your Monday Failproof"
2017	Extra	Herself	8 episodes
2022	The Captain	Herself	Sports documentary
