= Christian Siriano =

American fashion designer (born 1985)

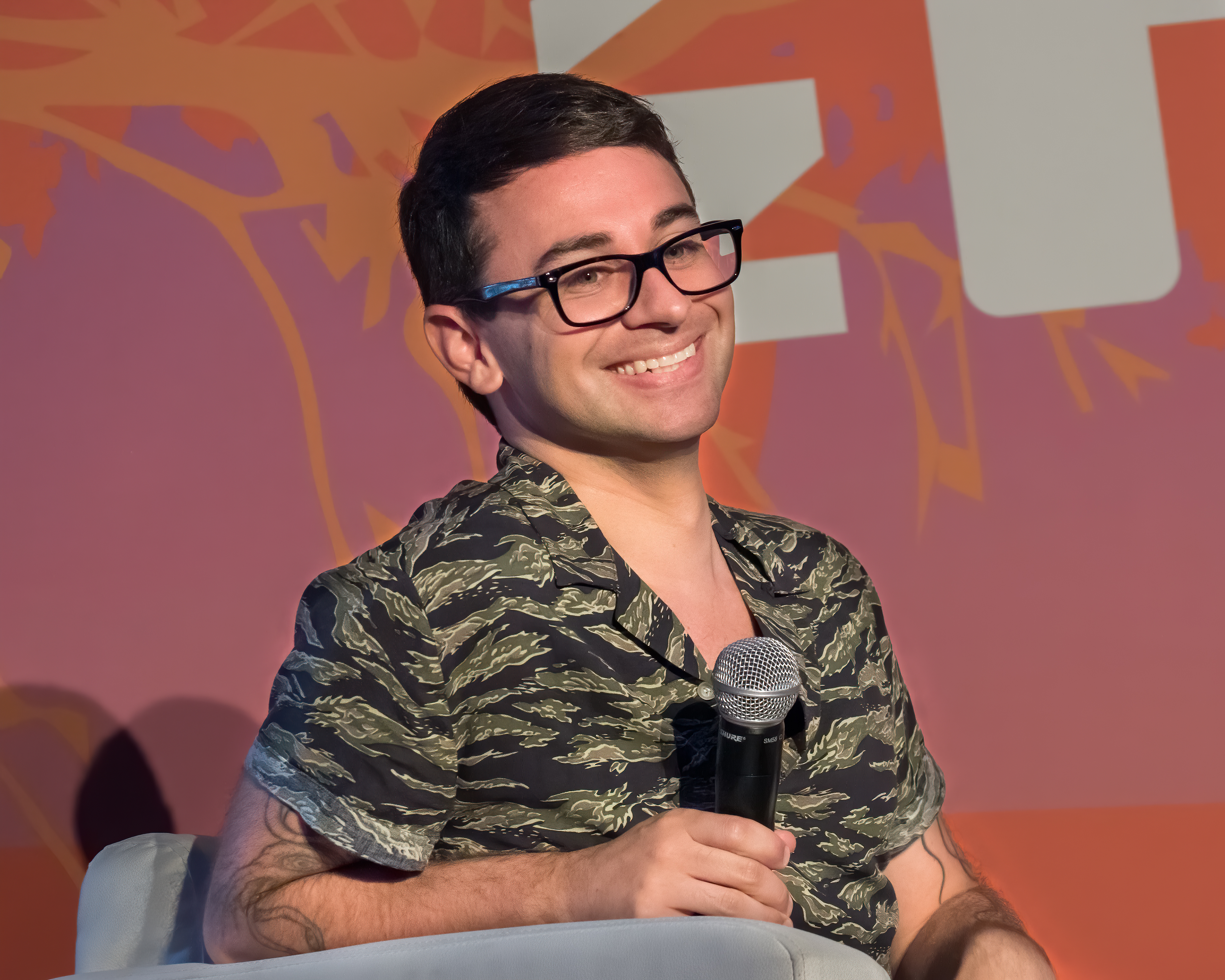
- Siriano at Ozy Fest in July 2018
- Born: November 18, 1985 (age 40); Annapolis, Maryland, U.S.
- Education: American InterContinental University
- Occupation: Fashion designer
- Label: Christian Siriano
- Spouse: Brad Walsh (m. 2016; sep. 2018)

Christian Vincent Siriano (born November 18, 1985) is an American fashion designer and member of the Council of Fashion Designers of America. Siriano first gained attention after winning the fourth season of American design competition show Project Runway in 2007, becoming the series' youngest winner. He launched his eponymous Christian Siriano collection in 2008, which brought in revenue of over $1.2 million by 2010 and was estimated to have reached $5 million by 2012.

Siriano was included in Time magazine's 100 Most Influential People of 2018.

== Early life ==
Siriano was born and raised in Annapolis, Maryland, where he spent a year at Broadneck Senior High School before transferring to Baltimore School for the Arts. The school allowed Siriano to choose fashion design as his course of study. He has one older sister, Shannon, who is a community builder and founder of Rebelle Con. They are of Italian and German descent.

Siriano has said that his parents supported the arts and encouraged him and his sister to pursue creative fields. As a child, Siriano studied ballet, and on a March 2008 Ellen appearance, he described himself as a "musical theater kid who loved costumes". Siriano's interest in costume design inspired him to pursue a career in fashion. He began designing clothes at age thirteen, while working as a hair washer and styling assistant at Bubbles Salon in Annapolis, and eventually began sewing clothes for the salon's annual hair shows.

After being rejected by the Fashion Institute of Technology, Siriano chose to study abroad at American InterContinental University in London, England. Following the recommendation of a teacher during his senior year, he began interning at Vivienne Westwood, and later, at Alexander McQueen, who Siriano has stated was his favorite designer. Siriano moved to New York City after graduating from college.

== Career ==
=== 2007: Project Runway ===
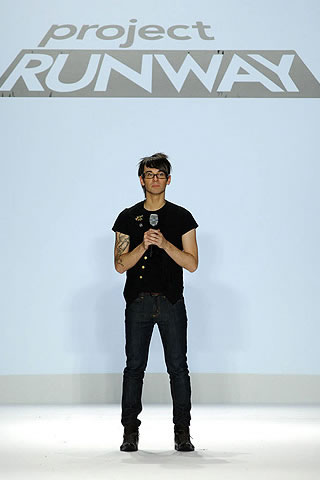
Siriano during the 2008 Project Runway finale

Before auditioning for Project Runway, Siriano worked as a freelance make-up artist and made wedding gowns for private clients while also holding a brief intern position at Marc Jacobs. He decided to audition for the show after the suggestion of a friend's mother. During his time on the fourth season of Project Runway, he won three challenges, the most of any contestant that season. Siriano advanced to the show's finals, and won a spot to show a twelve-piece final collection at New York Fashion Week. His collection was made up of Musketeer-inspired couture, featuring ruffles, feathers and headwear. During the finale, which aired on March 5, 2008, celebrity guest judge Victoria Beckham praised Siriano's collection as being a "breath of fresh air" and stated that she would be "honored to wear" any piece of his clothing. As the winner, he was awarded a fashion spread in Elle magazine, a 2008 Saturn Astra, and US$100,000 to start his own fashion label. He was the youngest designer to win the competition. Siriano returned to the show to mentor designers in seasons 17 (2019), 18 (2019), 19 (2021), 20 (2023), 21 (2025), and 22 (2026).

=== 2008–2013: Label launch and early collaborations ===
In 2008, shortly before debuting his fashion line, Siriano began collaborating on several mass market retail collections. In April 2008, Siriano designed a fifteen-piece collection for athleisure label Puma. On December 4, 2008, it was announced that Siriano had signed a deal to design a line of low-cost shoes and handbags for Payless ShoeSource for retail in fall 2009.

Siriano's eponymous fashion line, Christian Siriano, debuted at New York Fashion Week on September 13, 2008. His collection is retailed at Saks Fifth Avenue and Neiman Marcus. In February 2009, Siriano teamed up with LG to create a fashion-themed phone, the LG Lotus (LX600). That April, Women's Wear Daily announced that Siriano had partnered with Victoria's Secret to retail his own makeup line, "Christian Siriano for VS Makeup". He also contributed limited-edition designs to Starbucks and O-Cel-O. In 2010, Siriano was named one of Crain's Top 40 Entrepreneurs Under 40, which reported that his line had brought in over $1.2 million in revenue as of 2010.

In February 2011, Siriano launched a limited collection for catalog retailer Spiegel, named "Christian Siriano for Spiegel." Siriano was the first designer chosen for the catalog's designer collaborations line, "Signature Styles." Siriano's line at Payless expanded in 2011, when he signed on to release four collections for the chain annually, including a higher priced "Gold Collection." In 2012 the New York Times estimated his label's revenue at around $5 million. In September 2012, the first Christian Siriano flagship store was opened on Elizabeth Street in Manhattan's Nolita neighborhood. The store launch included celebrity guests like Heidi Klum, Allison Williams from HBO series Girls, stylist Brad Goreski, and DJs The Misshapes.

In January 2013 Siriano launched a limited collection of affordable dresses, separates, and accessories for the Home Shopping Network, "Striking by Christian Siriano." Siriano was inducted into the Council of Fashion Designers of America in June 2013, after having been rejected in 2011.

=== 2013–present ===
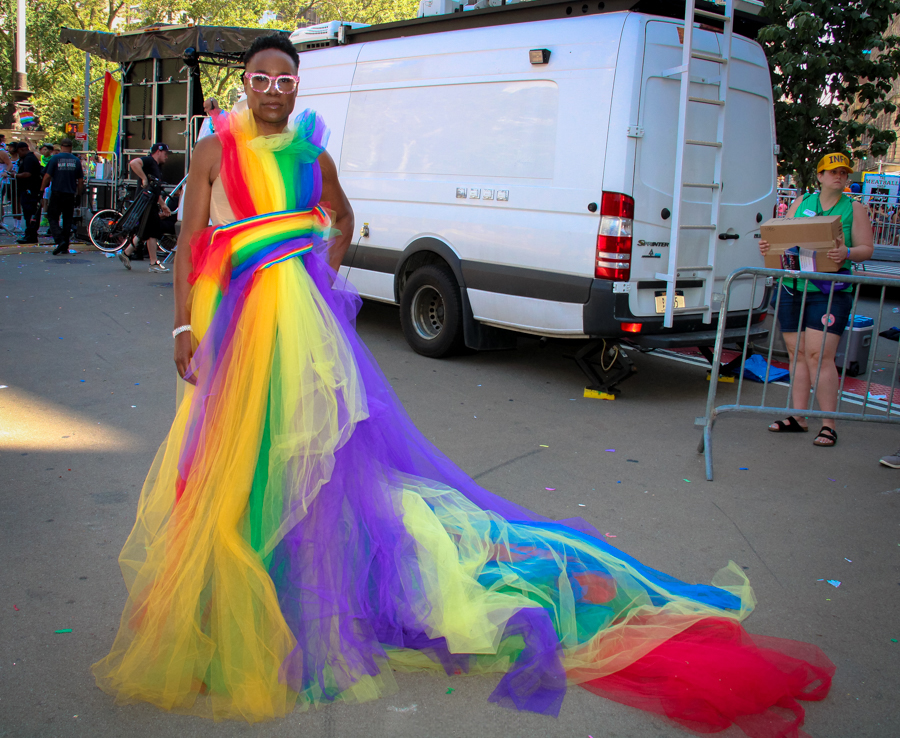
Porter at Stonewall 50 – WorldPride NYC 2019, gown by Siriano

In January 2014, Disney announced that Siriano would be designing costumes for fairy characters in the Disney animated film The Pirate Fairy. Siriano stated that "Disney characters are everlasting and I'm so happy as a young designer to help create a bit of Disney history."

He celebrated the 10th anniversary of his fashion line in February 2018 with a runway show of his Fall 2018 collection. The New York City show featured a diverse set of models, including Ashley Graham, Selma Blair, and Danielle Brooks, and was attended by celebrities Cardi B, Meg Ryan, Laverne Cox, and Whoopi Goldberg.

Siriano has designed multiple custom gowns for actor Billy Porter, including the black tuxedo gown worn by Porter to the 91st Academy Awards in 2019 and the rainbow gown worn by Porter to Stonewall 50 – WorldPride NYC 2019.

In 2020, amidst the COVID-19 pandemic, Siriano and his fashion team volunteered to sew face masks for medical professionals.

== In the media ==
=== Pop culture ===
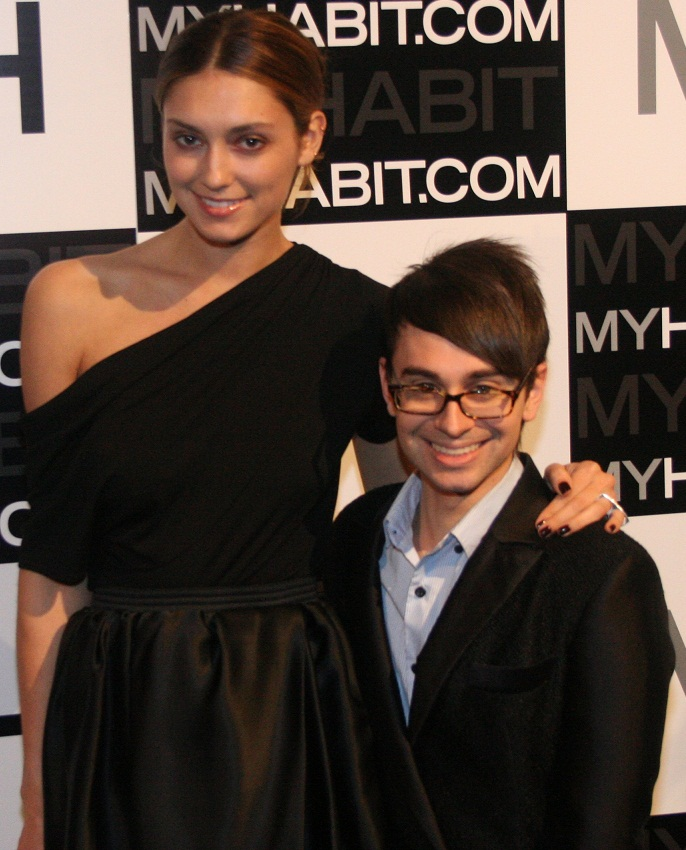
Siriano with Anna Schilling at the My Habit Launch in 2011

Siriano began to receive pop culture attention during his time on Project Runway, primarily for his asymmetrical upswept hairdo and his flamboyant attitude. Several of Siriano's catchphrases were parodied in the media by multiple blogs and television shows like Saturday Night Live, on which Amy Poehler portrayed Siriano. On May 1, 2008, Siriano appeared as himself on season 2 episode 15 of Ugly Betty, and designed some of the cast's costumes (including Amanda Tanen's blouse, which was sold in an auction on the internet). In June 2008, Siriano appeared in the music video for R&B artist Estelle's single "No Substitute Love."

In October 2009, Siriano released a book titled Fierce Style: How To Be Your Most Fabulous Self. The book was co-written by Rennie Dyball and featured a foreword by Siriano's former Runway mentor Tim Gunn.

On April 5, 2010, Bravo aired a one-hour special entitled Christian Siriano: Having a Moment which followed Siriano as he prepared to debut his Spring 2010 collection at Fashion Week.

In August 2010, Siriano's name was used in a Craigslist scam. The scam involved a search for women interested in modeling for Siriano's line. Craigslist took down the fake listings, but another scam asking models for an application fee to work for Siriano soon appeared. Upon hearing the news, Siriano posted a warning on his social media accounts: "fyi girls i have never and do not ever look for models on craigslist or online. these photo shoots i'm hearing about are scams! be careful!"

In September 2011, Siriano's boyfriend Brad Walsh said that he hadn't heard Siriano use his Project Runway catchphrase "fierce" since 2008, and that fashion media were stubbornly refusing to take Siriano seriously because of the way he found fame.

=== Criticism ===
In March 2008, Margaret Price, a columnist for Bitch magazine, wrote an editorial entitled, "Is Christian Siriano Making A Hot Mess of the Term 'Tranny'?", in which she stated that Siriano's use of the terms "tranny" and "hot tranny mess" were offensive to the transgender community and that by using the terms he was popularizing an "as-yet unclaimed slur." In a May 2008 interview with Time Out New York, Siriano responded to a question about the lasting power of drag culture by stating, "If you think of heterosexuals, they have white-trash women and trailer parks, and we have drag queens and trannies. I don't know if I'm the one who can explain it. It's, like, drag queens are just there." The remark garnered criticism for its derogatory slang and its comparison of transsexuality and drag queen culture to "white-trash" and trailer parks. Siriano released an apology to GLAAD in which he stated, "I mean no disrespect to the transgender community and I never will." Of his comments in the article, Siriano said, "I wish that my words were not taken in that way. When I was speaking, some comments that I made were not used in the article." He further commented that he is "actively working to remove" the term "tranny" from his vocabulary.

=== DMA lawsuit ===
In November 2011, Siriano's talent agency, DMA, filed a lawsuit against Siriano, claiming he violated an oral contract and neglected to pay over $53,000 in commission and fees owed to them from his partnership with Payless ShoeSource. Siriano's attorneys released a statement shortly after stating, "It is unfortunate that Designer's Management Agency ("DMA") has commenced a legal proceeding. Christian does not work with DMA and has no obligation to them. DMA concedes that it does not have a written contract. However, based upon an alleged oral contract, it incredibly seeks to obtain commissions in perpetuity. This legal action it has taken against the companies of Christian Siriano is without merit."

== Personal life ==
As of 2008, Siriano lives in the Chelsea neighborhood of Manhattan. He is gay, and became engaged to singer-songwriter Brad Walsh on July 28, 2013. They exchanged engagement bracelets rather than rings. They were married on July 9, 2016, at their summer home in Danbury, Connecticut. On June 25, 2018, Walsh confirmed that he and Siriano had separated the previous month. Later that year, Siriano began a relationship with fellow designer Kyle Smith. Siriano and Walsh began divorce proceedings in April 2021.

Siriano has tattoos of a squid and an octopus on his right arm. He has variously said they are "a tribute to Maryland and the sea life" or that they "mean nothing... Totally random".

== Filmography ==
=== Television ===
Year	Title	Role	Notes
2007–2008	Project Runway	Contestant	Season 4, Winner (14 episodes)
2008	Ugly Betty	Guest Star	Ugly Betty 2 episode 15
2016- 2017	Project Runway: Junior	Judge	Seasons 1 - 2
2019–present	Project Runway	Mentor	Season 17–present

== See also ==
- LGBT culture in New York City
- List of fashion designers
- List of LGBT people from New York City
- NYC Pride March
