= Tim Gunn =

American author, academic, and television personality

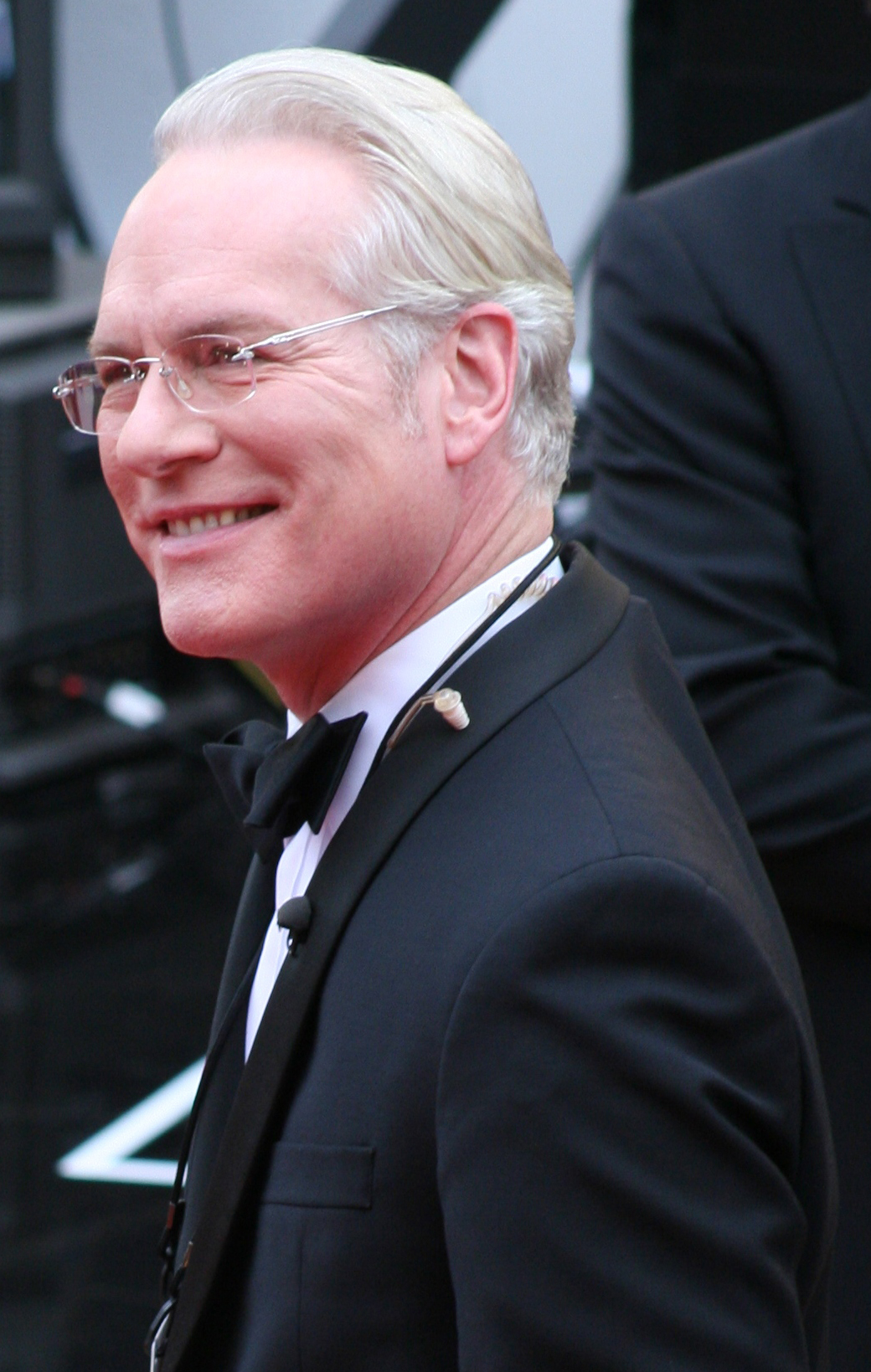
- Gunn attending the 81st Academy Awards, 2009
- Born: Timothy MacKenzie Gunn; July 29, 1953 (age 73); Washington, D.C., U.S.
- Education: Corcoran College of Art and Design (BFA)
- Occupations: Author; Actor; Fashion consultant; Television personality
- Years active: 1982–present

Timothy MacKenzie Gunn (born July 29, 1953) is an American author, academic, and television personality. He served on the faculty of Parsons School of Design in Greenwich Village, New York from 1982 to 2007 and was chair of fashion design at the school from August 2000 to March 2007, after which he joined Liz Claiborne (now Kate Spade & Company) as its chief creative officer. Over 16 seasons, Gunn became well known as the on-air mentor to designers on the reality television program Project Runway. Gunn's popularity on Project Runway led to two spin-off shows: Bravo's Tim Gunn's Guide to Style and Lifetime's Under the Gunn. He has written five books. In addition to being an executive producer, Gunn has been a mentor for teen designers on Project Runway: Junior. He also provides the voice of Baileywick, the castle steward in the Disney Jr. television show Sofia the First, and narrated the sitcom Mixology.

== Early life ==
Gunn was born in Washington, D.C. His father worked in the FBI, where he started as an agent but transitioned into becoming a ghostwriter and speechwriter for J. Edgar Hoover. Gunn attended Corcoran College of Art and Design at George Washington University in Washington D.C. receiving a BFA degree in sculpture.

Gunn, who had identified as gay, was raised in an intensely homophobic household where homosexuals were viewed as predators. According to a video Gunn made for the It Gets Better Project, he attempted suicide at the age of 17 by swallowing over 100 pills. He denied his sexual orientation until his early 20s, and did not share it with his family until he came out to his sister when he was 29.

== Career ==
After serving as director of admissions for Corcoran, Gunn started working at Parsons in 1982, served as associate dean from 1989 to 2000, and then became the Fashion Design Department chair in August 2000. He was credited with "retooling and invigorating the curriculum for the 21st century."

Gunn began appearing on Project Runway during its first season in 2004, and is known for his catchphrase, "Make it work." He received a Primetime Emmy Award in 2013 for Outstanding Host for a Reality Or Reality-Competition Program. Tim Gunn's Guide to Style, a reality show in which Gunn gives fashion advice, debuted in September 2007 on the Bravo television network. The show ran for 16 episodes over two seasons. Beginning in January 2014, he was the host on a 13–episode season of Lifetime's Under the Gunn. He is an executive producer for Project Runway: Junior. He is the teen designers' mentor.

Gunn played a version of himself as a reporter for the fictional Fashion TV in two episodes of ABC's Ugly Betty in February 2007 and later guest starred on Drop Dead Diva in August 2009 as himself. He left Parsons in 2007 joining Liz Claiborne, Inc. as the company's chief creative officer in March of that year.

In April 2007, Abrams Image Publishers released Gunn's book A Guide to Quality, Taste and Style, co-written with Kate Moloney, cover photo by Markus Klinko & Indrani. While on tour in Palm Springs, California, the nearby city of Palm Desert honored Gunn with an official resolution declaring April 27, 2007 (the day of his visit) Timothy M. Gunn Day. He was presented with a certificate by the city of Palm Springs and a plaque by the nearby city of Rancho Mirage in recognition of his career achievements. From 2010 to 2015 he had four additional books published.

In May 2009, Gunn served as the commencement speaker at the Corcoran College of Art and Design, and received an honorary doctorate from the institution. He made sporadic appearances on The Late Late Show with Craig Ferguson's "Dear Aquaman" segments, helping or standing in for Aquaman (Ferguson), answering letters and dispensing advice. Gunn guest starred as Barney's personal tailor on several episodes of How I Met Your Mother. He guest starred as himself on the 6th episode of CW's fourth season of Gossip Girl, "Easy J".

On September 7, 2018, it was confirmed that Gunn, along with Heidi Klum, would not be returning to Project Runway for a 17th season on Bravo, as they had both signed a deal to host a fashion competition show on Amazon Video titled Making the Cut. Making the Cut released its third season in the summer of 2022.

=== In other media ===
In August 2007, Tim Gunn's Podcast (a reality chamber opera) by Jeffrey Lependorf premiered at the Cornelia Street Cafe in Manhattan. It received its first run one year later at the New York International Fringe Festival.

Gunn appeared in a backup story in the first issue of Models Inc., a fashion-themed comic book miniseries published by Marvel Comics which debuted in September 2009 to coincide with New York City's style showcase. He is featured on a variant cover of the issue illustrated by Phil Jimenez. In the series, which is written by Project Runway fan Mark Sumerak and illustrated by Jimenez, Gunn dons Iron Man armor to foil an attack against the New York Fashion Museum.

Gunn appeared in the opening skit on the 62nd Primetime Emmy Awards as a stylist making Jimmy Fallon look like Bruce Springsteen from his Born in the U.S.A. album.

In 2014, he participated in Do I Sound Gay?, a documentary film by David Thorpe about stereotypes of gay men's speech patterns.

Gunn appears in Kate McKinnon's audio drama Heads Will Roll.

== Personal life ==
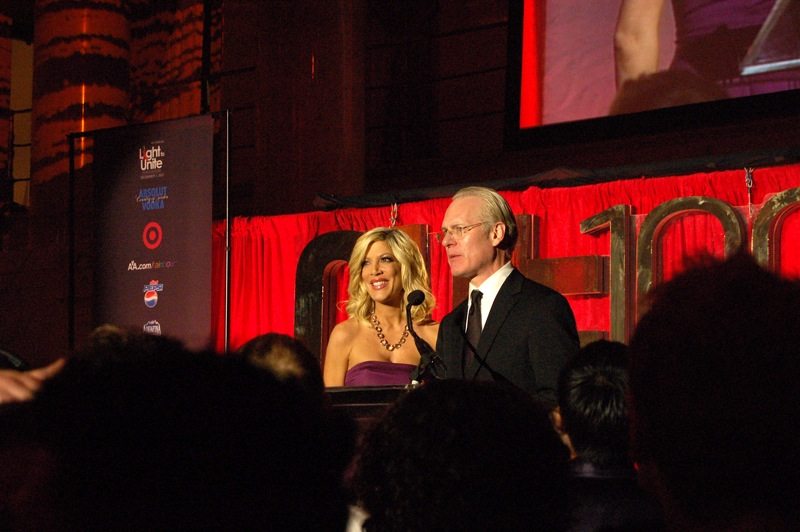
Tori Spelling and Gunn co-presenting at an event in November 2007

Gunn lives in Manhattan. In a 2010 interview with People he said, "For a long time, I didn't know what I was. I knew what I wasn't: I wasn't interested in boys, and I really wasn't interested in girls". He mentioned he has "always been kind of asexual." Gunn spoke about his celibacy in 2012. He later said that he is unashamed of this fact, saying, "Do I feel like less of a person for it? No... I'm a perfectly happy and fulfilled individual". He said he began his self-imposed celibacy as AIDS began ravaging the gay community, and that he and many other people simply retreated. He expanded on this in a 2026 podcast interview with Chelsea Handler, explaining that breaking up with an unfaithful ex-boyfriend in 1982 led to him being tested for HIV "every six months for ten years" and that "whenever [he] was even tempted to engage in something that could become serious with someone", memories of the "self pity [that] turned to ... anger" from the experience "would just take the desire away". He said that it took some adjustment to get used to celibacy and living alone, "but now [he] wouldn’t have it any other way".

Gunn is an outspoken critic of clothing designs using animal fur. In 2008, he narrated a video about rabbit fur farming in China for animal rights group PETA. He said that the treatment of animals used for fur is "egregiously irresponsible". Gunn endorsed Christine Quinn for mayor of New York City in the 2013 mayoral election.

=== Fencing ===
Tim Morehouse, the Olympic medalist in fencing, is the owner of an athletic fencing club in New York City near the home of Tim Gunn, who became a fencer at Morehouse's club at the age of 62. As Gunn has stated, "I love the history of the sport, I love the culture that surrounds it, and I never dreamed I'd become a fanatic. I'm such a fanatic now that I'm committed to competing."

== Awards and honors ==
In June 2020, in honor of the 50th anniversary of the first LGBTQ Pride parade, Queerty named Gunn among the fifty heroes "leading the nation toward equality, acceptance, and dignity for all people".

== Filmography ==
=== Television ===
| Year | Title | Role | Notes |
|---|---|---|---|
| 2004–2017 | Project Runway | Himself (Mentor) | |
| 2007 | Drinks with LX | Himself | |
| 2007 | Ugly Betty | Fashion TV Reporter | 2 episodes |
| 2007–2008 | Tim Gunn's Guide to Style | Himself | |
| 2008 | American Dad! | Himself | Voice, episode: "Escape from Pearl Bailey" |
| 2008 | The Replacements | Himself | Voice, episode: "Heartbreak in the City" |
| 2009 | Drop Dead Diva | Himself | Episode: "Second Chances" |
| 2009 | Project Runway: All Star Challenge | Himself | Television special |
| 2009–2016 | The Biggest Loser | Himself | |
| 2010–2014 | How I Met Your Mother | Himself | 5 episodes |
| 2010 | Gossip Girl | Himself | Episode: "Easy J" |
| 2011 | Teen Spirit | Supervisor J-3 | Television film |
| 2012 | The Revolution | Himself (co-host) | |
| 2012 | The Cleveland Show | Himself | Voice, 2 episodes |
| 2012–2018 | Sofia the First | Baileywick | Voice, 42 episodes |
| 2013 | Sesame Street | Bill Ding | Episode: "Best House of the Year" |
| 2013 | Family Guy | Himself | Voice, episode: "Save the Clam" |
| 2014 | Under the Gunn | Himself (host) | |
| 2014 | Hollywood Game Night | Himself (panelist) | Episode: "What's Cooking on Game Night" |
| 2015 | Inside Amy Schumer | Willenby | Episode: "Foam" |
| 2016 | The Real O'Neals | Himself | Episode: "The Real Other Woman" |
| 2017 | Bill Nye Saves the World | Himself | Episode: "Designer Babies" |
| 2017–2019 | Mickey and the Roadster Racers | Robbie Roberts | Voice, 4 episodes |
| 2017 | BoJack Horseman | Himself | Voice, episode: "Hooray! Todd Episode!" |
| 2019 | Middle School Moguls | Wren | Voice, 2 episodes |
| 2020–2022 | Making the Cut | Himself (host) | Also executive producer |
| 2020 | Scooby-Doo and Guess Who? | Himself | Voice, episode: "A Fashion Nightmare!" |
| 2021 | Animaniacs | Pageant Host | Voice, episode: "Mouse Congeniality" |
| 2023 | Bob's Burgers | Sewing Machine | Voice, episode: "Gift Card or Buy Trying" |
| 2026 | Sofia the First: Royal Magic | Baileywick | Voice, recurring role |

=== Film ===
| Year | Title | Role | Notes |
|---|---|---|---|
| 2010 | Sex and the City 2 | Himself | |
| 2011 | The Smurfs | Henri | |

== Published works ==
- Gunn, Tim; Moloney, Kate (2007), Tim Gunn: A Guide to Quality, Taste & Style, Harry N. Abrams, Inc., ISBN 978-0-8109-9284-9
- Gunn, Tim; Calhoun, Ada (September 2010), Gunn's Golden Rules: Life's Little Lessons for Making It Work, Gallery Books, ISBN 978-1-4391-7656-6
- Gunn, Tim (May 2011), Shaken, Not Stirred, Tim Gunn, ASIN B004UN4L9E
- Gunn, Tim; Calhoun, Ada (September 2012), Tim Gunn's Fashion Bible: The Fascinating History of Everything in Your Closet, Gallery Books, ISBN 978-1-4516-4387-9
- Gunn, Tim (March 2015), Tim Gunn: The Natty Professor: A Master Class on Mentoring, Motivating, and Making It Work!, Gallery Books, ISBN 978-1476780061

== See also ==
- LGBT culture in New York City
- List of LGBT people from New York City
