= Gronkowski =

Gronkowski (Polish pronunciation: [grɔnˈkɔfskʲi]; feminine: Gronkowska, plural: Gronkowscy) is a surname of Polish language origin. It may refer to:

== People ==
- A family of American sportspeople:
  - Ignatius Gronkowski (1897–1981), cyclist and great-grandfather of the following, all brothers and NFL American football players:
  - Dan Gronkowski (born 1985), former tight end
  - Chris Gronkowski (born 1986), former fullback
  - Rob Gronkowski (born 1989), former tight end and the best-known member of the family
  - Glenn Gronkowski (born 1993), former fullback
- Bruno Gröning (1906–1959), German mystic, born Bruno Grönkowski
- Henning Gronkowski /de/ (born 1988), German actor
- Joanna Rawik primo voto Gronkowska /pl/ (born 1934), Polish singer and actrees
- Stanisław Gronkowski (1922–2004), Polish actor

== Other ==
- Gronkowski (horse) (born 2015), thoroughbred racehorse

== See also ==
- Gronków
