= Gronkowsbees =

- Family Guy episode
- Episode no.: Season 15; Episode 11
- Directed by: Jerry Langford
- Written by: Cherry Chevapravatdumrong
- Production code: EACX08
- Original air date: January 15, 2017

Guest appearances
- Rob Gronkowski as himself; Gordon Gronkowski as himself; Chris Gronkowski as himself; Dan Gronkowski as himself; Glenn Gronkowski as himself; Mae Whitman as Y2K Crown; Nicole Sullivan as Stewie's Customer/Y2K Crowd; Lucas Grabeel as Eighth Grader; Wally Wingert as Y2K Crown

Episode chronology
← Previous "Passenger Fatty-Seven"	Next → "Peter's Def Jam"
- Family Guy season 15

"Gronkowsbees" is the eleventh episode of the fifteenth season of the animated sitcom Family Guy, and the 280th episode overall. It aired on Fox in the United States on January 15, 2017, and was written by Cherry Chevapravatdumrong and directed by Jerry Langford. In this episode, New England Patriots player Rob Gronkowski (guest starring as himself) moves into the Griffins' neighborhood and instantly befriends Peter, Quagmire, Cleveland and Joe, inviting them to parties every day. In the episode subplot, Brian and Stewie take up beekeeping.

== Plot ==
Inspired by Quagmire's mention of having to undergo flight training for drones, Peter buys one. But in a flight around the neighborhood, it is captured by a hawk and taken to the house behind the Griffin family's home. In the attempt to see if the neighbor could help them recover it, they find he has died. The home is quickly purchased by New England Patriots tight end Rob Gronkowski. At first, the guys are amazed, but his non-stop partying soon gets on Peter's nerves, but when he tries to get them to quiet down, he is abused for his trouble. He tries to enlist the guys to help him, but their stunt of dressing Cleveland as a leprechaun fails and they are all collectively beaten up.

Meanwhile, when forced to play "tea party" with Stewie, Brian finds he has taken up beekeeping and suggests marketing the honey at a farmers' market with him. They quickly sell out of their original production at a major profit, so to encourage the bees to make more honey, Stewie feeds them steroids. While the bees do increase their output, the boys find they have also become stronger and more aggressive, chasing them out of the market and following them home.

After using Meg to temporarily distract the bees, Stewie launches the hive over the back fence to get rid of the queen. The hive lands on Gronk, who samples the honey but becomes very frightened by the handful of stray bees and departs Quahog. Later on the news, the Griffins find that Gronk was suspended from the Patriots after steroids from the ingested honey caused him to fail a drug test. However, Gronk pitches a bus through the roof of the Griffin home in revenge.

== Reception ==
The episode received an audience of 3.55 million viewers, a decrease from the previous episode, and making it the third-most watched show of the night, behind The Mick and The Simpsons.
