= Family Guy season 15 =

Season of television series

Family Guy
- Season 15
- DVD cover
- Showrunners: Steve Callaghan; Richard Appel
- Starring: Seth MacFarlane; Alex Borstein; Seth Green; Mila Kunis; Mike Henry
- No. of episodes: 20

Release
- Original network: Fox
- Original release: September 25, 2016 – May 21, 2017

Season chronology
- ← Previous; Season 14 Next → Season 16

The fifteenth season of Family Guy aired on Fox in the United States from September 25, 2016, to May 21, 2017.

The series follows the dysfunctional Griffin family, consisting of father Peter, mother Lois, daughter Meg, son Chris, baby Stewie and the family dog Brian, who reside in their hometown of Quahog. The executive producers for the fifteenth production season are Seth MacFarlane, Richard Appel, Steve Callaghan, Danny Smith and Kara Vallow. The showrunners are Appel and Callaghan.

Guest stars for the season include Kyle Chandler, Stephen Curry, Flea, Rob Gronkowski, Sean Penn, Frank Sinatra Jr., David Tennant, and Jacob Tremblay.

During this season, Chris dates singer Taylor Swift while Peter becomes an Uber driver ("Chris Has Got a Date, Date, Date, Date, Date"), Quagmire gets hooked on Tinder ("The Dating Game"), and also becomes a gigolo during an airline pilot strike ("American Gigg-olo"). Other episode plots include Brian and Stewie writing songs for kids ("The Boys in the Band"), Chris becoming a star baseball player ("Bookie of the Year"), Rob Gronkowski moving in next to Peter with his party bus ("Gronkowsbees"), a homage to three novels commonly taught in (and, in some cases, banned from) American high school English classes ("High School English"), Peter and Lois joining the anti-vaccination movement ("Hot Shots"), Peter meeting the children he never knew he had ("A House Full of Peters"), Chris falling for a Mexican teen mom ("Dearly Deported"), and a fictionalized behind-the-scenes look of the show ("Inside Family Guy").

The season premiere includes a cameo by Vinny (voiced by Tony Sirico), the dog who temporarily replaced Brian in season 12. The season concluded with a one hour broadcast of two episodes.

== Voice cast and characters ==
- Seth MacFarlane as Peter Griffin, Brian Griffin, Stewie Griffin, Glenn Quagmire, Tom Tucker, Carter Pewterschmidt, Dr. Hartman
- Alex Borstein as Lois Griffin, Tricia Takanawa, Barbara "Babs" Pewterschmidt
- Seth Green as Chris Griffin
- Mila Kunis as Meg Griffin
- Mike Henry as Cleveland Brown

=== Supporting cast ===
- Johnny Brennan as Mort Goldman
- Gary Cole as Principal Shepard
- Carrie Fisher as Angela
- Sanaa Lathan as Donna Tubbs-Brown
- Jennifer Tilly as Bonnie Swanson
- Patrick Warburton as Joe Swanson
- Adam West as Mayor Adam West

== Episodes ==
No. overall	No. in season	Title	Directed by	Written by	Original release date	Prod. code	U.S. viewers (millions)
270	1	"The Boys in the Band"	Joseph Lee	Chris Regan	September 25, 2016	EACX01	2.80
After being tired of how pandering children's music is, Stewie and Brian start their own band, singing children's songs with an adult edge, but Stewie's old flame and acting school partner, Olivia, shows up and tries to sabotage him. Meanwhile, Chris gets a job as Quagmire's personal assistant for his sex life. Note: This episode was dedicated to the memory of Douglas M. Lackey, one of the music editors of the show.
271	2	"Bookie of the Year"	Jerry Langford	Daniel Peck	October 2, 2016	DACX10	3.47
When Chris starts showing signs of aggression, Peter and Lois end up discovering that he is a talented baseball pitcher. Peter and the guys immediately start betting on the games, as other betters bet big against Chris after seeing him and then lose huge wagers, but Peter is put into an impossible position when the only way to salvage his title game bets is to have Chris lose on purpose. Meanwhile, Brian and Stewie reunite with Frank Sinatra Jr. to open an Italian restaurant, but the restaurant ends up losing money when Frank begins to give everyone free meals. Note: This was Frank Sinatra Jr.'s final appearance on the show; although the episode aired in October, it was recorded prior to his death in March.
272	3	"American Gigg-olo"	Mike Kim	Chris Sheridan	October 16, 2016	DACX19	3.68
When the local airline pilots go on strike, Quagmire is forced to look for a new job and gets one as a gigolo. But when his clients refuse to pay him, Peter is forced to help him out, and their friendship quickly turns into a prostitute/pimp partnership. Meanwhile, Brian gets a job at a hardware store when Peter takes him off his health insurance, and Stewie goes from trying to get him fired to having to perform impromptu surgery to save Brian's life.
273	4	"Inside Family Guy"	Joe Vaux	Andrew Goldberg	October 23, 2016	DACX20	2.49
James Woods hosts a special episode that takes a look behind the scenes of Family Guy. Meanwhile, Peter is replaced and pitches his own television series to Fox. The story is a reference to sitcom 8 Simple Rules, where David Spade also joined the cast after the family's father had left the show.
274	5	"Chris Has Got a Date, Date, Date, Date, Date"	Brian Iles	Artie Johann	November 6, 2016	EACX02	2.60
Pop singer Taylor Swift agrees to be Chris' date at his homecoming dance, and even though he is kind and charming, she sabotages the relationship to use as inspiration for another song about being mistreated by men, which Chris comes to accept. Meanwhile, Peter becomes an Uber driver.
275	6	"Hot Shots"	John Holmquist	David A. Goodman	November 13, 2016	EACX03	3.58
Peter and Lois get involved in the anti-vaccination movement to save Stewie from autism, causing a measles epidemic to break out in Quahog.
276	7	"High School English"	Steve Robertson	Ted Jessup	November 20, 2016	EACX04	2.74
While Peter is hiding out in a library to escape the police for crashing into a house, he reads three novels that are commonly taught (and sometimes banned) in American high schools: The Great Gatsby, Adventures of Huckleberry Finn, and Of Mice and Men.
277	8	"Carter and Tricia"	Mike Kim	Patrick Meighan	December 4, 2016	EACX05	3.45
Peter tells Tricia Takanawa about Carter's plan to use poisonous cost-cutting chemicals in Pawtucket Patriot when Carter purchases the brewery. Meanwhile, Brian's driver's license expires, and he gets help from Stewie to renew it.
278	9	"How the Griffin Stole Christmas"	Julius Wu	Aaron Lee	December 11, 2016	EACX06	3.05
When Peter becomes a mall Santa, and he becomes drunk when he learns that he can get away with anything, but the real Santa is upset about this and takes direct action to stop Peter. Meanwhile, Stewie and Brian crash Christmas parties for free food and women.
279	10	"Passenger Fatty-Seven"	Greg Colton	Alex Carter	January 8, 2017	EACX07	4.00
When Quagmire receives free tickets to San Francisco, Peter, Cleveland and Joe tag along. Soon after, the guys get into a serious situation when Quagmire's plane gets hijacked by a group of European terrorists, which puts Quagmire's flying skills to the test. Note: This episode was dedicated to Carrie Fisher.
280	11	"Gronkowsbees"	Jerry Langford	Cherry Chevapravatdumrong	January 15, 2017	EACX08	3.55
Peter and the guys discover former tight end Rob Gronkowski from the New England Patriots is moving into the house by the Griffins, but they soon get annoyed with his lifestyle and partying. Meanwhile, Brian discovers that Stewie is a beekeeper and suggests he sell his honey publicly, but things go south when the bees go on steroids and plan to get revenge on the duo.
281	12	"Peter's Def Jam"	Joe Vaux	Anthony Blasucci	February 12, 2017	EACX09	1.86
Peter becomes a DJ after he and the guys attempt to start their own podcast, leading to discord and (in Peter's case) deafness. Meanwhile, Brian is forced to move into Stewie's room after Lois gets an allergy.
282	13	"The Finer Strings"	Joseph Lee	Shawn Ries	February 19, 2017	EACX10	2.26
Peter and the guys form a string quartet and everyone makes the cut except for Peter, who is kicked out. Meanwhile, Brian becomes Carter's seeing eye dog.
283	14	"The Dating Game"	Brian Iles	Tom Devanney	March 5, 2017	EACX11	2.48
When Quagmire discovers Tinder, Peter, Cleveland and Joe must save him from his app addiction. Meanwhile, Stewie is diagnosed with scoliosis and (briefly) enjoys the benefits of being disabled.
284	15	"Cop and a Half-wit"	John Holmquist	Ray James	March 12, 2017	EACX12	2.51
Peter helps Joe solve cases, but he gets annoyed when Joe takes all the credit for himself. Meanwhile, Brian and Chris look after Stewie after he gets a concussion while playing football.
285	16	"Saturated Fat Guy"	Steve Robertson	Damien Fahey	March 19, 2017	EACX13	2.34
Peter opens up his own food truck to go against Lois's healthy-eating plans and to make some extra cash, but the junk food has negative effects on Peter's health and makes him morbidly obese afterwards. Meanwhile, Meg joins a roller derby team despite Chris's warnings that it's too dangerous, which leads to Meg getting injured in the process.
286	17	"Peter's Lost Youth"	Julius Wu	Danny Smith	March 26, 2017	EACX14	2.17
Peter gets jealous when Lois upstages him at a Boston Red Sox fantasy baseball camp. Meanwhile, Stewie runs away from home when Meg puts him in a timeout.
287	18	"The Peter Principal"	Greg Colton	Steve Callaghan	April 30, 2017	EACX16	2.42
When Peter temporarily becomes the high school principal, Meg sees his power as an opportunity to get back at her bullies. Meanwhile, Brian and Stewie open up a bed and breakfast and have to deal with a lot of prostitutes.
288	19	"Dearly Deported"	Jerry Langford	Mike Desilets	May 21, 2017	EACX17	2.14
When Chris's Mexican girlfriend, Isabella, is deported back to Mexico, he steps up to take care of her twin babies. He eventually enlists his parents and Quagmire to head into Mexico and bring her back to the U.S.
289	20	"A House Full of Peters"	Joseph Lee	Chris Sheridan	May 21, 2017	EACX19	2.14
After Lois discovers that Peter was a sperm donor in his youth, Peter's past comes back to him when many of his children unexpectedly come to his house – one of whom wants to usurp his place as Lois's husband.
