= The Boys in the Band (Family Guy) =

- Family Guy episode
- Episode no.: Season 15; Episode 1
- Directed by: Joseph Lee
- Written by: Chris Regan
- Production code: EACX01
- Original air date: September 25, 2016

Guest appearances
- Nicole Byer as Airport Security Worker; Jon Daly as Police Officer; Jenna Lamia as Mrs. Wong; Nolan North as The Turtlenecks; Rachael MacFarlane as Olivia Fuller; Emily Osment as Ashley's Granddaughter; Amy Schumer as Factory Crew Leader; Tony Sirico as Vinny Fuller; Ursula Taherian as Loan Applicant; Uncredited: Phil LaMarr as Drake (deleted scenes)

Episode chronology
← Previous "Road to India"	Next → "Bookie of the Year"
- Family Guy season 15

"The Boys in the Band" is the first episode of the fifteenth season of the animated sitcom Family Guy, and the 270th episode overall. It aired on Fox in the United States on September 25, 2016, and is written by Chris Regan and directed by Joseph Lee. In the episode, Stewie and Brian form a children's band, which later disbands after an old flame of Stewie's gets in the way. Meanwhile, Chris goes to work for Quagmire.

This episode has a guest appearance of Tony Sirico as Vinny, and its premiere broadcast was dedicated to the memory of Family Guy music editor Douglas M. Lacky.

== Plot ==
Brian and Stewie watch an extended director's cut of Willy Wonka & the Chocolate Factory. Lois enters stating that the movie is not appropriate and changes the channel to a baby-appropriate show starring Turtlenecks (a parody of The Wiggles). Stewie feels as though that the baby songs in the show are lacking in quality. Challenged by Brian, Stewie decides to write songs for babies that address actual baby related issues. Stewie and Brian form a band they call 'Red Shirt, Blue Shirt', and he books a gig at a children's party. While there, they meet Olivia Fuller, who somehow managed to survive the playhouse fire in "Chick Cancer". After the song, they are given a positive reception, which Olivia mysteriously surveys. Just as the duo is about to celebrate, Olivia comes up and states that she and Stewie are going on a date, much to Brian's disappointment. Olivia becomes president of Brian and Stewie's fan club, making Brian uncomfortable, but Stewie is laid-back about it. Stewie and Brian perform at a number of gigs. At Cheesie Charlie's, after Brian leaves for a minute, Olivia says in confidence to Stewie that at the end of every gig, everybody gives Brian the attention and not Stewie, and Stewie impulsively believes this.

Meanwhile, Chris asks his parents for money for a shamrock tattoo, but his parents tell him to get a job. Chris has a difficult time searching for employment, but when he and Peter help Lois unload groceries, they notice Quagmire sending away a potential sex partner. Quagmire tells Peter that he is unable to manage his personal life. Peter offers Chris as his personal assistant, and both Chris and Quagmire eventually agree after initial hesitation. After showing Chris the ropes, Quagmire sees that Chris makes an excellent assistant, following another stand with another one of his sexual clients.

While rehearsing, Stewie asks that Brian's microphone be cut off, irking the dog, and the duo have a spat that ends with Stewie walking off. Afterwards, Olivia approaches Brian and tells him that they should kick Stewie out of the band. Brian is at first hesitant, but Olivia states that Stewie is contemplating on firing Brian, provoking Brian to fire Stewie, and Olivia takes his place in the band.

When Lois finds out about Chris' job upon finding Quagmire's sex toys in the dishwasher, she calls Quagmire's house, only to receive a voice message made by Chris. They approach Chris, who is walking a horse gimp (which is actually Mort Goldman in a horse costume), and Lois tells him to quit. Chris refuses stating that he's getting paid for the job, prompting Lois to nonchalantly say that she has $1,100 in a paint can in the garage, and will give it to Chris if he agrees to quit. Chris does so, as she plans not to speak of Chris' job again.

Doing another gig while opening for the Turtlenecks, Brian sees Stewie in the crowd and tells Olivia that he cannot do this anymore since Stewie is responsible for instigating the band. However, Olivia coldly shows no pity, prompting Brian to quit. Brian finds Stewie and apologizes for his actions. The duo reconcile and Brian reveals that Olivia got a new dog to join the band. They assume it is one they never met. That dog turns out to be Vinny as he and Olivia perform at their latest gig.

== Reception ==
The episode had an audience of 2.80 million viewers, the lowest in its timeslot, but the second most-watched episode on Fox that night, behind The Simpsons.

The episode was met with positive reviews. Jesse Schedeen of IGN gave the episode an 8.1/10, stating "Family Guy's 15th season started off on solid footing thanks to a consistently entertaining premiere."
