= Passenger Fatty-Seven =

- Family Guy episode
- Episode no.: Season 15; Episode 10
- Directed by: Greg Colton
- Written by: Alex Carter
- Production code: EACX07
- Original air date: January 8, 2017

Guest appearance
- Stephen Curry as himself

Episode chronology
← Previous "How the Griffin Stole Christmas"	Next → "Gronkowsbees"
- Family Guy season 15

"Passenger Fatty-Seven" is the tenth episode of the fifteenth season of the animated sitcom Family Guy, and the 279th episode overall. It aired on Fox in the United States on January 8, 2017, and is written by Alex Carter and directed by Greg Colton. The story follows Quagmire flying his friends to San Francisco, and as they go home, they are soon ambushed by a group of Eastern European terrorists hijacking their plane, causing Quagmire to put his ex-Navy piloting skills to the test.

This episode was dedicated in memory of cast member Carrie Fisher, who died on December 27, 2016, after going into cardiac arrest while on a flight to Los Angeles on December 23, 2016. A slide showing her picture with the words "In Loving Memory" on top and "Carrie Fisher 1956–2016" below was shown before the start of the episode.

== Plot ==
At the Drunken Clam, Glenn Quagmire meets with Peter Griffin, Cleveland Brown and Joe Swanson and tells them that he can get a discount for friends and family and bring them along on a trip, so they plan on going to San Francisco. They steal a cab meant for Lois who was originally going to a timeshare hosted by Donna Tubbs' sister Janet with Donna and Bonnie Swanson. As Peter unknowingly grabbed Lois's suitcase, Lois finds a sex doll resembling her in the suitcase as Lois commented that Peter was "bringing her" in the suitcase. When they arrive in San Francisco, tour the city as well as ride Segways and getting 'lesbian' haircuts and Peter meets Stephen Curry and sits on his lap.

When the trip ends, Quagmire gives them a tour of the plane, where they soon accuse Quagmire of goofing off while the plane was on autopilot which he claims to use while taking breaks. Quagmire takes offense to that and kicks them out of the cockpit. While flying, the plane gets hijacked by 3 terrorists from an unidentified Eastern European country who jam the frequency. The terrorists explain that they are going to punish America for supporting the other side of the unidentified Eastern European country in the civil war (implied it is Ukraine and the civil war is likely the War in Donbass). This hijacking is covered on the news by Tom Tucker and is watched by the Griffins, the Swansons, the Browns and Ida Quagmire.

Quagmire refuses to allow the terrorists entry to the cockpit for the safety of all passengers, even when Peter is threatened at gunpoint. Quagmire attempts to notify air traffic control but the signals were jammed. Joe and Cleveland decide to take matters into their own hands by going down to the cargo hold and retrieve a gun from Joe's checked luggage. One of the terrorists discovers this and heads down to the basement with Peter as a human shield. Joe opens the landing gear, but Peter and the terrorist fall and fight on the landing gear. Just as the two are about to make peace while flying over Yosemite National Park, Cleveland manages to hit the terrorist off as he falls to a river below. Joe attempts to shoot the remaining terrorists but his ammunition is in his carry on so Cleveland scalds them with hot coffee.

When the trio go back up and knock out the remaining terrorists, they are hailed as heroes. When Quagmire comes out to congratulate them and informs everyone that the plane will land in Nevada, another terrorist who was a reserve member, and posing as a blue collared businessman hijacks the plane where he plans to crash it into Las Vegas' biggest hotel with Rita Rudner in it. Before the plot is carried out, Quagmire turns on the seatbelt sign and does a barrel roll to subdue the terrorist. Unfortunately, Quagmire gets angry at the passengers for not following the "Please Fasten Seatbelt" light that was turned on ("Oh come on. Doesn't anyone pay attention to the sign?"). However, F/A-18 Hornet fighter jets appear unaware that the hijackers have been taken care of. The plane is shot in its right wing, but a determined Quagmire manages to land the plane in Lake Mead and keep everyone safe.

As the passengers and co-pilot are tended by the EMTs and the damaged plane taken care of by the firefighters and the three remaining terrorists are also arrested by the FBI (with the police in tow and the media covering the averted crisis as well), Peter, Cleveland, and Joe thank Quagmire for saving them and apologize for judging his flight actions. Just then, a military jet comes with the guys' respective families to reunite with them. Peter and Chris have a chat about some of the charges Chris found on Peter's card from their time in San Francisco and suggests he keep some of his purchases private. As the various families plan to head back to Quahog and put the recent event behind them, Peter breaks the fourth wall and tells the audience "Oh, yeah, in case we didn't say, this was Spirit Airlines."

== Reception ==
The episode received an audience of 4.00 million viewers, an increase from the previous episode, and making it the third most-watched show of the night, behind Son of Zorn and The Simpsons.
