= Ignatius Gronkowski =

American cyclist (1897–1981)

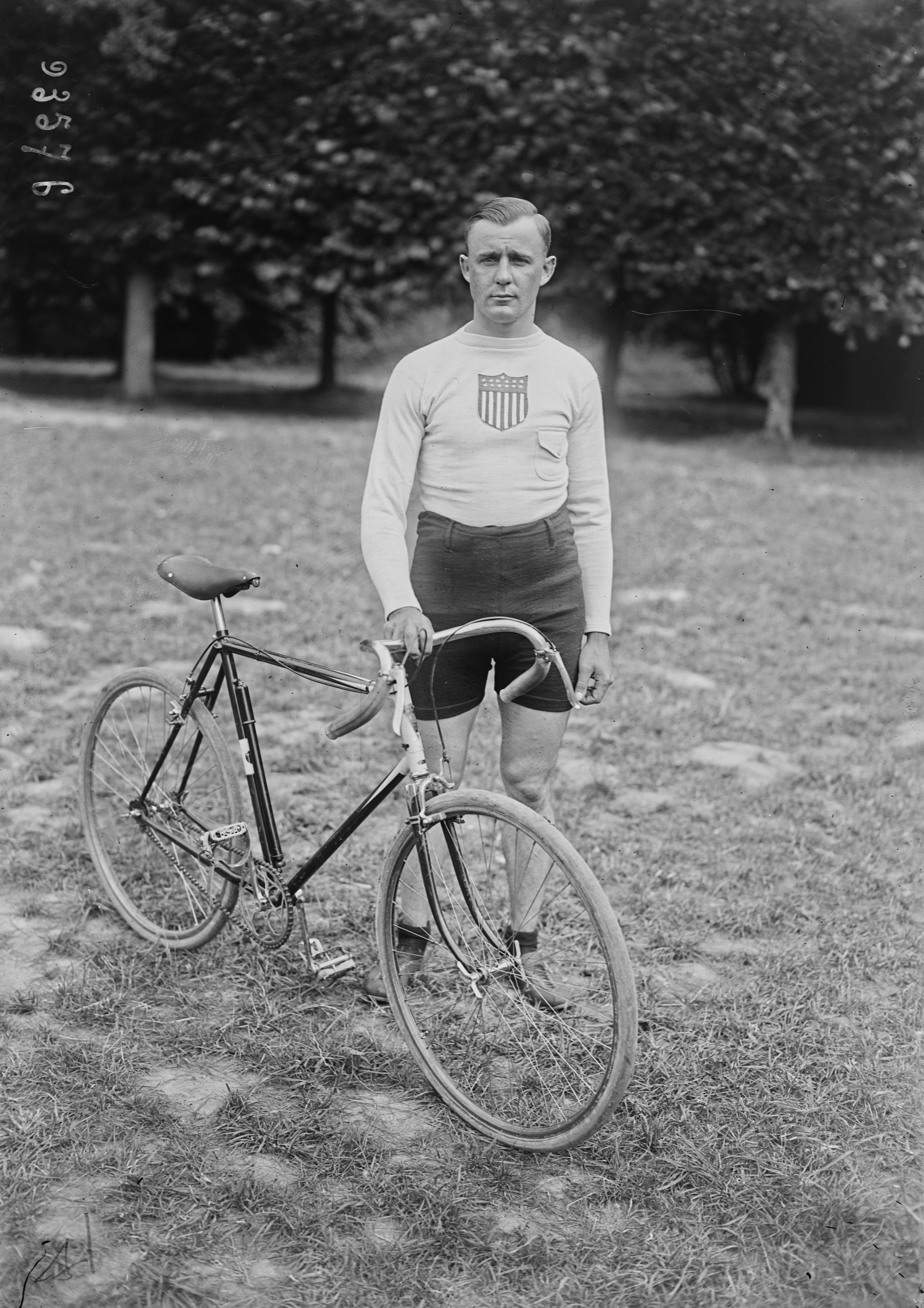
- Ignatius Gronkowski in 1924

Personal information
- Nickname: Iggy
- Born: March 28, 1897 Buffalo, New York, U.S.
- Died: September 22, 1981 (aged 84) Buffalo, New York, U.S.

Cycling career
- Sport: Cycling

Ignatius J. Gronkowski (March 28, 1897 – September 22, 1981) was an American professional cyclist. He held five world records for the 1/2-, 3/4-, 1.5-, and 2-mile distances.

Gronkowski was born and raised in Buffalo, New York. He attended school at St. Stanislaus.

He represented the United States at the 1924 Summer Olympics in Paris. Gronkowski was reluctant to travel to Paris and leave his wife and baby with the little money that he had saved. However, that June, his coworkers at the American Radiator Company plant presented him with $582.70 (equivalent to $10,946.84 in 2025), enabling him to make the trip. The American team performed worse than expected at the Olympics at least in part because they had to use French bicycles to which they were not accustomed.

Gronkowski did not participate in the 1928 Summer Olympics because there was no qualifying event held in the United States.

After his racing career ended, he promoted the sport while working as a taxi driver.

His great-grandsons include National Football League players Rob, Dan, Chris and Glenn Gronkowski.
