= Glenn Gronkowski =

American football player (born 1993)

No. 47, 48
- Position: Fullback

Personal information
- Born: March 25, 1993 (age 33); Buffalo, New York, U.S.
- Listed height: 6 ft 2 in (1.88 m)
- Listed weight: 234 lb (106 kg)

Career information
- High school: Williamsville North (Williamsville, New York)
- College: Kansas State (2012–2015)
- NFL draft: 2016: undrafted

Career history
- Buffalo Bills (2016); New England Patriots (2016–2017)*
- * Offseason or practice squad member only

Awards and highlights
- Super Bowl champion (LI); First-team All-Big 12 (2014); Second-team All-Big 12 (2015)
- Stats at Pro Football Reference

Glenn Thomas Gronkowski (born March 25, 1993) is an American former professional football player who was a fullback in the National Football League (NFL). He played college football for the Kansas State Wildcats. After going undrafted in the 2016 NFL draft, Gronkowski was signed by the Buffalo Bills, and was in the practice squad of the New England Patriots from 2016 until he was released in 2017.

== Early life ==
Gronkowski attended Williamsville North High School. While there, as a senior, he recorded 53 receptions for 762 yards and 11 touchdowns on offense.

On defense, he recorded 43 tackles, eight interceptions, two returned for touchdowns and two recovered fumbles. He also averaged 35.8 yards per punt and handled kickoffs. He was named the Section VI Class AA North Co-Offensive Player of the Year.

During his high school career, Gronkowski recorded 125 receptions for 2,076 yards and 23 touchdowns.

== College career ==
After high school, Gronkowski attended Kansas State, where he majored in marketing.

As a true freshman in 2012, he decided to redshirt. As a redshirt freshman in 2013, he appeared in all 13 games, starting five. He recorded five receptions for 194 yards and three touchdowns. He was also a lead blocker for running back John Hubert, who finished fourth in the Big 12 in rushing yards and recorded the 14th 1,000-yard season in school history. For the season, Gronkowski was named an All-Big 12 honorable mention selection and was a First-team Academic All-Big 12 selection as well.

In 2014, he appeared in all 13 games with three starts. He recorded five receptions for 99 yards and one touchdown. He was named First-team Academic All-District 7 and First-team Academic All-Big 12. For 2015, he started all 13 games. He recorded five receptions for 76 yards and one touchdown. He also rushed the ball 11 times for 45 yards and one touchdown. He also threw a four-yard touchdown pass for fellow fullback Winston Dimel, the first Wildcat non-quarterback to throw a touchdown pass since 2010 (Daniel Thomas). He was named Second-team All-Big 12 by the Associated Press and First-team Academic All-Big 12 and First-team Academic All-District 7.

== Professional career ==
Pre-draft measurables
Height	Weight	Arm length	Hand span	Wingspan	40-yard dash	10-yard split	20-yard split	20-yard shuttle	Three-cone drill	Vertical jump	Broad jump	Bench press
6 ft 2 1/8 in (1.88 m)	239 lb (108 kg)	30 3/4 in (0.78 m)	9 1/2 in (0.24 m)	6 ft 2 in (1.88 m)	4.71 s	1.59 s	2.70 s	4.45 s	7.10 s	33.0 in (0.84 m)	10 ft 0 in (3.05 m)	17 reps
All values from NFL Combine

=== Buffalo Bills ===
After going undrafted in the 2016 NFL draft, Gronkowski signed with the Buffalo Bills as an undrafted free agent. He was released on September 12, 2016, after only playing in one game.

=== New England Patriots ===
On October 1, 2016, Gronkowski was signed to the New England Patriots' practice squad. He was released by the Patriots on October 12. On October 17, Gronkowski was re-signed to the team's practice squad. Gronkowski was again released from New England's practice squad on November 7. He was re-signed again on November 16. Gronkowski was released again on November 30, but was re-signed once more on December 2. On February 5, 2017, the Patriots won Super Bowl LI. In the game, the Patriots defeated the Atlanta Falcons by a score of 34–28 in overtime to give Gronkowski his first Super Bowl championship.

On February 14, 2017, the Patriots signed Gronkowski to a reserve/futures contract. He was waived by New England as a part of final roster cuts on September 2.

== Personal life ==
Gronkowski is a native of Williamsville, New York. He is the youngest of five brothers, four of which played in the NFL: Dan, Rob, and Chris. Gronkowski is the great-grandson of Ignatius Gronkowski, who represented the United States in cycling at the 1924 Summer Olympics in Paris, and who held five world records in that sport.

Gronkowski and his four brothers co-own Gronk Fitness, a fitness gear and lifestyle brand that partners with industry leaders like Life Fitness and Xtreme Monkey to outfit commercial and home gyms with fitness equipment.

As of 2023, he resides in Northlake, Texas near the Dallas Fort Worth Metroplex. He married Regan Reeves on April 19, 2025 in Aubrey, Texas.
