= Chris Gronkowski =

American football player (born 1986)

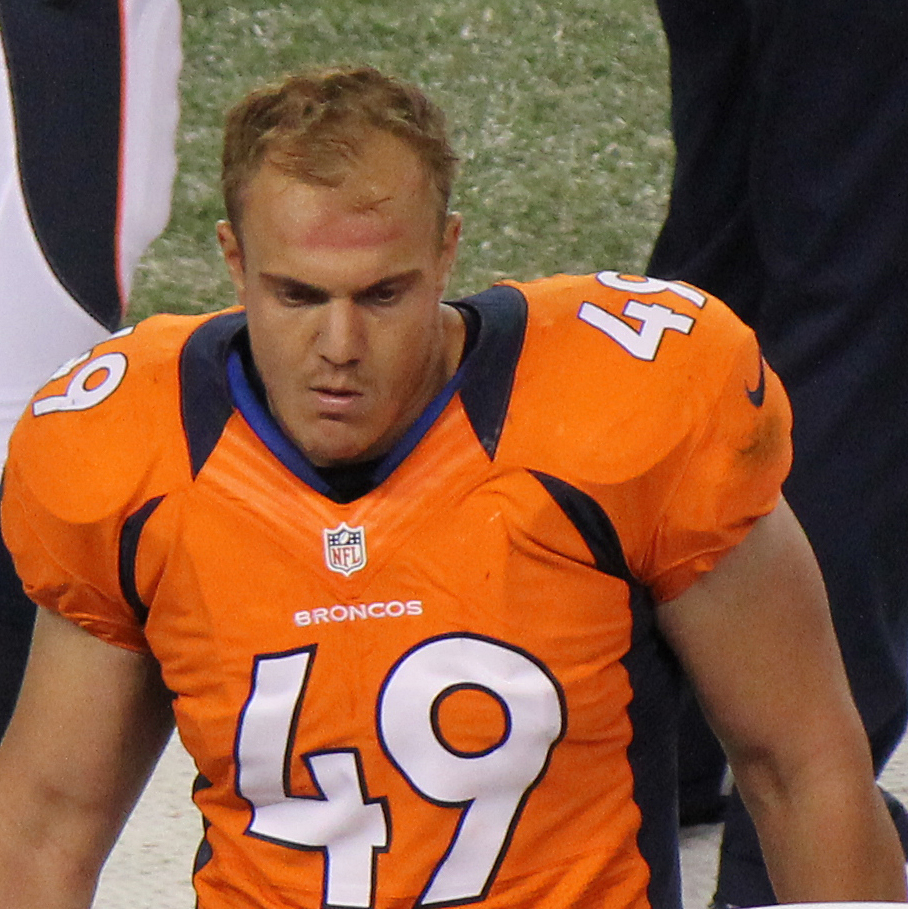
- Gronkowski with the Denver Broncos in 2012

No. 44, 49
- Position: Fullback

Personal information
- Born: December 26, 1986 (age 39); Buffalo, New York, U.S.
- Listed height: 6 ft 2 in (1.88 m)
- Listed weight: 245 lb (111 kg)

Career information
- High school: Williamsville North (Williamsville, New York)
- College: Arizona
- NFL draft: 2010: undrafted

Career history
- Dallas Cowboys (2010); Indianapolis Colts (2011); Denver Broncos (2012); San Diego Chargers (2013)*
- * Offseason or practice squad member only

Awards and highlights
- Pro Football Focus All-Rookie Team (2010)

Career NFL statistics
- Rushing yards: 17
- Rushing average: 3.4
- Receptions: 8
- Receiving yards: 46
- Receiving touchdowns: 1
- Stats at Pro Football Reference

Christopher Michael Gronkowski (born December 26, 1986) is an American former professional football player who was a fullback in the National Football League (NFL). After playing college football for the Arizona Wildcats, he was signed by the Dallas Cowboys in 2010, Indianapolis Colts in 2011.

== Early life ==
Gronkowski was born on December 26, 1986, in Buffalo, New York to Diane Walters and Gordon Gronkowski, who played three years as an offensive guard at Syracuse. His great-grandfather, Ignatius, was a member of the 1924 U.S. Olympic cycling team in Paris. His brothers Dan, Rob and Glenn also played in the NFL.

== College football ==
Gronkowski accepted a football scholarship from the University of Maryland, with the intention of playing fullback. He was redshirted in 2005.

In January 2007, he transferred to the University of Arizona. As a sophomore, he played linebacker for the Wildcats but did not record any stat.

As a fourth year junior in 2008, he started 7 games, while making 8 receptions for 198 yards, 3 touchdowns and a team leading 24.8-yard per reception average. He served primarily as a backfield blocking specialist from the H-back position. He was named second-team Academic All-Pac-10.

As a fifth year senior in 2009, he started 7 out of 13 games, tallying 4 catches for 20 yards and 2 carries for one yard. He was named honorable-mention Academic All-Pac-10.

He finished his college career after starting 15 out of 26 games, collecting 12 receptions for 218 yards (18.2-yard avg.), 2 carries for one yard and 3 receiving touchdowns.

== Professional career ==
Pre-draft measurables
Height	Weight	40-yard dash	10-yard split	20-yard split	20-yard shuttle	Three-cone drill	Vertical jump	Broad jump	Bench press
6 ft 2 in (1.88 m)	238 lb (108 kg)	4.71 s	1.64 s	2.73 s	4.37 s	7.16 s	34.5 in (0.88 m)	10 ft 3 in (3.12 m)	24 reps
All values from 2010 Arizona Pro Day

=== Dallas Cowboys ===
Gronkowski did not attend the NFL Scouting Combine, though his brother Rob did. He declared for the 2010 NFL draft and was projected as high as the 4th round, but went undrafted. On April 25, he signed with the Dallas Cowboys. On September 4, he made the 53 man roster for insurance purposes in case fullback Deon Anderson's injuries persisted. He made his first career start on September 19, against the Chicago Bears. His first career touchdown catch came in the same game on a one-yard pass from Tony Romo. He became the full-time starter at fullback after Anderson was released on September 24.

On October 25, in a Monday Night Football game against the New York Giants, Gronkowski missed a blitz pickup on linebacker Michael Boley, as he ran straight to quarterback Tony Romo and hit him high. Romo got the pass off to Miles Austin, but he suffered a fractured left clavicle, which ended his season. Gronkowski was active for 14 of the 16 games and started 7 times as a rookie. He was inconsistent as a lead blocker, while posting 5 carries for 17 yards, 7 receptions for 35 yards and one touchdown. He was waived on September 3, 2011.

=== Indianapolis Colts ===
On September 4, 2011, Gronkowski was claimed off waivers by the Indianapolis Colts. On October 25, he was placed on the injured reserve with a pectoral injury.

=== Denver Broncos ===
On May 23, 2012, Gronkowski was traded to the Denver Broncos in exchange for cornerback Cassius Vaughn. He appeared in 14 games as a backup, making one reception for 11 yards and had no rushing attempts. He was not re-signed after the season.

=== San Diego Chargers ===
On April 23, 2013, Gronkowski signed with the San Diego Chargers as a free agent. On August 27, he was placed on the injured reserve list with an ankle injury. On August 31, he was waived with an injury settlement.

== Personal life ==
In July 2015, Gronkowski married Brittany Bieber. They have four children.

After being waived by the San Diego Chargers he founded Ice Shaker, a company that makes kitchen-grade stainless steel insulated bottles in 2017. Gronkowski pitched the business, with the help of his brothers, on an episode of Shark Tank. He made a deal with Mark Cuban and guest shark Alex Rodriguez for $150,000 in exchange for 15% equity. In 2018, Gronkowski stated that his company had over $3 million in sales that he attributes to the product being featured on Shark Tank.

Gronkowski is active in the family's fitness company Gronk Fitness, promoting fitness equipment sales and workout routines.
