= Rob Gronkowski =

American football player (born 1989)

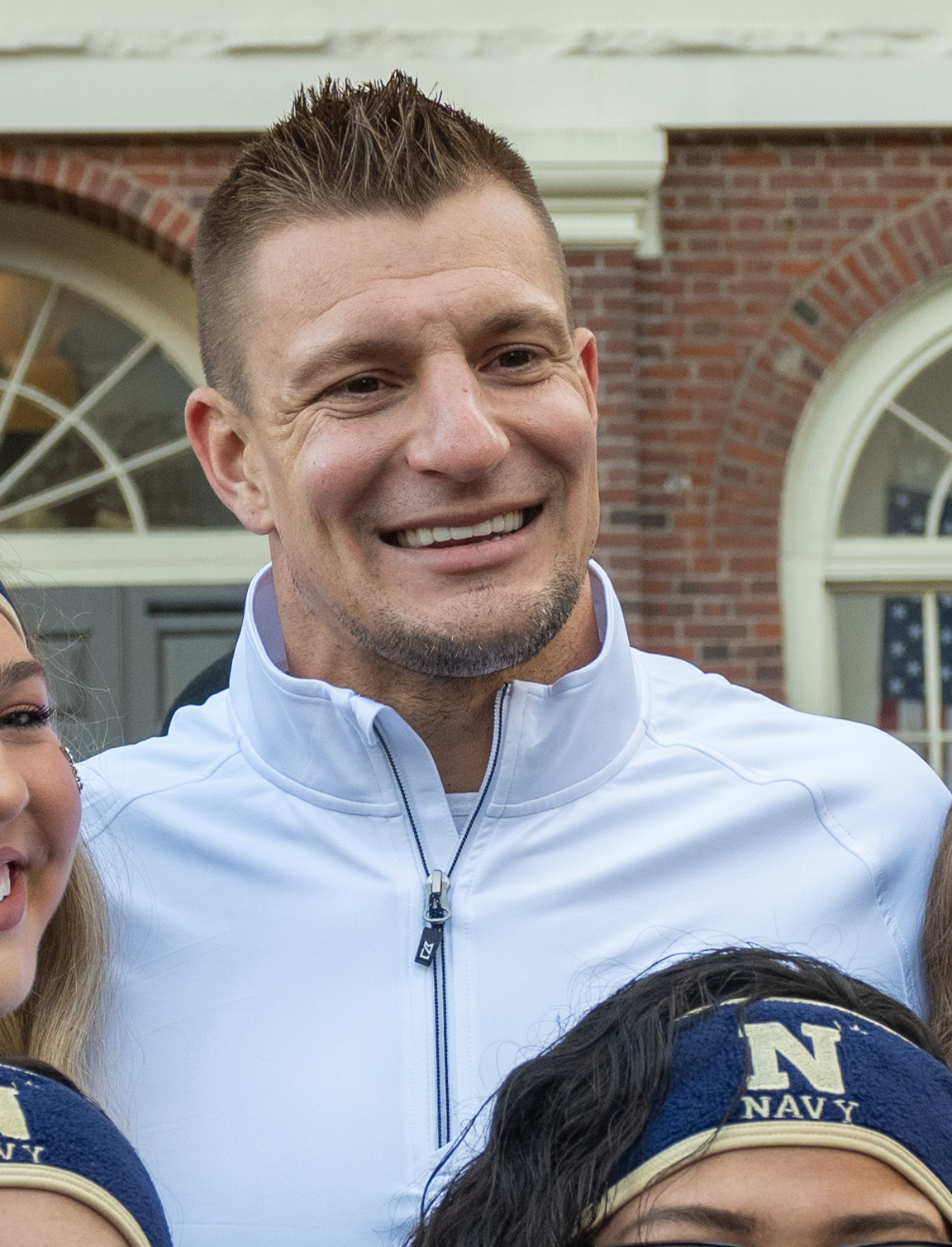
- Gronkowski in 2023

No. 87
- Position: Tight end

Personal information
- Born: May 14, 1989 (age 37); Amherst, New York, U.S.
- Listed height: 6 ft 6 in (1.98 m)
- Listed weight: 265 lb (120 kg)

Career information
- High school: Woodland Hills (Churchill, Pennsylvania)
- College: Arizona (2007–2009)
- NFL draft: 2010: 2nd round, 42nd overall pick

Career history
- New England Patriots (2010–2018); Tampa Bay Buccaneers (2020–2021)

Awards and highlights
- 4× Super Bowl champion (XLIX, LI, LIII, LV); NFL Comeback Player of the Year (2014); 4× First-team All-Pro (2011, 2014, 2015, 2017); 5× Pro Bowl (2011, 2012, 2014, 2015, 2017); NFL receiving touchdowns leader (2011); NFL 2010s All-Decade Team; NFL 100th Anniversary All-Time Team; PFWA All-Rookie Team (2010); New England Patriots Hall of Fame; New England Patriots All-2010s Team; New England Patriots All-Dynasty Team; Third-team All-American (2008); First-team All-Pac-10 (2008); NFL records: Most total touchdowns in a season by a tight end: 18; Most receiving touchdowns in a season by a tight end: 17

Career NFL statistics
- Receptions: 621
- Receiving yards: 9,286
- Receiving touchdowns: 92
- Stats at Pro Football Reference

Robert James Gronkowski (born May 14, 1989) is an American former professional football tight end who played in the National Football League (NFL) for 11 seasons. Nicknamed "Gronk", Gronkowski played nine seasons for the New England Patriots, then played his final two seasons for the Tampa Bay Buccaneers. Regarded as the greatest tight end of all time, he is a four-time Super Bowl champion (XLIX, LI, LIII, LV), a five-time Pro Bowl selection, a four-time first-team All-Pro selection, and was selected to the NFL 2010s All-Decade Team and NFL 100th Anniversary All-Time Team.

Gronkowski played college football for the Arizona Wildcats, earning third-team All-American honors as a sophomore in 2008. Despite playing only two collegiate seasons, his 18.8 yards per reception average and 1,197 receiving yards were team records for his position. The Patriots selected Gronkowski in the second round of the 2010 NFL draft, after he missed his junior year due to back surgery, immediately becoming a major contributor to the franchise's dynasty.

A complete tight end, he was considered elite as both a receiver and a blocker. He set several NFL records, including being the first player of his position to lead the league in receiving touchdowns (17 in 2011). Gronkowski also has the most combined receptions (23) and receiving yards (297) by a tight end in Super Bowl history. He is ranked first in average yards per target (9.9) and average touchdowns per game (0.69) among tight ends. Gronkowski also holds the Patriots franchise record of total receiving touchdowns (79).

== Early life ==
Gronkowski was born in Amherst, New York, on May 14, 1989, and was raised in nearby Williamsville. He is the second youngest son of Gordon Gronkowski and Diane Walters. His father was a college football guard for Syracuse University from 1977 to 1981 and later founded a high-end fitness equipment business. He is a great-grandson of Ignatius Gronkowski, who represented the United States in cycling at the 1924 Summer Olympics in Paris, France, and held five world records in the sport. Gronkowski's parents divorced in 2008. His four brothers – Gordie, Dan, Chris, and Glenn – all played collegiate sports, and later played professionally.

Gronkowski played hockey until he was 14; he then started playing basketball. He attended Williamsville North High School (WNHS) for his first three years of high school, playing tight end and defensive end, as well as freshman kickoff specialist, supposedly due to his having the biggest feet on the team; center in basketball; and first baseman in baseball for the WNHS Spartans. As a junior playing football, he recorded 36 receptions for 648 yards and seven touchdowns on offense, and 73 tackles and six sacks on defense. He was named an All-Western New York first-team and All-State second-team player.

In 2006, Gronkowski moved to suburban Pittsburgh, where he attended Woodland Hills High School for his senior year. Initially ruled ineligible by the Western Pennsylvania Interscholastic Athletic League because of his transfer, he recorded eight receptions for 152 yards and four touchdowns at Woodland Hills after the ruling of ineligibility was overturned. He was named a SuperPrep All-American, PrepStar All-American, Associated Press Class 4-A all-state, Pittsburgh Post-Gazette "Fabulous 22", Pittsburgh Post-Gazette first-team all-conference, The Patriot-News (Harrisburg, Pennsylvania) "Platinum 33", and a Pittsburgh Tribune-Review "Terrific 25" player. He was recruited by Kentucky, Arizona, Clemson, Louisville, Maryland, Ohio State, and Syracuse. Gronkowski graduated from Woodland Hills in 2007 with a 3.75 GPA and 1560 out of 2400 SAT score.

== College career ==
After graduating from high school, Gronkowski attended the University of Arizona as a Pre-Business major and played for the Arizona Wildcats football team from 2007 to 2009 under head coach Mike Stoops. As a freshman in 2007, he recorded 28 receptions for 525 yards and six touchdowns. His 18.8 yards per reception average was the best on the team and his receiving yards were a school record for a tight end. He was named The Sporting News freshman All-American, Rivals.com freshman All-American, The Sporting News freshman Pac-10, and All-Pac-10 honorable mention player.

Gronkowski missed the first three games of the 2008 season, but later recorded 47 receptions for 672 yards and a team-best ten touchdowns. Five of his touchdowns were scored in his first two games against UCLA and Washington. He was twice named the John Mackey National Tight End of the Week, including his performance in a failed comeback bid against Oregon, when he caught 12 passes for 143 yards. He set the school records for a tight end for single-game, single-season, and career receptions, yards, and touchdowns. Gronkowski was named an Associated Press third-team All-American and All-Pac-10 first-team tight end.

Prior to the 2009 season, Gronkowski was placed on the watchlist for the Lombardi Award. He missed his junior season in 2009 due to back surgery, which caused his draft stock to fall.

== Professional career ==
Pre-draft measurables
Height	Weight	Arm length	Hand span	40-yard dash	10-yard split	20-yard split	20-yard shuttle	Three-cone drill	Vertical jump	Broad jump	Bench press	Wonderlic
6 ft 6 1/4 in (1.99 m)	264 lb (120 kg)	34 1/4 in (0.87 m)	10 3/4 in (0.27 m)	4.68 s	1.58 s	2.68 s	4.47 s	7.18 s	33.5 in (0.85 m)	9 ft 11 in (3.02 m)	23 reps	32
All values from Arizona Pro Day, except measurements and BP (from the NFL Combine). Did not participate in most combine events due to a back injury.

=== New England Patriots ===
==== 2010 season ====
"So Rob Gronkowski, certainly an interesting player. Excellent size, very well thought of down there by Coach [Mike] Stoops and his staff. I think as we saw there, in New York, he's kind of a fun loving guy who enjoys having a good time, but he plays like that, too. He plays with a good attitude. He's aggressive."
–Coach Bill Belichick, April 2010

Gronkowski was drafted by the New England Patriots in the second round with the 42nd overall pick in the 2010 NFL draft, after a draft day trade with the Oakland Raiders; in pre-draft evaluations revealed in May 2016, Raiders scouts had rated Gronkowski as the "best all-around player in the draft". He became the highest drafted tight end out of Arizona, breaking the mark set by Brandon Manumaleuna in 2001. He signed a four-year contract on July 25, 2010. The deal was worth $4.4 million, with a $1.76 million signing bonus.

External videos
- 2010 NFL Draft: Rob Gronkowski
- 2010 NFL Draft Vignette: Rob Gronkowski

During the preseason, Gronkowski was one of three NFL players to score four touchdowns, tying Victor Cruz, a rookie wide receiver for the New York Giants, and Anthony Dixon, a running back for the San Francisco 49ers. In the Week 1 game against the Cincinnati Bengals, Gronkowski caught his first regular season touchdown in the fourth quarter on a one-yard pass from Tom Brady in the 38–24 victory.

In a Week 10 victory over the Pittsburgh Steelers, Gronkowski caught three touchdown passes from Brady, becoming the first rookie in Patriots history, and the youngest rookie in NFL history to accomplish this feat. In honor of the feat, Madden NFL 12 has a "Rob Gronkowski Award" for players who have a tight end catch three or more touchdowns in a single game.

Visiting his hometown of Buffalo in Week 16, Gronkowski caught two touchdowns against the Buffalo Bills. He recorded his first 100-yard receiving game with six receptions for 102 receiving yards and a receiving touchdown in the regular season finale against the Miami Dolphins to give him 10 on the season. In 16 games played, Gronkowski started 11 games and caught 42 passes for 546 yards. Despite missing his entire 2009 college season following back surgery, Gronkowski did not miss a single game or practice all season; he was the first rookie tight end since the NFL-AFL merger to score 10 touchdowns. The Patriots finished with 14–2 record and won the AFC East. In the playoffs, Gronkowski made his postseason debut against the New York Jets in the Divisional Round. In the 28–21 upset loss, he had four receptions for 65 receiving yards.

Gronkowski was nominated three times for Pepsi NFL Rookie of the Week, in Weeks 10, 14, and 17, winning twice and losing in Week 10 to Tim Tebow. Gronkowski also finished fifth in fan balloting at tight end for the 2011 Pro Bowl, and fourth overall among rookies. Gronkowski received one writer's vote for the Associated Press 2010 All-Pro Team (writers only vote for one tight end). He was named to the NFL All-Rookie Team.

==== 2011 season ====
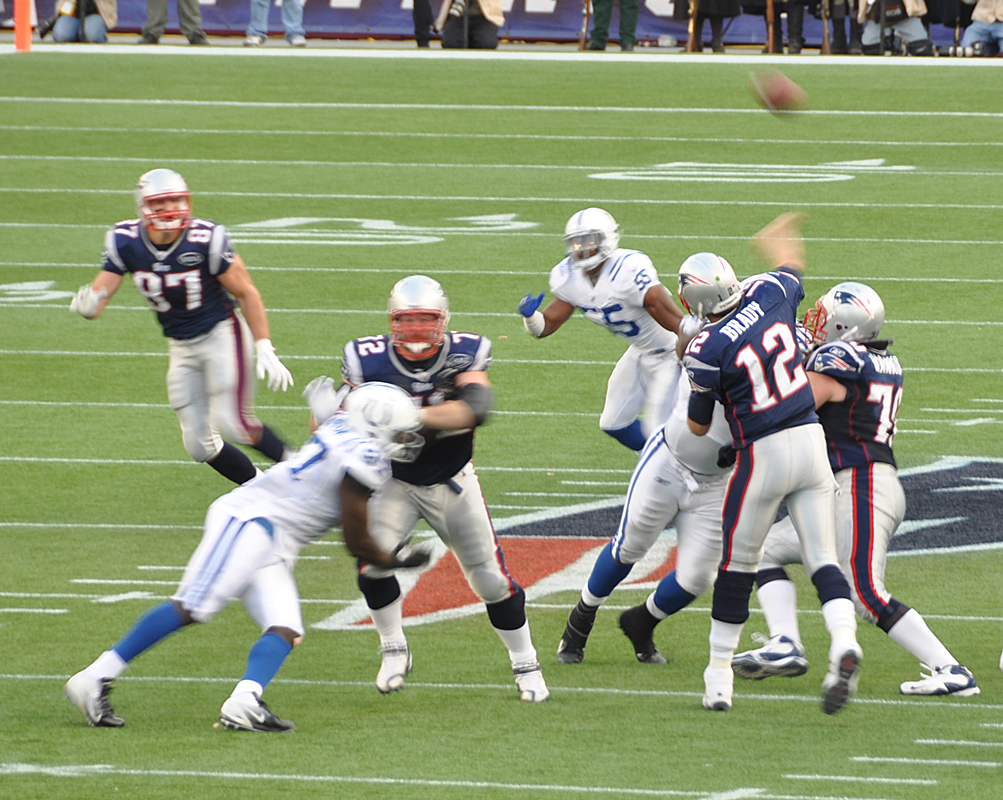
Gronkowski (#87) in a 2011 game against the Indianapolis Colts

Gronkowski caught his first touchdown of the 2011 season on a 10-yard pass from Tom Brady in the Patriots' Week 1 38–24 victory over the Miami Dolphins; Gronkowski's six catches accounted for 86 of Brady's franchise record 517 yards. In Week 2, against the San Diego Chargers, he had four receptions for 86 receiving yards and two receiving touchdowns in the 35–21 victory. He followed that up with seven receptions for 109 receiving yards and two receiving touchdowns in the 34–31 loss to the Buffalo Bills. Over the next four games, he totaled 19 receptions for 214 receiving yards in a 3–1 stretch for the Patriots. In Week 9, against the New York Giants, he had eight receptions for 101 receiving yards and one receiving touchdown in the 24–20 loss. In Week 10, against the New York Jets, he had eight receptions for 113 receiving yards and two receiving touchdowns in the 37–16 victory. In Week 11, against the Kansas City Chiefs, Gronkowski caught two touchdown passes, including a career-long 52-yard catch and run, to equal his 2010 touchdown total in just ten games. He passed his reception and yardage totals from 2010 in only eight games.

Through Week 11, Gronkowski led all tight ends with 10 touchdowns; his 20 touchdowns were the most ever for a tight end in his first two seasons. His reception and receiving yardage totals both ranked second among tight ends (after Jimmy Graham of the New Orleans Saints), and in the top ten among all receivers, though they only ranked second on the Patriots, behind wide receiver Wes Welker.

Gronkowski broke the NFL record for touchdowns scored in a single season by a tight end when he had the second three-touchdown game of his career in the Patriots' Week 13 victory against the Indianapolis Colts. After scoring two touchdowns on receptions from Tom Brady, Gronkowski scored a third touchdown from two yards out. Initially declared a forward pass, the pass was later ruled a lateral pass, which is recorded as a rushing attempt; as of the conclusion of the 2020 season, it was the only rushing attempt of Gronkowski's career, and his only rushing touchdown. It was the first rushing touchdown by a tight end since Bo Scaife did it in 2006, and the first in Patriots history. At game's end, Gronkowski had sole possession of the touchdown scoring record, with 14, and shared the record for receiving touchdowns, 13, with Antonio Gates and Vernon Davis.

Gronkowski took sole possession of the tight end receiving record a week later against the Washington Redskins, in which he caught his 14th and 15th touchdown passes of the season; in total, he had six receptions for a career-high 160 yards. His performance also earned him his first AFC Offensive Player of the Week award, and, for the second week in a row, NFL.com's "Hardest Working Man" award. He ended the season with 1,327 receiving yards, breaking the previous NFL record for a tight end of 1,310 set by Jimmy Graham of the Saints earlier that same day. He also finished with 18 total touchdowns, 17 receiving—both NFL records for tight ends. Gronkowski's 18 touchdowns were the second-highest total in the NFL (after Philadelphia's LeSean McCoy, who had 20), and equaled the output of the entire St. Louis Rams team. His 17 receiving touchdowns were the most of any NFL player in 2011, marking the first time in NFL history a tight end had sole possession of the league lead.

Gronkowski was voted the starting tight end for the AFC at the 2012 Pro Bowl. One of eight Patriots players voted to the Pro Bowl, he finished fan voting with 936,886 votes, more than triple the number received by the number two tight end, Gronkowski's teammate Aaron Hernandez, and the third-highest total of any AFC player, behind teammates Tom Brady and Wes Welker. He was also voted the tight end for the AP All-Pro first team, receiving 44½ of the 50 votes (44 voters voted for Gronkowski; 5 voters voted for Jimmy Graham, and one voter split a vote between the two). He was ranked 21st by his fellow players on the NFL Top 100 Players of 2012.

==== 2011 postseason ====
In the Patriots' first playoff game, a 45–10 rout of the Denver Broncos in the Divisional Round, Gronkowski tied an NFL post-season record, catching three touchdown passes as part of a 10-catch, 145-yard effort. Gronkowski alone had more catches than the entire Broncos offense, as quarterback Tim Tebow completed just 9 of 26 passes. In the AFC Championship, a 23–20 win over the Baltimore Ravens, Gronkowski suffered a high ankle sprain on a tackle by Ravens safety Bernard Pollard; the status of his ankle was one of the major story lines in the run-up to Super Bowl XLVI. Gronkowski still managed to finish with five receptions for 87 yards. In Super Bowl XLVI, the Patriots decided to start Gronkowski, but he wasn't a large factor in the game. With only a few seconds left in the Super Bowl, Gronkowski had a chance on Tom Brady's Hail Mary as time expired, but his dive for the ball came up short. Gronkowski finished the game with two receptions for 26 yards, which was his lowest output since early October. The Patriots lost the Super Bowl to the New York Giants, 21–17. A few days after the Super Bowl, Gronkowski had an MRI of his injured ankle that revealed strained ligaments and required surgery to repair.

==== 2012 season ====
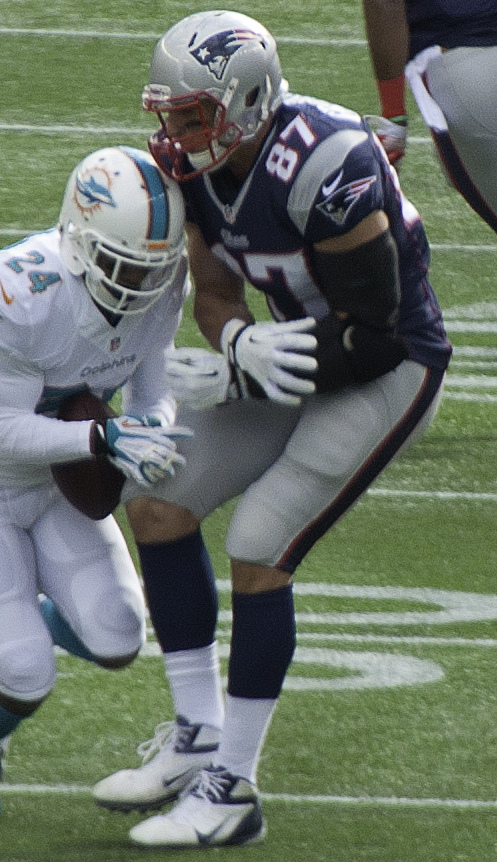
Gronkowski during the 2013 season

On June 8, 2012, Gronkowski signed a six-year, $54 million contract extension, the largest ever for an NFL tight end. The contract included an $8 million signing bonus, but otherwise left the 2012 and 2013 seasons of his rookie contract intact. Gronkowski started the season with receiving touchdowns in consecutive games, a 34–13 victory over the Tennessee Titans and a 20–18 loss to the Arizona Cardinals. In Week 4, he had five receptions for 104 receiving yards and one receiving touchdown in a 52–28 victory over the Buffalo Bills. In Week 7, against the New York Jets, he had six receptions for 78 receiving yards and two receiving touchdowns in the 29–26 victory. In Week 8, against the St. Louis Rams, he had eight receptions for 146 receiving yards and two receiving touchdowns in the 45–7 victory.

In the Patriots' 59–24 victory in Week 11 over the Indianapolis Colts, Gronkowski had seven receptions for 137 receiving yards and two receiving touchdowns. Gronkowski broke his left forearm late in the fourth quarter during an extra point He became the third tight end in NFL history (after Tony Gonzalez and Antonio Gates) to achieve three seasons with at least 10 touchdown receptions, and the first ever to do it in three consecutive seasons. Gronkowski returned to practice in Week 15, and participated in the Week 17 game against the Miami Dolphins, scoring a touchdown. He re-injured his left arm in the first quarter of the Patriots' first playoff game, against the Houston Texans. He required another operation, and missed the remainder of the playoffs. In 11 games in the 2012 season, Gronkowski had 790 receiving yards and 11 touchdowns. He earned a Pro Bowl nomination despite missing some playing time. He was ranked 25th by his fellow players on the NFL Top 100 Players of 2013.

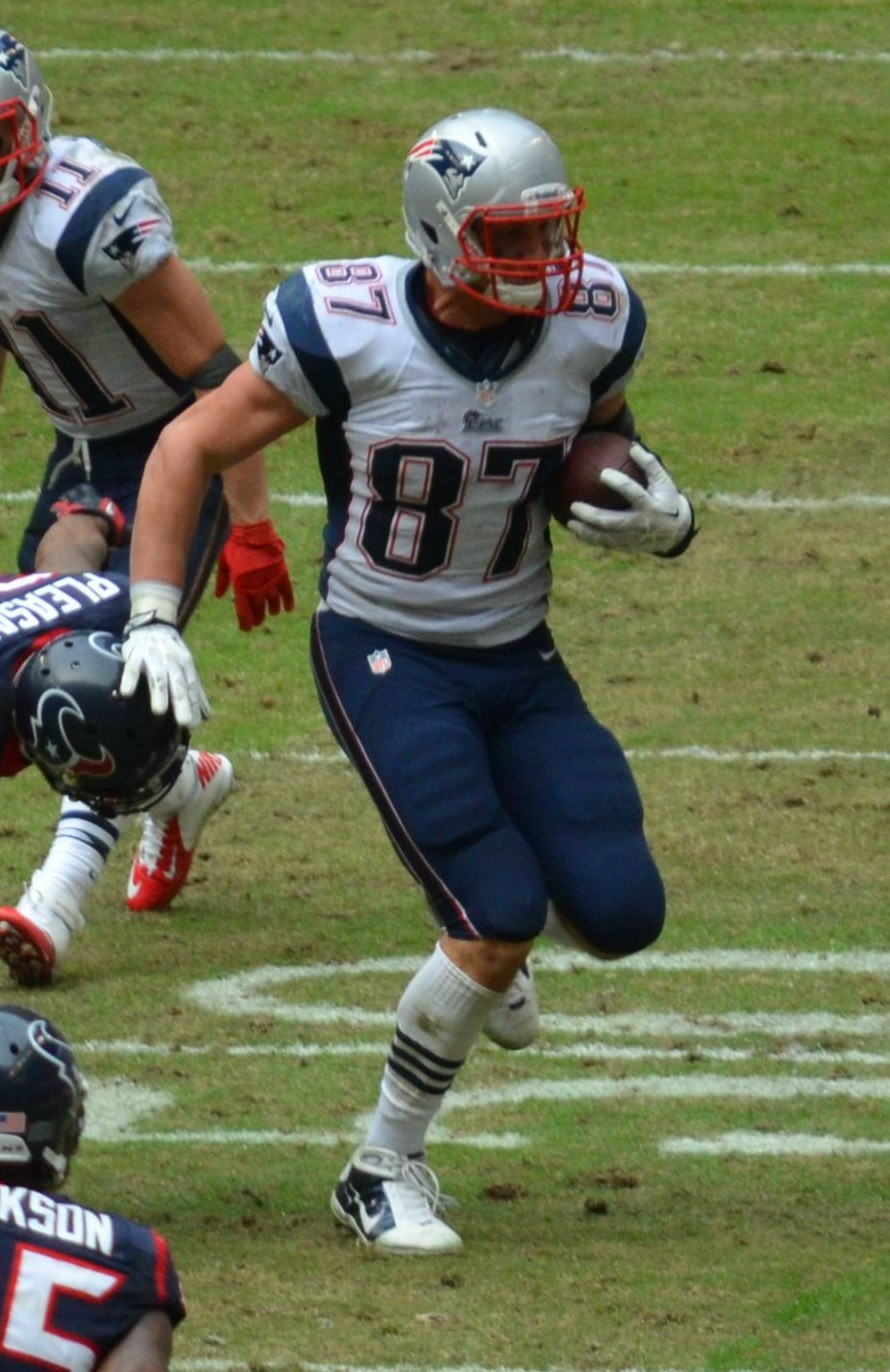
Gronkowski in 2013

==== 2013 season ====
In February 2013, Gronkowski was diagnosed with an infection in his forearm. He underwent an open procedure—the third on his forearm—in an effort to clear the infection; he was subsequently placed on a course of antibiotics. On May 20, 2013, Gronkowski underwent a fourth surgery on his forearm to replace the hardware implanted in the second procedure and perform tissue biopsies. ESPN's Adam Schefter reported that doctors were encouraged the infection had finally resolved. On June 18, 2013, Gronkowski underwent back surgery. He was cleared to play for the October 20, 2013, game against the New York Jets. In his return, he recorded three 100-yard receiving games in a six-game stretch. During a game against the Cleveland Browns on December 8, 2013, Gronkowski suffered a right knee injury after a direct hit from safety T. J. Ward. Gronkowski tore his ACL and MCL, which prematurely ended his 2013 season. In seven games, Gronkowski produced 592 receiving yards and four receiving touchdowns in six starts. Gronkowski was ranked 41st by his fellow players on the NFL Top 100 Players of 2014.

==== 2014 season ====
In his first game back from ACL/MCL surgery, Gronkowski managed to catch four passes for 40 receiving yards and a receiving touchdown against the Miami Dolphins in a losing effort, 33–20. He played on limited snaps as the Patriots worked him back to full strength slowly. Against the Minnesota Vikings in Week 2, Gronkowski had four receptions for 32 receiving yards in a 30–7 win. Against the Oakland Raiders in Week 3, Gronkowski had three receptions for 44 yards and his second touchdown of the season, and the only touchdown scored in the Patriots' 16–9 victory. Through Week 3, Gronkowski logged one start, 11 receptions, 116 receiving yards, and two receiving touchdowns on only 109 offensive snaps (42% of the team's offensive total). Gronkowski broke out in Week 8 against the Chicago Bears, catching nine passes for 149 yards and three receiving touchdowns in the 51–23 victory. In Week 14 against the San Diego Chargers, Gronkowski became the first tight end in NFL history to catch at least 10 touchdowns in four separate seasons. In the 23–14 victory, he had eight receptions for 87 yards and a touchdown. He finished the season with 82 receptions for 1,124 receiving yards and 12 receiving touchdowns. The Patriots finished with a 12–4 record and won the AFC East. Gronkowski earned his third Pro Bowl nomination and his second First Team-All Pro nomination for his 2014 season. His All-Pro nomination was unanimous, receiving all 50 votes. At the 2015 ESPY Awards, Gronkowski won the Comeback Player of the Year award for his 2014 season. He was ranked 10th by his fellow players on the NFL Top 100 Players of 2015.

==== 2014 postseason ====
In the Divisional Round against the Baltimore Ravens, he had seven receptions for 108 yards and a touchdown in the 35–31 victory. In the AFC Championship against the Indianapolis Colts, he had three receptions for 28 yards and a touchdown in the 45–7 victory. Gronkowski was a major factor in the Patriots' 28–24 Super Bowl XLIX win over the Seattle Seahawks, recording 6 catches for 68 yards and a touchdown late in the second quarter. Gronkowski was fined twice this season, once for "unnecessary roughness" against Indianapolis Colts safety Sergio Brown, and the other time occurring during Super Bowl XLIX. Gronkowski, among three others, was fined $8,628 for "striking an opponent".

==== 2015 season ====
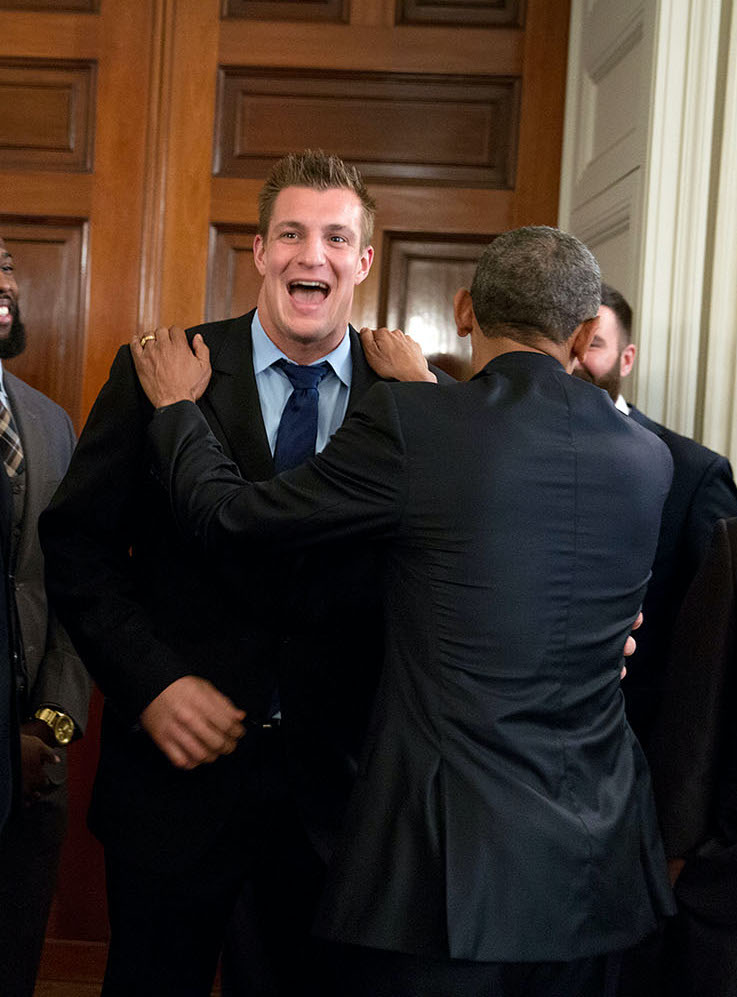
Gronkowski with then US President Barack Obama at an event to honor the team and their Super Bowl XLIX victory, at the White House on April 23, 2015.

During the Patriots' home opener on Thursday Night Football against the Pittsburgh Steelers on September 10, 2015, Gronkowski caught five passes for 94 yards, scoring three of the Patriots' four touchdowns in their 28–21 victory. The three-touchdown performance was the third in Gronkowski's career, one shy of wide receiver Randy Moss's team record of four. It also made Gronkowski the first player in NFL history with multiple three-touchdown-reception games against the Steelers. Through the Patriots' first six games, all victories, Gronkowski recorded 34 receptions for 533 yards and six touchdowns. He added 113 yards and a touchdown on October 29 in a 36–7 win over the Miami Dolphins. In the Patriots' first loss of the season, on November 29, 2015, against the Denver Broncos, Gronkowski had to be carted off the field after a right knee injury in the fourth quarter. Initial reports said that the injury appeared to be less serious than it originally looked.

After missing a week, Gronkowski returned for the Patriots' December 13 game against the Houston Texans. He caught four passes for 87 yards and a touchdown, for a total of 10 touchdowns and 1,018 yards on the season. The Patriots won, 27–6, to snap a two-game losing streak.

On December 20, Gronkowski caught five passes for 54 yards and one touchdown in a 33–16 win over the Tennessee Titans. He dedicated the touchdown to his friend Dana Parenteau, who had died at the age of 43 two days earlier.

In the Patriots' 27–20 win over the Kansas City Chiefs in the Divisional Round, Gronkowski caught seven passes for 83 yards and two touchdowns. In the AFC Championship, a 20–18 loss to the Denver Broncos, Gronkowski led all receivers with eight catches for 144 yards and a receiving touchdown. Gronkowski had the Patriots' final touchdown to put the Patriots within two points, but the resulting two-point conversion was unsuccessful.

Gronkowski was selected to the Pro Bowl and to the AP All-Pro first team for the fourth time in his career; he led all non-quarterbacks in fan voting for the Pro Bowl, and received 48 of 50 All-Pro votes at tight end. He was ranked as the ninth best player on the NFL Top 100 Players of 2016.

==== 2016 season ====
Gronkowski missed the first two games of the 2016 season due to a hamstring injury and was limited in his next two games. Against the Buffalo Bills in Week 8, Gronkowski scored the 69th regular-season touchdown of his career, which was also his 68th receiving touchdown. The touchdown broke both Patriots franchise records set by Stanley Morgan. In Week 10 against the Seattle Seahawks, he took a big hit to the chest by Earl Thomas which was initially thought to be a punctured lung but turned out to be a pulmonary contusion, keeping him out in Week 11. In Week 12 against the New York Jets, he suffered a back injury at the beginning of the second half, which needed surgery to repair a herniated disk, and was out for the season. He was officially placed on injured reserve on December 3, 2016, after having surgery the previous day. He finished the season with 25 receptions on 38 targets for 540 yards and three touchdowns. His 21.6 yards per reception ranked first among NFL tight ends in 2016. Gronkowski was on injured reserve when the Patriots won Super Bowl LI on February 5, 2017. In the game, the Patriots defeated the Atlanta Falcons by a score of 34–28, earning Gronkowski his second Super Bowl championship. Despite missing eight games, Gronkowski was still ranked 23rd by his peers on the NFL Top 100 Players of 2017.

==== 2017 season ====
Gronkowski began the 2017 season healthy after missing much of the previous season on the injured reserve list. Gronkowski injured his groin during a Week 2 victory over the New Orleans Saints, leaving the game early, but the injury did not result in missing any further games. Before the injury, he had recorded six receptions for 116 yards and a 53-yard touchdown. By the end of Week 4, he was occupying his familiar role as the team leader in receptions and receiving yardage, but a thigh contusion suffered in practice prior to the Thursday Night Football game against the Tampa Bay Buccaneers in Week 5 caused him to miss that game entirely. In Week 6, Gronkowski caught six passes for 83 receiving yards and two receiving touchdowns as the Patriots defeated the New York Jets by a score of 24–17. His 33-yard catch put the Patriots in the lead as well as overcoming a 14-point deficit. In Week 12, against the Miami Dolphins, Gronkowski caught five passes for 82 receiving yards and two receiving touchdowns. This was his 16th multiple touchdown game, which broke the franchise record previously held by Randy Moss.

During Week 13 against the Buffalo Bills, Gronkowski had nine receptions for 147 receiving yards as the Patriots won 23–3. However, after Bills rookie cornerback Tre'Davious White intercepted a pass intended for Gronkowski during the fourth quarter, Gronkowski responded by jumping elbow-first onto White, drawing a personal foul penalty and giving White a concussion. Gronkowski was upset, claiming that White should have been flagged for a pass interference penalty. On December 4, the day after the game, Gronkowski was suspended for one game for his hit on White. The next day, December 5, the NFL denied Gronkowski's appeal of the one-game suspension. With Gronkowski suspended for the Patriots' Week 14 game against the Miami Dolphins, the Patriots lost 20–27.

The following week, in a 27–24 win on the road against the Pittsburgh Steelers, Gronkowski caught nine passes for a career-high 168 yards. Gronkowski caught three consecutive passes for 69 yards on the Patriots' game-winning drive, and then caught the ensuing two-point conversion to put the Patriots up by 3. He eclipsed the 1,000-yard mark on the season for the fourth time in his career, joining Tony Gonzalez and Jason Witten as the only NFL tight ends with four 1,000-yard seasons. His performance in Week 15 earned him AFC Offensive Player of the Week. On December 19, 2017, Gronkowski was named to his fifth Pro Bowl. He finished the 2017 season with 69 receptions for 1,084 yards, most among tight ends, and eight touchdowns. In January 2018, he was named to the Associated Press' All-Pro First Team, earning him a $2.5 million incentive that was added to his contract during the 2017 offseason. The Patriots finished with a 13–3 record and earned a first round bye. In the Divisional Round against the Tennessee Titans, he finished with six receptions for receiving 81 yards and a receiving touchdown in the 35–14 victory. On January 21, 2018, Gronkowski suffered a concussion on a 21-yard reception during the AFC Championship Game against the Jacksonville Jaguars, being placed on concussion protocol, and did not return to the game. He would be cleared from the protocol just in time for Super Bowl LII against the Philadelphia Eagles. During the Super Bowl, he finished with 116 receiving yards and two touchdowns. In the closing seconds, he attempted to catch a Hail Mary pass, but failed, and the Patriots lost 41–33. He was ranked 15th by his fellow players on the NFL Top 100 Players of 2018.

==== 2018 season ====
The Patriots agreed to trade Gronkowski to the Detroit Lions in the offseason but the deal fell through after the tight end threatened to retire.

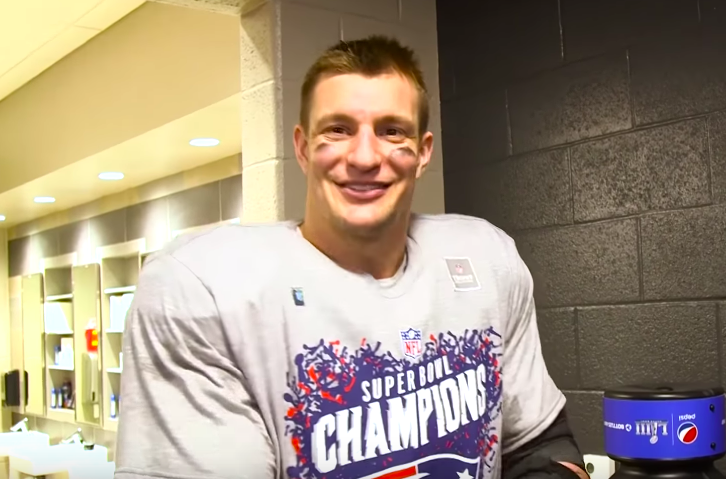
Gronkowski after winning Super Bowl LIII, 2019

On April 24, Gronkowski announced that he had met with head coach Bill Belichick and that he would return for the 2018 season. He returned to practice on June 5 after skipping minicamp, confirming his return. In the opening game against the Houston Texans, Gronkowski had seven receptions for 123 yards and one touchdown in a 27–20 victory. He also fumbled for the first time since 2012. However, in his next six games, Gronkowski had some limited production, totaling 22 receptions for 325 yards with no touchdowns. He scored his second touchdown of the season in the Week 12 victory over the New York Jets. In Week 14, against the Miami Dolphins, he had eight receptions for 107 receiving yards and a receiving touchdown in the 34–33 loss. In the loss, a last-second victory by the Dolphins, Gronkowski unsuccessfully was the last line of defense on the game-winning play. This stemmed from Gronkowski often taking the field as a hybrid safety to defend against Hail Mary passes. In the 2018 season, he finished with 47 receptions for 682 receiving yards and three receiving touchdowns.

The Patriots made the playoffs as the #2-seed in the AFC. In the Divisional Round against the Los Angeles Chargers, he had a 25-yard reception in the 41–28 victory. In the AFC Championship against the Kansas City Chiefs, he had six receptions for 79 receiving yards in the 37–31 overtime victory. During Super Bowl LIII against the Los Angeles Rams, Gronkowski finished with 87 receiving yards as the Patriots won 13–3. In the process, he set the record for catches and yards for tight ends in the Super Bowl with 23 catches and 297 yards. Gronkowski's biggest moment came when, with the score tied at 3 in the fourth quarter, he had a 29-yard catch from Tom Brady which took the Patriots to the two-yard line and set up the game's only touchdown, with Sony Michel scoring on a two-yard rush to put the Patriots ahead.

=== Initial retirement ===
"I said it from the beginning that I wouldn't come back to the game unless I'm feeling it, feeling healthy, and feeling ready to play. Taking a year off was hands down the best decision I made, not just in my career, but also for my health and well-being, and I would do that all over again."
–Gronkowski on coming out of retirement, April 2020

On March 24, 2019, after nine seasons, Gronkowski announced his retirement from the NFL, at 29 years old, via Instagram. He further elaborated on his decision five months later, saying that the pain and injuries he had suffered throughout his career had taken a toll on his mental health:

"I was not in a good place. Football was bringing me down, and I didn't like it. I was losing that joy in life... I could play right now if I wanted to play. I'm feeling good. Physically, I could do it. Mentally-wise, desire-wise, it's not there... I am very satisfied with where I am in life right now. I truly believe going through those tough times, nine years, off the field, on the field, has brought me to this point. I believe I'm on the right path in my life."

=== Tampa Bay Buccaneers ===
==== 2020 season ====
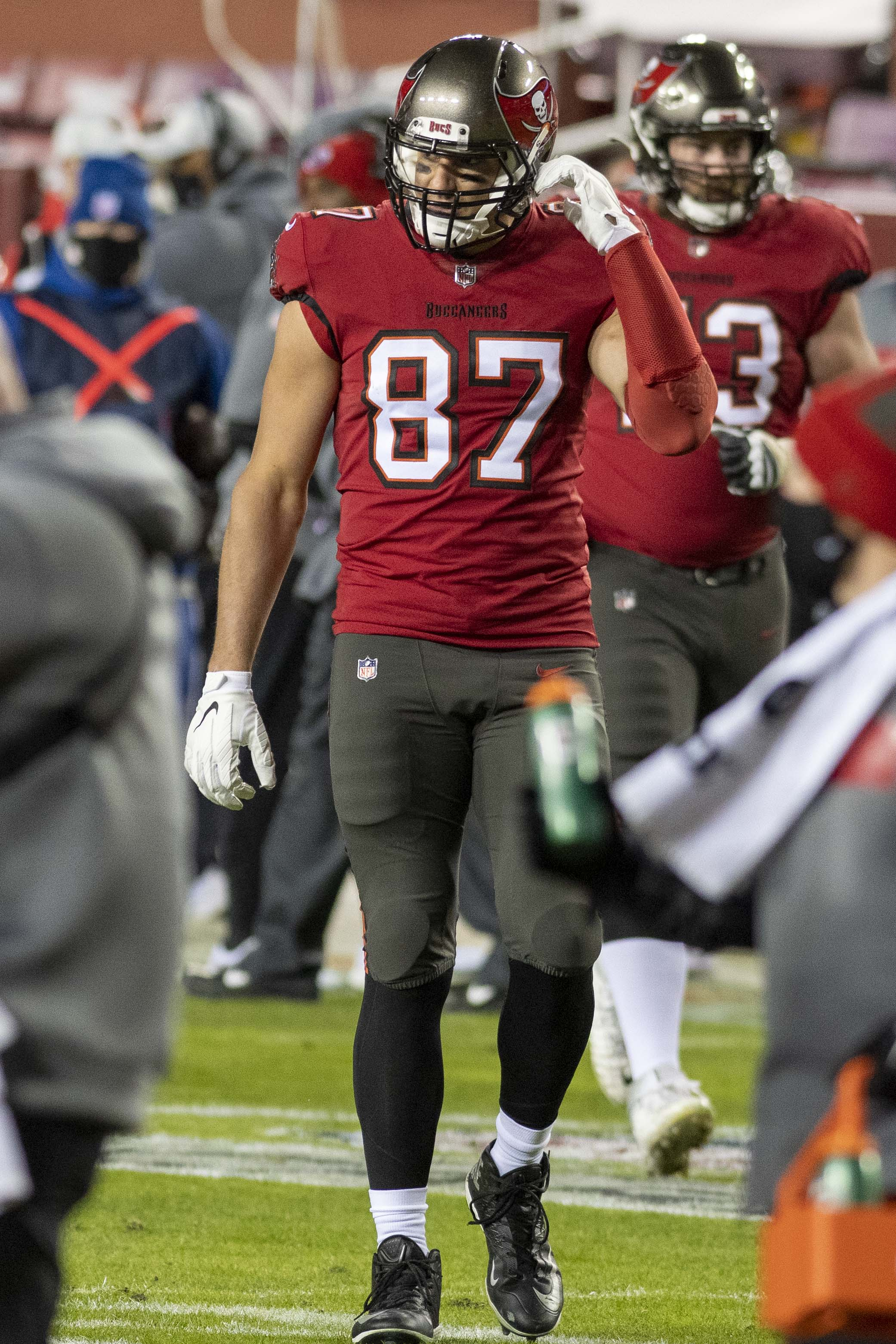
Gronkowski during the January 9, 2021, wild card game against the Washington Football Team

On April 21, 2020, Gronkowski agreed to come out of retirement. The Patriots, which still held Gronkowski's rights, traded him to the Tampa Bay Buccaneers along with a seventh-round pick in exchange for a compensatory fourth round pick in the 2020 NFL draft. The trade reunited him with his former Patriots teammate Tom Brady, who had signed with the Buccaneers a month prior. Head coach Bruce Arians stated that it was Brady himself who was adamant for the team to trade for Gronkowski.

On October 18, 2020, Gronkowski caught five passes for 78 yards and his first touchdown with the Buccaneers in a 38–10 victory over the Green Bay Packers. It was Gronkowski's first touchdown catch since December 9, 2018, against the Miami Dolphins. In Week 12 against the Kansas City Chiefs, Gronkowski recorded six catches for 106 yards during the 27–24 loss. In Week 16 against the Detroit Lions, Gronkowski recorded two catches for 58 yards that both resulted in touchdowns during the 47–7 win. Overall, he finished with 45 receptions for 623 receiving yards and seven receiving touchdowns.

Gronkowski's 29-yard catch towards the end of the fourth quarter of the NFC Championship Game set up the critical lead-extending field goal for Ryan Succop, with the Buccaneers winning 31–26 over the Packers.

Gronkowski caught two of the three touchdown passes thrown by Tom Brady in the Buccaneers' 31–9 victory over the Chiefs in Super Bowl LV. This gave him and Brady sole possession of the record for most postseason touchdowns between a quarterback and receiver, with 14. The duo was previously tied with Joe Montana and Jerry Rice for 12 postseason touchdowns. Gronkowski became the first player in NFL history to catch a pass in five different Super Bowls.

==== 2021 season ====
On March 22, 2021, Gronkowski re-signed with the Buccaneers on a one-year deal worth $10 million.

Though the 2020 season had been a rare season in which Gronkowski played all sixteen games, 2021 proved much more problematic for Gronkowski in terms of his health. The first two games were injury free. During the season opener against the Dallas Cowboys, Gronkowski had eight receptions for 90 yards and two touchdowns in a 31–29 victory. In Week 2, during a 48–25 win against the Atlanta Falcons, Gronkowski had four catches for 39 yards and two touchdowns. However, in a Week 3 game versus the Los Angeles Rams, he took a hit that resulted in multiple rib fractures and a punctured lung, which kept him essentially out of action for the next seven weeks, including a game against his former team in Foxborough, with the notable exception of an abortive attempt to return in Week 8, in which he played only a handful of snaps. When he returned in earnest in Week 11, he made six receptions on eight targets for 71 yards in a win over the New York Giants. He had his first 100+ yard receiving game in Week 12 against the Indianapolis Colts, leading all receivers with 123 yards on seven receptions, and followed that with his third multiple-touchdown game of the season, netting two end zone visits among his four catches for 58 yards in Week 13 against the Atlanta Falcons. This brought the Brady-Gronkowski connection to a total of 90 regular-season touchdowns, moving them on to second place on the all-time quarterback-receiver list, behind only Peyton Manning and Marvin Harrison. He finished the 2021 season with 55 receptions for 802 receiving yards and six receiving touchdowns. In the Wild Card Round against the Philadelphia Eagles, he had a receiving touchdown in the 31–15 victory. In the Divisional Round against the Los Angeles Rams, he had four receptions for 85 yards in the 30–27 loss to the eventual Super Bowl champions.

=== Second retirement ===
Gronkowski announced his retirement for a second time on June 21, 2022.

On November 9, 2025, Gronkowski announced he would sign a one-day contract with the New England Patriots to retire as a member of the Patriots organization. A press conference to commemorate the signing was held on November 12, 2025. At the conference, Patriots owner Robert Kraft revealed that he had originally planned for Gronkowski to sign the contract during his future Patriots Hall of Fame induction, but chose to do it immediately to honor the final wish of Susan Hurley—a friend of both Gronkowski and Kraft who had recently passed away from cancer.

On November 7, 2026, Gronkowski was inducted into the Patriots Hall of Fame.

== Career statistics ==
Legend
	Won the Super Bowl
	Led the league
**Bold**	Career high

=== NFL ===
==== Regular season ====
Year	Team	Games		Receiving							Rushing					Fumbles	
Year	Team	GP	GS	Tgt	Rec	Yds	Avg	Lng	TD	FD	Att	Yds	Avg	Lng	TD	Fum	Lost
2010	NE	16	11	59	42	546	13.0	28	10	30	—	—	—	—	—	**1**	**1**
2011	NE	16	16	124	**90**	**1,327**	14.7	52T	**17**	**69**	**1**	**2**	**2.0**	**2T**	**1**	0	0
2012	NE	11	11	79	55	790	14.4	41	11	45	—	—	—	—	—	**1**	**1**
2013	NE	7	6	66	39	592	15.2	50	4	31	—	—	—	—	—	0	0
2014	NE	15	10	**131**	82	1,124	13.7	46T	12	60	—	—	—	—	—	0	0
2015	NE	15	15	120	72	1,176	16.3	**76T**	11	52	—	—	—	—	—	0	0
2016	NE	8	6	38	25	540	**21.6**	53	3	20	—	—	—	—	—	0	0
2017	NE	14	14	105	69	1,084	15.7	53T	8	57	—	—	—	—	—	**1**	0
2018	NE	13	11	72	47	682	14.5	42	3	34	—	—	—	—	—	**1**	**1**
2020	TB	16	16	77	45	623	13.8	48	7	29	—	—	—	—	—	**1**	0
2021	TB	12	12	89	55	802	14.6	42	6	34	—	—	—	—	—	0	0
Career		142	127	960	621	9,286	14.9	76T	92	461	1	2	2.0	2T	1	5	3

==== Postseason ====
Year	Team	Games		Receiving							Rushing					Fumbles	
Year	Team	GP	GS	Tgt	Rec	Yds	Avg	Lng	TD	FD	Att	Yds	Avg	Lng	TD	Fum	Lost
2010	NE	1	1	6	4	65	**16.3**	37	0	3	—	—	—	—	—	0	0
2011	NE	3	3	23	**17**	**258**	15.2	28	**3**	**15**	—	—	—	—	—	0	0
2012	NE	1	1	1	—	—	—	—	—	—	—	—	—	—	—	0	0
2013	NE	0	0	Did not play due to injury													
2014	NE	3	3	**31**	16	204	12.8	**46**	**3**	12	—	—	—	—	—	0	0
2015	NE	2	2	23	15	227	15.1	40	**3**	10	—	—	—	—	—	0	0
2016	NE	0	0	Did not play due to injury													
2017	NE	3	3	27	16	218	13.6	27	**3**	**15**	—	—	—	—	—	0	0
2018	NE	3	3	19	13	191	14.7	29	0	8	—	—	—	—	—	0	0
2020	TB	4	4	14	8	110	13.8	29	2	6	—	—	—	—	—	0	0
2021	TB	2	2	17	9	116	12.9	42	1	5	—	—	—	—	—	0	0
Career		22	22	161	98	1,389	14.2	46	15	74	0	0	0.0	0	0	0	0

=== College ===
Season	Team	GP	Receiving			
Season	Team	GP	Rec	Yds	Avg	TD
2007	Arizona	12	28	525	**18.8**	6
2008	Arizona	10	**47**	**672**	14.3	**10**
2009	Arizona	0	Did not play due to injury			
Career		22	75	1,197	16.0	16

== Career highlights ==
=== Awards and honors ===
NFL

- 4× Super Bowl champion (XLIX, LI, LIII, LV)
- NFL Comeback Player of the Year (2014)
- 4× First-team All-Pro (2011, 2014, 2015, 2017)
- NFL receiving touchdowns leader (2011)
- NFL 2010s All-Decade Team
- NFL 100th Anniversary All-Time Team
- PFWA All-Rookie Team (2010)
- New England Patriots Hall of Fame
- New England Patriots All-2010s Team
- New England Patriots All-Dynasty Team
- 7× NFL Top 100 — 21st (2012), 25th (2013), 41st (2014), 10th (2015), 9th (2016), 23rd (2017), 15th (2018)

College

- Third-team All-American (2008)
- First-team All-Pac-10 (2008)

Media

- 2021 ESPY Award – Outstanding Team (with the Tampa Bay Buccaneers)

Organizational

- 2019 USO-Metro Merit Award

Professional wrestling

- WWE
  - WWE 24/7 Championship (1 time)
  - Slammy Award (1 time)
    - Celebrity of the Year (2020)

=== Records ===
==== NFL records ====
===== Game/single-season records =====
- First tight end to lead the league in receiving touchdowns (2011)
- Most touchdown receptions by a tight end in season: 17 (2011)

===== Post-season records =====
- First tight end with 1,000+ career postseason receiving yards
- Most career receiving touchdowns by a tight end in Super Bowl history: 5

==== Patriots franchise records ====
- Most career touchdown receptions: 79
- Most games with multiple touchdowns: 16
- Most games with 100+ receiving yards by a tight end: 26
- Highest receiving yards per game average for a tight end (season): 82.9 (2011)

== Football legacy ==
Described as an "NFL supernova," a "sui generis," a "gold standard," a "generational marvel," and an "on-field force of nature," Gronkowski revolutionized the tight end position and became the envisioned archetype for which the position could and should be. For ESPN, "it felt like the tight end position was invented in response to his rare gifts, the singular marriage of power and grace he brought to the game."

Gronkowski was noted for his versatility, combining receiving ability associated with a wide receiver with the blocking skills of an offensive lineman. Listed at 6 ft 6 in (1.98 m) and 265 lb (120 kg), with hands measuring 10¾ inches, he was at times compared in physical terms to NBA players LeBron James and Shaquille O'Neal. Bill Belichick once remarked “In the ultimate team sport, Rob was a great, great teammate. His production spoke for itself, but his daily attitude, unmistakably positive energy wherever he went and toward whoever he touched will never be forgotten.” He was the highest ranked tight end in the annual NFL Top 100 Players five times, as voted by his peers. The Patriots also included him in its 2010s All-Decade Team. He has set several NFL records and was selected not only in the NFL 2010s All-Decade Team but also in the NFL's 100th Anniversary All-Time Team.

=== "Gronk Spike" ===
"Gronk is a one of a kind person, player and friend. He is one of the most positive people I have ever been around and he loves to have fun. What you see is what you get and whether he is dancing, singing, laughing, or spiking, he is true to himself."
–Teammate Tom Brady, 2015

Known for his exuberant personality, Gronkowski has been credited in resurrecting the spike as a touchdown celebration and making it his own. His signature "Gronk Spike" has been a product of the less restrictive scoring celebrations of the NFL compared to high school and college and debuted on September 26, 2010, after scoring his second NFL touchdown. It had become a fan phenomenon, with MIT Sloan Sports Analytics Conference calculating that Gronkowski's arm moves 130° with the football leaving his hand at 60 miles per hour delivering 650 pounds of force. He is also known to dance before spiking, and in 2012 imitated a Queen's Guard which he described as "that little nutcracker dude" before his touchdown celebration while playing at Wembley Stadium in the United Kingdom.

== Outside football ==
In July 2015, Gronkowski co-wrote a memoir titled It's Good to be Gronk with Jason Rosenhaus. It was published by Simon & Schuster's and Derek Jeter's Jeter Publishing and became a New York Times Bestseller.

Started in 2015, Gronkowski and his four brothers operate Gronk Fitness, a fitness business that sells Gronk-branded gym equipment and has partnerships with other fitness companies including Life Fitness and Xtreme Monkey.

Gronkowski has stated that partying improved his playing abilities, noting, "You go out and get refreshed, and it just makes you want to go back out on that practice field and keep going hard." During an on-air interview with ESPN Deportes after an AFC Championship win in 2012 he responded in Spanish answering, "¡Yo soy fiesta!" (literally, "I am party!") when asked how he will celebrate the victory. The clip went viral, and his Gronk Nation, L.L.C. later trademarked the catchphrase.

In 2019, Gronkowski entered ESPN's "World Fame 100" list of most famous athletes in the world; the outlet estimated his endorsement income the past year alone was $8 million. In March 2021, his first NFT card collection sold for $1.2 million.

In October 2020, ZooTampa at Lowry Park named their newly born greater one-horned rhino "Gronk" to celebrate Gronkowski joining the Tampa Bay Buccaneers.

In October 2024, Gronkowski partnered with his former teammate Julian Edelman and Assaf Swissa, founder of the creative agency Superdigital, to establish Nuthouse Sports (formerly Coast Productions). This entertainment studio launched the podcast "Dudes on Dudes with Gronk and Jules," which premiered on October 15, 2024.

=== Sponsorships and endorsements ===
Gronkowski has appeared in print, television and online advertisements for brands such as USAA, Nike, Dunkin' Donuts, Visa, T-Mobile, Tide, Lyft, JetBlue, Zynga, Cheerios, Oberto, SixStar Pro, Monster Energy, SMS Audio,Campbell's, Bodyarmor SuperDrink, DraftKings, Kids Footlocker, and video games Mobile Strike and Halo among others.

In 2012, PLB Sports began manufacturing "Gronk Flakes", a frosted cornflakes breakfast cereal named after and endorsed by Gronkowski. Its initial run of 64,800 boxes cost $3.99 each and available at Stop & Shop supermarkets in New England. After the success of the cereals, PLB Sports released "Gronk's Hot Sauce" in 2015. The following year Gronkowski and Monster Energy released a signature "Gronk" beverage distributed by Coca-Cola.

Gronkowski has appeared for several advertisements for Tide including commercials for Super Bowl LI. He was the endorser of Tide Pods, and consequently partnered with the brand for a public service announcement discouraging children and teens from eating the laundry detergent pods after a viral internet challenge in 2017–18.

In August 2019, Gronkowski credited cannabidiol (CBD) oil, the non-psychoactive component of cannabis plants, for making him pain-free for the first time in a decade, and has advocated sports governing bodies to allow players to use it for pain management.

=== Professional wrestling ===
A lifelong wrestling fan, Gronkowski first made a cameo appearance during the André the Giant Memorial Battle Royal at WrestleMania 33 in 2017 to help his friend Mojo Rawley. He hosted WrestleMania 36 which aired on April 4–5, 2020, and won the WWE 24/7 Championship on the second day of the event. After being the longest-reigning champion of the title in a single run, he eventually lost it to R-Truth on June 1, 2020. Later that year he won a Slammy Award as Celebrity of the Year in WWE.

=== Film, television and other media ===
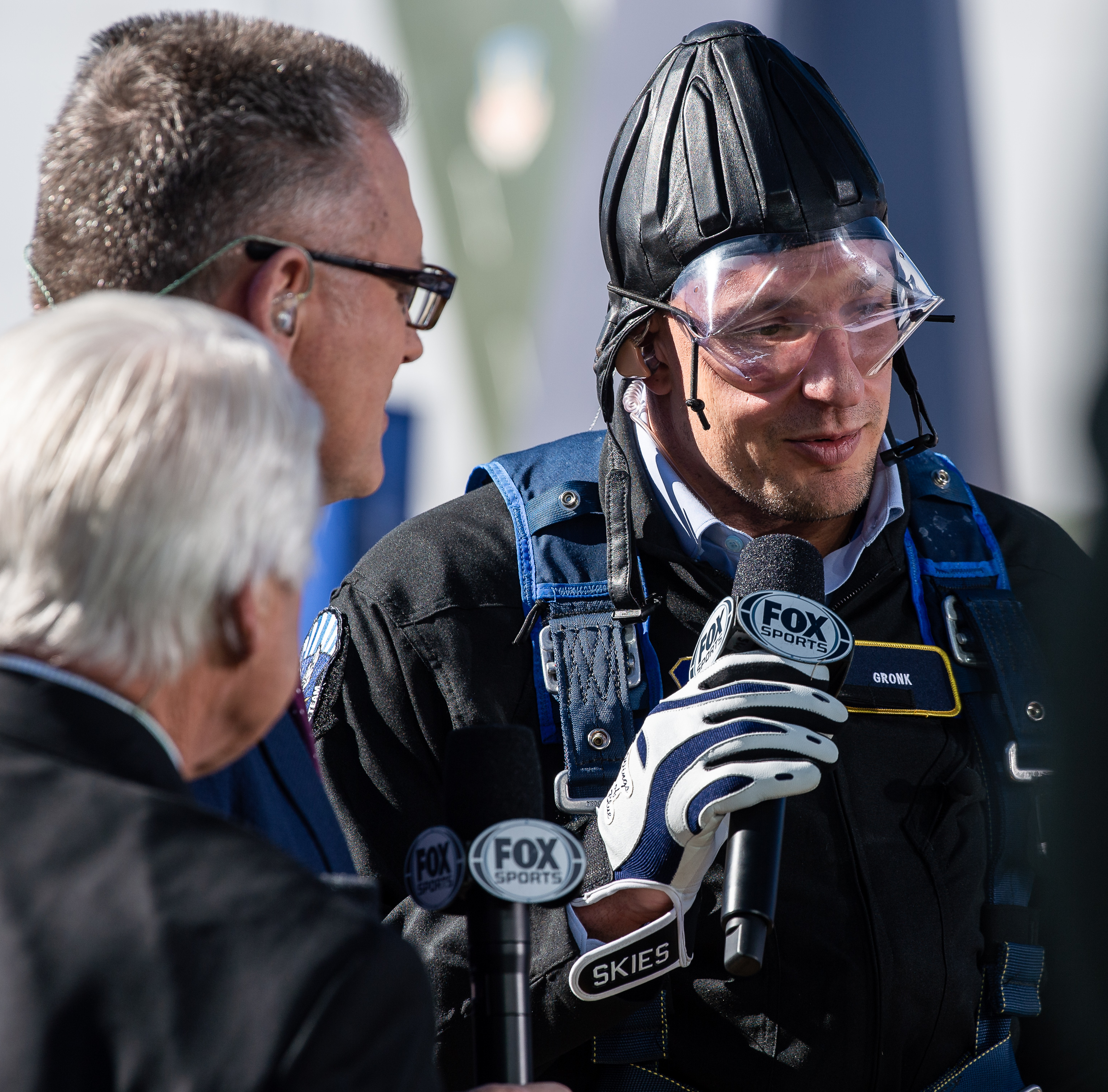
Gronkowski (right) on the set of Fox NFL Sunday in 2023

Gronkowski has been featured on the covers of GQ, ESPN The Magazine, ESPN The Body Issue, Sports Illustrated, and Muscle & Fitness among others. He was the cover of video sports game Madden NFL 17 published by EA Sports in 2016 for PlayStation 4, PlayStation 3, Xbox One and Xbox 360. The cover featured the tight end in his signature touchdown celebration called the "Gronk Spike".

An erotica novel inspired by Gronkowski called A Gronking To Remember, written by Lacey Noonan, was published in December 2014. It has been read aloud on broadcast by Gronkowski himself on Jimmy Kimmel Live!, as well as comedian Gilbert Gottfried, and rapper Travis Scott.

Gronkowski has appeared as fictionalized versions of himself in the 2015 film Entourage, a 2017 episode of Family Guy entitled "Gronkowsbees", The Simpsons episode "The Town", and has roles in the American crime-drama thriller film American Violence (2017) and You Can't Have It (2017) among others. He had been a co-host of Crashletes from 2016 to 2017 on Nickelodeon and competed in TBS's Drop the Mic in 2017. The same year, Gronkowski appeared on ABC's Shark Tank.

In 2017, Gronkowski executive produced and hosted Verizon's Go90 original show MVP in which "business owners and entrepreneurs pitch their products or services to a panel of VIP athletes who weigh in with their expert opinion." It had 36 episodes in two seasons. In July 2018, he joined Discovery Channel's Shark Week where he helped tag endangered tiger sharks in The Bahamas.

Gronkowski joined Fox Sports as an analyst for its NFL programming during his year-long retirement in 2019, making his on-air debut during Fox NFL Thursday. Gronkowski also co-hosted Fox's New Year's Eve with Steve Harvey in New York in 2019.

In 2020, Gronkowski competed on the third season of The Masked Singer as "White Tiger" where he made it to the Super Nine. In April 2020, he and his partner Camille Kostek starred in the music video of "I'll Wait" by Kygo. He also served as team captain in the sports-based comedy panel game Game On! which premiered on May 27, 2020, on CBS and ran for one season.

He co-hosted the 2022 Kids' Choice Awards with Miranda Cosgrove on April 9, 2022, on Nickelodeon.

On December 31, 2024, he appeared in Las Vegas as a co-host on Dick Clark's New Year's Rockin' Eve.

In May 2025, filming was completed on the movie Bad News on the Doorstep in which Gronkowski portrayed a football coach.

=== Charity ===
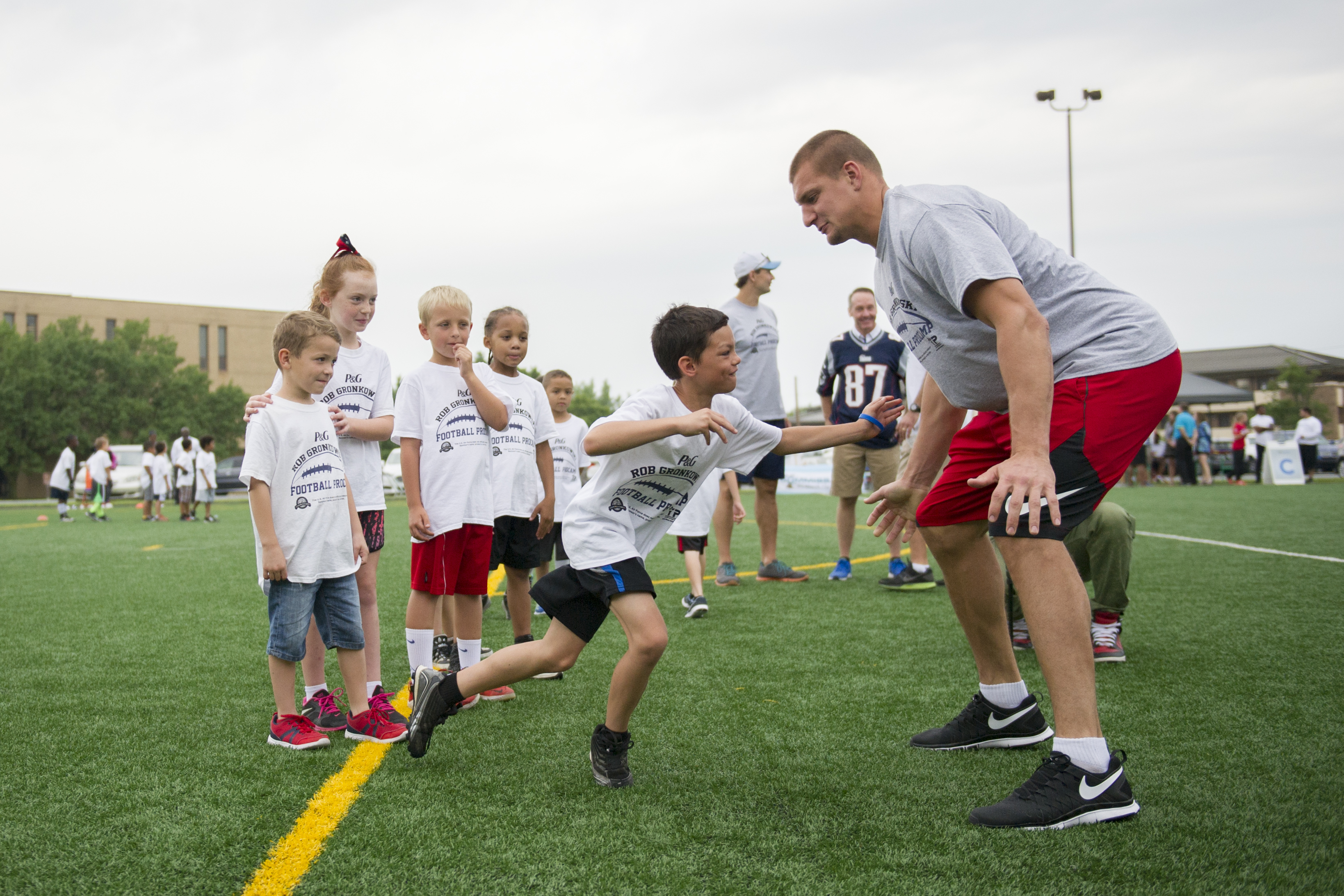
Gronkowski coaching military kids for a two-day football camp at Joint Base Andrews in Maryland in 2015.

Gronkowski set up the Gronk Nation Youth Foundation which is dedicated to "help kids stay actively involved in school and sports and provide them with the tools needed to help them follow their dreams and live a happy and more successful life". The foundation provides grants to sports programs with an emphasis on health, community and fitness. He stated, "I created the Gronk Nation Youth Foundation with my family and my friends, because growing up, I had a lot. I had everything as a kid, from playgrounds to sports, and a lot of people to play with, and thus everything I needed to be successful later as an athlete."

Aside from his own foundation, Gronkowski has also regularly helped the Make-A-Wish Foundation and the Patriots Foundation. In addition, he annually shaves his head for One Mission Buzz Off for kids with cancer. Noted for being generous with his time and resources, Gronkowski has also made several appearances at New England children's hospitals and schools to support local charities. In 2016, he received the Ron Burton Community Service Award from the New England Patriots for his charitable works and leadership in the local community.

On March 26, 2019, he accepted the Merit Award from United Service Organizations which recognizes "individuals of outstanding creative talent who are dedicated to serving others through volunteerism." On April 6, 2019, he was honored with the Wish Hero Award by the Make-A-Wish Foundation for his work on granting 14 wishes of children with life-threatening sicknesses during his professional football career.

Gronkowski and his partner Camille Kostek donated more than 20,000 pieces of personal protective equipment to hospitals and fire departments during the COVID-19 pandemic. In 2021, he donated $1.2 million to renovate the Charlesbank Playground at Boston's Charles River Esplanade hoping that "it will motivate kids to be outdoors, get fit and have fun".

In February 2023, Gronkowski formed a partnership with an animal health company to raise awareness about valley fever in animals. In September 2023, he met with members of the United States House of Representatives to discuss the development of a vaccine for valley fever.

== Personal life ==
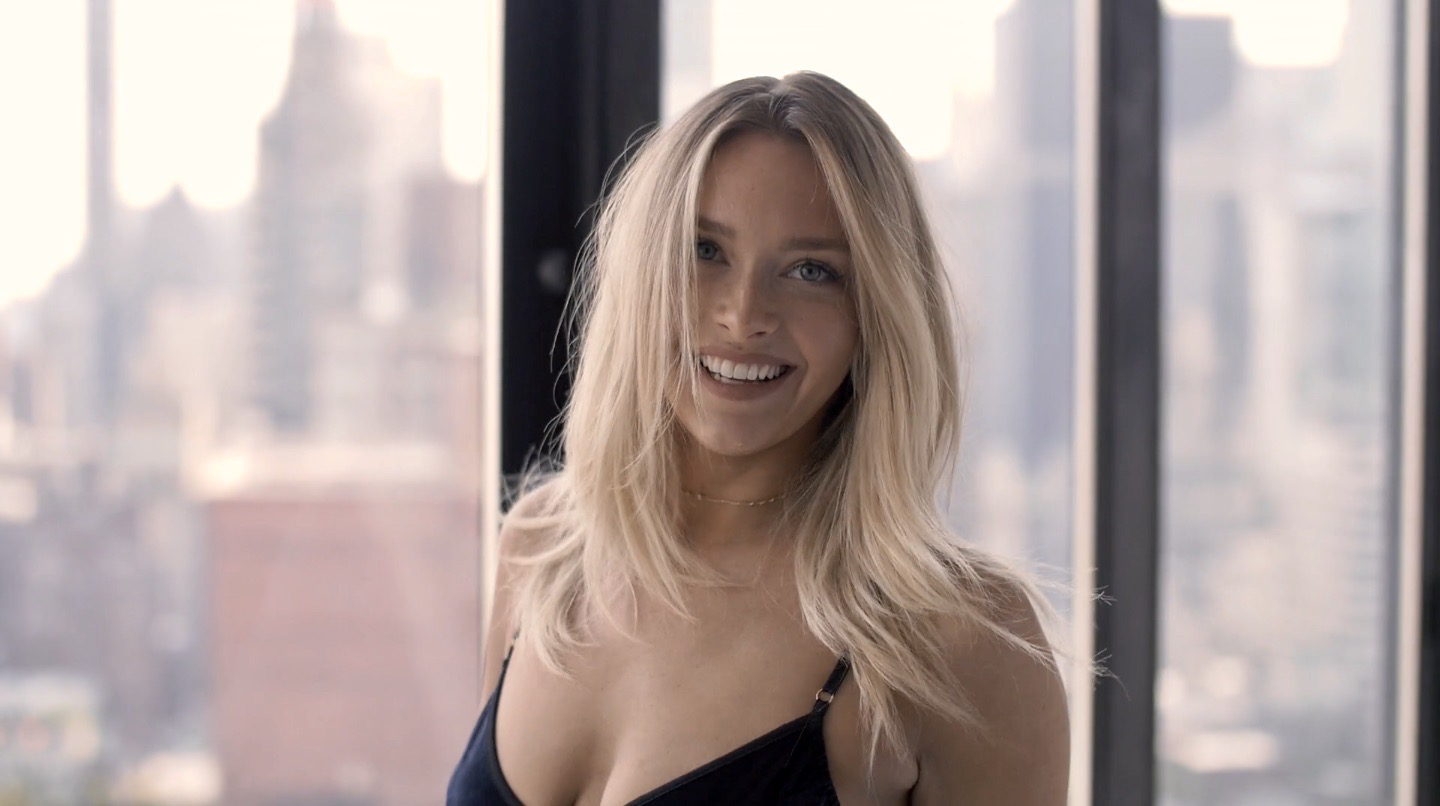
Gronkowski's long-time girlfriend, Camille Kostek

Since 2013, Gronkowski has been in a relationship with model Camille Kostek. They first met at a Patriots charity event on Thanksgiving 2013. They live in Foxborough, Massachusetts, and Tampa, Florida.

In 2015, Gronkowski stated that he had not spent any of the money he has made from his NFL contracts and strictly lived off the earnings from his business ventures, endorsement deals, and appearance fees.

== Selected filmography ==
=== Film ===
Year	Title	Role	Notes
2015	Entourage	Himself	Cameo
2017	American Violence	Brad	
2017	You Can't Have It	Officer Wheadon	
2017	The Clapper	Himself	Cameo
2018	Deported	Party Guy Jake	
2021	Boss Level	Gunner	
2023	80 for Brady	Himself	
2023	Good Burger 2	Himself	
2024	The Instigators	Himself	
2025	The Electric State	Blitz	Voice role
2025	The Roaring Game	Nickey	

=== Television ===
Year	Title	Role	Notes
2015	Big Brother 17	Himself	3 episodes
2016–2017	Crashletes	Host	
2017	MVP	Host	Also executive producer
2017	Family Guy	Himself	1 episode Voice only
2018	Shark Week's 50 Best Bites: "Monster Tag"	Himself	Also executive producer
2018	Unsportsmanlike Comedy with Rob Gronkowski	Himself	Also executive producer
2019; 2022–present	NFL on Fox	Football analyst	
2019	Fox's New Year's Eve with Steve Harvey	Host	
2020	The Masked Singer	White Tiger	
2020	WrestleMania 36	Host	Pay-per-view
2020	Game On!	Team captain	Also executive producer
2021	Nickelodeon's Unfiltered	Himself	Episode: "That's A Corny Dog!"
2024	The Tiny Chef Show	Himself	Episode: "Chips & Dip"

=== Music videos ===
Year	Title	Artist	Notes
2017	"Swish Swish"	Katy Perry feat. Nicki Minaj	
2017	"On My Mind"	3lau	
2020	"I'll Wait"	Kygo	with Camille Kostek

== See also ==
- List of celebrities who own cannabis businesses
- List of NFL annual receiving touchdowns leaders
- List of NFL individual records
- Gronkowski (horse), a racehorse named after, and partly owned by, Rob Gronkowski
