= Dan Gronkowski =

American football player (born 1985)

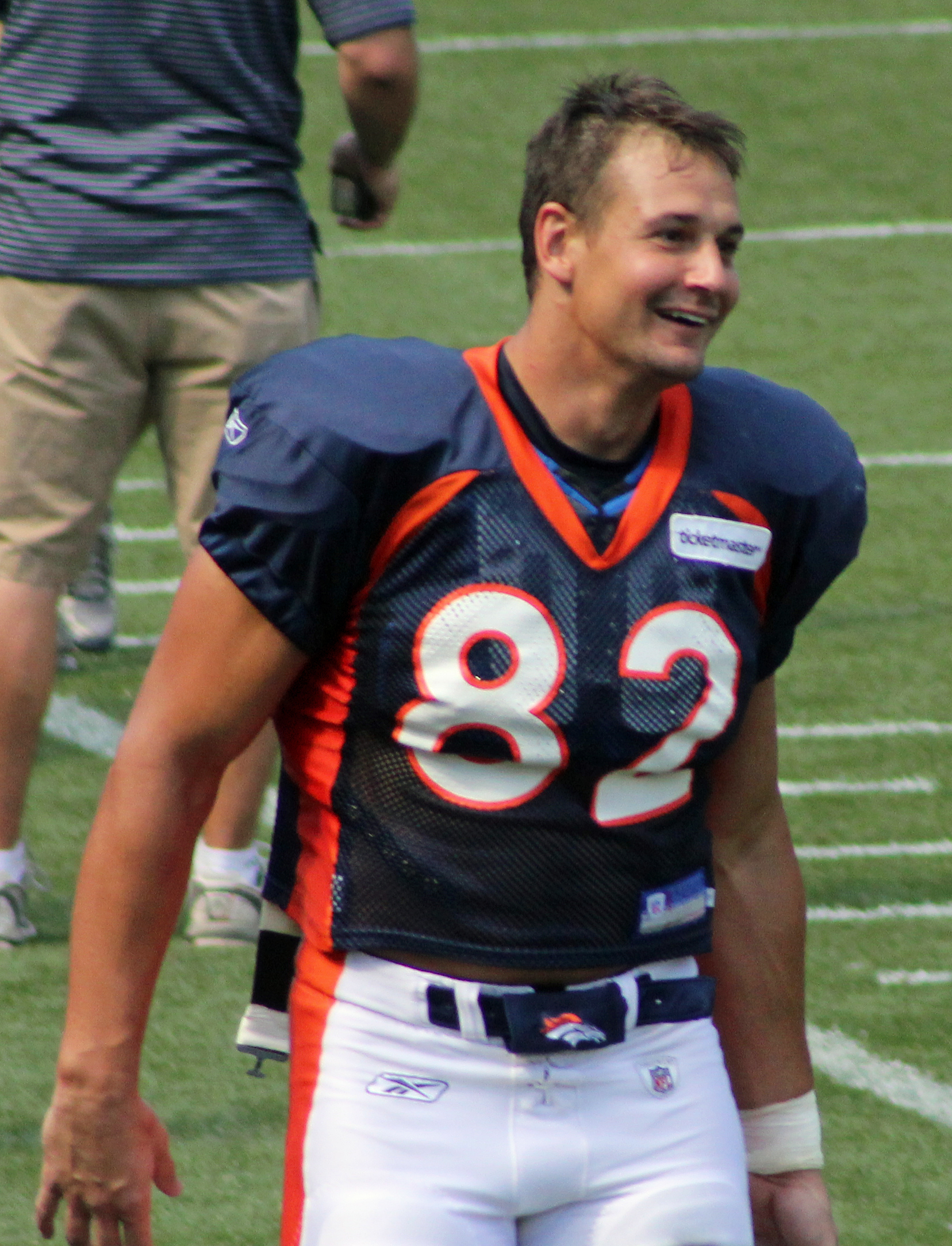
- Gronkowski with the Denver Broncos in 2011

No. 47, 82, 87
- Position: Tight end

Personal information
- Born: January 21, 1985 (age 41); Amherst, New York, U.S.
- Listed height: 6 ft 5 in (1.96 m)
- Listed weight: 255 lb (116 kg)

Career information
- High school: Williamsville North (Williamsville, New York)
- College: Maryland (2004–2008)
- NFL draft: 2009: 7th round, 255th overall pick

Career history
- Detroit Lions (2009); Denver Broncos (2010); New England Patriots (2011); Cleveland Browns (2011–2013)

Career NFL statistics
- Receptions: 9
- Receiving yards: 69
- Stats at Pro Football Reference

Daniel Thomas Gronkowski (born January 21, 1985) is an American former professional football player who was a tight end in the National Football League (NFL). He was selected by the Detroit Lions in the seventh round of the 2009 NFL draft, after playing college football for the Maryland Terrapins. He also played for the Denver Broncos, New England Patriots, and Cleveland Browns.

== Early life ==
Gronkowski was born in Amherst, New York, to parents Gordon, and Diane Walters. His four brothers – Gordie, Chris, Rob, and Glenn – all played collegiate sports, and later played professionally. His great-grandfather, Ignatius, was a member of the 1924 U.S. Olympic cycling team in Paris.

Gronkowski attended Williamsville North High School where he played football, baseball, basketball, and ice hockey. He was a two-year starting quarterback and a one-year starting wide receiver. As a sophomore in 2001, he set a then-school record with 539 receiving yards. During his senior year in 2003, he completed 122 of 207 passes for 1,407 yards and 16 touchdowns, all of which were school records. He was named the league offensive Most Valuable Player. He was recruited by Maryland, Arizona, Purdue, and Syracuse.

Gronkowski has a bachelor's in Marketing, and has a master's in Business Administration.

== College career ==
Gronkowski attended the University of Maryland, College Park, and sat out the 2004 season as a redshirt for the Terrapins. In 2005, he saw action in five games and made two receptions for 37 yards, including a career-long 25-yard touchdown reception from Sam Hollenbach. In 2006, he saw action in all 13 games including nine starts. He had two receptions for 11 yards. He received the George Boutselis Memorial Award for team's highest GPA. In 2007, Gronkowski played in 11 games including eight starts and caught seven passes for 66 yards. He received the team's C.P. "Lefty" McIntosh Award for public service.

In 2008, he played in all 13 games and started in 12. He caught 29 passes for 287 yards and three touchdowns, including one matching his career-long 25-yard reception in 2005. He also some action on special teams and returned two kicks for eight and four yards. He was named an honorable mention All-ACC player.

He earned a degree in marketing and was pursuing an MBA when he was drafted. He was also in the process to be nominated as a Rhodes Scholar his final year at the University of Maryland.

== Professional career ==
=== Pre-draft ===
Pre-draft measurables
Height	Weight	Arm length	Hand span	40-yard dash	10-yard split	20-yard split	20-yard shuttle	Three-cone drill	Vertical jump	Broad jump	Bench press
6 ft 5 1/2 in (1.97 m)	255 lb (116 kg)	34 1/2 in (0.88 m)	10 1/2 in (0.27 m)	4.80 s	1.64 s	2.77 s	4.26 s	6.92 s	33.0 in (0.84 m)	10 ft 2 in (3.10 m)	26 reps
All values from NFL Combine

Draft Countdown assessed him as the 21st-ranked tight end prospect for the 2009 NFL draft. The NFL Draft Scout ranked him the 11th out of 96 tight end prospects and projected him as a fifth or sixth round selection.

=== Detroit Lions ===
Gronkowski was selected 255th overall (2nd to last) by the Detroit Lions in the 2009 NFL draft. On June 25, 2009, he signed a three-year $1.21 million deal, which included a signing bonus of around $26,000. He was waived on September 5, 2009, and signed to the Lions' practice squad a day later.

Gronkowski was promoted to the active roster on December 1, 2009, after tight end Brandon Pettigrew was placed on injured reserve due to a knee injury. He caught his first pass against the Baltimore Ravens on December 13. He was waived on December 17, and re-signed to Lions' practice squad on December 20.

After his practice squad contract expired, Gronkowski was signed to a future reserve contract on January 5, 2010.

=== Denver Broncos ===
He was traded to the Denver Broncos on September 4, 2010, for cornerback Alphonso Smith. He was released on September 3, 2011.

=== New England Patriots ===
Gronkowski signed with the New England Patriots on September 6, 2011. However, after playing in two games, he was waived on September 23. He re-signed with the team on October 10. On November 8, 2011, Gronkowski was released for a second time.

=== Cleveland Browns ===
After Browns tight end Alex Smith was placed on the Injured Reserve, the Browns signed Gronkowski to a one-year contract on December 20, 2011. On August 31, 2012, he was released by the team but re-signed on January 3, 2013, to a futures deal. He was released by the team again on August 30, 2013.

== Personal life ==
After his NFL career, Gronkowski joined the family-run businesses including G&G Fitness and Gronk Fitness equipments where he is in charge of marketing and product development. He married Brittany M. Blujus on July 9, 2011, in Amherst, New York. They have three sons and two daughters.

In early 2021 Gronkowski, along with his family, opened a NexGen Fitness franchise studio in Buffalo, New York. It is a high-end, boutique personal training franchise currently operating personal training studios in Texas, Oklahoma, New York, and other locations.
