= 1919 in animation =

Events in 1919 in animation.

== Events ==
- Walt Disney starts working as an advertising artist at the Pesmen-Rubin Commercial Art Studio, where he meets Ub Iwerks. The two of them would co-found their own animation studio, Iwerks-Disney Commercial Artists
- Pat Sullivan establishes the Sullivan animation studios.
- Raoul Barré retires from the animation industry.
- J.R. Bray signs a contract with Goldwyn Pictures.

=== November ===
- November 9: The Sullivan Studios releases Feline Follies, which marks the debut of Felix the Cat.

== Films released ==
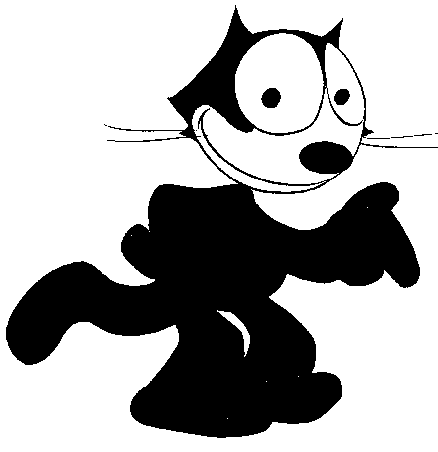
Drawing of Felix the Cat

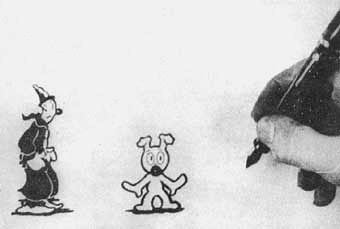
Drawing of Koko the Clown and Fitz the Dog

=== September ===
- September 28 – Farmer Al Falfa at the Bath (United States)

=== October ===
- October 26 – Some Sleeper (United States)

=== November ===
- November 9 – Feline Follies view (United States)
- November 16 – The Musical Mews (United States)
- November 23 – Farmer Al Falfa Solves the High Cost of Living (United States)

=== December ===
- December 14 – The Adventures of Felix (United States).

== Births ==
=== January ===
- January 13: Robert Stack, American actor (voice of Ultra Magnus in The Transformers: The Movie, ATF Agent Fleming in Beavis and Butt-Head Do America, Bob the Narrator in Hercules, Superintendent in Recess: School's Out, Stoat Muldoon in Butt-Ugly Martians, General in the Recess episode "A Genius Among Us", Narrator in The Angry Beavers episode "Home Loners", Reynolds Penland in the King of the Hill episode "The Trouble with Gribbles", Gordon/The Silver Shield in the Teamo Supremo episode "The Grandfather Show"), (d. 2003).
- January 27: Ross Bagdasarian, American animator, composer, singer and actor (creator of Alvin and the Chipmunks), (d. 1972).

=== February ===
- February 4: Janet Waldo, American actress (voice of Judy Jetson in The Jetsons, Granny Sweet in Precious Pupp, Alice in Alice in Wonderland or What's a Nice Kid like You Doing in a Place like This? and Alice Through the Looking Glass, Lana Lang in The Adventures of Superboy, Nancy in Shazzan, Penelope Pitstop in Wacky Races and The Perils of Penelope Pitstop, Josie in Josie and the Pussycats, Morticia Addams in The Addams Family, Princess in Battle of the Planets, Cindy Bear in Yogi's First Christmas, Hogatha in The Smurfs, continued voice of Pearl Slaghoople in The Flintstones), (d. 2016).
- February 5: Red Buttons, American actor and comedian (portrayed Hoagy in Pete's Dragon, voice of Robespieree in Gay Purr-ee, Milton in Rudolph and Frosty's Christmas in July), (d. 2006).
- February 11: Eva Gabor, Hungarian-American actress (voice of Duchess in The Aristocats, Bianca in The Rescuers and The Rescuers Down Under, Queen of Time in Nutcracker Fantasy), (d. 1995).
- February 24: Anthony Rizzo, Italian-American film director (Duck and Cover), (d. 2004).
- February 25: John Dunn, Scottish animator and animation writer (Walt Disney Company, Warner Bros. Cartoons, DePatie-Freleng, Spider-Man), (d. 1983).
- February 26: Mason Adams, American actor (voice of The Cat in the Hat in The Grinch Grinches the Cat in the Hat, Grandpa in Raggedy Ann & Andy: A Musical Adventure, Narrator in the CBS Storybreak episode "Arnold of the Ducks"), (d. 2005).

=== March ===
- March 3: Tadahito Mochinaga, Japanese animator and animation director (Manchukuo Film Association, Rankin/Bass), (d. 1999).
- March 15: Lawrence Tierney, American actor (voice of Rick in The Oz Kids, Don Brodka in The Simpsons episode "Marge Be Not Proud"), (d. 2002).

=== May ===
- May 1: Dan O'Herlihy, Irish actor (voice of Grant Walker in the Batman: The Animated Series episode "Deep Freeze", additional voices in The Pirates of Dark Water), (d. 2005).
- May 7: Stanislav Látal, Czech puppeteer, animator and film director (Adventures of Robinson Crusoe, a Sailor from York), (d. 1994).
- May 12: Vic Herman, American illustrator, designer, cartoonist, puppeteer, television producer and comics artist (Merrie Melodies), (d. 1999).

=== June ===
- June 17: Gene de Paul, American pianist, composer and songwriter (Walt Disney Animation Studios), (d. 1988).
- June 30: Piet van Elk, Dutch comics artist and animator (Stripfilm, Hanna-Barbera), (d. 1994).

=== July ===
- July 8: John David Wilson, British animator and animation producer (Walt Disney Company, UPA, Fine Arts Films, the animated opening sequence of Grease, Peter Pan and the Pirates), (d. 2013).
- July 14: Walt Stanchfield, American animator, writer and teacher (Walt Disney Studios), (d. 2000).
- July 19: Dallas McKennon, American actor (voice of Inspector Willoughby and Buzz Buzzard in Woody Woodpecker, the title character in Gumby, the zoo professor, Toughy, Pedro, and the Hyena in Lady and the Tramp, Diablo and Vernon in Sleeping Beauty, the Fox and one of the penguins in Mary Poppins, Max in How the Grinch Stole Christmas, Archie Andrews, Hot Dog and Mr. Weatherbee in The Archie Show), (d. 2009).
- July 21: Clark Haas, American comics artist, animator and animation producer (Clutch Cargo, Hanna-Barbera), (d. 1978).
- July 24: Todor Dinov, Bulgarian animator and comics artist, (d. 2004).

=== August ===
- August 2:
  - Tom Ray, American animator and film director (Warner Bros. Cartoons, John Sutherland Productions, MGM Animation/Visual Arts, DePatie-Freleng Enterprises, Ralph Bakshi, Filmation, Hanna-Barbera, Film Roman, Tiny Toon Adventures, Animaniacs), (d. 2010).
  - Nehemiah Persoff, American actor and painter (voice of Papa Mousekewitz in An American Tail), (d. 2022).
- August 16: Jean Sincere, American actress (voice of Mrs. Hogenson in The Incredibles), (d. 2013).

=== September ===
- September 2: Marge Champion, American dancer and actress (model for the title character in Snow White and the Seven Dwarfs, the Blue Fairy in Pinocchio, Hyacinth Hippo in Fantasia and Mr. Stork in Dumbo), (d. 2020).
- September 4:
  - Howard Morris, American actor (voice of Gopher in Winnie the Pooh and the Honey Tree and Winnie the Pooh and the Blustery Day, the title characters in Atom Ant and Munro, Mr. Peebles in Magilla Gorilla, Jughead Jones in The Archies, Professor Icenstein and Luigi La Bounci in Galaxy High, Flem in Cow & Chicken), (d. 2005).
  - Xavier Atencio, American animator and lyricist (Walt Disney Company), (d. 2017).
- September 15: Alfie Scopp, English-Canadian actor (voice of Charlie-in-The-Box in Rudolph the Red-Nosed Reindeer), (d. 2021).
- September 16: Andy Russell, American-Mexican singer and actor (sang the segment "Without You" in Make Mine Music), (d. 1992).
- September 24: Dayton Allen, American comedian and actor (voice of Deputy Dawg), (d. 2004).
- September 30: Kay Wright, American animator, television producer and comics artist (Walt Disney Company, Cambria Productions, Filmation, Hanna-Barbera), (d. 1999).

=== October ===
- October 11: Jean Vander Pyl, American actress (voice of Wilma Flintstone and Pebbles Flintstone in The Flintstones, Rosie the Robot Maid in The Jetsons, Goldie, Lola Glamour, Nurse LaRue in Top Cat, Winsome Witch in The Secret Squirrel Show, Ogee in Magilla Gorilla), (d. 1999).
- October 31: Daphne Oxenford, English actress (voice of several of the female kid characters in The Wind in the Willows, Mother in The Reluctant Dragon), (d. 2012)

=== November ===
- November 10: George Fenneman, American announcer (voice of the Narrator in The Simpsons episode "Marge on the Lam"), (d. 1997).
- November 19: Alan Young, English actor (voice of Scrooge McDuck in DuckTales, Farmer Smurf in The Smurfs, Grandpa Seville in Alvin and the Chipmunks, 7-Zark-7 and Keyop in Battle of the Planets, Haggis McHaggis in The Ren & Stimpy Show, Hiram Flaversham in The Great Mouse Detective), (d. 2016).
- November 26: Noel Coleman, English actor (narrator of Captain Pugwash), (d. 2007).

=== December ===
- December 17: Ted Berman, American animator, film director and screenwriter (Walt Disney Company), (d. 2001).
- December 21: Doug Young, American actor (voice of Doggie Daddy in The Quick Draw McGraw Show, Ding-A-Ling Wolf in The Huckleberry Hound Show, Yippee in The Peter Potamus Show), (d. 2018).
- December 23: Eugene Poddany, Chinese-born American composer (Warner Bros. Cartoons, MGM Animation/Visual Arts), (d. 1984).
- December 30: Homer Groening, Saskatchewan-American filmmaker and father of Matt Groening (namesake for Homer Simpson, produced and directed "A Study in Wet" which was used as the logo for The Curiosity Company), (d. 1996).

=== Specific date unknown ===
- George Wheeler, American animator and comics artist (Walt Disney Company, Hanna-Barbera, Filmation), (d. 1989).
- Julius Svendsen, Norwegian-American comics artist and animator (Walt Disney Animation Studios), (d. 1971).

== Deaths ==
=== January ===
- January 28: Leon Searl, American comics artist and animator (International Film Service), dies at age 38.
