= Woos Whoopee =

1928 film

- Directed by: Otto Messmer
- Written by: Pat Sullivan
- Produced by: Jacques Kopstein/Pat Sullivan
- Starring: Harry Edison
- Music by: Jacques Kopstein
- Production company: Copley Studios
- Distributed by: Copley Studios
- Release date: 1930
- Running time: 6:41
- Country: United States
- Language: English

Woos Whoopee (sometimes referred to as Felix the Cat in Woos Whoopee or Felix Woos Whoopee) is a surreal, animated 1930 Felix the Cat short subject produced by Pat Sullivan and directed by Otto Messmer.

== Summary ==
The short opens with a long shot of a large, urban building swaying in time to the loud strains of "There'll Be a Hot Time in the Old Town Tonight" within, added to the film in later years. Next, the entrance to the "Whoopee Club" is shown with letters spelling out the name of the establishment one at a time. The camera, and therefore the viewer, is "brought into" the club through the front door. A group of anthropomorphic barnyard animals, among them Felix the Cat, are shown drinking and carousing. Felix himself is first shown standing atop a table with a foaming mug of beer in hand. Party horns are blown and confetti is thrown in the air as Felix downs his mug of beer. At home is the unnamed "Mrs. Felix". She is first seen seated by a grandfather clock showing a time of 2:00. A rolling pin is in her right hand and her frequent looks at the time and her angry expressions make it clear as to her intended use of the implement.

The next scene is back at the Whoopee Club. Felix and a male rabbit are shown dancing solo in what appears to be a dance contest. The two stops and each pulls out a bottle of beer from within their selves and drink them in unison to the cheers of the onlooking animals.

A clock tower showing a time of 3 am raises its own dome. A hammer at the end of a mechanical arm extends out toward the left and strikes the hour on the dome; the Moon has a face a la the man in the Moon which visibly reacts to the sounding of the clock tower. Things are starting to quiet down in The Whoopee Club, but Felix continues to revel with party favors, using one to retrieve a bottle of beer from an unsuspecting rabbit patron. He downs the bottle, laughing the entire time and pirouettes into the camera, momentarily obscuring the scene until he pirouettes away, still laughing.

Mrs. Felix is now shown waiting and pacing by the grandfather clock (which shows a time of 3:30) in much the same style as her husband. The inebriated Felix waves a goodbye through the front door of the club to the patrons inside, falling off the front step as he turns to leave. He tips the entire top of his head as if it were a hat and staggers toward the camera and out of frame to the left.

Felix's hallucinations now begin in earnest as he staggers down the street with the surrounding buildings swaying in time to his steps. He staggers toward a street lamp and hugs the base for support. The lamp seems to come to life, kicking Felix away and then dusting itself off with a whisk broom. The lamp flings the broom in Felix's face and walks away. Felix tries to remove the broom, but the bristles remain in his face which he strokes as if it were a natural beard. He removes his tail, turns it into a walking stick and staggers after the street lamp in the manner of an arthritic old man. The lamp is seen sashaying down the street as if it were a woman with Felix in slow pursuit. The broom falls from Felix's face as he in turn falls to his knees, begging the street lamp to stop. Felix once again tips his ears in a salute; the street lamp reacts as if it were a shy young girl. Felix attempts to steady himself at the base of the lamp, but it shifts slightly causing him to fall. The lamp reacts with a funny little dance which infuriates Felix. He lunges for the street lamp which now turns into a sort of smoke-blowing dragon. Felix turns and runs toward the camera while the dragon's open mouth momentarily obscures the scene as it begins its pursuit.

By now, the hallucinations are becoming more vivid. The street and buildings undulate with Felix's steps. When he stops and sees no dragon behind him, he laughs it off until it suddenly reappears before him. Felix produces an atomizer and "extinguishes" the dragon, which disappears. The tip of Felix's tail was left slightly smoking, so he removes the tip and begins to smoke it as if it were a cigar.

The hallucinations continue as we see a charging elephant, lion and gorilla begin their pursuit. As Felix turns to run, a second lion appears, blocking his path. Felix's sudden lunge away from the lion flings him head first into a distant tree. More hallucinations appear in the form of a second elephant which morphs into a winged ape.

Proud of his escape from this latest danger, Felix produces another bottle of alcohol from his person and takes a swig. The bottle immediately produces a giant, striped snakelike creature with stubby legs and an odd protrusion on its head. This creature morphs into a small automobile. Felix removes his tail and uses it as a crank to start the engine. He speeds away and drives through an intersection controlled by a traffic policeman. The policeman turns toward Felix's wrecked car, puffs out his chest and shoots out the buttons of his uniform as if they were bullets. Felix is flung into the air, coming down to land in the mouth of a fish which then morphs into a saxophone which in turn spits out Felix. The saxophone then morphs into a bugle which sprouts legs and a horselike tail and takes off after the fleeing Felix.

Felix's pursuits end as he enters the front door of his home. He peeks through the keyhole and sees a bizarre, round-bodied creature flapping its wings and blinking its eyes. Felix laughs off this latest hallucination, removes his tail and inserts it into an umbrella stand. As he laughs and staggers, he suddenly remembers his wife, still pacing before the clock which now reads 6:00. Felix removes his shoes at the foot of the stairs before tiptoeing up. The stairs move as if they were piano keys as Felix falls to the foot of the stairs. Another hallucination begins; Felix finds himself back outside as a chicken laughs at his plight. As he begins to beat up the chicken, we see that in reality he is standing at the foot of his wife's bed punching out a feather pillow. An alarm clock on the windowsill shows a time of 3:00, but when Mrs. Felix kicks Felix off the bed, he lands in front of a cuckoo clock displaying a time of 6:00. As the cuckoo clock chimes six, Felix draws a large pistol from his pajamas and shoots the cuckoo. The effect of the explosion fades the cartoon to black, ending the story.

== Reception ==
Animation historian John Canemaker - who is otherwise extremely critical of the sound-era Felix cartoons - praised this short. In his book, Felix: The Twisted Tale of the World's Most Famous Cat, he describes Woos Whoopee as: "...one of the best Felix films ever made. The short has been dated 1928 as well as 1930... If it is from the former date, Woos Whoopee is an example of Messmer's lively direction in his prime; if the latter date, it can be seen as a last hurrah, a final burst of vibrant creative energy... Woos Whoopee contrasts responsible behavior with irresponsibility, controlled movement with uncontrollable energy, the restrictions of domesticity with the pleasures of freedom, sobriety with ecstasy."

== See also ==
- Felix the Cat filmography
