= Felix Kept On Walking =

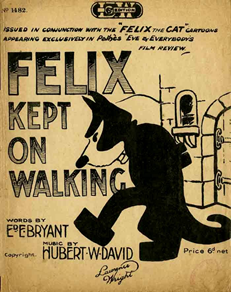

Song by Clarkson Rose
- Released: 1923
- Label: Lawrence Wright Music Company
- Songwriters: Hubert W. David, Ed E. Bryant

Audio song
- file; help

"Felix Kept On Walking" is a 1923 English comic novelty song. The song was written by Hubert W. David (music) and Ed E. Bryant (lyrics), and describes Felix the Cat having various fantastical escapades (being swallowed by a whale, skinned alive by cannibals, and so forth). The song was very popular during the 1920s.

Most verses start with "Felix kept on walking, kept on walking still" and are intended to show Felix's ability and determination to conquer these various obstacles and keep on going. The sheet music cover art, pictured at right, has Felix walking in front of a castle; the sheet music being published by Lawrence Wright in London, and the song by Worton David. (Note: Worton David was Hubert W. David's father; Hubert being just 17 when he wrote the music.)

A very similar title, "Felix the Cat Kept On Walking", was given to a 1925 American Felix the Cat cartoon short.

== History ==
"Felix Kept On Walking" was recorded in the 1920s by Clarkson Rose, the Jack Hylton Orchestra, the Savoy Havana Band, Ena Baga, Joe Loss and his Orchestra (as part of a medley), Reginald Dixon (also as part of a medley), Stanley Kirkby, and others, including the Original Capitol Orchestra, the Two Gilberts, the Pigmy Orchestra, Harry Fay, George Berry, and Eric Smart. A version by The Big Ben Banjo Band (with the Michael Sammes Singers) was recorded and released much later, in 1964. A revival band, Nicholas D. Ball's Savoy Havana Band, has included the song in its repertoire in the 21st century, playing an instrumental version at the Whitley Bay Jazz Festival in 2022.

Following on from the song's success in the United Kingdom, Bryant and David wrote another Felix song titled "Here He Is Again! (Being More Adventures Of Felix)" in 1924, also published by Worton David in London and relating the cat's further adventures, the same year in which Harry Tilsley released "Fido Followed Felix" in the United Kingdom, published in London by Cecil Lennox and giving Felix a companion dog that followed him on his globetrotting adventures.

A contemporary report in Film Daily stated:

In London today Felix is the recipient of an honor in that the most popular song of the day is entitled "Felix Kept on Walking" and it is being sung by many music hall performers. There are Felix handkerchiefs, Felix toys, Felix chinaware and an actor in vaudeville is made up to resemble Felix and struts in the same manner as Felix's peculiar walk.

— "The Felix Vogue". Film Daily. Vol. 10, no. 35. May 11, 1924. p. 16.

The song's first example describes Felix blithely brushing off a harrowing problem (being blown up); the song goes on to offer several more fantastical escapades of this type:

...[N]o matter where he goes or what occurs to him,
Felix keeps on walking, keeps on walking still.
With his hands behind him, you will always find him.
Blew him up with dynamite, but him they couldn't kill.
Miles up in the air he flew, he just murmured "Toodle-oo!"
Landed down in Timbuctoo, and kept on walking still.

"Felix keeps on walking" was briefly a minor catchphrase of the 1920s. According to Eric Partridge (citing the Collins Idiom Dictionary), this was inspired by Felix's iconic pacing in circles, head down, hand behind his back, when pondering some situation, as seen in his cartoons (and on the cover of the song's sheet music). Partridge gives the date as "the 1920s", not indicating whether the idiom preceded and inspired the title of this song, or was coined by David and Bryant.

== Cartoon ==
"Felix the Cat Kept On Walking" is a 1925 cartoon short released by Educational Pictures, featuring Felix the Cat. The black-and-white silent short (under ten minutes) was released on December 27, 1925. The producer is Pat Sullivan, and the director is Otto Messmer. Despite various sources indicating that the cartoon inspired the song (which seems chronologically impossible), whether or not Sullivan and Mesmer took their cartoon's title from the song may be now lost to history, but they are broadly similar. As is typical of cartoons of the time, various impossible events and situations are shown, and surreal sight gags.

The film had one reel.

=== Plot ===
On the advice of a poet, Felix the Cat "tries to walk to the edge the horizon". He overcomes various obstacles and every time he faces one, he "keeps on walking"; for instance, he manages to cross the Atlantic Ocean by stepping on the backs of fishes; he is kicked from England to Egypt. Eventually, Felix has completed a journey around the world to return to his home.
