= Henry Mayer (cartoonist) =

German-American cartoonist and animator

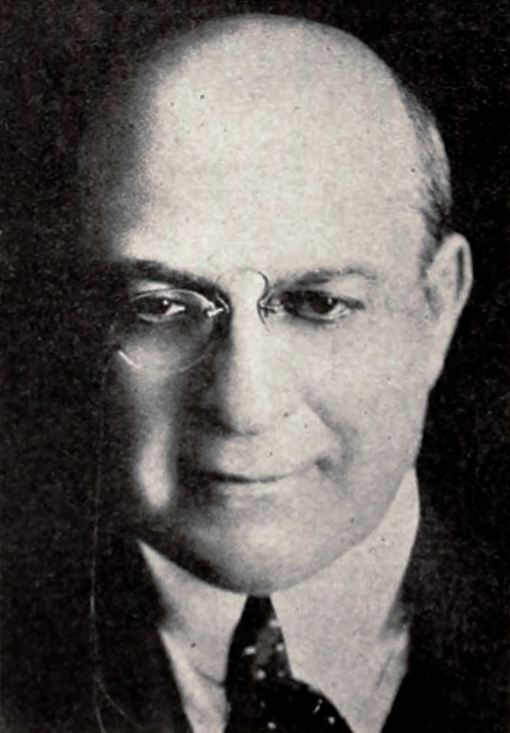
Henry Mayer, 1922

Henry Mayer (18 July 1868 – 27 September 1954), often seen as Hy Mayer in signatures, using the traditional abbreviation for Henry, was a German-American editorial cartoonist, comic artist, children's book illustrator and animator.

== Biography ==
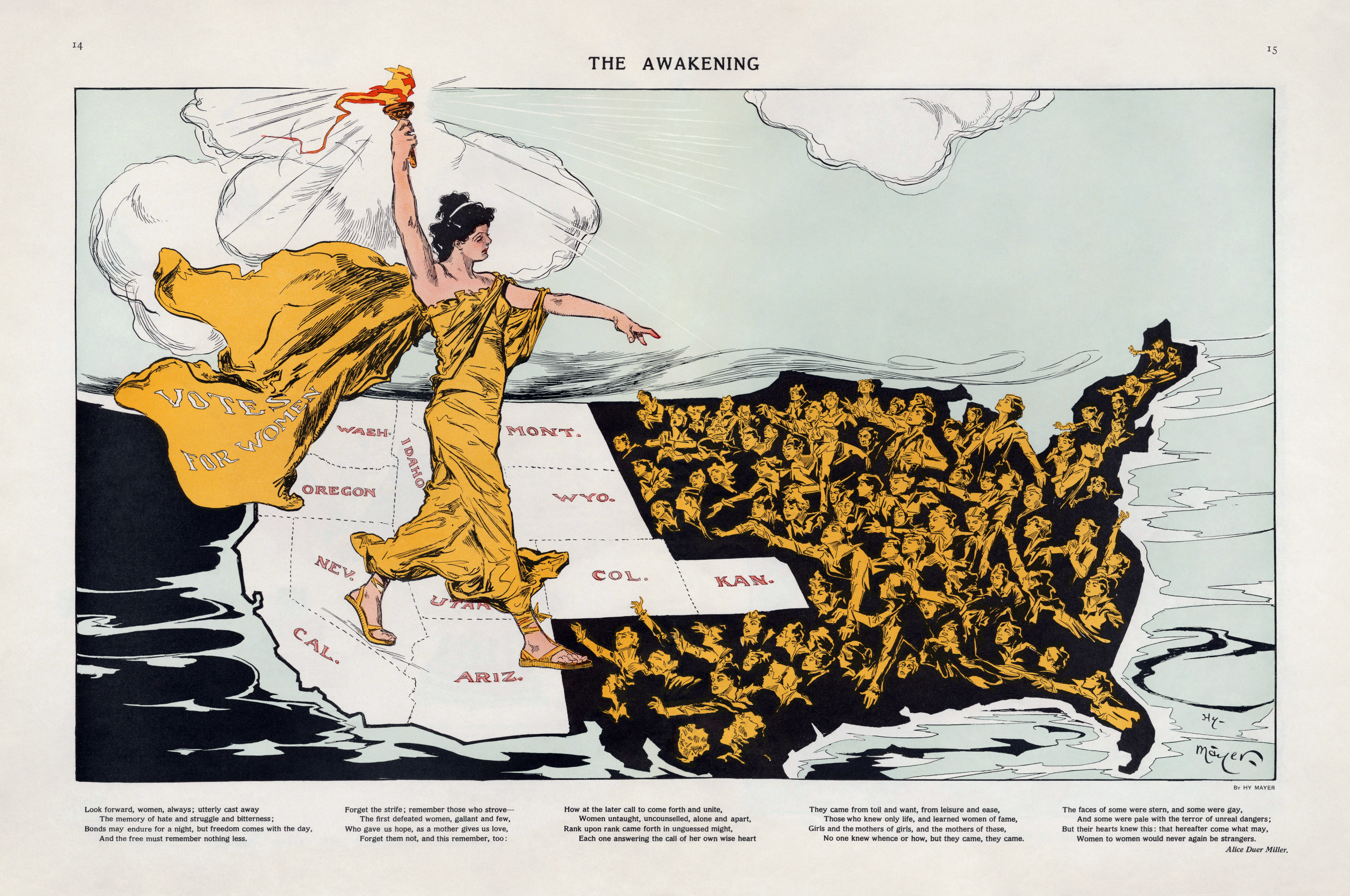
The Awakening. Suffragists were successful in the West; their torch awakens the women struggling in the East and South in this cartoon by Henry Mayer in Puck 20 February 1915

Mayer was born in Worms, Germany, the son of a Jewish merchant from London. After working as a magazine illustrator in Munich, Paris (Le Figaro Illustré), and London (Pall Mall Gazette), he emigrated to the United States in 1886. In 1893 he moved to New York, and illustrated a number of children's books. He was a political cartoonist for the New York Times from 1904, and then in 1914 chief cartoonist of Puck. From 1909 to 1917 he contributed artwork to early films such as the Universal Animated Weekly newsreel series. He created and directed the original "Travelaughs" series, released through Universal Studios from 1913 to 1920, and the "Such Is Life" series, with titles Such Is Life at a County Fair (1921) and Such Is Life in Munich (1922), released by Film Booking Offices of America from 1920 to 1926. These two short subject film series combined animation with live action film taken in exotic locations. He is credited with directing over 100 short films from 1913 to 1926.

Mayer also worked with Otto Messmer on the series The Travels of Teddy, satirizing President Teddy Roosevelt, before Messmer left to work with producer Pat Sullivan on the long-running Felix the Cat animation series.

Mayer was an artist member of the Salmagundi Club New York beginning in 1898.

He died in South Norwalk, Connecticut, United States.
