= Felix the Cat =

Cartoon character

- Felix the Cat hand-drawn by Otto Messmer.
- First appearance: Feline Follies (November 9, 1919) – as Master Tom; The Adventures of Felix (1919) – as Felix
- Created by: Pat Sullivan; Otto Messmer
- Designed by: Pat Sullivan and Otto Messmer (1919–1924); Bill Nolan (1924–1931; 1936); Otto Messmer (1932–1955); Joe Oriolo (1955–1984); Don Oriolo (1984–present)
- Portrayed by: Rick Davis (1975–1977, 1982)
- Voiced by: English; Harry Edison (1929–1930); Walter Tetley (1936); Jack Mercer (1959–1961); Ken Roberts (1959); David Kolin (1989); Jim Pike (1989); Thom Adcox-Hernandez (1995–1996); Charlie Adler (1996–1997); Don Oriolo (2000–2001); Denise Nejame (2000–2001; Baby); Dave Coulier (2004); Lani Minella (2004); Japanese; Toshihiko Seki (2000–2001); Yumi Tōma (2000–2001; Baby)

In-universe information
- Species: Cat
- Gender: Male
- Family: Inky and Winky (nephews)
- Significant others: Kitty (named Kitty White or Marie in the first 3 years of the silent cartoons)
- Nationality: American

Felix the Cat is a cartoon character created in 1919 by Otto Messmer and Pat Sullivan during the silent film era. An anthropomorphic juvenile black cat with white eyes, a black body, and a giant grin, he is often considered one of the most recognized cartoon characters in history. Felix was the first fully realized recurring animal character in the history of American film animation.

Felix originated from the studio of Australian cartoonist-film entrepreneur Pat Sullivan. Either Sullivan himself or his lead animator, American Otto Messmer, created the character. What is certain is that Felix emerged from Sullivan's studio, and cartoons featuring the character became well known in popular culture. Aside from the animated shorts, Felix starred in a comic strip (drawn by Sullivan, Messmer and later Joe Oriolo) beginning in 1923, and his image soon adorned merchandise such as ceramics, toys, and postcards. Several manufacturers made stuffed Felix toys. Jazz bands such as Paul Whiteman's played songs about him (1923's "Felix Kept On Walking" and others).

By the late 1920s, with the arrival of sound cartoons, Felix's success was fading. The new Disney shorts of Mickey Mouse made the silent offerings of Sullivan and Messmer, who were then unwilling to move to sound production, seem outdated. In 1929, Sullivan decided to make the transition and began distributing Felix sound cartoons through Copley Pictures. The sound Felix shorts proved to be a failure and the operation ended in 1932. Felix saw a brief three-cartoon resurrection in 1936 by the Van Beuren Studios.

Felix cartoons made their American television debut in 1953. Joe Oriolo introduced a redesigned, "long-legged" Felix, with longer legs, a much smaller body, and a larger, rounder head with no whiskers. Oriolo also added new characters and gave Felix a "Magic Bag of Tricks" that could assume an infinite variety of shapes at Felix's behest. The cat has since starred in other television programs and in two feature films. As of the 2010s, Felix is featured on a variety of merchandise from clothing to toys. Joe's son Don Oriolo later assumed creative control of Felix.

Felix the Cat entered the public domain in 1994 under the Copyright Act of 1976, however the character's name still remains trademarked. In 2014, Don Oriolo sold the trademark and remaining copyrights to the character to DreamWorks Animation via DreamWorks Classics, which is now part of Comcast's NBCUniversal division via Universal Pictures.

In 2002, TV Guide ranked Felix the Cat number 28 on its "50 Greatest Cartoon Characters of All Time and in 2004 ranked Feilx the Cat number 36 in Animal Planet 50 Greatest movie animal list.

== History ==
=== Background ===
In mid-1915, with the financial backing of then-Universal treasure Pat Powers, Australian cartoonist Pat Sullivan opened his own studio in New York City, and set about creating an animated adaptation of his William F. Marriner's comic strip Sambo and His Funny Noises strip - about a stereotypical African American child - which he renamed as Sammy Johnsin to avoid paying Marriner's estate royatlies. While at Universal, Sullivan met a young aspiring animator named Otto Messmer who had created a short entitled Motor Matt. Messmer eventually went to work for Sullivan in early-1916, and quickly became his top animator. By 1917 Messmer was directing many of the studio's films while Sullivan concentrated on business matters. A total of twelve Sammy Johnsin cartoons were made between 1916 and 1917, before being discontinued. The studio replaced the Sammy Johnsin series with several other short lived series including: Fearless Freddy and Willie Slate by Messmer, and Willie Winks, Boomer Bill, Boxcar Bill and Hardrock Doome by Sullivan and other members of the staff - as well as various one-shot cartoons. In early-1917, Sullivan arranged a deal with Charlie Chaplin, to produce a series based on his character of The Tramp. Chaplin sent thirty photographs of himself in different poses to serve as a guide for Messmer and the animators which would later profoundly influence Felix. Work on the Chaplin series was interrupted when the studio closed for nine months between 1917-18 due to Sullivan's arrest and imprisonment, during which time Messmer was drafted into World War I. After Sullivan's release in mid-1918, the studio re-opened and work on the Chaplin series resumed with Sullivan hiring Bill Cause as a temporary replacement, until Messmer was able to return on May 28, 1919. The Sullivan studio made a total of ten Chaplin cartoons before concluding series in October 1919.

=== Creation and authorship dispute ===
Feline Follies by Pat Sullivan, silent, 1919

Felix in Hollywood by Pat Sullivan, silent, 1923

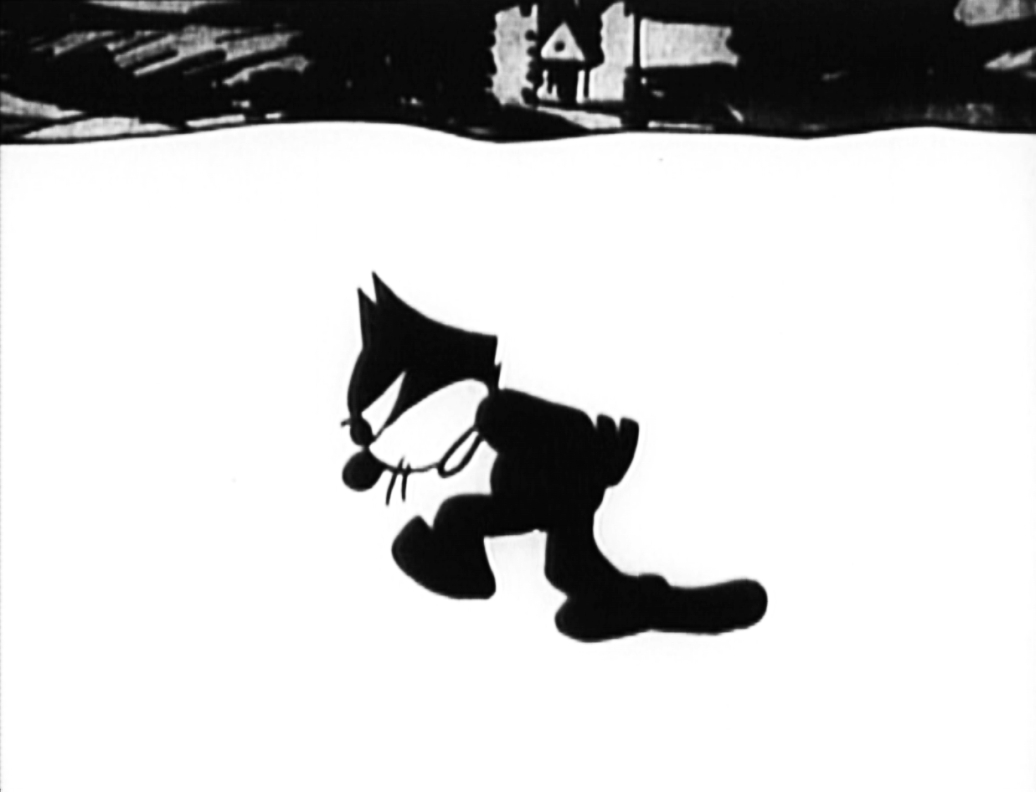
The "Felix pace" as seen in Oceantics (1930)

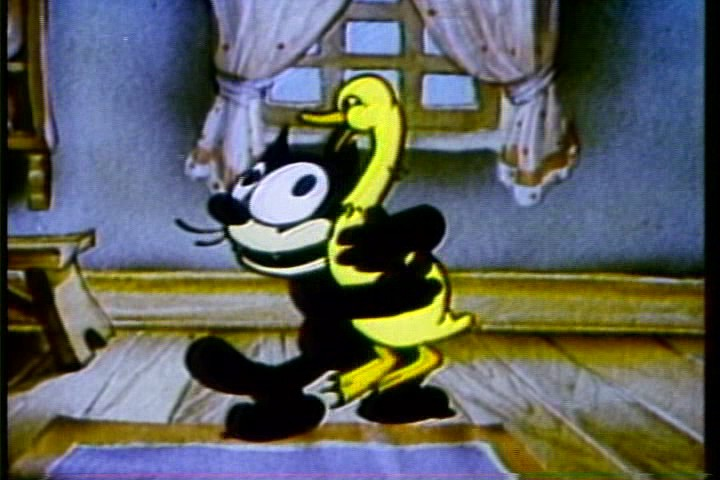
Felix in the color cartoon Felix the Cat and the Goose That Laid the Golden Egg (1936)

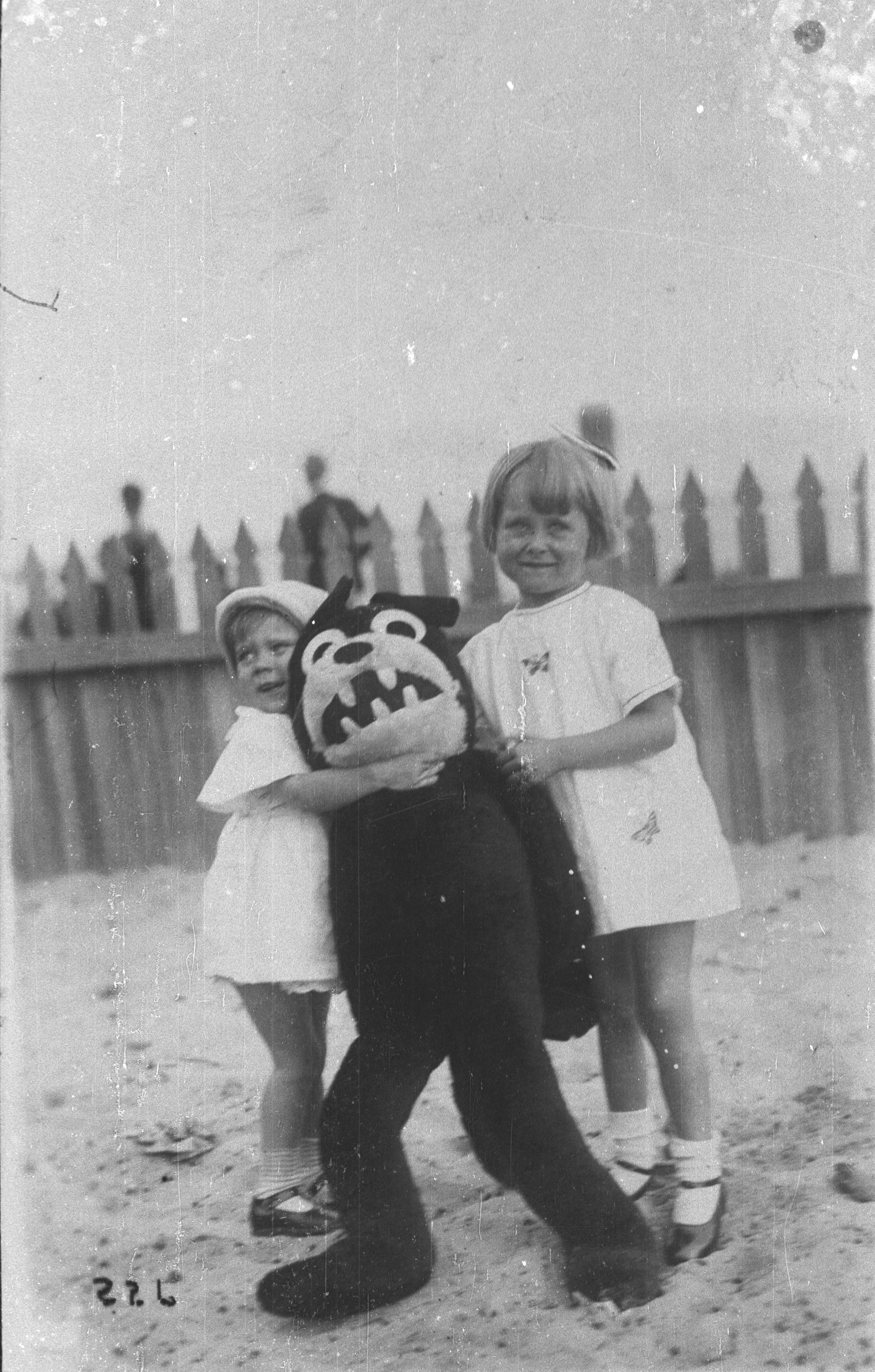
Children with Felix the Cat toy, Nielsen Park Beach, Sydney, NSW, 1926

In June 1919, John Randolph Bray - who had been producing a variety of animated and live-action short subjects in the Paramount-Bray Picturgraph screen magazine since 1915 - ended his distribution deal with Paramount Pictures in favor of more lucrative deal with Samuel Goldwyn. Paramount responded by rebranding the Picturgraph as the Paramount Screen Magazine, and hired animators Earl Hurd and Frank Moser to produce new cartoons for the program. Hurd began falling behind schedule, so he reached out to Pat Sullivan and asked if he could supply a cartoon for the magazine. The result was the cartoon Feline Follies – released on November 9, 1919 – which featured the character of "Master Tom", who would later be known as Felix the Cat.

It is disputed whether this short and the character of Felix the Cat were created by Pat Sullivan or Otto Messmer. During the height of Felix's popularity and until his death in 1933, Sullivan claimed sole credit for the character's creation. Beginning in May 1924, while on a six-week tour of England, Sullivan gave the first account of Felix's origin that he would frequently repeat:

"I have earned all the cash for the Felix idea, but my wife has the credit. She came into my room one day carrying a stray cat – just an ordinary, black garden, music-making, narrow-tailed, un-pedigreed sort of cat. 'Everybody cartoons men. Why not create an animal cartoon?' That was how Felix began."

On other occasions, he claimed that Felix had been inspired by Rudyard Kipling's The Cat that Walked by Himself. As Australian cartoonist, and Sullivan's friend, Kerwin Maegraith told The Sydney Mail in 1936, Sullivan decided to name the character Felix after Australia Felix: a term from Australian history and a title of a a popular 1917 novel by Henry Handel Richardson. Maegraith also stated that Sullivan decided to make Felix a black cat, after West-Indian-born black Australian boxer Peter Felix - who as Sullivan claimed: "...used to frighten us kids in Sydney." Australian writer Hugh McCrae claimed he shared an apartment with Pat Sullivan just before Felix was created. As a 1953 article in the Sydney Morning Herald wrote: "It comes properly as a postscript that in New York McCrae shared a flat with Pat Sullivan, the famed creator of 'Felix, the Cat'. When a film about Felix was being planned, Sullivan suggested that McCrae should do the drawings while he (Sullivan) supplied the ideas. McCrae refused and has regretted it ever since."

Beginning in 1967, Messmer claimed he had created the short Feline Follies almost entirely by himself. As he remembered, Sullivan almost turned down Hurd's offer since he was busy, but ultimately agreed, and told Messmer: "If you want to do it on the side, you can do any little thing to satisfy them." Messmer then animated the film by himself on nights and weekends in his home in New Jersey. To save himself time, he decided to make a film about a little black cat.

Like Sullivan, Messmer also claimed to have been inspired by Kipling's The Cat Who Walked by Himself. Messmer also stated he was influenced by Charlie Chaplin, whose pantomime action Messmer had studied when creating Sullivan's Chaplin series. As Messmer recalled: "...that rubbed off and we used a lot of that kind of action in Felix. We thought a funny walk sometimes would get a laugh without [a] script idea. Or wiggling of the tail, things of that type... Chaplin had a great influence on us."

Some historians have suggested that Felix's design - particularly his black body - evolved from blackface minstrel shows. While Messmer never outright stated this, instead saying he simply made Felix a black cat "...because it saves making a lot of outlines, and solid black moves better." However when discussing work on Sullivan's previous Sammy Johnsin series, he did acknowledge similarities between him and Felix:

"Pat Sullivan... started off on his own, doing his little Negro Pickaninny [Sammy Johnsin]. Which later on became almost Felix, at least in my mind anyway. Same kind of a [thing], only he was a pickaninny. Now that was going along pretty good, but it didn't through the South, that little anti-Negro feeling. They wouldn't run the Pickaninnies."

As animation historian Donald Crafton writes:

"Felix's blackness, obviously a response to the exigencies of mass production, is also a vestige of barely articulated racial stereotyping... According to the accepted, humorously intended racism of the time, black children were portrayed as witty, wide-eyed naifs who experienced feats of the imagination, presumably denied white children... Furthermore, blacks were frequently regarded as talented extroverts and as having innate advantages over whites as entertainers. Many of these same qualities were subtly transfused into the Charleston-dancing Felix, although he was never overtly identified as a black."

Australian cartoonists and historians have disputed Messmer's claims, with Australian cartoonist Lindsay Foyle stating: "...it's the American claiming - yet again - something that was created elsewhere to be their own when there's ample evidence to suggest that they only borrowed it..." Australian cartoonist Gerald Carr noted that the comic-style effects in Feline Follies, and the lettering in the dialogue captions matches Sullivan's art-style and handwriting as opposed to Messmer's. In particular, Carr notes that towards the end of the cartoon, one of the cat's says "Alo Mum" - with the word for mother being spent the Australian-British way of 'M-U-M' as opposed to the American way of 'M-O-M'. Australian animation historians Dan and Lienors Torre, also note that some of the animation in Feline Follies at times seems to resemble Sullivan's comic strip artwork as opposed to Messmer's, and that "... there are a few sequences in Feline Follies that do appear to have been completed in rather contrasting styles, which might also point to the possibility that more than one animator was involved." While Messmer claimed to have animated the majority of the cartoon by himself at home, he also acknowledged that he eventually brought his rough animation drawings into the studio for "...a couple of girls who inked and blackened it in." Therefore it is possible Sullivan may have had some involvement with Feline Follies.

According to Judy Nelson of the State Library of New South Wales, the now-lost Sullivan-produced short called The Tail or Thomas Kat (1917) - contained a precursor to Felix, and was copyrighted in Pat Sullivan's name. However, as the owner of the studio, every film produced by the Sullivan studios (even those that weren't directed by him) were copyrighted to Pat Sullivan specifically. John Canemaker also points out that by 1917 Messmer (who had been working for the studio for over a year) was already directing many of the studio's shorts himself, while Sullivan had mainly resided himself to handling business matters. According to historian David Gerstein and film preservationist Tommy José Stathes, the earliest known existence of a black cat appearing in a Sullivan studios short is The Love Affair of Ima Knut, which predates the The Tail of Thomas Kat by one week and was directed by Messmer.

Dan and Lienors Torres also note that a Black cat character appeared in Sullivan's Chaplin cartoons that debuted when Messmer was away serving in World War I, and an add in Motion Picture World (most likely drawn by Sullivan) for the first entry in the series - How Charlie Captured the Kaiser (released on September 2, 1918) - features a black cat reminiscent of the one in Feline Follies. However, as historian Kevin Scott Collier points out, production of the Chaplin series of cartoons had begun in Spring 1917 under Messmer's direction, which was interrupted by Sullivan's arrest and incarceration. (Note: According to Collier, Messmer and his crew originally planned an elaborate 40-minute animated feature film about The Tramp battling the Kaiser. However after Sullivan's release from prison, he felt the project was too risky and decided to split the feature into four separate one-reel shorts with a continuing storyline. These shorts were: How Charlie Chaplin Captured the Kaiser (Sep 2, 1918), Over the Rhine with Charlie (Dec 21, 1918), Charlie in Turkey (Jan 29, 1919) and Charlie Treats 'Em Rough (Mar 2, 1919).) Prior to this Messmer, and his team had already completed roughly 17-20 minutes on the Chaplin project - including all of How Charlie Captured the Kaiser. (Note: According to Collier, Sullivan told Motion Picture News on July 6, 1918 that he had over 8,500 "completed drawings" on the Chaplin feature. According to John Canemaker it took approximately 2,500 to 3,000 drawings to complete a 6-minute Felix the Cat cartoon. Therefore it can be deduced that Messmer and had completed roughly 17-20 minutes of the film - including all of How Charlie Chaplin Captured the Kaiser and most (if not all) of Over the Rhine with Charlie.) The Torres also note that the cartoon Charley on the Farm contains a few gags similar to some of the ones in Feline Follies, stating: "... if nothing else, does point to the fact that the studio was very prone to recycle gags and characters from film to film."

Aside from a few female inkers and 'blackeners' (including Sullivan's wife Marjorie) – Sullivan and Messmer were the only people present at the studio during the production of Feline Follies. However all of the studio's subsequent employees attributed Felix's creation to Messmer, and none spoke in defence of Sullivan.

Hal Walker, who was hired as Messmer's assistant in early-1920 (several months after the release of Feline Follies), later said "Otto was the brains of Felix the Cat..." Walker described the soft-spoken Messmer as: "...[a] leader, not a boss. He was my hero. And always defensive of Pat, the alcoholic." In contrast, Walker remembered Sullivan as being "usually ossified" with one of his regular unofficial duties being to escort Sullivan from the saloon in the lobby of the building where the studio was located, upstairs and lay him on a couch. Al Eugster - who at age 16 started as a 'blackener' at the Sullivan Studio on April 1, 1925 - described Messmer as "Mr. Felix the Cat, himself. Synonymous with Felix." Whereas Eugster claimed he barely saw Sullivan during his time at the studio, who would only occasionally come in and go into his private office. Clyde "Gerry" Geronimi concured with Eugster, saying: "We saw Sully, but not too often. He was a heavy drinker and never took an active part in production. Otto Messmer actually ran the studio."

Outside of Australia, animation historians unanimously agree Messmer was the true creator of Felix the Cat: among them are Michael Barrier, Jerry Beck, John Canemaker, Donald Crafton, David Gerstein, Milt Gray, Mark Kausler, Leonard Maltin, and Charles Solomon.

During the height of Felix's popularity in the 1920s, neither Messmer nor any of the studio's other animators received any media publicity or screen credit on any of the Felix cartoons – which was exclusively reserved for Sullivan. As Messmer remembered: "Very few people in those days got credit. Most people in the industry knew that I was running the studio for him. But the public, all they got was 'by [Pat] Sullivan'." In contrast to the numerous interviews Sullivan gave to the press about Felix throughout the decade, Messmer's name only appeared once in a 1925 article, where he was merely listed as a "production manager."

While Messmer admitted he was occasionally "a little bit" frustrated for not receiving credit for his work, he also stated: "But, you see, it was kind of a contented feeling that what we're doing is going [well]: it's a nice feeling. A feeling of security." Messmer ultimately claimed he had no resentment for not receiving credit for Felix's creation and his films at the time: "He [Sullivan] was the boss, the businessman; I was the foreman; the employee."

=== Popularity and distribution ===
Feline Follies was originally intended to be a mere one-shot cartoon, with the short ending with the character "Master Tom" committing suicide by inhaling coal gas from a pump. However, as Messmer recalled, the short was well received by audiences, and Paramount: "...ordered another one, and another one..." Eventually, Paramount executive John King - the head of the Screen Magazine – commissioned an entire series with the character. After the second appearance of "Master Tom" in Musical Mews (released on November 16, 1919), he was finally given the name Felix in the character's third appearance, The Adventures of Felix (released on December 14, 1919). Messmer credited King with coming up with the name Felix - a combination of the words "feline" and "felicity".

Paramount Pictures distributed the earliest films from 1919 to 1921. Margaret J. Winkler's Winkler Pictures distributed the shorts from 1922 to 1925, the year when Educational Pictures took over the distribution of the shorts. Sullivan promised them one new Felix short every two weeks. The combination of solid animation, skillful promotion, and widespread distribution brought Felix's popularity to new heights.

Felix's great success also spawned a host of imitators. The appearances and personalities of other 1920s feline stars such as Julius of Walt Disney's Alice Comedies, Waffles of Paul Terry's Aesop's Film Fables, and especially Bill Nolan's 1925 adaptation of Krazy Kat (distributed by the eschewed Winkler) all seem to have been directly patterned after Felix. This influence also extended outside the United States, serving as inspiration for Suihō Tagawa in the creation of his character Norakuro, a dog with black fur.

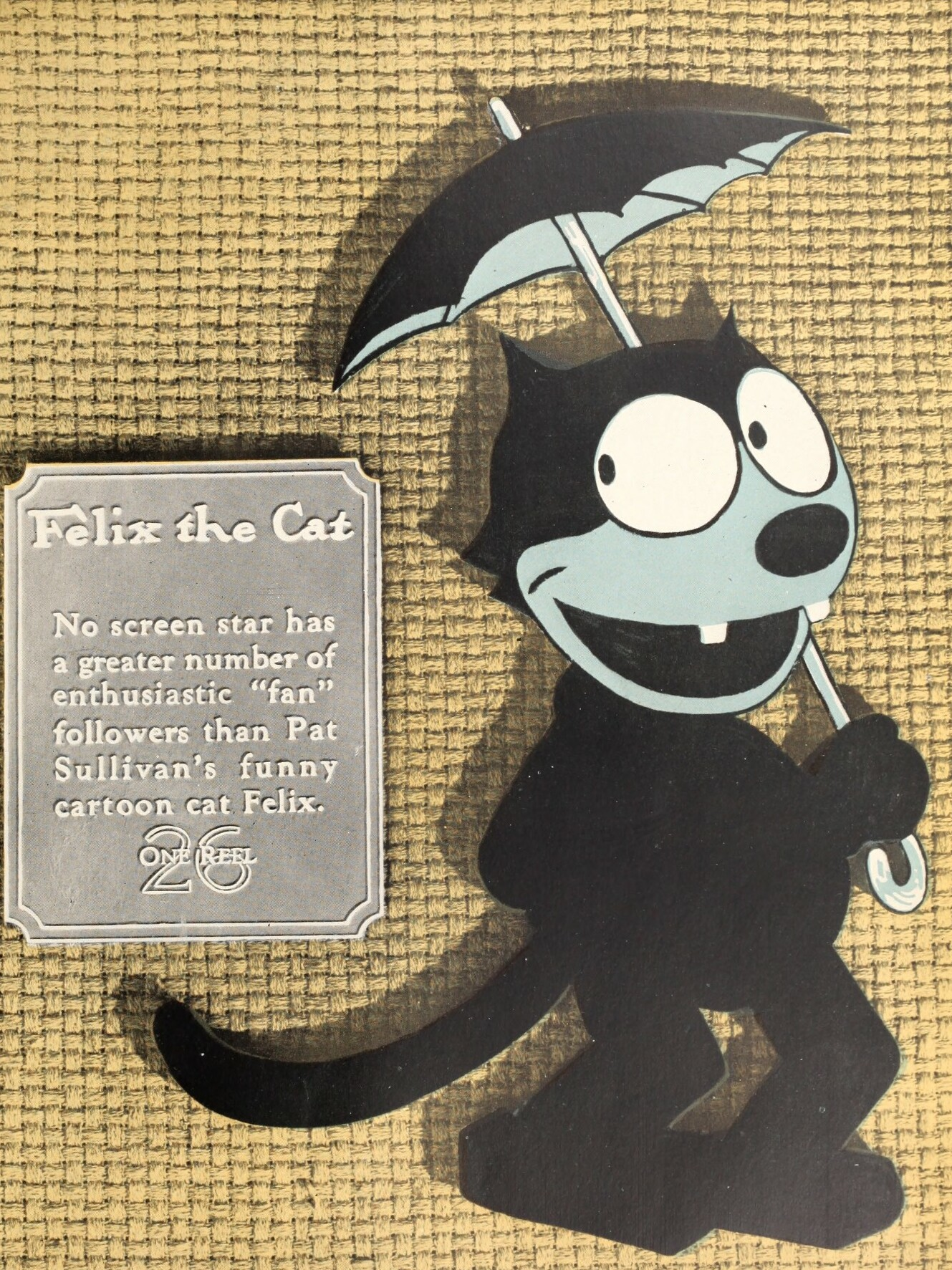
Educational Pictures advertisement from 1926 Motion Picture News.

Felix's cartoons were also popular among critics. They have been cited as imaginative examples of surrealism in filmmaking. Felix has been said to represent a child's sense of wonder, creating the fantastic when it is not there, and taking it in stride when it is. His famous pace—hands behind his back, head down, deep in thought—became a trademark that has been analyzed by critics around the world. Felix's expressive tail, which could be a shovel one moment, an exclamation mark or pencil the next, serves to emphasize that anything can happen in his world. Aldous Huxley wrote that the Felix shorts proved that "[w]hat the cinema can do better than literature or the spoken drama is to be fantastic".

By 1923, the character was at the peak of his film career. Felix in Hollywood, a short released during that year, plays upon Felix's popularity, as he becomes acquainted with such fellow celebrities as Douglas Fairbanks, Cecil B. DeMille, Charlie Chaplin, Ben Turpin, and even censor Will H. Hays. His image could be seen on clocks (not to be confused with the Kit-Cat Klock) and Christmas ornaments. Felix also became the subject of several popular songs of the day, such as "Felix Kept On Walking" by Paul Whiteman. Sullivan made an estimated $100,000 a year from toy licensing alone. With the character's success also emerged a handful of new costars. These included Felix's master Willie Jones, a mouse named Skiddoo, Felix's nephews Inky, Dinky, and Winky, and his girlfriend Kitty. Felix the Cat sheet music, with music by Pete Wendling and Max Kortlander and featuring lyrics by Alfred Bryan, was published in 1928 by Sam Fox Publishing Company. The cover art of Felix playing a banjo was done by Otto Messmer.

In 1924, animator Bill Nolan redesigned the character, making him both rounder and "cuter". Felix's new looks, coupled with Messmer's character animation, brought Felix to a higher profile.

Sullivan marketed the cat relentlessly while Messmer continued to produce a prodigious volume of Felix cartoons. Messmer did the animation on white paper with inkers tracing the drawings directly. The animators drew backgrounds onto pieces of celluloid, which were then laid atop the drawings to be photographed. Any perspective work had to be animated by hand, as the studio cameras were unable to perform pans or trucks.

Most of the early Felix cartoons mirrored American attitudes of the "Roaring Twenties". Ethnic stereotypes appeared in such shorts as Felix Goes Hungry (1924). Recent events such as the Russian Civil War were depicted in shorts like Felix All Puzzled (1924). Flappers were caricatured in Felix Strikes It Rich (1923). He also became involved in union organizing with Felix Revolts (also 1923). In some shorts, Felix even performed a rendition of the Charleston. References to alcoholism and Prohibition were also commonplace in many of the Felix shorts, particularly Felix Finds Out (1924), Whys and Other Whys (1927), and Felix Woos Whoopee (1930), to name a few. In Felix Dopes It Out (1924), Felix tries to help a suicidal man who is plagued with a red nose. By the end of the short, the cat finds the cure for the condition: "Keep drinking, and it'll turn blue".

In 1928, Educational ceased releasing the Felix cartoons, and several were reissued by First National Pictures. Copley Pictures distributed them from 1929 to 1930. There was a brief three-cartoon resurrection in 1936 by the Van Beuren Studios (The Goose That Laid the Golden Egg, Neptune Nonsense, and Bold King Cole), which are all directed by Disney alumni Burt Gillett, who was suffering from bipolar disorder at the time. Sullivan did most of the marketing for the character in the 1920s. In these Van Beuren shorts, Felix spoke and sang in a high-pitched, childlike voice provided by then-21-year-old Walter Tetley, who was a popular radio actor from the 1930s to the 1950s (Julius on The Phil Harris-Alice Faye Show, and Leroy on The Great Gildersleeve), but later best known in the 1960s as the voice of Sherman on The Rocky and Bullwinkle Show's Mister Peabody segments.

==== Felix as mascot and pop culture icon ====
The U.S. Navy insignia for the VF-31 squadron from 1948.

Given the character's unprecedented popularity and the fact that his name was partially derived from the Latin word for "happy", some rather notable individuals and organizations adopted Felix as a mascot. The first of these was a Los Angeles Chevrolet dealer and friend of Pat Sullivan named Winslow B. Felix, who first opened his showroom in 1921. The three-sided neon sign of Felix Chevrolet, with its giant, smiling images of the character, is today one of LA's better-known landmarks, standing watch over both Figueroa Street and the Harbor Freeway. Others who adopted Felix included the 1922 New York Yankees and pilot and actress Ruth Elder, who took a Felix doll with her in an attempt to become the first woman to duplicate Charles Lindbergh's transatlantic crossing to Paris.

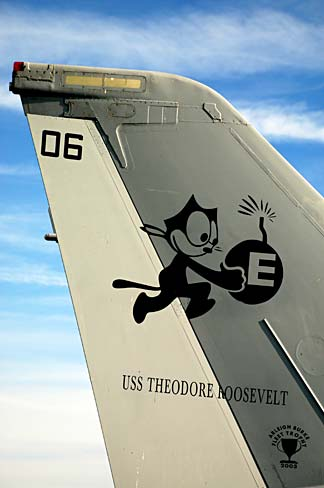
Felix on the tail of an F-14 Tomcat of VF-31, now at the Evergreen Aviation Museum.

This popularity persisted. In the late 1920s, the U.S. Navy's Bombing Squadron Two (VB-2B) adopted a unit insignia consisting of Felix happily carrying a bomb with a burning fuse. They retained the insignia through the 1930s, when they became a fighter squadron under the designations VF-6B and, later, VF-3, whose members Edward O'Hare and John Thach became famous naval aviators in World War II. After the war, a U.S. Navy fighter squadron currently designated VFA-31 replaced its winged meat-cleaver logo with the same insignia after the original Felix squadron had been disbanded. The carrier-based night-fighter squadron, nicknamed the "Tomcatters", remained active under various designations continuing to the present day, and Felix still appears on both the squadron's cloth jacket patches and aircraft, carrying his bomb with its fuse burning.

Felix's iconic walk was acknowledged in stage acts and song. "Felix keeps on walking" was briefly a minor catchphrase of the 1920s, inspired by Felix's iconic pacing in circles, head down, hand behind his back, when pondering some situation, as seen in his cartoons (and on the cover of the song's sheet music). The 1923 song "Felix Kept On Walking" became popular in London music halls. Other songs included "Here He Is Again! (Being More Adventures Of Felix)" and "Fido Followed Felix", both in reference to the cat's adventures.

Felix is also the oldest high school mascot in the state of Indiana, chosen in 1926 after a Logansport High School player brought his plush Felix to a basketball game. When the team came from behind and won that night, Felix became the mascot of all the Logansport High School sports teams.

When television was in the experimental stages in 1928, the very first image to ever be seen was a toy Felix the Cat mounted to a revolving phonograph turntable. It remained on screen for hours while engineers used it as a test pattern.

Over a century after his debut on screen in 1919, he still makes occasional appearances in pop culture. In 1972, while Stephen Bissette was getting tickets to Fritz the Cat, a mother and her two children confused Fritz with Felix, but the ticket venue employee wouldn't sell the tickets to the confused mother. Also, in a news article featuring a screening called "Homage to Otto Messmer" in 1984, the news article erroneously refers to the films as "early Fritz the Cat classics". Felix was planned to make a cameo in the 1988 film Who Framed Roger Rabbit in a sequence set at Marvin Acme's funeral, which was cut for pacing reasons at the storyboard stage. In the final film, his face appears as the comedy and tragedy masks above the entrance of the tunnel that leads to Toontown. The pop punk band The Queers also use Felix as a mascot, often drawn to reflect punk sensibilities and attributes such as scowling, smoking, or playing the guitar. Felix adorns the covers of both the Surf Goddess EP and the Move Back Home album. Felix also appears in the music video for the single "Don't Back Down". Besides appearing on the covers and liner notes of various albums, the iconic cat also appears in merchandise such as T-shirts and buttons. In an interview with bassist B-Face, he asserts that Lookout! Records is responsible for the use of Felix as a mascot. He also appeared as a giant puppet at the 2015 Treefort Music Fest.

For Felix the Cat's 100th anniversary, Universal Pictures dubbed November 9 "Felix the Cat Day" and released new merchandise, including a Pop! figure, Skechers brand shoes, clocks, a PEZ dispenser, shirts, bags, pillows, and pomade. Also for the anniversary, the National Film and Sound Archive of Australia (NFSA) released an article detailing Felix the Cat's history with frames and clips from early animations.

==== Comics ====
Felix the Cat
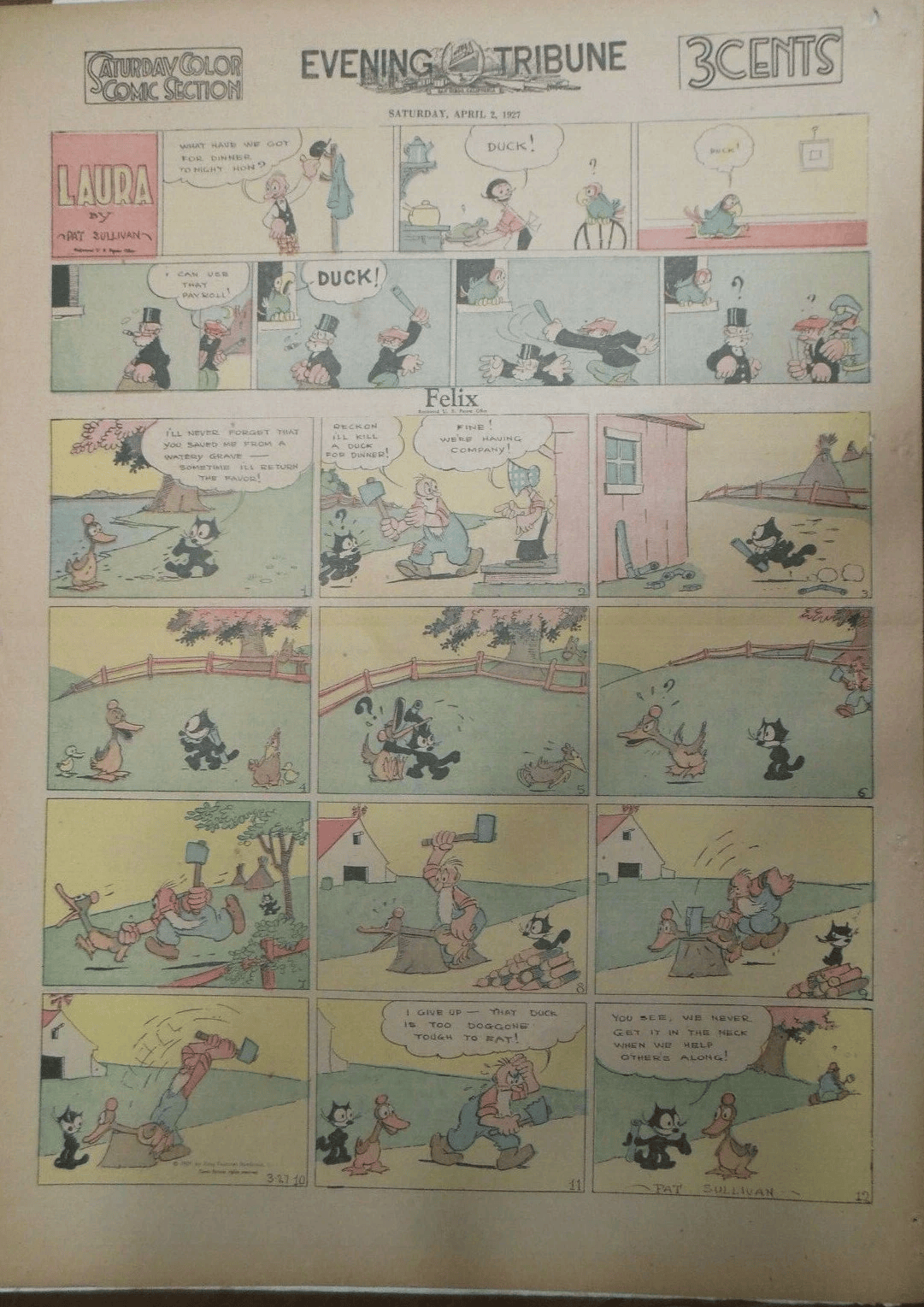
- Felix the Cat comic strip by Otto Messmer, dated April 2, 1927.
- Author(s): Pat Sullivan; Otto Messmer (1927–1954); Jack Mendelsohn (1948–1952); Joe Oriolo (1955–1966)
- Current status/schedule: Daily and Sunday; concluded
- Launch date: August 19, 1923; 103 years ago
- End date: 1966; 60 years ago
- Syndicate: King Features Syndicate
- Publisher: Dell Comics
- Genre: Humor

Pat Sullivan began a syndicated comic strip on August 19, 1923, distributed by King Features Syndicate. In 1927 Messmer took over drawing duties of the strip. (The first The Felix Annual from 1924 issued in Great Britain shows the last two stories are not the usual Otto Messmer style, so a difference in Pat Sullivan-drawn cartoons can be noted.)

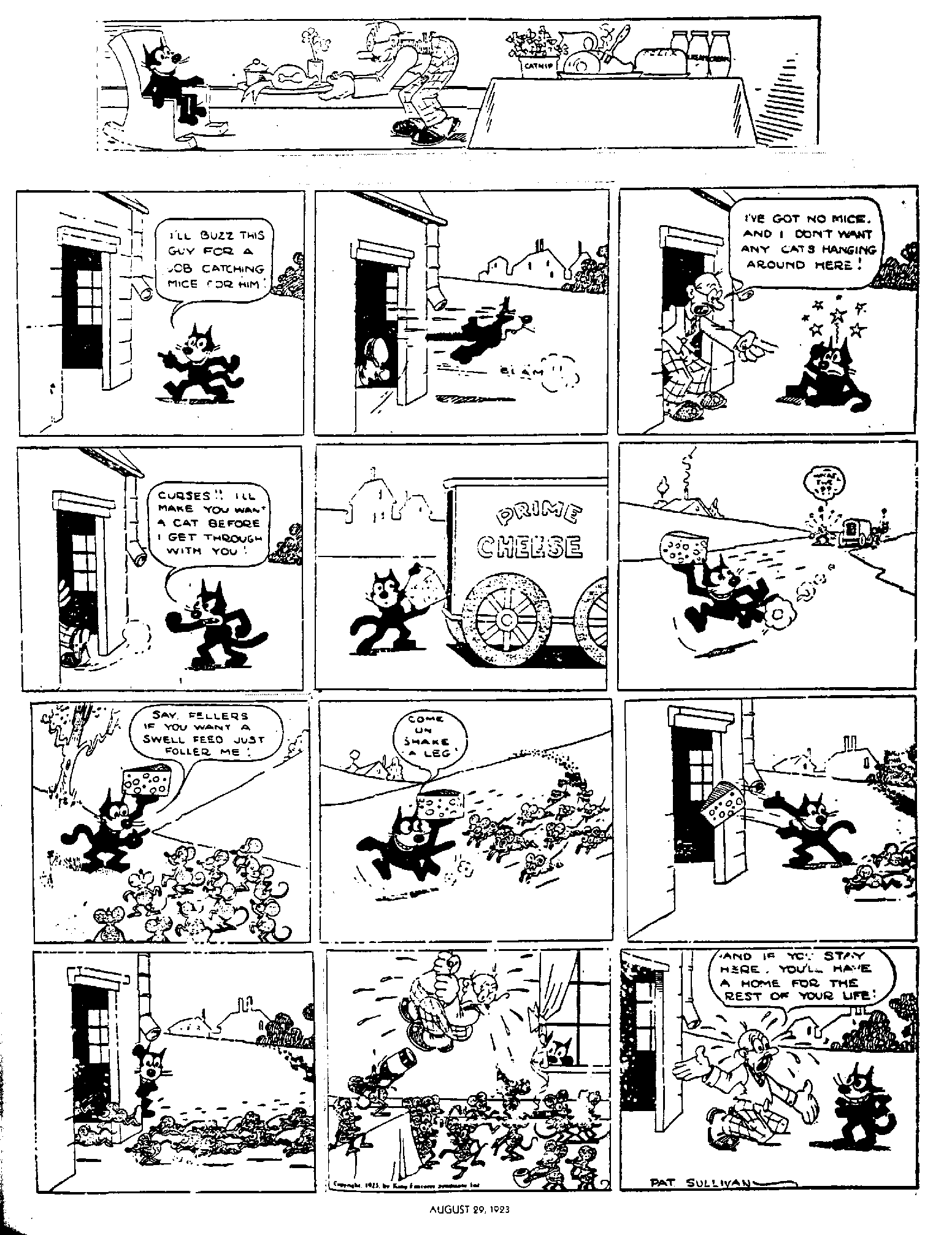
The first Felix the Cat comic from August 29, 1923

Messmer himself pursued the Sunday Felix comic strips until their discontinuance in 1943, when he began eleven years of writing and drawing Felix comic books for Dell Comics that were released every other month. Jack Mendelsohn was the ghostwriter of the Felix strip from 1948 to 1952. In 1954, Messmer retired from the Felix daily newspaper strips, and his assistant Joe Oriolo (the creator of Casper the Friendly Ghost) took over. The strip concluded in 1966.

Felix co-starred with Betty Boop in the Betty Boop and Felix comic strip (1984–1988).

After 35 years of not being in any comics, Source Point Press announced that Felix the Cat would get a new comic book series, with the permission by DreamWorks Animation to use the character, following a decade of owning the character and using him as a fashion brand. The comic is written by Mark Federali, illustrated by Tracy Yardley, and was due to be released sometime in 2022. Yardley later said in February 2022 that production has been delayed and Source Point Press is no longer publishing the books. Later in September, Yardley said that the comic was not cancelled, and that it would be published by Rocketship Entertainment. A month later, Rocketship announced that artists and writers, inciuding Mike Federali, would be attending New York Comic Con. Federali signed copies of the comic. On November 15, Rocketship announced through its new imprint Bottlerocket, that the comic would release in the spring of 2023, but the release dated switched to Fall of 2023, to which it was released on November 7, 2023.

=== From silent to sound ===
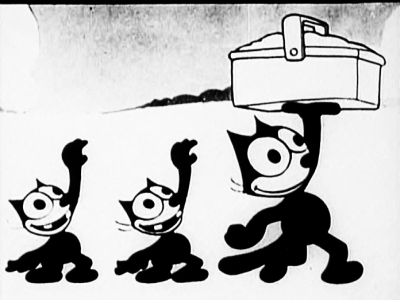
Felix, Inky and Winky in April Maze (1930)

With the advent of synchronized sound in The Jazz Singer in 1927, Educational Pictures, who distributed the Felix shorts at the time, urged Pat Sullivan to make the leap to "talkie" cartoons, but Sullivan refused. Further disputes led to a break between Educational and Sullivan. Only after competing studios released the first synchronized-sound animated films, such as Fleischer's My Old Kentucky Home, Van Beuren's Dinner Time and Disney's Steamboat Willie, did Sullivan see the possibilities of sound. He managed to secure a contract with First National Pictures in 1928, but for reasons unknown, this did not last, so Sullivan sought out Jacques Kopfstein and Copley Pictures to distribute his new sound Felix cartoons. On October 16, 1929, an advertisement appeared in Film Daily with Felix announcing, Jolson-like, "You ain't heard nothin' yet!"

Felix's transition to sound was not a smooth one. Sullivan did not carefully prepare for Felix's transition to sound and added sound effects into the sound cartoons as a post-animation process. As a result, the popularity of the shorts quickly began to fade. More than ever, it seemed as though Disney's mouse was drawing audiences away from Sullivan's silent star. Not even entries such as the Fleischer-style off-beat Woos Whoopee or the Silly Symphony-esque April Maze (both 1930) could regain the franchise's audience. Kopfstein finally canceled Sullivan's contract. Subsequently, he announced plans to start a new studio in California, but such ideas never materialized. Things went from bad to worse when Sullivan's wife, Marjorie, died in March 1932. After this, Sullivan completely fell apart. He slumped into an alcoholic depression, his health rapidly declined, and his memory began to fade. He could not even cash checks to Messmer because his signature was reduced to a mere scribble. He died in 1933. After Sullivan's death in 1933, his estate in Australia took ownership of the character; although Messmer told Harry Kopp that Sullivan promised him the rights to Felix in his will, no such will existed by the time he died. Kopp and the estate got the rights in 1934 from King Features Syndicate after numerous conferences with him. Messmer recalled: "He left everything a mess, no books, no nothing. So when he died the place had to close down, at the height of popularity, when everybody, RKO and all of them, for years they tried to get hold of Felix... I didn't have that permission [to continue the character] 'cause I didn't have legal ownership of it".

In 1935, Amadee J. Van Beuren of the Van Beuren Studios called Messmer and asked him if he could return Felix to the screen. Van Beuren even stated that Messmer would be provided with a full staff and all of the necessary utilities, but Messmer declined his offer and instead recommended Burt Gillett, a former Sullivan staffer who was now heading the Van Beuren staff. In 1936, Van Beuren obtained approval from Sullivan's brother to license Felix to his studio with the intention of producing new shorts both in color and with sound. With Gillett at the helm, now with a heavy Disney influence, he did away with Felix's established personality, rendering him a stock talking animal character of the type popular in the day. The new shorts were unsuccessful, and after only three outings Van Beuren discontinued the series, leaving a fourth in the storyboard stages.

=== Revival ===
In 1953, Official Films purchased the Sullivan–Messmer shorts, added soundtracks to them, and distributed them to home movie and television markets.

Otto Messmer's assistant Joe Oriolo, who had taken over the Felix comic strip, struck a deal with Felix's new owner, Pat Sullivan's nephew, to begin a new series of Felix cartoons on television. Oriolo went on to star Felix in 260 television cartoons produced by Famous Studios which was renamed to Paramount Cartoon Studios, and distributed by Trans-Lux beginning in 1958. Like the Van Beuren studio before, Oriolo gave Felix a more domesticated and pedestrian personality geared more toward children and introduced now-familiar elements such as Felix's Magic Bag of Tricks, a satchel that could assume the shape and characteristics of anything Felix wanted. The show did away with Felix's previous supporting cast and introduced many new characters, all of which were performed by voice actor Jack Mercer.

Oriolo's plots revolve around the unsuccessful attempts of the antagonists to steal Felix's Magic Bag, though in an unusual twist, these antagonists are occasionally depicted as Felix's friends as well. The cartoons proved popular, but critics have dismissed them as paling in comparison to the earlier Sullivan–Messmer works, especially since Oriolo aimed the cartoons at children. Limited animation (required due to budgetary restraints) and simplistic storylines did nothing to diminish the series' popularity.

In 1970, Oriolo gained complete control of the Felix character and Don Oriolo continued to promote the character, even though the rights had devolved to DreamWorks Animation.

In 1975–1977 and 1982, Oriolo and Bert Hecht presented a live-action series called Felix the Cat Live, aired by the television network CBS, and which was later released on DVD in 2014.

In the late 1980s, after his father's death, Don Oriolo teamed up with European animators to work on the character's first feature film, Felix the Cat: The Movie. In the film, Felix visits an alternate reality along with the Professor and Poindexter. New World Pictures planned a 1987 Thanksgiving release for U.S. theaters, which did not happen; the movie went direct-to-video in August 1991, which was widely panned upon its release before being completely abandoned in the US during the 21st century. In 1994, Felix appeared on television again, to replace the popular Fido Dido bumpers on CBS, and then one year later in the series The Twisted Tales of Felix the Cat. Baby Felix followed in 2000 for the Japanese market, and also the direct-to-video Felix the Cat Saves Christmas released in 2004. Oriolo also brought about a new wave of Felix merchandising, including Wendy's Kids Meal toys and a video game for the Nintendo Entertainment System.

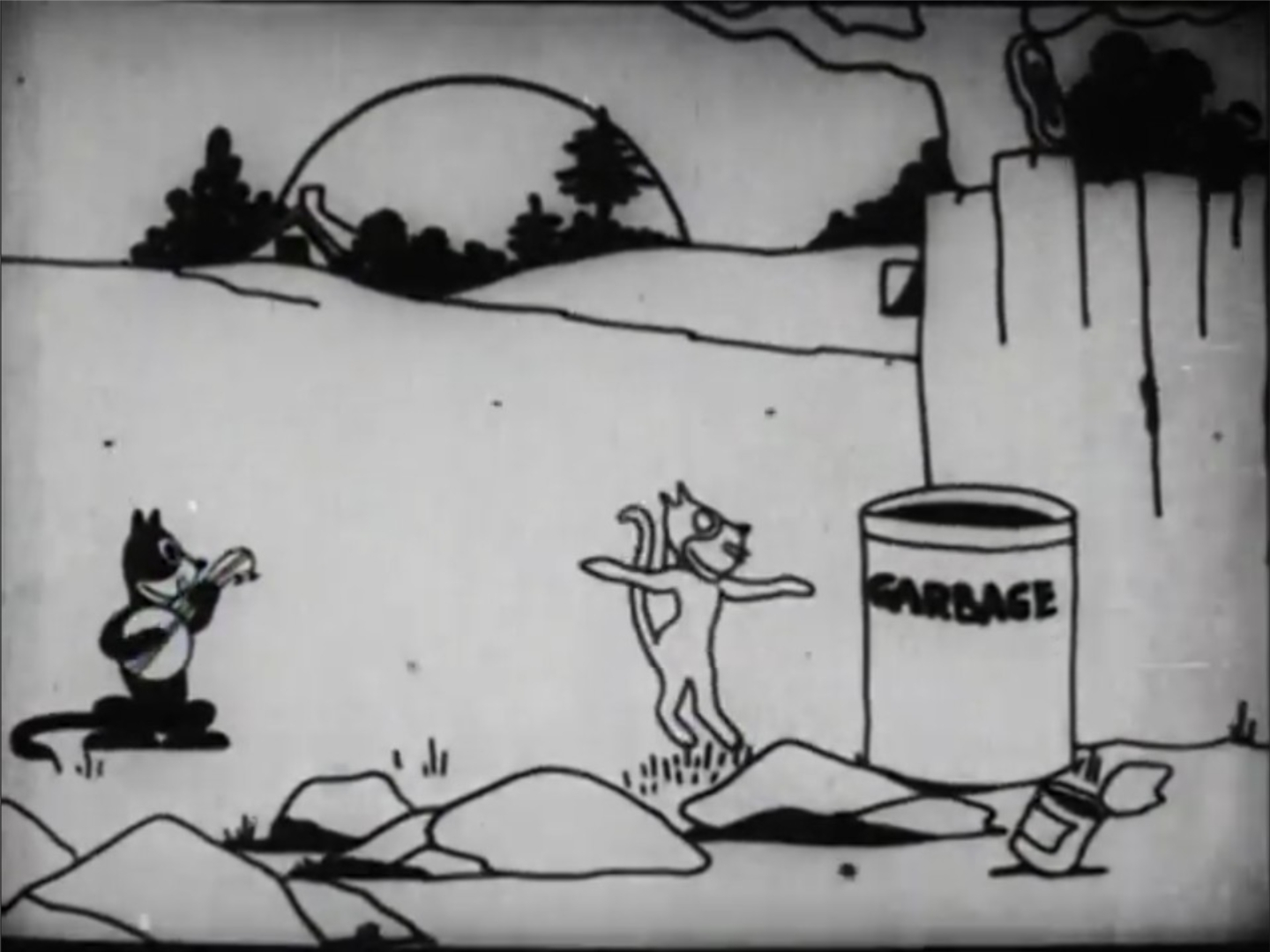
A Felix prototype in Feline Follies (1919)

Felix was voted in 2004 among the 100 Greatest Cartoons in a poll conducted by the British television channel Channel 4, ranking at No. 89.

According to Don Oriolo's Felix the Cat blog, as of September 2008 there were plans in development for a new television series. Oriolo's biography page also mentioned a 52-episode cartoon series then-in the works titled Felix the Cat, which was slated to use computer graphics. The series was to be produced by TeamTO, in association with Forecast Pictures and Felix the Cat Productions. In 2009-2010, a 13-episode puppet series named Felix the Cat, Uncle Floyd and Flexitoon (formerly Felix and Pals Puppet Party!) was produced by Don Oriolo and Craig Marin at Flexitoon, set to be hosted by and star Floyd Vivino and Michael Townsend Wright. A test pilot was shot by David Burd in May 2016. Another series was in development in 2011, titled Felix the Cat and the New Adventures and produced by Lorenzo Vecce at Bottega Animation and Sarah De Cristofaro, Angelo Merlo and Francesco Aggogeri at Mach4Lab. A third series was pitched by Tremblay Bros. Studios in the late 2010s, but was rejected. Oriolo has not produced or directed any cartoons or feature films featuring Felix the Cat since the mid-2000s.

== Home video ==
DVD releases include Presenting Felix the Cat from Bosko Video; Felix! from Lumivision; Felix the Cat: The Collector's Edition from Delta Entertainment; and Before Walt from Inkwell Images Ink. Some of the TV series cartoons (from 1958 to 1959) were released on DVD by Classic Media. Some of the 1990s series has also been released.

== See also ==
- Animation in the United States during the silent era
- Baby Felix
- Golden age of American animation
- Kit-Cat Klock
- Winsor McCay
