= Betty Boop and Felix =

American comic strip by the Walker brothers

- The Walker Brothers' Betty Boop and Felix (January 13, 1985)
- Author(s): The Walker Brothers
- Current status/schedule: Daily and Sunday; concluded
- Launch date: November 19, 1984; 40 years ago
- End date: January 31, 1988; 37 years ago
- Syndicate(s): King Features Syndicate
- Genre(s): Humor, Talking Animal

Betty Boop and Felix is a newspaper comic strip starring Betty Boop and Felix the Cat, which ran from November 19, 1984, to January 31, 1988. It was written by Mort Walker's sons Brian, Morgan, Greg and Neal, who signed their work as "The Walker Brothers".

Debuting at the height of Garfield's popularity, this King Features Syndicate strip showed Betty Boop as a working woman and Felix as her pet (replacing Pudgy as Betty's pet). Unlike most other incarnations of the famous cat, Felix never spoke in this strip; his ideas and opinions are conveyed to the reader in thought balloons. Also, Felix's squash and stretch abilities and magic bag are absent, and Betty's sex appeal is downplayed.
