= Kit-Cat Klock =

Art deco novelty wall clock

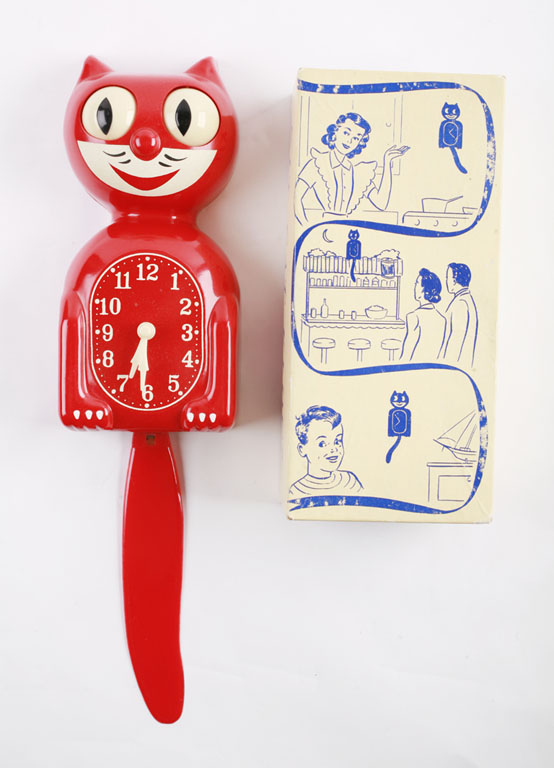
- An original model clock with packaging from the 1940s
- Designer: Earl Arnault
- Made in: United States
- Style / tradition: Art Deco
- Sold by: California Clock Company

The Kit-Cat Klock is an Art Deco novelty wall clock shaped like a grinning cat with cartoon eyes that swivel in time with its pendulum tail. It is traditionally black, but models in other colors and styles are also available. It is a common symbol of kitchens in North American popular culture.

== History ==
The first clock was an idea by Earl Arnault (1904–1971). It was created and physically prototyped by Clifford Stone (1908–1986) in 1932 and manufactured by the Allied Manufacturing Company, which was owned by Stone, in Portland, Oregon. Allied subsequently moved to Seattle, Washington, in the early 1940s and then to southern California in 1962, whereupon it was renamed California Clock Company.

The manufacturer estimates that an average of one clock has been sold every three minutes for the last 50 years.

== Design ==
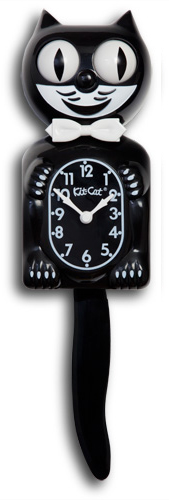
Black cat-shaped wall clock with white bow tie, moving eyes, swinging tail, and clock face with white numerals and Kit-Cat branding

The clock's design has changed little in the intervening years. The first generation, manufactured from the 1930s to the early 1950s, had two paws and no bow tie. Newer models have four paws and a bow tie.

In the 1960s, genuine crystals were added as accents to some clocks. The words "Kit-Cat" were added to the clock's face in 1982. The original clocks were AC-powered. However, due to scarcity of American-made AC motors, the clock was redesigned for battery power in the late 1980s.

== Court case ==
In 2007, Felix the Cat Productions announced that they would be suing California Clock Company, claiming they had "capitalized on [Felix the Cat's] unique facial similarities to confuse consumers". Court papers noted that Kit-Cat's manufacturers had previously referred to it online as the "Felix Clock".

In 2008, the two sides resolved the dispute amicably.

== Cultural impact ==
Kit-Cat Klocks are frequently seen in movies, commercials, TV and advertising. The California Clock Company has also made several other animated clocks, including a teddy bear, a panda, a poodle and an owl.

The name "Kit-Cat" is a trademark of California Clock Company.

== See also ==
- Black cat
