= Walt Stanchfield =

American animator

- Born: July 14, 1919; Los Angeles, California
- Died: September 3, 2000 (aged 81); Santa Barbara County, California
- Known for: Animation

Walt Stanchfield (July 14, 1919 – September 3, 2000) was an American animator, writer and teacher. Stanchfield is known for work on a series of classic animated feature films at Walt Disney Studios and his mentoring of Disney animators.

Walter Stanchfield was born in 1919 in Los Angeles, California. After graduating from high school in 1937, Stanchfield worked as an animator at the Charles Mintz Studio. During World War II, he served in the U.S. Navy. Returning to California, he briefly worked at the Walter Lantz Studio before joining Walt Disney Studios to work on the 1949 full-length animated feature The Adventures of Ichabod and Mr. Toad. His career included work on every subsequent Disney animated feature, including character animation on The Jungle Book in 1967 and The Aristocats in 1970. His final film for Disney was The Great Mouse Detective in 1986. In 1987, Stanchfield served as an animation consultant on Who Framed Roger Rabbit.

In the 1970s, Stanchfield and Eric Larson created a training program for new animators at Disney studios. The program included weekly drawing classes and lectures. Stanchfield's students included numerous prominent animators, such as Brad Bird, John Lasseter, Don Bluth, Joe Ranft, John Musker, Ron Clements, Glen Keane, Andreas Deja, and Mark Henn. Those animators would go on to craft important films of the Disney Renaissance: The Little Mermaid, Beauty and the Beast, The Nightmare Before Christmas, The Lion King, Pocahontas, and Toy Story.

In 2009, Stanchfield's lecture notes were compiled into the two-volume set Drawn to Life: 20 Golden Years of Disney Master Classes.
