= Feline Follies =

1919 animated short featuring Felix the Cat

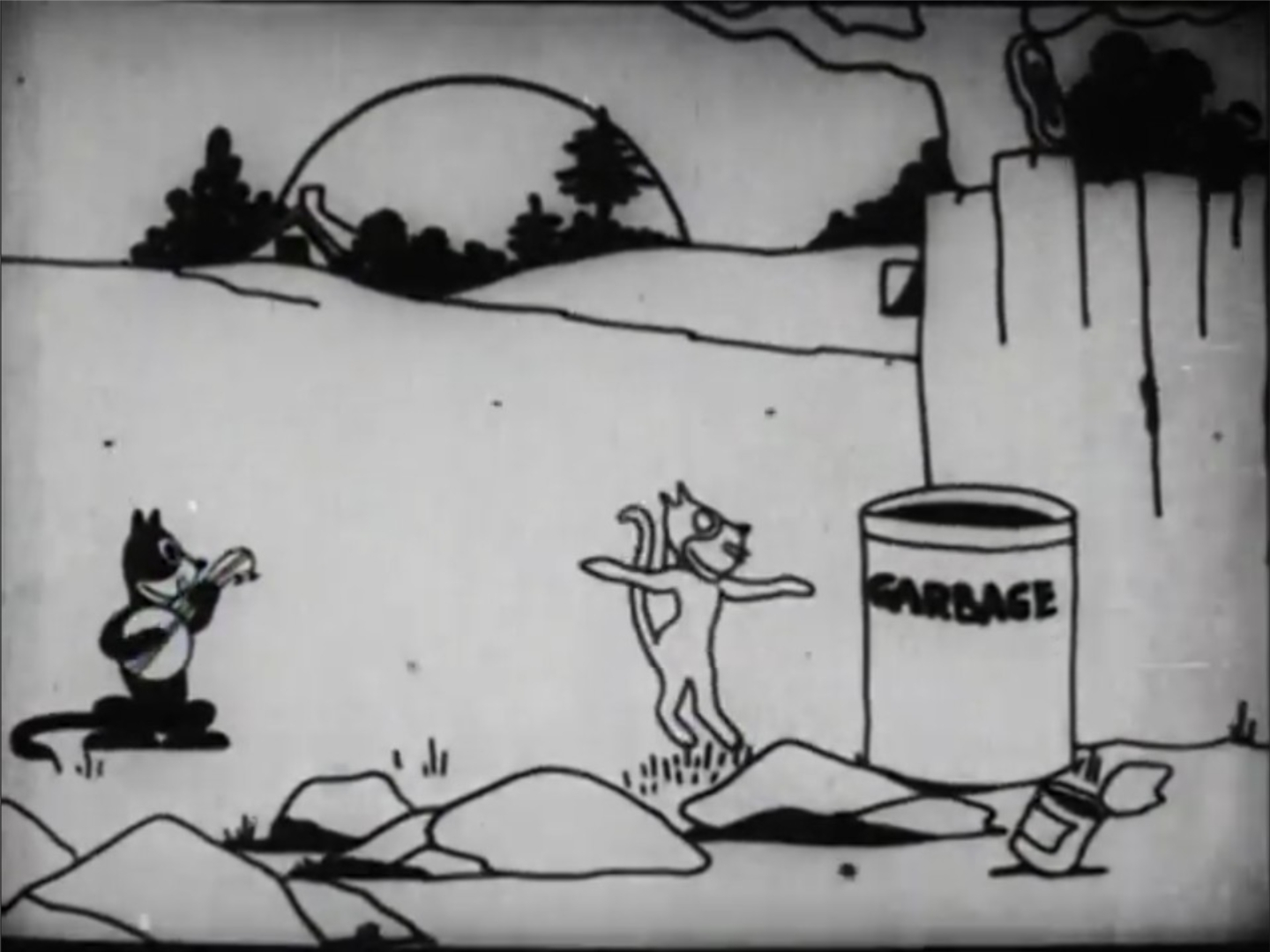
An early version of Felix the Cat (left) in Feline Follies.

Feline Follies is a 1919 animated short silent film, distributed by Paramount Pictures. It marked the first appearance of the character Felix the Cat.

== Plot ==
Feline Follies by Pat Sullivan, silent, 1919. Length 4min44s, 501 kbit/s

Felix (at this point known as "Master Tom"), a male black cat, meets a female white cat in Pussyville. He serenades his new love interest, and announces his intention to devote his nine lives to her. Felix's singing wakes up an entire neighborhood.

Later, back at home, a group of mice proceeds to eat all the food in Felix's house. When his owner arrives a little while later and sees scraps of food everywhere, she throws Felix out of the house, not knowing it was the mice who did it.

Now homeless, Felix goes to live with his love interest, only to find out she is the mother (and Felix is the father) of a large litter of kittens. In reaction, Felix runs towards the local gasworks and commits suicide by intentionally inhaling coal gas.

== Production ==
The film was produced by the Pat Sullivan Studio of New York City, owned by the Australian animator Pat Sullivan. It is a matter of dispute whether to attribute the film and Felix's creation to Sullivan himself, or to Otto Messmer, the studio's lead animator. Messmer's claim to have been the sole creator of Felix has parallels in animation history. Ub Iwerks claimed that he created Mickey Mouse, instead of studio owner Walt Disney. Grim Natwick claimed that he created Betty Boop, instead of studio owner Max Fleischer.

In 1970s interviews, Messmer claimed that the Pat Sullivan Studio was overly busy in 1919. When Paramount Pictures demanded an extra film to be produced, Pat Sullivan did not have enough time to work on it. He reportedly assigned the film's production to Messmer, who served as the film's only animator. Messmer claimed to have created the entire film within his own home, instead of the studio office.

Feline Follies was not the first short film by the Pat Sullivan Studio to feature a black cat as a protagonist. The studio's first cat-themed animated film was The Tail of Thomas Kat (1917), currently a lost film. The earlier's short protagonist was called "Thomas Kat". In Feline Follies, Felix appears under a similar alias: "Master Tom". Black cats were also a recurring element in a film series by the Pat Sullivan Studio, the Charlie or Charley series. The series was based on the screen persona of then-popular actor Charlie Chaplin. A black cat identical in design to Felix in Feline Follies had appeared in promotional materials for the animated short How Charlie Captured the Kaiser (August 1918). The cat was given its own scene in the subsequent short Charlie in the Farm (1919). The main visual gag from this scene was then re-used in Feline Follies. This suggests that Felix may have slowly evolved from these precursors, instead of first appearing in Feline Follies.

Animation historian Gerald Carr has attributed the lettering of Feline Follies to Pat Sullivan, based on similarities with Sullivan's known works. The line art and visual forms of the film were also found to be similar to Pat Sullivan's previous works on comic strips. The dialogue in Feline Follies appears in written form. A litter of kittens uses the term "Mum" for their mother, a spelling more common to Australian English and British English than American English.

Messmer also had a background in comic strips, and he reportedly had a "quite proficient" drawing style, with "well-crafted line work and very convincing volumetric forms". Sullivan's drawing style appeared "rougher" and had a "more angular execution". A number of "incongruous" design features and contrasting design styles in Feline Follies and other early Felix short films may indicate that more than one animator was involved in its production.

The serenade scene of the film was recycling a serenade scene from Charlie in the Farm. Tom's reaction to the prospect of becoming a stepfather was recycled from another scene of the same film. In Charlie in the Farm, a male bird marries. Following the marriage, he discovers that his wife has chicks from a previous relationship. The male bird runs away from his new family.

== Release ==
Feline Follies was released on November 9, 1919, as one of the films in the Paramount Screen Magazine. The initial distributor was the company Famous Players–Lasky (later known as Paramount Pictures). The distribution of the Felix series was subsequently handled by Margaret J. Winkler and by the company Educational Pictures.

== See also ==
- Felix the Cat filmography
