= Pat Sullivan (film producer) =

Australian-American animator and film producer (1885–1933)

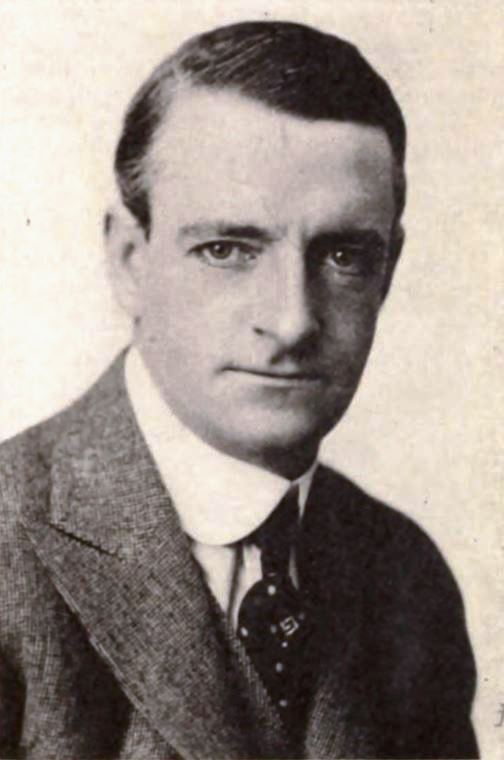
- From a 1920 magazine
- Born: Patrick Peter O'Sullivan; February 22, 1885; Paddington, New South Wales, Australia
- Died: February 15, 1933 (aged 47); New York City, United States
- Occupations: Cartoonist; animator; film producer
- Notable work: Felix the Cat
- Spouse: Marjorie Gallagher (m. 1917; died 1932)
- Relatives: William O'Sullivan (brother); Patrick O'Sullivan (nephew)

Patrick Peter O'Sullivan (February 22, 1885 – February 15, 1933) was an Australian-American cartoonist, pioneer animator and film producer, best known for producing the first Felix the Cat silent cartoons.

== Early life ==
Patrick Peter O'Sullivan was born on Ivry Street in the Paddington suburb of Sydney, Australia on February 22, 1885. (Note: According to animation historian John Canemaker birth records on Sullivan do not exist, but both his death certificate and a 1917 New York City Criminal Court statement lists 1885 as his year of birth. John Young of the Australian Dictionary of Biography - obtained private information on Sullivan – and determined 22 February as the specific date of birth.) He was the second son of Patrick O’Sullivan - an Irish immigrant who was said to be "Sydney's oldest cab driver" - and his Sydney-born wife Margaret O'Sullivan (née Hayes). Pat had an older brother named William, and remembered how they would both watch his father and uncle break the horses in.

Sullivan's family grew up in the working-class suburb of Darlinghurst. From a young age Sullivan enjoyed drawing, but his parents tried to discourage him with his father feeling he would not be able to make a living, and his mother once telling him: "What's the use of drawing silly bits on a piece of paper?"

During his childhood, Sullivan's mother died, and he and his brother were raised by their father. Sullivan was educated by the Marist Brothers at St. Benedict's School in Chippendale, and later St. Mary's Cathedral Boys' School in Woolloomooloo. As a child Sullivan produced a newspaper with some friends called Blowflies. One of Sullivan's childhood friends, Tom Doyle, recalled how he, Pat and William, would earn extra money performing outside of hotels.

== Early career ==
=== Sydney, London and New York ===
After graduating from High School, Sullivan worked as a gatekeeper at Toohey's Brewery in Surry Hills, and attended classes at the Art Society of New South Wales. Sullivan eventually contributed occasional cartoons and illustrations to newspapers and magazines, such as The Australian Worker, The Gadfly and The Bulletin, as well as short-lived a humour magazine called Vumps which he co-founded. As Sullivan remembered: "The happiest moment of my life was when my first cartoon was published."

It was around this time he dropped the "O" from his surname, most likely to avoid anti-Irish sentiment of the time.

In 1907, the then 22-year-old Sullivan left Australia to find more prosperous work in London. He was unsuccessful, and ended up homeless, often spending his nights sleeping on the Thames Embankment. When he was finally able to sell some drawings on Fleet Street for a few shillings each, he found lodgings in South London. As he recalled: "In one of them my landlady used to drink my whiskey when I was out. So I wrote the word 'poison' in large letters on the label. But she still went on drinking the whisky. I found out, afterwards, that she could not read." This anecdote is the earliest documentation of Sullivan's alcoholism. Sullivan ultimately sold a few cartoons to humorous weekly magazines such as Ally Sloper's Half Holiday and Sketchy Bits, as well as newspapers like London Bulletin and the Daily Mail.

Unsatisfied with the meagre earnings from these cartoons, Sullivan then began appearing in London Music Hall doing a song-and-dance act with his friend George Clardey - who later became an animator at Sullivan's studio. As Otto Messmer later remembered of Sullivan and Clardey's act: "Sullivan would come out [on stage] and he would draw a face. They had some trick where Clardy on the other side [of the drawing board] - the face would animate. They would substitute a red balloon [for a nose]. Blow it up." This act was ultimately a failure, and Sullivan then turned to business side of theatre managing, becoming one of the first motion picture exhibitors in England. However this endeavour was also unsuccessful and Sullivan ended up going bankrupt. Out of desperation, Sullivan spent the next year working on-and-off as a mule herder, helping to ship the animals from England to Missouri, United States.

In 1909, while the ship was docked in New York Harbor, Sullivan jumped ship and swam to shore. He remained in New York City for the rest of his life. As Sullivan recalled, his first job in America was as a shoeshiner, as he remembered:

"The first job I went after in New York was that of a shoeshine. The advertisement directed one to apply to 'Mike'. I walked from 22nd street to 125th street, hoping to find a sympathetic Irishman who would give me the job. I found ‘Mike’ to be an Italian. Shoe shiners, glorying in Irish names there, are generally Italians."

Eventually having grown "hard and strong" from herding mules, Sullivan then tried professional boxing, however after a while he ultimately decided it was too intense for him.

In 1911, Sullivan finally began to find some success when he landed a job at the struggling McClure Syndicate. After spending three years working on-and-off at McClure, Sullivan became one of several assistants to William F. Marriner on his comic strip Sambo and His Funny Noises - starring a stereotypical African American child based on the character of Little Black Sambo by Helen Bannerman. Sullivan worked well as Marriner's assistant, since their art styles were very similar and they were both alcoholics. During this time Sullivan also created his own comic strips, Willing Waldo – He Wants Work and Old Pop Perkins. Animation historian John Canemaker describes Sullivan's artwork in these strips as poor: "Sullivan's penline is thin, his characters circular, the action minimal, and the staging stilted. Walking characters are usually shown in extreme profile, one foot thrust forward. A slight variation is used to simulate the agitated movements of a chase: characters in profile, both legs spread wide, with action lines and dust and sweat symbols to indicate speed and exertion. Backgrounds are simple, often containing a titled line to represent a landscape that holds a tree or, more often, a triangle-roofed house with a line of smoke curling out of a chimney."

On the evening of October 8, 1914, while at his summer home in Harrington Park near Hackensack, New Jersey, Marriner's wife caught him drinking, and decided to leave him. Distraught, Marriner then committed suicide by burning the house down with himself inside. His charred remains were found the next morning. After Marriner's death, Sullivan ghosted the Sambo and His Funny Noises strip, but without Marriner's involvement the strip declined in popularity and was cancelled by the end of the year.

=== Early animation career ===
After Marriner's death, Sullivan began to be intrigued by the newly popular medium of animation - popularised by Winsor McCay's Gertie the Dinosaur (1914) - and early animation studios began to emerge in New York. Around late-1914 Sullivan used his salesmanship skills to obtain on the job at the Raoul Barré studio in Fordham, Bronx. Sullivan began learning the craft of animation from Gregory La Cava, Frank Moser and Bill Nolan (who would later become an animator at his studio) while working on The Animated Grouch Chasers series. As animation historian Michael Barrier writes of Sullivan's animation: "to judge by from such surviving evidence as his 1919... cartoon called Origin of Shimmie, never a very good one." Sullivan was ultimately fired after only nine months "...as his work was unsatisfactory...", however he still gained valuable knowledge about animation production.

Sullivan then briefly worked for the International Film Service, an animation studio set up by newspaper magnate William Randolph Hearst to create animated adaptations of his popular comic strips, and was hiring away many of Barré's former animators. During this time Sullivan became acquainted with Pat Powers - the then treasurer of Universal Pictures - who was putting together a screen magazine for the studio. Powers convinced Sullivan to open his own animation studio, for which Universal would provide financial backing and distribute his films.

In mid-1915 Sullivan opened his own animation studio on 121 West 42nd Street. Sullivan decided to make an animated adaptation of Marriner's Sambo and His Funny Noises strip, however changed the character's name to Sammy Johnsin in order to avoid paying Marriner's family and estate royalties.

Sullivan would photograph his drawings at Universal's backlot in Fort Lee, New Jersey, since at the time the studio allowed anyone to use their camera equipment and facilities for a small fee. It was here where Sullivan was shown a test-film called Motor Matt by an aspiring young animator named Otto Messmer. Sullivan immediately offered Messmer a job, but Messmer initially turned it down in favour of working with renowned newspaper cartoonist Hy Mayer on an elaborate commercial film for Auerbach's Chocolates called The Travels of Teddy - starring a caricatured version of Mayer's personal friend, former U.S. President Theodore Roosevelt. After Messmer's work on Travels of Teddy was complete in early-1916, Messmer accepted Sullivan's job offer. By this point the Sullivan Studio had moved its location to the nearby building at 125 West 42nd Street.

Messmer very quickly became Sullivan's top animator, since unlike the other cartoonists Sullivan was hiring, Messmer already had some experience with animation and only needed some minor refinement. As Messmer later stated: "I give [Sullivan] great credit, he taught me a lot of things about timing, and so forth. He began to get a few other fellas and we each made our own conception, any creation that came into our minds, and he would sell it." Messmer was also fast, able to turn out more footage than his colleagues.

Other cartoonist that worked for Sullivan during the early years included Charles Saxon, Will Anderson, William Stark, Charles Stanton, R. Eggeman, W.E. Stork, Bill Cause, and Arthur T. Crichton. Sullivan's staff also included two friends Sullivan had made while in England, Ernest Smythe and his former music hall partner George Clardey. The studio had a handful of female ink and paint artists (known as ink and 'blackeners' at the time), one of which according to Messmer, was Marjoire Gallagher who later became romantically involved with Sullivan. Another female artist at the studio, Mildred Walker, worked as a 'blackener'. She was also later a witness to Sullivan's hasty marriage.

A total of twelve Sammy Johnsin cartoons were made: nine between March and December 1916, and only three throughout 1917. According to Messmer, the Sammy Johnsin series was discontinued due movie exhibitors in the South objecting to an African-American child being the lead character. The studio replaced the Sammy Johnsin series with several other short lived series including: Fearless Freddy and Willie Slate by Messmer, and Willie Winks, Boomer Bill, Boxcar Bill and Hardrock Doome by Sullivan and other members of the staff - as well as various one-shot cartoons.

By 1917, Sullivan began relegating the creative control and directorial duties of the films to Messmer and the other members of his staff, while he mainly concentrated on business affairs. In his personal life, Sullivan dated a variety of women, often entertaining them back at his apartment on 10 Manhattan Avenue - all while still maintaining his long-time relationship with Gallagher.

Charlie in Turkey (1919, animated film) starring the tramp Charlie (known from the Chaplin movies). After visiting a secondhand bookstore, Charlie dreams that he abducts the Queen of Sheba. But behind the veil of this Turkish lady awaits a surprise.

In the Spring of 1917, Sullivan reached out to Charlie Chaplin, and offered to create a series of cartoons based on his popular film character of The Tramp. Chaplin had previously commissioned Tramp cartoons from John C. Terry's (brother of Paul Terry) Movca Film Studio in San Francisco, and from his own Essanay Studios, headed by cartoonist Wallace Carlson. Chaplin loved the idea and sent thirty photographs of himself in different poses to serve as a guide for the animators. Messmer - a huge Chaplin fan himself - was thrilled to work on this project and later said Chaplin's work had a profound influence on Felix the Cat.

Messmer and his staff originally conceived of an elaborate 40 minute feature-length film, with The Tramp battling the Kaiser. Messmer and his team completed over approximately 17–20 minutes of the film, (Note: Sullivan told ''Motion Picture World on 6 July 1918 he had over 8,500 "completed drawings" on the Chaplin feature. According to Canemaker, it took roughly 2,500 to 3,000 drawings to produce a 6 minute Felix the Cat cartoon. Therefore it can be deduced that roughly 17-20 minutes of the film had been completed.) but their work was interrupted when the studio closed due to Pat Sullivan's arrest and incarseration. After Sullivan's release in July 1918, the studio re-opened and work on the Chaplin series resumed. However, realising the massive undertaking of producing a feature-length animated film, and in the interest of saving himself time and money, Sullivan decided to break the Chaplin feature up into four separate one-reel shorts, with a continuing storyline. The first in this series was How Charlie Chaplin Captured the Kaiser (2 September 1918) and was followed by Over the Rhine with Charlie (21 December 1918), Charlie in Turkey (29 January 1919) and Charlie Treats 'Em Rough (2 March 1919). Since Messmer was away serving in World War I at the time, Sullivan hired Bill Cause as a temporary replacement until Messmer was able to return on 28 May 1919 - after which Messmer continued his work on the Chaplin series. The Sullivan studio made an additional six Chaplin cartoons before concluding series in October 1919.

== Felix the Cat ==
=== Origin and authorship dispute ===
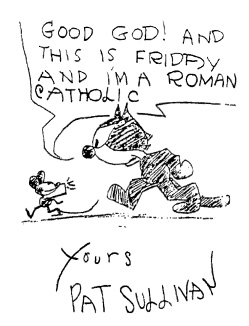
A sketch for a fan by Pat Sullivan. Samples such as this were used to match Sullivan's lettering in the initial works of Felix.

In June 1919, John Randolph Bray - who had been producing a variety of animated and live-action short subjects in the Paramount-Bray Picturgraph screen magazine since 1915 - ended his distribution deal with Paramount Pictures in favour of more lucrative deal with Samuel Goldwyn. Paramount responded by rebranding the Picturgraph as the Paramount Screen Magazine, and hired animators Earl Hurd and Frank Moser to produce new cartoons for the program. Hurd began falling behind schedule, so he reached out to Pat Sullivan and asked if he could supply a cartoon for the magazine. The result was the cartoon Feline Follies – released on 9 November 1919 – which featured the character of "Master Tom", who would later be known as Felix the Cat.

It is disputed whether this short and the character of Felix the Cat was created by Sullivan or Otto Messmer. During the height of Felix's popularity and until his death, Sullivan claimed sole credit for the character's creation. Beginning in May 1924, while on a six-week tour of England, Sullivan gave the first account of Felix's origin that he would frequently repeat:

"I have earned all the cash for the Felix idea, but my wife has the credit. She came into my room one day carrying a stray cat – just an ordinary, black garden, music-making, narrow-tailed, un-pedigreed sort of cat. 'Everybody cartoons men. Why not create an animal cartoon?’ That was how Felix began."

On other occasions, he claimed that Felix had been inspired by Rudyard Kipling's The Cat that Walked by Himself. As Australian cartoonist, and Sullivan's friend, Kerwin Maegraith told The Sydney Mail in 1936, Sullivan decided to name the character Felix after Australia Felix; a term from Australian history and a title of a popular 1917 novel by Henry Handel Richardson. Maegraith also stated that Sullivan decided to make Felix a black cat, after West-Indian-born Australian black boxer Peter Felix - who as Sullivan claimed "...used to frighten us kids in Sydney." Australian writer Hugh McCrae claimed he shared an apartment with Pat Sullivan just before Felix was created. As a 1953 article in the Sydney Morning Herald wrote: "It comes properly as a postscript that in New York McCrae shared a flat with Pat Sullivan, the famed creator of 'Felix, the Cat'. When a film about Felix was being planned, Sullivan suggested that McCrae should do the drawings while he (Sullivan) supplied the ideas. McCrae refused and has regretted it ever since."

Beginning in 1967, Messmer claimed he had created the short Feline Follies almost entirely by himself. As he remembered, Sullivan almost turned down Hurd's offer since he was busy, but ultimately agreed, and told Messmer: "If you want to do it on the side, you can do any little thing to satisfy them." Messmer then animated the film by himself on nights and weekends in his home in New Jersey. To save himself time, he decided to make a film about a little black cat, and made him all-black "...because it saves making a lot of outlines, and solid black moves better."

Like Sullivan, Messmer also claimed to have been inspired by Kipling's The Cat Who Walked by Himself.

Australian cartoonists and historians have disputed Messmer's claims, with Australian cartoonist Lindsay Foyle stating: "...it's the American claiming - yet again - something that was created elsewhere to be their own when there's ample evidence to suggest that they only borrowed it..." Australian cartoonist Gerald Carr noted that the comic-style effects in Feline Follies, and the lettering in the dialogue captions matches Sullivan's art-style and handwriting as opposed to Messmer's. In particular, Carr notes that towards the end of the cartoon, one of the cat's says "Alo Mum" - with the word for mother being spent the Australian-British way of 'M-U-M' as opposed to the American way of 'M-O-M'. Australian animation historians Dan and Lienors Torre, also note that some of the animation in Feline Follies at times seems to resemble Sullivan's comic strip artwork as opposed to Messmer's, and that "... there are a few sequences in Feline Follies that do appear to have been completed in rather contrasting styles, which might also point to the possibility that more than one animator was involved." While Messmer claimed to have animated the majority of the cartoon by himself at home, he also acknowledged that he eventually brought his rough animation drawings into the studio for "...a couple of girls who inked and blackened it in." Therefore, it is possible Sullivan may have had some involvement with Feline Follies.

According to Judy Nelson of the State Library of New South Wales, the now-lost Sullivan-produced short called The Tail or Thomas Kat (1917) - contained a precursor to Felix, and was copyrighted in Pat Sullivan's name. However, as the owner of the studio, every film produced by the Sullivan studios (even those that were not directed by him) were copyrighted to Pat Sullivan specifically. John Canemaker also points out that by 1917 Messmer (who had been working for the studio for over a year) was already directing many of the studio's shorts himself, while Sullivan had mainly resided himself to handling business matters. Furthermore, according to historian David Gerstein and film preservationist Tommy José Stathes, the earliest known existence of a black cat appearing in a Sullivan studios short is The Love Affair of Ima Knut, which predates the The Tail of Thomas Kat by one week and was directed by Messmer.

Dan and Lienors Torre also note that a Black cat character appeared in Sullivan's Chaplin cartoons that debuted when Messmer was away serving in World War I, and an add in Motion Picture World (most likely drawn by Sullivan) for the first entry in the series - How Charlie Captured the Kaiser - features a black cat reminiscent of the one in Feline Follies. However (as stated previously) production of the Chaplin series had begun in the Spring 1917 under Messmer's direction, prior Sullivan's arrest and the studio's temporary closure. After Sullivan's release from prison he told the press he had over 8,500 "completed drawings" (equating to roughly 17–20 minutes), meaning work on How Charlie Captured the Kaiser had already been largely been completed. The Torres also note that the cartoon Charley on the Farm contains a few gags similar to some of the ones in Feline Follies, stating: "... if nothing else, does point to the fact that the studio was very prone to recycle gags and characters from film to film."

Aside from a few female inkers and 'blackeners' (including Sullivan's wife Marjorie) – Sullivan and Messmer were the only people present at the studio during the production of Feline Follies. However all of the studio's subsequent employees attributed Felix's creation to Messmer, and none spoke in defense of Sullivan. Hal Walker, who was hired as Messmer's assistant in early-1920 (several months after the release of Feline Follies), later said "Otto was the brains of Felix the Cat..." Walker described the soft-spoken Messmer as: "...[a] leader, not a boss. He was my hero. And always defensive of Pat, the alcoholic." In contrast, Walker remembered Sullivan as being "usually ossified" with one of his regular unofficial duties being to escort Sullivan from the saloon in the lobby of the building where the studio was located, upstairs and lay him on a couch. Al Eugster - who at age 16 started as a 'blackener' at the Sullivan Studio on April 1, 1925 - described Messmer as "Mr. Felix the Cat, himself. Synonymous with Felix." As Eugster described Messmer's contribution to each Felix film:

"There was never a script. Otto did everything in his head. A film would begin with an idea and a few sketches that he would give to the head animator. Everyone would talk it over and start drawing. As he worked, Otto would continually think out loud of new ideas, for this film or for the next one, and when an animator would finish roughing out a scene, he would bring it to Otto who would look at it and OK it. He was animating and thinking at the same time. I don't know how he did it."

Whereas Eugster claimed he barely saw Sullivan during his time at the studio, who would only occasionally come in and go into his private office. Clyde "Gerry" Geronimi concured with Eugster, saying: "We saw Sully, but not too often. He was a heavy drinker and never took an active part in production. Otto Messmer actually ran the studio."

Outside of Australia, animation historians unanimously agree Messmer was the true creator of Felix the Cat: among them are Michael Barrier, Jerry Beck, John Canemaker, Donald Crafton, David Gerstein, Milt Gray, Mark Kausler, Leonard Maltin, and Charles Solomon.

During the height of Felix's popularity in the 1920s, neither Messmer nor any of the studio's other animators received any media publicity or screen credit on any of the Felix cartoons – which was exclusively reserved for Sullivan. As Messmer remembered: "Very few people in those days got credit. Most people in the industry knew that I was running the studio for him. But the public, all they got was 'by [Pat] Sullivan.'" In contrast to the numerous interviews Sullivan gave to the press about Felix throughout the decade, Messmer's name only appeared once in a 1925 article, where he was merely listed as a "production manager."

While Messmer admitted he was occasionally "a little bit" frustrated for not receiving credit for his work, he also stated: "But, you see, it was kind of a contented feeling that what we're doing is going [well]: it's a nice feeling. A feeling of security." Messmer ultimately claimed he had no resentment for not receiving credit for Felix's creation and his films at the time: "He [Sullivan] was the boss, the businessman; I was the foreman; the employee."

=== Business practices ===
==== Relationship with distributors ====
Feline Follies was originally intended to be a mere one-shot cartoon. However, as Messmer recalled, the short was well received by audiences, and Paramount: "...ordered another one, and another one..." Eventually, Paramount executive John King - the head of the Screen Magazine – commissioned an entire series with the character. After the second appearance of "Master Tom" in Musical Mews (released on November 16, 1919), he was finally given the name Felix in the character's third appearance, The Adventures of Felix (released on 14 December 1919). Messmer credited King with coming up with the name Felix - a combination of the words "feline" and "felicity".

In March 1920, Pat Sullivan officially signed a two-year contract with the Famous Players–Lasky Corporation to produce cartoons for the Paramount Screen Magazine, including one Felix cartoon per-month. By this time, the Sullivan Studio moved to 66th Street and Broadway on Manhattan's Upper West Side. A total of 25 Felix the Cat cartoons were released under the Paramount Screen Magazine between 1919 and 1921, and were modestly successful, with the cartoons receiving good reviews and Sullivan gaining some mild-media attention.

Despite Felix's growing popularity, the film industry was hit hard by the Recession of 1920–1921, and cartoon shorts especially suffered since the initial novelty animation had enjoyed during the late-1910s, was beginning to wear off with audiences. For this reason Paramount Pictures head Adolph Zukor decided to end the Screen Magazine. According to their March 1920 contract, Paramount owned the rights to the character of Felix, but Paramount ultimately relinquished these rights to Sullivan. According to Hal Walker, in a story Sullivan told him "once and only once", upon learning about the cancellation of the Screen Magazine, Sullivan got heavily intoxicated, stormed into Adolph Zukor's office, screamed at him, claiming he had been robbed and demanded the rights to Felix. Sullivan then allegedly got up and began urinating all over Zukor's desk. Disgusted, and wanting to avoid any further confrontations, Zukor then phoned the studio's top lawyer and ordered him to honour Sullivan's request.

After his distribution deal with Paramount ended, Sullivan then began shopping the series around to potential distributors. He eventually approached the Warner Features Company (the predecessor to Warner Bros.), who at the time had been distributing the Barré-Bowers Mutt and Jeff and Max Fleischer's Out of the Inkwell cartoons in the states of New York and New Jersey. After screening a few Felix films, Harry Warner was uninterested, but his executive secretary, Margaret Winkler, saw potential. Warner then encouraged Winkler to distribute the Felix the Cat series herself, and also offered her the Out of the Inkwell series – whose contract was set to expire by the end of the year. Winkler signed a contract with Sullivan on December 15, 1921, making her - at age 27 - the first female producer and distributor of animated films. Winkler commissioned Sullivan to produce 12 Felix cartoons, and agreed to pay him $1,000 for each of the first six films, and $1,200 for each of the remaining six, as well as 50% of all foreign earnings for each short. In early-1922 Margaret officially formed Winkler Pictures, and hired her brother George Winkler as an office manager, and fellow Warner executive Charles Mintz (who she later married) to handle contracts, while she concentrated on marketing and promotion.

Felix Saves the Day was the first Felix cartoon released under then new Winkler agreement on February 1, 1922. Winkler then began distributing the films to theatres on a states rights basis. By the end of March, Winkler had sold the Felix cartoons to 60% of all theatres in the United States, as well as the international market of Canada, and the Felix cartoons began screening in prestigious theatres such as New York's Rialto Theatre and Grauman's Chinese in Hollywood. Felix's popularity continued to grow throughout 1922, and on September 12 Winkler commissioned a second season of Felix shorts: doubling the amount to a total of 24 films – with one scheduled to be released every two-weeks. Winkler also agreed to increase the budget, and pay Sullivan $1,750 for each film. As a way to meet Winkler's demands, Messmer convinced Sullivan to expand his operations by moving the studio's location for a third (and final) time to the second floor on 47 West 63rd Street. After securing another year of Felix shorts, Winkler then arranged international distribution of the cartoons through Pathé in London. Pathé - using its European connections – distributed the cartoons across the world, turning Felix into an international icon.

Despite the immense popularity of the Felix series under Winkler, from the beginning she and Sullivan often clashed. Winkler aggressively promoted the release of each new Felix short, but some of her early publicity-material neglected to mention Sullivan's name. In one particular article in the April 1, 1922 issue of Moving Picture World, Winkler accidentally referred to Felix as "her" series, which infuriated Sullivan. Sullivan and Winkler also clashed over who should be allowed to design the posters for each short. On 8 April, in order to placate Sullivan, Winkler issued the following statement in Motion Picture News:

"Pat Sullivan, celebrated cartoonist and creator of the 'Felix' cartoon comics, the series of which are controlled for world-wide distribution by Miss M. J. Winkler, will henceforth be responsible for the poster illustrations as well as the subject matter of 'Felix' comics."

Ironically, Sullivan initially assigned Messmer to draw the one-sheet posters for every Felix film, in addition to his duties running the studio and providing the Sunday strip. (Note: In 1927, to alleviate his busy schedule, Messmer tasked one of his assistants Dana Parker to take over designing the posters.)

In late-1923, Sullivan once again got into conflicts with Winkler and her fiancé Charles Mintz On August 29, Winkler sent a letter to Sullivan commissioning another 24 Felix shorts under the same terms and conditions. However Sullivan refused unless they raised their advances to him beyond $1,750 per short. Over the next few months Winkler and Mintz tried to persuade Sullivan to renew his contract with them – but he refused. As George Winkler later said, "Pat Sullivan was a small man with a fiery temper. He wanted more for his product, but he boosted his price way too high." Sullivan came close to signing a new deal with Joe Brandt of CBC Film Sales Corporation - with an offer of 26 films budgeted at $3,500 each. When The Mintzes heard of this deal, Winkler quickly issued a statement in Film Daily threatening legal action, which scared Brandt off and then backed out of the deal. In early-February 1924, Harry Kopp began preparing lawsuit against The Mintzes, with a trial scheduled for the end of April. However the two parties ultimately settled out of court. As part of the settlement, Sullivan agreed to enter a new contract with Winkler Pictures on May 1, 1924: with Winkler ordering another 24 Felix cartoons, and agreeing to increase Sullivan's payment to $2,400 per short.

Immediately after signing the May 1924 contract, Sullivan went on a six-week tour of England. During the trip Sullivan was displeased to learn that much of the Felix merchandise in Britain was copyrighted to Pathé instead of him, and was poorly made looking nothing like the character. As Sullivan told one reporter, he found this: "...annoying to say the least, especially as some of them are so inferior in intellect... [and] looked as if they didn't know enough to wash their own faces." He was also horrified to learn that Pathé wasn't showing his Felix films in full reels, but in fragmented “chapter form” – which he described as being "mutilated". When Sullivan returned to America he told Harry Kopp to send a memo to Pathé demanding they turn over all British merchandising royalties to him immediately. This resulted in more fights between him, Winkler and Pathé, but was ultimately resolved in a three-way agreement.

The final straw for the Sullivan-Winkler relatationship came in March 1924: when Winkler began distributing the Alice Comedies series by a newcomer named Walt Disney – which featured the supporting of Julius the Cat, who bore a striking resemblance to Felix. In late-1923, during Winkler's heated contract disputes with Sullivan, she also lost her second biggest animated series - Out of the Inkwell - when the Fleischer brothers left to start their own distribution company; Red Seal Pictures. So, when Winkler received a copy of Disney's film Alice's Wonderland that October, she immediately commissioned a series of these films, in part as an "insurance policy" in case her relationship with Sullivan deteriorated any further. Winkler married Charles Mintz in November 1923, and a few months later retired from the business in order to focus on raising her children, with Mintz had taking over Winkler Pictures. According to animator Rudolf Ising, Julius was a result of Charles Mintz urging Disney and his staff to "...make their characters more like Felix." While Disney was hesitant to copy Felix since he didn't like imitating others, since he was young and new to industry, he reluctantly agreed. While there had been Felix imitators before, Sullivan was infuriated by Disney's perceived copyright infringement, since they shared the same distributor and decided to cut ties Winkler Pictures once his contract expired with them.

In February 1925, Harry Kopp (along with his wife Lena, and the partner in his firm, Sammuel Null) formed Bijou Films, Inc. – both as a way to profit off each Felix cartoon, and also to provide Sullivan protection against legal retaliation from Winkler. In March, Kopp then sailed to England, where he signed a new international distribution contract with the Ideal Film Company who ordered 24 Felix cartoons for a whopping $5,000 for each short - with the first one due immediately after the Winkler-Pathé contract expired in May. Kopp then travelled back to New York, and proceeded to negotiate with Earle W. Hammons of Educational Pictures for domestic distribution. Mintz and Winkler then immediately sued Sullivan, Kopp, Hammons and Educational Pictures. The trial took place over the summer, but on July 25, 1925 the New York Supreme Court ruled in favour of the defendants and the Mintzes lost the case. While they quickly filed tried to appeal - which was heard in January 1926 – but it was ultimately rejected on April 26.

According to Messmer, Margret Winkler was "heartbroken" over losing distribution of Felix the Cat. Having lost Sullivan, Mintz retaliated by forming his own studio, and acquired the rights to George Herriman's popular comic strip Krazy Kat as a replacement, forming a studio in New York City led by Sullivan animator Bill Nolan specifically to produce the series for Paramount. Disney created Oswald the Lucky Rabbit before leaving to create Mickey Mouse, both of which became more popular than Felix the Cat, eventually leading to Sullivan's studio losing any market share they had before closing in 1930.

==== Merchandising ====
By May 1922, Felix the Cat had become a national sensation, and Gund began manufacturing a series of stuffed Felix dolls. This was notable since - while several popular comic strip characters (who were later adapted into animated shorts) had been previously marketed as toys - Felix the Cat was the first cartoon character created explicitly for the medium of animation to receive any form of merchandise. The success of these Felix dolls provided easy additional income for Sullivan, and emboldened him to market the character as much as possible, with him reportedly accepting any deal from any licensee who walked into his office. Felix ultimately appeared on over 200 items around including dolls, toys, books, clothing, sporting goods, mechanical sparklers, waddling figurines, baby oil and even cigar boxes. Sullivan was paid on a royalty percentage basis, and he and his lawyer – Harry Kopp – were notoriously litigious, suing any manufacturer who used Felix's image without permission or payment. Sullivan's intense marketing strategy with Felix would later be replicated by Walt Disney when marketing his animated characters.

== Personal life ==
As Hal Walker described Sullivan's personality: "You wouldn't always notice he was drunk, it was a quiet thing. He was a mixed character in his moods. At times he was exceptionally friendly. Other times, he was a bore, a drunken ass."

After dating a variety of women, Sullivan married Margaret "Marjorie" Gallagher on May 21, 1917. Not much is known about Gallagher's history: she was born in 1888, (Note: Canemaker descibes Gallagher as "...a vivacious twenty-nine-year-old..." in 1917. Meaning her date of birth was some time in 1888.) and was one of seven daughters and two sons of Thomas and Sarah Gallagher in Scranton, Pennsylvania. She had been previously married to a man named J. J. Thomas, but not much is known about her first marriage or when she moved to New York. According to Otto Messmer, Gallagher met Sullivan when she started working as an inker at the Sullivan studio.

Throughout the 1920s, Sullivan and his wife engaged in a series of world tours promoting Felix the Cat. Towards the end of a six-week tour of England in early-1924, Sullivan complained to the press saying he was: "...tired of the cat... cannot shake it off, cannot travel anywhere but that it follows. On the voyage over he had to draw no fewer than 600 Felixes for fellow travellers, most of them hard-headed businessmen who ought to have known better." In another article titled, What I Suffer from Felix, he bemoaned that Felix was "...coming perilously near getting a strangle-hold on my personality... An old German guy called Frankenstein once started something he could not finish. Well, I just feel like that about Felix."

In December 1925, Sullivan visited Sydney, Australia to visit his now blind father. During this trip, The Argus asked how Sullivan was able to continue releasing two-dozen Felix cartoons every year while also going on several world tours. Sullivan responded by saying he was responsible for the "key-drawings" of each Felix cartoon, and: "I have left enough material in America to enable my staff to produce the fortnightly picture for some months to come..." As animation historian John Canemaker notes, "The production of animated cartoons is too complicated a process to be dictated long-distance, or, as Pat Sullivan claimed, by merely leaving 'key-drawings' behind for his staff to follow; it is an art and a craft that requires constant supervision and direct artistic input." However, since the general public had very little knowledge about how animated films were made at the time, they readily accepted Sullivan's explanation.

Little is known about the relationship between Pat and Marjorie Sullivan. Marjorie's niece, Betty Jean Buckley, who was a child during their marriage, fondly remembered occasional visits from her Uncle and Aunt in Scranton, and described them as: "...a great couple. Down to earth, easy-going and friendly." However, those who were adults at the time remembered them as an incredibly toxic couple. As Otto Messmer's wife, Anne, recalled: "...they had plenty of battles. Battling all the time. Miserable life. With all their money it didn't give them happiness." George Winkler remembered that Sullivan "...wasn't with her very much." The most scathing description of their marriage came from Hal Walker, who recalled:

"Pat was an alcoholic and a sex maniac. He was taking some of his money and financed a madam, put her in business in one of the famous hotels in New York City and had quite a stable of females. It was quite natural the outcome of this was that he developed syphilis, which he then gave to his wife, Marjorie. On that trip to England, it erupted so badly on her body that she had to wear specifically designed scarves to cover... her face and neck... They lived in the name of man and wife. I know personally he used Marjorie for purposes of influencing other men, which was a great discredit to Pat in my eyes. I just couldn’t believe such men existed."

== Controversies ==
=== 1917-18 Rape conviction and imprisonment ===
On Friday April 27, 1917, two teenage girls from Rutherford, New Jersey – Alice McCleary and Gladys Bowen (aged 14 and 15 respectively) rented a room at 132 West 42nd Street. They had run away from their home five days earlier with vague aspirations of making it on Broadway. From their room they could view the backyard and into the fourth floor of the neighbouring building on 125 West 42nd Street, where the Sullivan Studio was located. As they watched the animators work at their light tables, Pat Sullivan and Ernest Smythe noticed the girls and began to flirt with them. Eventually Smythe motioned the girls to come down stairs. Gladys went down and returned with an invitation to meet Smythe and Sullivan that evening. At 9 PM the two men took the girls to a nearby café on the corner of 6th Avenue and 43rd Street, where Sullivan bought alcoholic beverages for all four of them. The girls returned to their apartment and hour later. The next evening Sullivan and Smythe took the girls out to a bar and gave them several rounds of Crème de menthe. After some heavy petting Sullivan hailed a taxi back to his apartment, while Smythe escorted Alice and Gladys back to their rooming house; but not before Alice promised to meet Sullivan the next night.

On Sunday April 29, at 8 PM, Pat Sullivan arrived to pick up the 14-year-old Alice McCleary for their solo date. Alice was hesitant to go with him, but while in Gladys' presence, Sullivan urged her to come with him promising her she would come to no harm. The two boarded the 6th Avenue elevated train back to Sullivan's apartment at 10 Manhattan Avenue. Back at his apartment, Sullivan then piled Alice with alcohol and then raped her.

When Sullivan returned to the studio the next morning, he bragged to his staff how he had "screwed the dark one." George Clardey - Sullivan's former music hall partner in London turned animator - was determined "to get the girls away from [Sullivan] and his friends" and immediately took action. He arranged for the girls to speak to an acquaintance of his, a film actress by the name of Julia Siggins. Horrified by their story, she immediately found new lodgings for the girls on Seventh Avenue. Siggins also "noticed some suspicious stains on Alice's clothing", and it was later discovered that she contracted venereal disease from Sullivan.

Sullivan and Smythe were arrested on May 10, 1917. Smythe was charged with abduction, but was later lowered to "impairing morals" - while Sullivan was charged with the rape of an underage girl. On May 21, Sullivan was released on $2,500 bail, and hastily married his long-time girlfriend Marjorie Gallagher that same day at Manhattan's Municipal Building. The next day, Sullivan was indicted with the charge of rape in the second degree and arrested. After a trial, the jury found Sullivan guilty on June 21, with his sentencing scheduled for September 13. Between his indictment and his sentencing, Sullivan was detained in the The Tombs.

After the verdict, Sullivan hired a second lawyer, Harry Kopp, who filed a motion on August 29, 1917 to set aside the conviction judgement rendered against Sullivan on the ground of newly discovered evidence. This motion was denied, for "in the opinion of his court, the verdict of the jury was justified by the evidence" and the "alleged facts" made to support a new trial "would not, had they been presented at the trial, have changed the result." However Judge C. T. Crain took into consideration that Sullivan was "a man of very considerable ability... without a criminal record" and also acknowledged receiving a number of letters "from reputable people" who spoke well of him. One of these people was Sullivan's wife Marjorie, who the day before the sentencing wrote to the judge saying: "...if you will be as lenient with my husband's sentence (Pat Sullivan) as possible, for I know, if anyone knows, he's innocent of this crime. Justly you will listen to my plea and down in my heart I ask this only favor."

Judge Cain ultimately agreed that Sullivan had been "...punished by the imprisonment which you have undergone between the date of your conviction and this day... [and] although that confinement was really at your own request, [it] ought to be taken into consideration in the imposition of the sentence." While the maximum penalty for a person convicted of rape in the second degree at the time was 10 years in prison; Judge Crain sentenced Sullivan to Sing Sing Correctional Facility "...for not less than one year and not more than two."

Sullivan ultimately served a total of 9 months in prison. On July 6, 1919, Motion Picture World ran an article announcing Sullivan's return to producing animated cartoons, without mentioning where he was returning from or why he had left in the first place. Sullivan's then-distributor, Universal Pictures, welcomed his return and agreed to distribute his cartoons as part of their Nestor line. Harry Kopp remained Sullivan's attorney until his death. Due to Sullivan being a convicted felon, he was exempt from the draft during World War I.

While Sullivan was imprisoned, the studio closed and the animators found work at other animation studios. After returning from his military service on May 28, 1919, Otto Messmer was the only member of Sullivan's staff to return to the studio. Throughout his lifetime, Messmer refused to discuss his boss's rape conviction, but he claimed to have had sympathy for Sullivan's alcoholism: "I saw him cry like a baby trying to overcome that weakness. That's why there's sympathy for him. He went to the cardinal there at St. Patrick's. Tried to get some strength. He couldn't stop that drinking. Terrible."

No newspaper articles covered the event at the time - nor did any of the subsequent Felix press coverage and numerous interviews Sullivan received during his life ever mention his rape conviction - and for many decades Sullivan's crime was merely an urban legend amongst animation industry veterans. It wasn't until animation historian John Canemaker was conducting research for his 1991 book, Felix: The Twisted Tale of the World's Most Famous Cat, that he uncovered letters and court documents revealing Sullivan's crime.

=== Poor studio working conditions ===
The Sullivan studio was reported to have extremely poor working conditions for its animators, and Pat Sullivan was reportedly abusive towards his staff. The studio's equipment was inadequate, with the cameraman using an old Bell & Howell 35 mm camera to photograph the animation drawings, that was stationary and unable to zoom in or out, and these shots had to be animated by hand causing extra work for the animators. As Al Eugster remembered: "Everything was set, and they [the animators] worked on one field, which was very confining."

Sullivan's animators staff were all underpaid. By the late-1920s Sullivan had become a millionaire, and according to a June 1927 article, Sullivan earning royalty checks of at least $1,500 per month. Meanwhile, Sullivan's top animators were paid only $25 a week, with lower ranking assistants being paid only $10 a week. (Note: According to John Canemaker's book Felix: The Twisted Tale of the World's Most Famous Cat, Hal Walker is quoted as saying he was hired at: "...a flat salary of $25 a week." Canemaker also writes of Al Eugster's hiring as a 'blackener': "He [Eugster] was paid ten dollars a week, nine dollars less than what he earned doing odd jobs at American Radiator Company...When Eugster left the studio in 1929, his salary was twenty-five dollars a week.")

Al Eugster recalled that when a photograph was being taken of the staff, Sullivan forced all the animators to move down one seat so he could sit at the desk closest towards the camera - a seat that was usually reserved for Messmer. After being dismissed from Sullivan in 1929, Eugster went to work at Fleischer Studios, where he became life-long friends with Shamus Culhane. As Culhane wrote in his 1986 autobiography:

Al Eugster had some pretty funny stories... about working for Pat Sullivan at Felix the Cat. Pat seems to have been the most consistent man in the business – consistent in the fact that he was never sober... Otto Messmer, who must have had the patience of Job, had designed Felix, was running the studio, and took care of Sullivan when he made a visit to New York. Fortunately those trips were infrequent. Pat and his wife spent most of their time traveling around the world accepting plaudits for Felix and making speeches in which Pat modestly claimed full credit for the production and design of the character. Because Felix was the most popular animated cartoon of the day, Sullivan got a royal welcome wherever he went, and he spent money to match. However, as often happens, he was very closefisted about [the] salaries he paid his staff, including Otto Messmer. When Sullivan arrived at the studio, the first thing he did was to toss a bundle of dirty clothes to the nearest person. Even if that person was an animator, he was expected to rush off to the nearest laundry. Any hesitation, fancied or real, and Sullivan would launch into a torrent of drunken abuse and fire the man on the spot. As Pat watched with blurry satisfaction, Otto would solemnly write out a check and the dismissed employee would take the day off. The next day he would appear for work as usual, and Sullivan would remember nothing of the incident because of his alcoholic amnesia.

=== Racism ===
Sullivan also reportedly carried a strong bias against African-Americans. According to Rudy Zamora, when he and Eddie Salter tested for positions at the Sullivan studio, they were bested by a young African-American boy. Zamora recalled that animator Dana Parker "took the black boy [aside] and told him that they'll call him when they needed him, [as they were] not hiring anyone that day. But they kept Eddie and I. That was lousy. Then they would have hired this black guy and myself. Ed was third." When Zamora complained about this to Parker, he was told, "The old man [Sullivan] didn't want any black guys."

== Sound films and decline ==
After Warner Bros. released The Jazz Singer on October 6, 1927, the film industry quickly began to transition to sound. In 1928, after losing the rights to Oswald the Lucky Rabbit to Charles Mintz and Universal Pictures, Walt Disney collaborated with his lead animator, Ub Iwerks, to create Mickey Mouse. Their decision to pivot the series to sound cartoons led to the series' phenomenal success.

Otto Messmer – who had been acquainted with Disney through Margaret Winkler – caught wind of Disney's experiments with sound, and tried to convince Sullivan to follow suit. However Sullivan, who had been removed from the filmmaking process for many years and whose decision making was impaired by his alcoholism, refused by simply saying: "Why change?"

Steamboat Willie premiered on November 18, 1928 at New York City's Colony Theatre – just ten blocks away from the Sullivan Studio - to instant critical acclaim and commercial success. Shortly afterward, Sullivan met with Educational Pictures to renew his contract for the 1928-1929 film season. Educational insisted Sullivan begin making Felix cartoons in sound, but Sullivan once again refused. Educational responded by immediately cancelling Sullivan's contract.

After being dropped by Educational Pictures, Sullivan then began laying off the entire staff outside of Messmer. As Hal Walker, who had been at the studio since 1920, remembered: "I'll never forget the total frustration that I had of dejection of being fired. When I told [my wife] Gladys, it was like the world came to an end. I was eating, breathing, and sleeping Felix the Cat. It was a very difficult thing for me to recondition myself to think beyond my immediate chaotic condition." Fortunately, since the animation industry was now thriving due to Disney's success, the former Sullivan animators quickly found new jobs at other studios.

Eventually Sullivan decided to convert to sound, and made a deal with former Bray Studios manager Jacques Kopfstein who was now running his own studio: Copley Pictures Corporation. Messmer - the only Sullivan employee who remained - along with a small skeleton crew of freelancers who were hired when needed, began creating new Felix cartoons for sound. Meanwhile, Bernard Altshuler's Symphonic Recording Orchestra created the scores for these cartoons, while Harry Edison provided the sound effects. However unlike Disney, who carefully planned the music and sound effects for his cartoons ahead of time, Sullivan's sound Felix cartoons were hastily post synchronized. As former Sullivan animator, Gerry Germonini remembered: "Pat Sullivan never wanted to do anything like Disney. He never wanted to improve the product. He never wanted to pre-record the sound, or score the pictures; he said, 'Ah, we'll do 'em like we always did 'em, the hell with it.' He called Disney a Midwest farmer who didn't know how to produce cartoons." This resulted in audio that animation historian John Canemaker described as: "...sloppy, rarely matching the action on the screen. [The] Music and effects were also unimaginatively produced; Felix's 'voice', for example, became an annoying whine."

These cartoons were poorly received by audiences, and by 1930 Walt Disney's Mickey Mouse had completely overtaken Felix the Cat in popularity. Early that same year, Sullivan announced he was planning on moving his staff to Los Angeles and was in talks with Technicolor and Harriscolor to make a series of colour Felix cartoons, but neither of these things were true, and were just attempts by Sullivan to spark interest in his ailing cartoon character. In December 1930, Sullivan gave one of his last interviews in an obscure fanzine called The Commerce Caravel, where he answered some questions for two cartoon fans. Canemaker describes the interview as: "...a textbook example of a faded celebrity attempting to put on a smooth show of confidence for what remains of his public." When entering the studio, the two fans noticed the lack of activity and asked: "Is Felix working on any picture now?" Sullivan assured them: "Of course he is, Mr. Thurber – our photographer – is in the midst of one. We have arranged no title as of yet."

By 1931, production of all cartoons at the Sullivan studio had ground to a halt, and most Felix the Cat merchandise had been discontinued. The only thing that remained was the daily and Sunday Felix the Cat comic strips, but only because Sullivan's original contract with King Features Syndicate stated that the strips were to be continued until 1934.

== Final years and death ==
With the loss of his studio, Sullivan then began to be fully consumed by his alcoholism.

On Saturday March 26, 1932, Marjorie Gallagher Sullivan, leaned out of her apartment window on the second floor of the Forrest Hotel on 49th Street in an attempt to attract the attention of her chauffeur in a garage across the street, then suddenly fell out of the window to her death. The circumstances around her death are in dispute. Her death certificate read that she "fell or jumped from residence to ground" headfirst. Both Hal Walker and the daughters of Harry Kopp felt she committed suicide, while Messmer disagreed, saying Marjorie "loved life too much" and he felt her death was accidental. Marjorie's niece, Betty Jean Buckley, agreed with Messmer, stating that "She never jumped. She had everything." Some have even speculated that Marjoie was murdered by Sullivan by pushing her out of the window, as it had also been rumoured that she was having an affair with the chauffeur; however, this has never been confirmed.

Marjorie Gallagher Sullivan was buried four days after her death, upon which she left Sullivan an estate of over $70,000. According to Harry Kopp, Sullivan subsequently spent much of this money on hiring prostitutes, "...and issuing a great number of checks without any consideration, a large number of which were returned for insufficient funds."

Throughout 1932, stricken with grief over the death of his wife, combined with his years of alcoholism and also possibly the final stage of syphilis that affects the brain, Sullivan's mental and physical health rapidly began to deteriorate. At this time, Otto Messmer was Sullivan's only remaining employee and by this point his sole job was to write and draw the Felix comic strips under Sullivan's name. As he recalled, toward the end of 1932 Sullivan was unable to recognize him, and his handwriting had become so illegible that Messmer had difficulty cashing his paychecks.

As Kerwin Maegraith recalled in 1936: "...having returned from Miami, where he [Sullivan] had vainly tried to recover some of his lost health and spirits, he caught a severe chill; double pneumonia developed..."

Pat Sullivan died of "chronic alcoholism" and "terminal lobular pneumonia" in the Sherman Square Hospital, at 9:15 A.M. on February 15, 1933 at age 47. Only Sullivan's pneumonia was reported in the press at the time.

According to Otto Messmer, Sullivan had promised to leave both the studio and the rights to Felix the Cat to him in his will, but upon his death it was revealed Sullivan had no will. Instead, Harry Kopp became the executor of Sullivan's estate, officially closed the studio and eventually arranged the rights to Felix the Cat to be inherited by Sullivan's older brother, William J. O'Sullivan, in Australia. For the rest of his life, Messmer blamed Kopp for cheating him out of the rights to Felix. As Shamus Culhane wrote: "Otto never got a dime."

=== Legacy ===
William J. O'Sullivan retained rights to Felix the Cat until his death in 1950, upon which the rights were inherited by his son (and Pat Sullivan's nephew) - Patrick O'Sullivan. In the Summer of 1950, Patrick O'Sullivan moved to New York, and in May 1951 formed Felix the Cat Productions, Inc.

Otto Messmer continued to write and draw the Felix daily and Sunday comic strips well into the early-1950s; (Note: The Felix the Cat Sunday strip was cancelled on September 19, 1943, but the daily strip continued until 1967.) as well as maintaining a full-time job at the Douglas Leigh Organisation (beginning in 1937) designing light displays in Times Square, and briefly returning to animation by working as a writer at Famous Studios during World War II. Messmer was ultimately fired from the Felix comic strip in 1954 by King Features and Felix the Cat Productions due to his stories becoming repetitive. Messmer spent the rest of career at the Douglas Leigh Organisation until his retirement in 1973.

The strip was taken over by Messmer's assistant (and former Famous Studios colleague) Joe Oriolo, who would later helm Felix's successful 1958 television revival. Eventually Joe Oriolo became a 50% co-owner of Felix the Cat Productions, along with Patrick O'Sullivan. After Patrick O'Sullivan's death in 1971, Oriolo gained full ownership of the company and rights to Felix the Cat, and made a concerted effort to give Messmer the credit he had long been denied. Throughout the 1970s, Otto Messmer received a variety of media attention, awards and honours throughout the animation industry until his death on October 28, 1983.

Joe Oriolo subsequently died on December 25, 1985, after which his son, Don Oriolo, took over Felix the Cat Productions and the rights to the character. On June 17, 2014, Don Oriolo sold Felix the Cat Productions to DreamWorks Animation, who incorporated it into their DreamWorks Classics division. In 2016, DreamWorks Animation was purchased by Comcast's NBCUniversal, who as of 2026, continue to own the trademark rights to Felix the Cat.

== In popular culture ==
- The Simpsons episode The Day the Violence Died is said to have been largely based on Pat Sullivan and Otto Messmer's relationship, and the dispute over who created Felix the Cat.

== Character creations ==
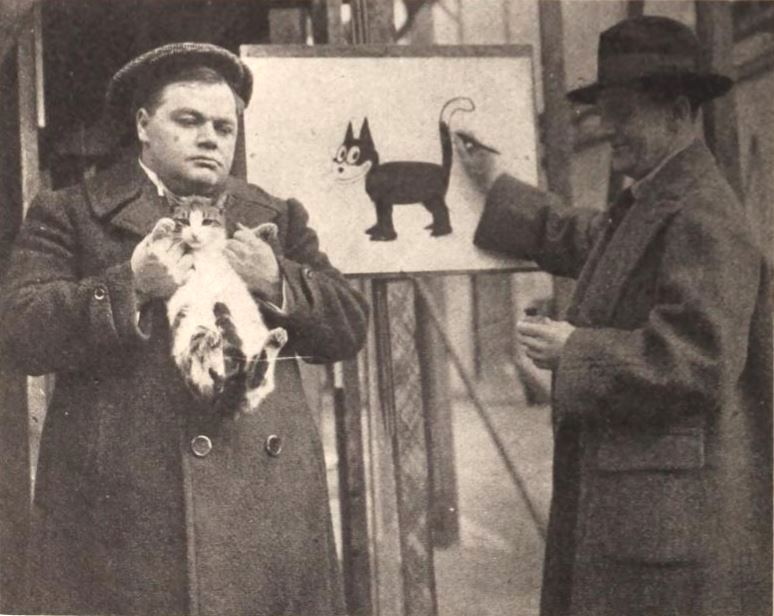
Roscoe Arbuckle holding Lasky Studio cat "Ethel" as model for Pat Sullivan to draw his Felix the Cat for the Paramount Magazine, on page 78 of the 12 March 1921 Exhibitors Herald.

- Felix the Cat (disputed)
- Great Idea Jerry
- Willing Waldo
- Old Pop Perkins
- Johnny Boston Beans
- Obliging Oliver
