= Milt Gray =

American baseball player (1914–1969)

- Catcher
- Born: February 21, 1914; Louisville, Kentucky
- Died: June 30, 1969 (aged 55); Quincy, Florida
- Batted: Right Threw: Right

MLB debut
- May 27, 1937, for the Washington Senators

Last MLB appearance
- May 28, 1937, for the Washington Senators

MLB statistics
- Games played: 2
- At bats: 6
- Hits: 0
- Stats at Baseball Reference

Teams
- Washington Senators (1937)

Milton Marshall Gray (February 21, 1914 – June 30, 1969) was a Major League Baseball catcher who played in two games for the Washington Senators in 1937.
