= Australia Felix =

Australia Felix (Latin for "fortunate Australia" or "happy Australia") was an early name given by Thomas Mitchell to lush pasture in parts of western Victoria he explored in 1836 on his third expedition.

On this expedition Mitchell was instructed to travel to Menindee, then down the Darling River to the sea, if it flowed there; or, if it flowed into the Murray River to go up the Murray to the inhabited parts of the colony.

However lack of water forced Mitchell to follow the Lachlan River to the south-west as the only practicable route. He reached the Murrumbidgee on 12 May and followed it to the Murray.

At the end of May, Mitchell reached the Darling and turned north upstream. He soon decided, while still about 200 km (120 mi) in a direct line from Menindee, to abandon the survey of the deserts around the Darling and to use his resources to explore the more promising country along the Murray.

Retracing his steps Mitchell went up the Murray until 20 June when he reached the junction of the Loddon where the country seemed so promising that he turned south-west into what is now Victoria and was so enchanted by the area he called it “Australia Felix”.

The reports of excellent farming land from Mitchell's return to Sydney with the news started a land rush.
