= Heracles in popular culture =

Mythological hero

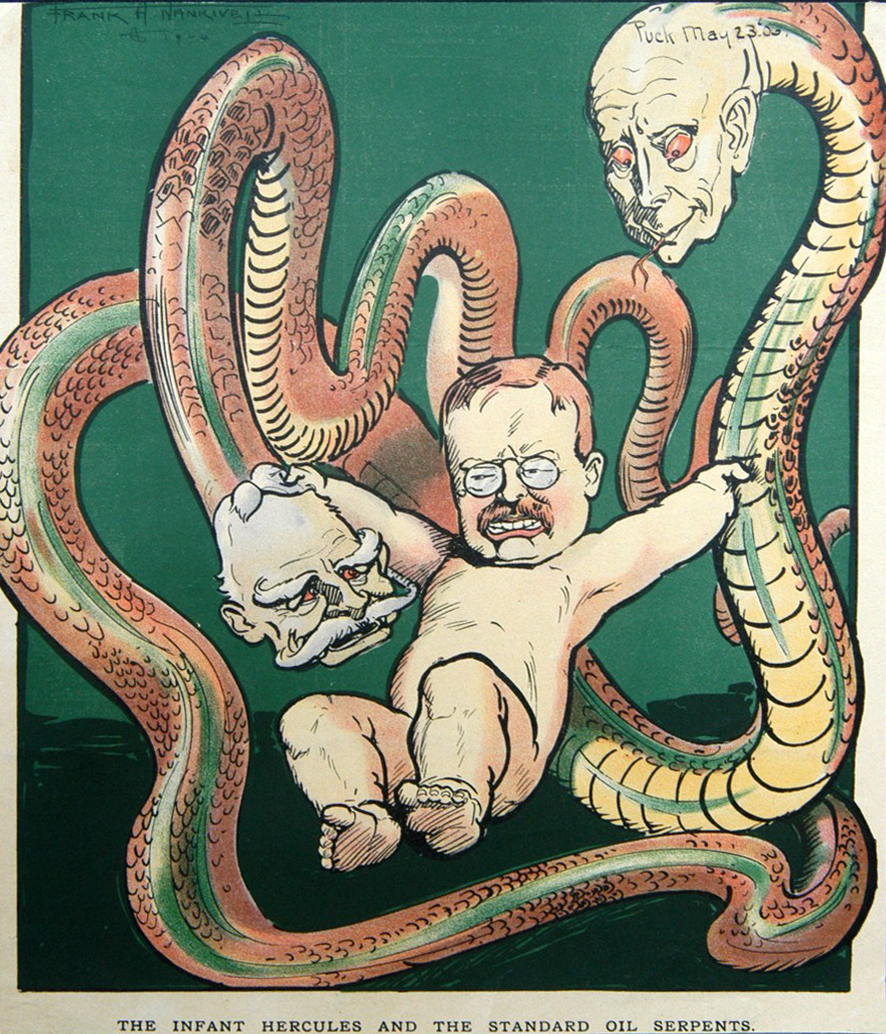
U.S. President Theodore Roosevelt depicted as the infant Hercules grappling with the Standard Oil Company

Heracles, also known as Hercules, is a Greek and Roman mythological hero known for his strength and far-ranging adventures. He is one of the most commonly portrayed figures from classical mythology in the popular culture of the 20th and 21st centuries.

== Filmography ==
=== Italian, 1950s–1960s ===
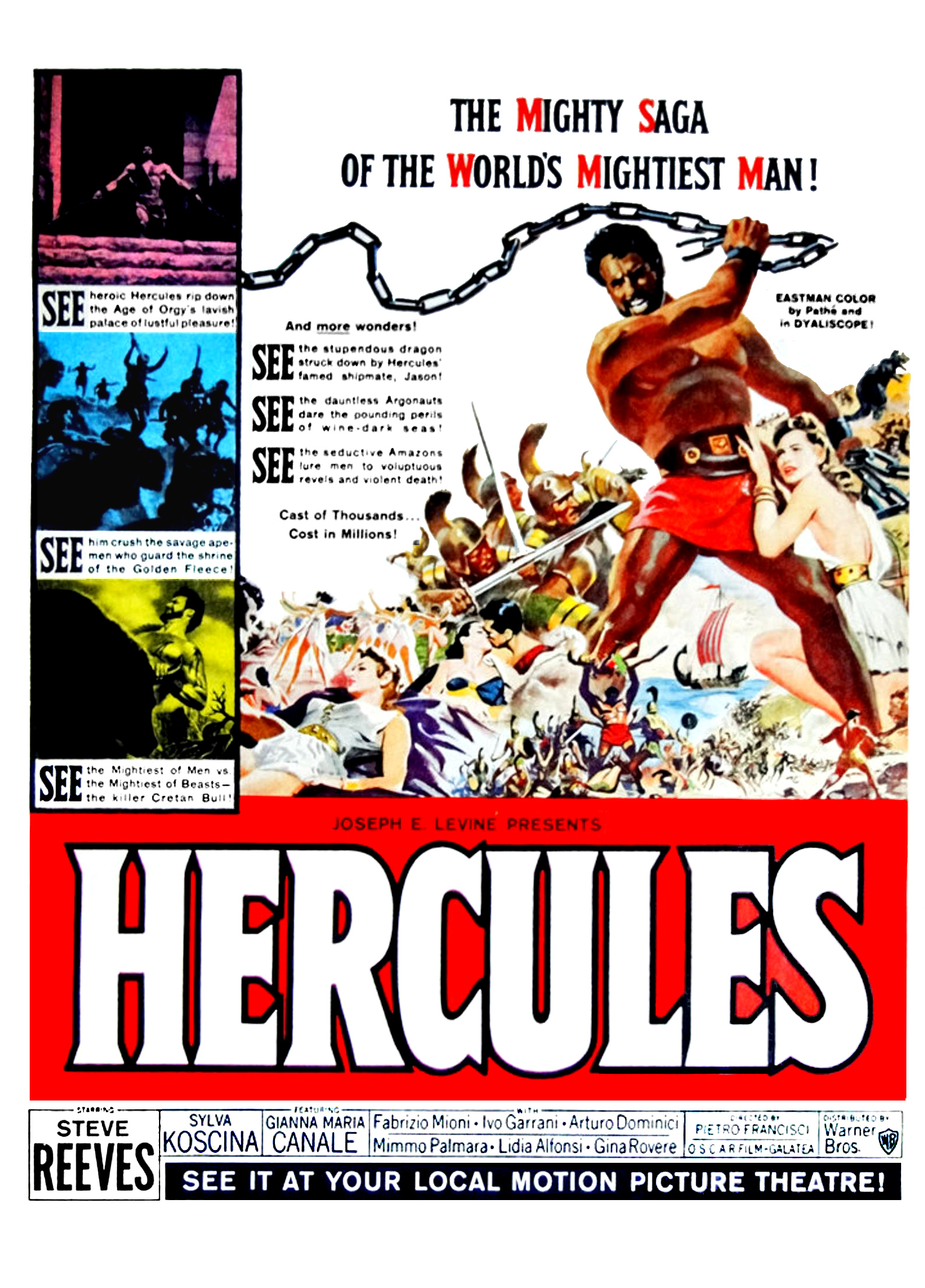
Hercules (1958), starring Steve Reeves

A series of nineteen Italian Hercules films of the "Sword and sandal" film genre were made in the late 1950s and early 1960s. The first and most successful of these was Hercules, starring Steve Reeves. Other actors who played Hercules in these films were Gordon Scott, Kirk Morris, Mickey Hargitay, Mark Forest, Alan Steel, Dan Vadis, Brad Harris, Reg Park, Peter Lupus (billed as Rock Stevens), and Michael Lane. The films are listed below by their American release titles, and the titles in parentheses are the original Italian titles with English translation.

- Hercules (Le fatiche di Ercole / The Labors of Hercules, 1958) starring Steve Reeves
- Hercules Unchained (Ercole e la regina di Lidia / Hercules and the Queen of Lydia, 1959) starring Steve Reeves
- Goliath and the Dragon (La vendetta di Ercole / The Revenge of Hercules, 1960) starring Mark Forest (The film had its title changed to Goliath when it was distributed in the U.S.)
- The Loves of Hercules (Gli amori di Ercole / Hercules vs the Hydra, 1960) co-starring Mickey Hargitay and Jayne Mansfield
- Hercules and the Captive Women (Ercole alla conquista di Atlantide / Hercules at the Conquest of Atlantis, 1961) starring Reg Park (alternate U.S. title: Hercules and the Haunted Women)
- Hercules in the Haunted World (Ercole al centro della terra / Hercules at the Center of the Earth, 1961) (directed by Mario Bava) starring Reg Park
- Hercules in the Valley of Woe (Maciste contro Ercole nella valle dei guai / Maciste vs Hercules in the Vale of Woe, 1961) starring Frank Gordon
- Ulysses Against the Son of Hercules (Ulisse contro Ercole / Ulysses vs Hercules, 1962) starring Mike Lane
- The Fury of Hercules (La furia di Ercole / The Fury of Hercules, 1962) starring Brad Harris (alternate U.S. title: The Fury of Samson)
- Hercules, Samson and Ulysses (Ercole sfida Sansone / Hercules Challenges Samson, 1963) starring Kirk Morris
- Hercules vs Moloch (Ercole contro Moloch / Hercules vs Molock, 1963) starring Gordon Scott (also known as The Conquest of Mycenae)
- Son of Hercules in the Land of Darkness (Ercole l'invincibile / Hercules the Invincible, 1964) starring Dan Vadis. The film was retitled "Son of Hercules" for inclusion in the U.S. syndicated television package The Sons of Hercules.
- Hercules vs The Giant Warriors (il trionfo di Ercole / The Triumph of Hercules, 1964) starring Dan Vadis (alternate U.S. title: Hercules and the Ten Avengers)
- Hercules Against Rome (Ercole contro Roma / Hercules vs Rome, 1964) starring Alan Steel
- Hercules Against the Sons of the Sun (Ercole contro i figli del sole / Hercules vs the Sons of the Sun, 1964) starring Mark Forest
- Samson and His Mighty Challenge (Ercole, Sansone, Maciste e Ursus: gli invincibili / Hercules, Samson, Maciste and Ursus: The Invincibles, 1964) starring Alan Steel as Hercules (also known as Combate dei Gigantes or Le Grand Defi)
- Hercules and the Tyrants of Babylon (Ercole contro i tiranni di Babilonia / Hercules vs the Tyrants of Babylon, 1964) starring Rock Stevens
- Hercules and the Princess of Troy (No Italian title) starring Gordon Scott, 1965 (also known as Hercules vs the Sea Monster) --- An U.S./Italian co-production, it was made as a pilot for a Charles Band-produced TV series that never materialized; it was later distributed as a feature film.
- Hercules the Avenger (Sfida dei giganti / Challenge of the Giants, 1965) starring Reg Park. The film was composed mostly of re-edited footage from the two 1961 Reg Park Hercules films.

Several English-dubbed Italian films, despite featuring the Hercules name in their title, were never intended to be Hercules films by their Italian creators.

- Hercules Against the Moon Men, Hercules Against the Barbarians, Hercules Against the Mongols and Hercules of the Desert were originally Maciste films in Italy. (See "Maciste" section below)
- Hercules and the Black Pirate and Hercules and the Treasure of the Incas were originally Samson films in Italy. (See "Samson" section below)
- Hercules, Prisoner of Evil was originally an Ursus film in Italy. (See "Ursus" section below)
- Hercules and the Masked Rider was originally a Goliath film in Italy. (See "Goliath" section below)

None of these films in their original Italian versions involved the Hercules character in any way. Likewise, most of the Sons of Hercules films shown on American TV in the 1960s had nothing to do with Hercules in their original Italian versions.

=== Other films ===
- The Warrior's Husband (1933), directed by Walter Lang, in which Hercules, played by Tiny Sandford, is a clumsy, cowardly, and comic character.
- The Popeye the Sailor cartoon Greek Mirthology portrays Popeye as Hercules.
- The Three Stooges Meet Hercules (1962), American comedy with the Three Stooges and Samson Burke playing Hercules.
- Jason and the Argonauts (1963) has Hercules as a member of crew of the Argo, searching for the golden fleece but leaving before they get there.
- Hercules (1964), Indian Hindi-language adventure film by Shriram in the style of the Italian peplums, starring Dara Singh in the titular role of the hero.
- Son of Hercules (1964), another Indian film in Hindi by Sultan. It follows the story of Hercules' son and his fight with a dragon.
- Tarzan Aur Hercules (1964), Indian Hindi-language action film by Mahmood, featuring a character based on Hercules who helps Tarzan win a princess.
- Sheba and Hercules (1967), Indian Hindi-language action film by B. S. Chowdhary. It features characters with allusions to Hercules and the Queen of Sheba.
- Hercules in New York (1970), with Arnold Schwarzenegger.
- Hercules (1983) and its sequel The Adventures of Hercules (1985) with Lou Ferrigno as the title character.
- Hercules and the Amazon Women (1994), with Kevin Sorbo.
- Hercules and the Lost Kingdom (1994), with Kevin Sorbo.
- Hercules and the Circle Fire (1994), with Kevin Sorbo.
- Hercules in the Underworld (1994), with Kevin Sorbo.
- Hercules in the Maze of the Minotaur (1994), with Kevin Sorbo.
- Hercules and Xena – The Animated Movie: The Battle for Mount Olympus (1998), voiced by Kevin Sorbo.
- Hercules (1997), American animated feature, produced by Walt Disney Feature Animation.
- The Amazing Feats of Young Hercules (1997), in which Hercules must complete four feats of heroism with his weasel companion Falina.
- Jason and the Argonauts (2000), in which Hercules (Brian Thompson) travels to Colchis with the Argonauts.
- Little Hercules (2009), Little Hercules travels from Mt. Olympus to live life as a mortal in Los Angeles played by Richard Sandrak.
- Immortals (2011), in which Heracles is one of the Olympian gods, played by Steve Byers.
- The Legend of Hercules (2014), directed by Renny Harlin and played by Kellan Lutz.
- Hercules (2014), directed by Brett Ratner and played by Dwayne Johnson. Based on the comic series by Steve Moore.
- Hercules Reborn (2014), directed by Nick Lyon and played by John Morrison.
- Thor: Love and Thunder (2022) directed by Taika Waititi, introduces Hercules into the MCU in the end-credits, played by Brett Goldstein.
- Young Hercules (1998), a prequel film to Hercules: The Legendary Journeys, with Ian Bohen as the title character.

== Television ==
- The Mighty Hercules, an animated series produced in 1963 by Adventure Cartoon Productions in connection with Trans-Lux Television.
- Space Sentinels (1977)
- The Freedom Force (TV Series) (1978)
- Hercules: The Legendary Journeys, a TV series and several made-for-television films in 1995–1999 starring Kevin Sorbo.
- Hercules: The Animated Series, a TV series based on the 1997 Disney film.
- Young Hercules, a spin-off of Hercules: The Legendary Journeys which aired on Fox Kids from September 12, 1998, to May 12, 1999, starring Ryan Gosling.
- Hercules (TV miniseries), a 2005 television mini-series done by Hallmark Entertainment.
- In Class of the Titans, Hercules is the mentor and ancestor of Herry Hercules.
- Hercules appears in the BBC One series Atlantis where he is portrayed by Mark Addy.
- Hercules appears in the ABC fantasy drama Once Upon a Time, portrayed by Jonathan Whitesell.
- Hercules appears in the animated series DuckTales reboot. This version of him is depicted as a stork.
- Hercules appears in WWF Superstars of Wrestling (1988 Weekly Television Show) This version of him is depicted as a slave.

== Video games and pinball ==
- Hercules (1979), Popularly considered to be the largest pinball machine made, Hercules was an oversized pinball machine released by Atari.
- The Return of Heracles (1983) is a video game designed by Stuart Smith and released for Atari 8-bit and Commodore 64 computers. It is a turn-based adventure RPG designed around the Twelve Labours of Heracles, with Pegasus and Achilles among the playable characters. Its design is similar to Smith's earlier game Ali Baba and the Forty Thieves.
- Hercules is the title character of the Hercules no Eikō series (1987-2008)
  - Glory of Heracles (2008), a video game for the Nintendo DS, in which the protagonist is a boy who lost his memories and is believed to be Heracles. Along his journey, he finds that others have also lost their memories and believe they are Heracles.
- Disney's Hercules (1997), based on the animated film of the same name.
  - A variation of the Disney version appears as a supporting character in the Kingdom Hearts series, appearing in Kingdom Hearts (2002) (voiced by Sean Astin), Kingdom Hearts: Chain of Memories (2004), Kingdom Hearts II (2005) (voiced by Tate Donovan), Kingdom Hearts 358/2 Days (2009), Kingdom Hearts: Birth by Sleep (2010) (voiced by Josh Keaton), Kingdom Hearts coded (2008), and Kingdom Hearts III (2019) (voiced by Tate Donovan).
- Herc's Adventures (1997) is a comedy adventure-role-playing video game on the PlayStation where the player must complete various tasks, several of which are not credited to Hercules anywhere else, such as killing Medusa.
- Hercules: The Legendary Journeys (2000), based upon the TV series of the same name. Released for Nintendo 64 and Game Boy Color. The game pits Hercules against his evil half-brother Ares.
- Empire Earth (2001) features a character named Hierakles in the first mission of the Greek campaign. He is the chieftain of an Anatolian tribe who must lead his people to Thessaly before the winter season sets in.
- Hercules, under the name Heracles, is a hero character in Age of Mythology (2002) and Age of Empires: Mythologies (2008) for the Nintendo DS.
- In the Japanese visual novel Fate/stay night (2004) as well as its anime adaptation, Heracles appears as the Berserker servant (voiced by Tadahisa Saizen), one of seven heroic spirits summoned to fight in the Holy Grail War. He has twelve lives to represent the twelve labors he underwent for immortality.
- Heracles: Battle with the Gods (2006) is a Nintendo DS and PlayStation 2 game where Heracles must free Pegasus from the clutches of his uncle, the evil god Poseidon.
- DragonFable (2006) by Artix Entertainment features a parody of the twelve labours in the form of a quest chain set by a chicken/cow god named Zeuster.
- Rise of the Argonauts (2008), a video game for the Xbox 360 and PlayStation 3. Hercules appears as one of Jason's Argonauts during the game, as a NPC party character.
- God of War III (2010), Hercules is a boss character and half-brother of the main character Kratos. He is portrayed as sinister and jealous of Kratos, believing that Kratos was Zeus' favored son and comparing Kratos' tasks to have been more intense than Hercules' Twelve Labours. Hercules fights Kratos to claim the throne as God of War, which was left vacant after Zeus stripped Kratos of his powers, declaring it his thirteenth unofficial and final labour. Hercules was voiced by Kevin Sorbo, who "reprised" the role from Hercules: The Legendary Journeys. Kratos himself has some similarities to Hercules, specifically performing tasks for the gods to gain atonement for killing his own family.
- God of War: Ascension (2013), Hercules appears in the multiplayer mode on the map Forum of Hercules, modeled after the location of the boss fight in God of War III. Hercules acts as an environmental obstacle for players, and is the final boss for the Trials of the Gods game mode. Kevin Sorbo reprised the role.
- Smite (2014), a video game in which he is known as the "Champion of Rome". He is depicted as a tall broad-shouldered man in his thirties with a tiny head and wielding a humongous club. He also has another appearance, called a 'skin', which allows players to battle as a buff Kevin Sorbo with a beard and make exaggerated jokes about sorbets.
- In the Assassin's Creed Odyssey DLC "The Fate of Atlantis: Torment of Hades" (2019), the protagonist fights Hercules armed with his club in Tartarus.
- In Civilization VI, Hercules appears as a summonable hero in the Heroes and Legends game mode.

== Books ==
- In the Percy Jackson & the Olympians series by Rick Riordan, Hercules is portrayed negatively in The Titan's Curse, receiving help in getting the Golden Apples but giving no credit to his helpmate, Zoe Nightshade. He reappears as a minor antagonist in The Heroes of Olympus: The Mark of Athena.
- In author Kevin Given's novel Last Rites: The Return of Sebastian Vasilis, Thor/Hercules is an immortal who was struck by lightning several times and is now a special needs immortal who refers to himself as "The Greek god Thor." While in ancient Greece, he was revered as Heracles, but in Norway was worshipped as the thunder god, leading to his confusion about the past.
- In Henry Lion Oldie's Achaean Cycle, Heracles, along with his brother Iphicles, is the protagonist of "A Hero Must Be Alone". The novel omits his labours and focuses on Amphitryon's rivalry with Zeus, which motivates him to raise both Heracles and Iphicles equally heroic, despite having to falsely admit that Heracles is Zeus's son. Heracles (or Iphicles, which is left unclear) also appears in Oldie's "Odysseus Son of Laertes".
- In Agatha Christie's The Labours of Hercules the eponymous Hercule Poirot carefully selects cases to reflect the Greek mythological sequence. The cases have varying levels of conformity to the mythological labours, and were first published as short stories in Strand Magazine in the UK from 1939-1940 (excluding The Capture of Cerberus) before being collected into a single volume in 1947.

== Comic books ==
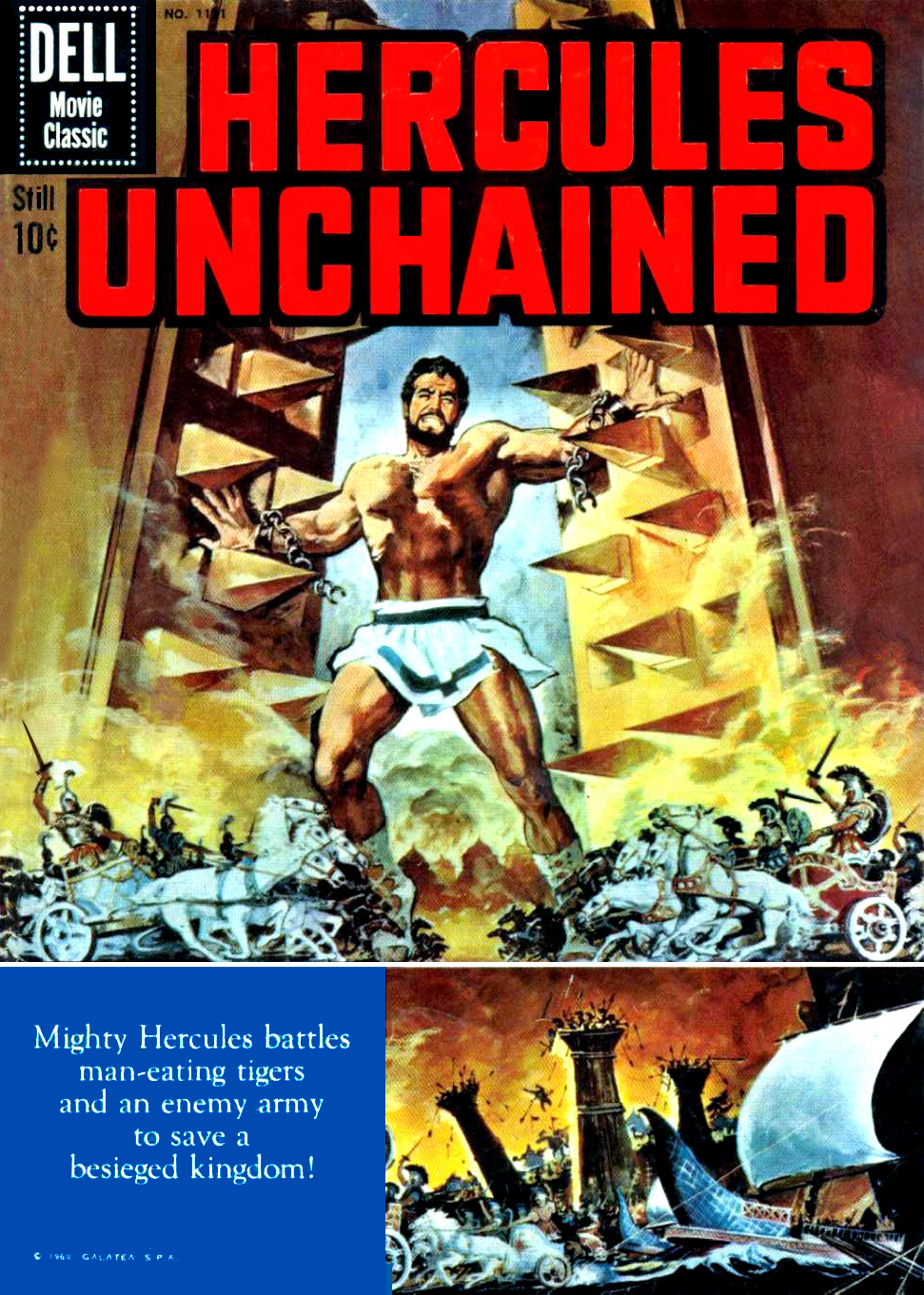
Cover of Hercules Unchained, (Four Color Comics, no. 1121, Dell, August 1960).

- Hercules, a 1941 DC Comics appearance in the first Wonder Woman story
- Hercules, a 1958 Dell comic adapting the film from the same year
  - Hercules Unchained, a 1959 Dell comic adapting the sequel to the 1958 film
- The Mighty Hercules, a 1963 Gold Key comic based on the animated series of the same name
- Journey into Mystery Annual #1, a 1965 Marvel Comics comic which featured the debut of Hercules, a character who appeared in many other titles, including his own series
- Hercules: Adventures of the Man-God, a 1967 Charlton comic
- Hercules: The Legendary Journeys, a 1996 Topps comic based on the TV series of the same name
- Hercules, a 2008 Radical comic by Steve Moore

== Manga and anime ==
- In the manga One Piece, the character Kozuki Oden has similarities to Heracles. They both possessed tremendous strength since infancy and had numerous affairs with women. Some of Oden's actions are based on the Twelve Labors of Heracles:
1. Oden defeating the Mountain God is based on the fourth labor, the capture of the Erymanthian Boar.
2. Oden's attempt to help the Flower Capital citizens during a great drought by diverting a river to the city is based on the fifth labor, cleaning the Augean stables in a single day. Unlike Heracles, Oden's action ended in disaster.
3. Both were rejected and disowned by one of their family members; Heracles' nemesis was Hera, and Oden was disowned by his father, Kozuki Sukiyaki.
4. Both were sailors; Heracles was part of the Argonauts, and Oden sailed with the Whitebeard Pirates and Roger Pirates.
5. Both had fathers who were rulers of their respective domains; Heracles's father was Zeus, King and ruler of Olympus, and Oden's father was the head of the Kozuki family and shogun of Wano.
- In the Shuumatsu no Valkirye manga and anime, Hercules is the fourth combatant to fight Jack the Ripper. This version was originally human, until he drank the blood of Zeus and became a god. He is a defender of justice and humanity, who is respected and loved by human gods.

== Music ==
- Ercole amante (Hercules in Love) is an opera in five acts composed in 1660 by Francesco Cavalli.
- Hercules (Handel) is a musical drama composed in 1744 by George Frideric Handel.
- The Choice of Hercules (Handel) is an oratorio in three acts composed in 1750 by Handel.
- Hercule mourant (Hercules Dying) is a tragédie en musique in five acts composed in 1761 by Antoine Dauvergne.
- Hercules and Omphale or The Power of Love is a "classical extravaganza" which premiered at Royal St. James's Theatre in London on 26 December 1864. Written by William Brough, with music composed and arranged by Wallerstein, the piece was directed by Charles Matthews.
- "Hercules and his gifts" are mentioned in "Something Just Like This" by The Chainsmokers and Coldplay.
- Hercules (musical) is a 2019 broadway musical based on the 1997 Disney animated film.
- Hercules is mentioned in the song "Surface Pressure", performed by Jessica Darrow, in Disney's Encanto, when Luisa says "Was Hercules ever like 'Yo I don't want to fight Cerberus'".

== See also ==
- Maciste
- Lockheed C-130, a military transport aircraft also named Hercules
- 5143 Heracles, a binary asteroid
- Death Battle, in which the god of strength Heracles faces the Victorious Fighting Buddha Sun Wukong.
