= Felicitas (disambiguation) =

Felicitas is a Roman goddess.

Felicitas may also refer to:

== People ==
- Felicitas (martyr), early 3rd-century co-martyr of Saint Perpetua
- Felicitas of Padua, ninth-century saint
- Felicitas of Rome (Felicity of Rome), saint and martyr, said to be martyred with her seven sons
- Felicitas Becker, professor of African history
- Dame Felicitas Corrigan
- Felicitas Goodman, Mexican anthropologist

== Other ==
- Felicitas (film), an Argentine film
- 109 Felicitas, a main belt asteroid
- MV Felicitas II (1938), a Panamanian cargo ship

== See also ==
- Santa Felicita di Firenze, the second-oldest church in Florence
- Felicita (disambiguation)
- Felicità (disambiguation)
- Felicity (disambiguation)
- Felicito (disambiguation)
- Felicia (disambiguation)
- Felix (disambiguation)
