= Felix =

Felix or St Felix may refer to:

== Arts and entertainment ==
=== Film and television ===
- Felix (1921 film), a Norwegian silent drama film
- Felix (1996 film), a Slovene film
- Felix Media, an Australian film production company

=== Music ===
- Felix (band), a British band
- Felix (music producer), British DJ
- Felix (rapper) (born 2000), Australian rapper and member of the K-pop boy band Stray Kids
- Félix Award, a Quebec music award named after Félix Leclerc

=== Sculpture ===
- Venus Felix (sculpture), a sculpture of Venus and her son Cupid

== Business ==
- AB Felix, a Swedish food company
- Felix (pet food), a brand of cat food sold in most European countries
- Felix Airways, an airline based in Yemen
- Felix Bus Services of Derbyshire, England

== People ==
- Felix (name), people and fictional characters with the name Felix

== Places ==
=== Canada ===
- Felix, Ontario, an unincorporated place and railway point in Northeastern Ontario, Canada
- St. Felix, Prince Edward Island, a rural community in Prince County, Prince Edward Island, Canada

=== United States ===
- Felix, California, an unincorporated community in Calaveras County
- Felix Township, Grundy County, Illinois
- Felix Township, Grundy County, Iowa

=== Other places ===
- Arabia Felix, the ancient Latin name of Yemen
- Felix, Spain, a municipality of the province Almería, in the autonomous community of Andalusia, Spain

== Science and technology ==
- 1664 Felix, an asteroid
- Apache Felix, an open source OSGi framework by Apache Software Foundation
- FELIX (experiment), a Roger Penrose proposal for evaluating whether macroscopic systems can be in superposition states
- Felix (Hewlett-Packard), a codename for the HP 200LX palmtop PC
- Free-electron laser for infrared experiments (FELIX), a type of laser

== Warfare ==
- Dieter Gerhardt (born 1935), South African navy commander convicted of treason, code named Felix
- Legio IV Flavia Felix, a Roman legion
- Operation Felix, a German World War II project to conquer Gibraltar
- VB-6 Felix, an infrared-guided bomb

== Other uses ==
- Felix (newspaper), the weekly students' newspaper of Imperial College, London
- Felix (ship, 1993), a passenger ship operating on Lake Zurich in Switzerland
- Hurricane Felix (disambiguation), various storms

== See also ==
- Felix the Cat (disambiguation)
- St. Felix's flood, a flood disaster that struck the Netherlands in 1530
- Saint-Félix (disambiguation), the name or part of the name of several communes in France
- St Felix Catholic Primary School Bankstown
- San Félix (disambiguation), the name of two places in South America
- Church of St. Felix (disambiguation)
- Felicia (disambiguation)
- Felicity (disambiguation)
