= Felix the Cat (disambiguation) =

Felix the Cat is a cartoon character created in the silent era by Pat Sullivan and Otto Messmer.

Felix the Cat may also refer to:

- Felix the Cat (TV series), the 1950s TV series created by Joe Oriolo featuring Felix
  - Felix the Cat: The Movie, a 1988 film based on the classic cartoon and TV series
  - Felix the Cat (video game), a 1992 video game based on the cartoon
  - Felix the Cat (mascot), the oldest high school mascot in Indiana, for Logansport High School

== People ==
- Félix Potvin or Félix "the Cat" Potvin (born 1971), retired NHL goaltender
- Felix da Housecat (born 1971), American DJ

== Animals ==
- Félicette, nicknamed Félix by the media, the first cat to be launched into space

== See also ==
- Felix the Cat's Cartoon Toolbox, a 1994 computer application, including characters from the TV show
- The Twisted Tales of Felix the Cat, a 1995 TV series developed by Don Oriolo
  - Baby Felix, a 2000 animated series featuring infant versions of the TV characters
