= Felicito =

Felicito may refer to:

== People ==
- Felicito Araneta (19th century), Philippine, member of the Araneta family
- Felicito Ávila, Honduran politician
- Felicito Payumo (1937-2025), Philippine businessman
- Felicito Hupan Tiu (born 1955), Philippine businessman
- Lt.Gen. Felicito Virgilio M. Trinidad Jr. AFP, former commander of the AFP Northern Luzon Command

== Other uses ==
- "Felicito" (song), a 1988 song by Los Bukis off the album Si Me Recuerdas

== See also ==
- Felícitos Villarreal (20th century), Mexican banker; see Secretariat of Finance and Public Credit
- Te Felicito (disambiguation)
- Felicitas (disambiguation)
- Felicity (disambiguation)
- Felicia (disambiguation)
- Felix (disambiguation)
