= Saint-Félix =

Saint-Félix may refer to:

== People ==
- Saint: see Saint Felix
- Armand de Saint-Félix, French Navy officer of the 18th century

== Places ==
=== Canada ===
- Saint-Félix-de-Dalquier, Abitibi, Québec
- Saint-Félix-de-Kingsey, a municipality in Centre-du-Québec, Québec
- Saint-Félix-de-Valois, a municipality in Lanaudière, Québec
- Saint-Félix-d'Otis, a municipality in Saguenay, Québec
- St. Felix, Prince Edward Island, Prince County, Prince Edward Island

=== France ===
- Saint-Félix, Allier, in the Allier département
- Saint-Félix, Charente, in the Charente département
- Saint-Félix, Charente-Maritime, in the Charente-Maritime département
- Saint-Félix, Lot, in the Lot département
- Saint-Félix, Oise, in the Oise département
- Saint-Félix, Haute-Savoie, in the Haute-Savoie département
- Saint-Félix-de-Bourdeilles, in the Dordogne département
- Saint-Félix-de-Foncaude, in the Gironde département
- Saint-Félix-de-l'Héras, in the Hérault département
- Saint-Félix-de-Lodez, in the Hérault département
- Saint-Félix-de-Lunel, in the Aveyron département
- Saint-Félix-de-Pallières, in the Gard département
- Saint-Félix-de-Reillac-et-Mortemart, in the Dordogne département
- Saint-Félix-de-Rieutord, in the Ariège département
- Saint-Félix-de-Sorgues, in the Aveyron département
- Saint-Félix-de-Tournegat, in the Ariège département
- Saint-Félix-de-Villadeix, in the Dordogne département
- Saint-Félix-Lauragais, in the Haute-Garonne département

=== Haiti ===
- Saint-Felix, Torbeck, Haiti

== See also ==
- São Félix (disambiguation)
- Felix (disambiguation)
