= Felicity =

Felicity may refer to:

== Places ==
- Felicity, California, United States, an unincorporated community
- Felicity, Ohio, United States, a village
- Felicity, Trinidad and Tobago, a community in Chaguanas

== Entertainment ==
- Felicity (TV series), an American drama
- Felicity (film), a 1979 Australian sexploitation film
- Felicity: An American Girl Adventure, a 2005 TV movie

== Other uses ==
- Happiness, a synonym for felicity
- Felicity (given name), a list of people and fictional characters
- Felicity (pragmatics), a term used in formal semantics and pragmatics
- Felicity Party, an Islamist Turkish political party founded in 2001
- Felicity Plantation, a historic sugar plantation in Louisiana, United States
- HMS Felicity (J369), a Royal Navy Second World War minesweeper
- Felicity, an 18th-century British privateer which captured HMS Experiment
- Felicity, the main character of the animated series Rainbow Butterfly Unicorn Kitty.

== See also ==
- Felicitas (disambiguation)
- Felicito (disambiguation)
- Felicia (disambiguation)
- Felix (disambiguation)
