= Te Felicito =

Te Felicito may refer to:

- "Te Felicito" (Grupo Mojado song), 1992
- "Te Felicito" (Shakira and Rauw Alejandro song), 2022

== See also ==
- Felicito (disambiguation)
