= Felicità (disambiguation) =

"Felicità" is a 1982 song by Italian–American duo Al Bano and Romina Power.

Felicità may also refer to:

- Felicità (album), a 1982 studio album by Italian–American duo Al Bano and Romina Power
- Felicità (film), a 2023 Italian comedy-drama film co-written and directed by Micaela Ramazzotti
- Felicità (TV series), a 2026 Polish-Italian TV series
- Felicità tà tà, a 1974 studio album by Italian singer and actress Raffaella Carrà
- Treni della felicità, a post-war initiative by the Italian Communist Party and the Unione donne italiane

== See also ==
- Felicita (disambiguation)
- Felicitas (disambiguation)
