= The Twisted Tales of Felix the Cat =

American animated television series

- Genre: Surreal comedy
- Created by: Pat Sullivan; Otto Messmer; Joe Oriolo (characters)
- Directed by: Lynne Naylor; Milton Knight; Doug Lawrence; Timothy Björklund; Jim Coane
- Creative director: Timothy Björklund
- Voices of: Thom Adcox-Hernandez (season 1); Charlie Adler (season 2); Phil Hayes; Jennifer Hale; Cree Summer; Susan Silo
- Theme music composer: Don Oriolo; Nathan Wang
- Opening theme: "The Twisted Tales of Felix the Cat"
- Composers: Club Foot Orchestra (season 1); Nathan Wang (season 2)
- Country of origin: United States
- Original language: English
- No. of seasons: 2
- No. of episodes: 21 (58 segments) (list of episodes)

Production
- Executive producers: Don Oriolo; Phil Roman
- Producers: Timothy Björklund; Craig Kellman (season 2)
- Running time: 22 minutes (7–11 minutes per segment)
- Production companies: Felix the Cat Productions; Film Roman; HIT Entertainment; Taurus Film GmbH & Co.; Televisión Española

Original release
- Network: CBS
- Release: September 16, 1995 – April 12, 1997

Related
- Felix the Cat (1958–1961); Baby Felix (2000–2001)

The Twisted Tales of Felix the Cat is an American animated television series produced by Film Roman. The series first aired on September 16, 1995 on CBS Saturday mornings lasting for two seasons with the final episode airing on April 12, 1997. The first season consists of 13 episodes and the second and final season consists of 8 episodes.

This is the second television series featuring Felix the Cat; the first was the 1958–1960 series Felix the Cat.

== History ==
The show was a modern take of the original 1958–1960 series produced by Otto Messmer's former assistant, Joe Oriolo. His son, Don Oriolo, was involved in the creation of this series as well.

In many ways, the show reverts to the silent era of shorts with surreal settings and offbeat character depictions. Felix is also more like his original mischievous adult form, rather than the young and innocent depiction from the 1936 Van Beuren shorts, the 1959 TV series and Felix the Cat: The Movie. It does, however, contain some elements from the 1950s series such as Felix's Magic Bag of Tricks and the characters Poindexter, the Master Cylinder, the Professor and Rock Bottom (though the latter two are actually parodies of the original characters, with their names being the Mad Doctor and Lead Fanny, respectively). The series had a Fleischer Studios-inspired art style.

The series starred Thom Adcox-Hernandez as the voice of Felix the Cat, but since Adcox-Hernandez's voice was apparently a temporary role while the producers kept looking for a more suitable actor by the first season's run, he was replaced by Charlie Adler in Season 2. It was produced by Phil Roman and Timothy Berglund and is reputed to have been one of the most expensive cartoons ever made by Film Roman. Martin Olson and Jeremy Kramer, two comedy writers known for pushing the envelope into the bizarre, wrote both outlines and scripts for the series. The main theme was composed by Don Oriolo, while the musical score and closing theme were composed and performed by the Club Foot Orchestra.

== Characters ==
Felix the Cat: The main character and star of the show. He has many adventures with his magic bag of tricks that often helps in dangerous situations. Unlike his original counterpart, he is shown to be a pre-teen cat who has a cute personality (voiced by Thom Adcox-Hernandez in season 1 and Charlie Adler in season 2).

=== Allies ===
- Rosco (voiced by Phil Hayes) – Felix's dim-witted best friend.
- Candy Kitty (voiced by Jennifer Hale) – Rosco's older sister and Felix's love interest.
- Sheba Beboporeba (voiced by Cree Summer) – Felix's friend.
- Shamus H. Goldcrow (voiced by Tony Pope) – an anthropomorphic crow detective.
- Skiddoo the Mouse (voiced by Susan Silo in season 1 and Kevin Schon in season 2) – one of Felix's friends.
- Bermuda Triangle (voiced by Pat Fraley) - He is an anthropomorphic version of the location of the same name. He wreaks havoc because of his stupidity. He caused all sorts of chaos in New York City until he fell in love with Times Square. The two ended up getting married.
- Nastassia Slinky (voiced by Jane Singer) – an actress who Felix is obsessed with. She however, never returns the feelings. In fact, she hates Felix and wants nothing to do with him, not showing him even the slightest grip of affection. She has a mother, who is also an actress.
- Poindexter (voiced by Cam Clarke) - He is the nerdy young nephew of the Professor and is Felix's other best friend. He is depicted as a stereotypical scientist; he is very intelligent and always wears thick Coke-bottle glasses, a lab coat, and a mortarboard. A button on the chest of his lab coat acts as a control for whatever device the plot calls for. Whenever he talks to Felix, he refers to him as "Mr. Felix".
- Fats Holler (voiced by John Byner)
- Guardian Angel (voiced by Jeff Bennett)

=== Villains ===
- Peeking Duck (voiced by Tony Jay) – an evil duck magician who wants to steal Felix's bag for its magic.
  - Moo Shoo and One-Ton (voiced by Kevin Schon and Jim Cummings) – Peeking Duck's chicken henchmen.
- The Sludge King (voiced by Townsend Coleman)
- Fufu Gauche (voiced by Brad Garrett) – a disgraced fashion designer who tries to get revenge on the city by replacing everyone's clothes with his tacky fish costumes.
- Oscar (voiced by Jeffrey Tambor) – a minor villain whose sole appearance was in the episode "Phoney Phelix", serving as one of the most pathetic foes Felix has ever faced. A wannabe cartoon star who met failure at every step of the way, Oscar sought to climb his way to stardom by hijacking Felix's own cartoon, despite being a painfully obvious impersonator.
- Fuzzy Bunny (voiced by Jeff Bennett) – a cutesy toy rabbit who manages to replace Felix's own show and become a nationwide sensation, thanks to how cute he is. In truth however, he is actually a gruesome thug in a rabbit suit.
  - Froggy (voiced by Jeff Bennett) – Fuzzy Bunny's henchman.
- Bet a Billion Bill (voiced by Buster Jones) – a smooth-talking and arrogant hotshot playboy gambler.
- Captain Herman (voiced by Tom Kenny)
- Mad Doctor (voiced by Pat Fraley) - He is a parody of the Professor from the 1958–60 Felix the Cat series.
- Leadfanny (voiced by Billy West) - He is a parody of Rock Bottom from the 1958–60 Felix the Cat series. He is a stereotypically gay dog whose voice is an imitation of actor Harvey Fierstein. Leadfanny is Mad Doctor's assistant.
- Black Cats Leader (voiced by Greg Burson)

== Cast ==
- Thom Adcox-Hernandez – Felix the Cat (season 1)
- Charlie Adler – Felix the Cat (season 2), additional voices
- Jeff Bennett – Froggy, Fuzzy Bunny, additional voices
- Mary Kay Bergman – Mermaid, additional voices
- Greg Burson – Black Cats Leader, additional voices
- Cam Clarke – Poindexter, additional voices
- Townsend Coleman – Sludge King, additional voices
- Jim Cummings – One-Ton, additional voices
- Jennifer Darling – Additional voices
- Debi Derryberry – Additional voices
- Jeannie Elias – Additional voices
- Patrick Fraley – Mad Doctor, additional voices
- Brad Garrett – Fufu Gauche, additional voices
- Michael Gough – Additional voices
- Jennifer Hale – Candy Kitty, additional voices
- Jess Harnell – Patties, Building, additional voices
- Phil Hayes – Rosco, additional voices
- Tony Jay – Peking Duck, additional voices
- Tom Kane – Birthdayland Announcer, additional voices
- Tom Kenny – Captain Herman, additional voices
- Maurice LaMarche – Additional voices
- Mr. Lawrence – Additional voices
- Pat Musick – Woman Customer, additional voices
- Gary Owens – Radio Announcer, additional voices
- Rob Paulsen – additional voices
- Patrick Pinney – additional voices
- Tony Pope – Shamus T. Goldcrow, additional voices
- Roger Rose – Additional voices
- Kevin Schon – Moo Shoo, additional voices
- Roger Scott – Additional voices
- Susan Silo – Skiddoo the Mouse, additional voices
- Jane Singer – Nastassia Slinky
- Cree Summer – Sheba Beboporeba, additional voices
- Jeffrey Tambor – Oscar
- Frank Welker – Additional voices
- Billy West – LeadFanny, additional voices

== Crew ==
- Susan Blu – Voice director (season 1, ep. 18, ep. 19, ep. 20)
- Mark Evanier – Story editor (season 2), Voice director (ep. 14, ep. 15)
- Craig Kellman – Producer (season 2), Voice director (ep. 16, ep. 17, ep. 21)

== Home media ==
Some of the episodes were released on VHS and DVD by BMG Video in North America, and several DVD releases of episodes were available in Hong Kong under the title "The Twisted Tales of Felix the Cat II". A 3-DVD box set of the entire series was released on April 26, 2013, exclusively in Germany, containing 21 episodes or 58 individual segments, this release being the first complete collection with an English soundtrack. As of 2020, the series is available to stream on the NBCUniversal streaming service, Peacock.

== Episodes ==
Season	Segments	Episodes	Originally released	
Season	Segments	Episodes	First released	Last released
1	34	13	September 16, 1995	January 6, 1996
2	24	8	September 14, 1996	April 12, 1997

=== Season 1 (1995–96) ===
No. overall	No. in season	Title	Directed by	Written by	Original release date
1a	1a	"Guardian Idiot"	Dominic Polcino	Martin Olson, Dominic Polcino, Christopher Moeller, and Timothy Berglund; Story by : Martin Olson	September 16, 1995
Felix is captured by the owner of Gut Bombs, who wishes to grind him into meat for his customers. A guardian angel is sent to rescue Felix, but ends up putting him in more trouble.
1b	1b	"Space Time Twister"	Lynne Naylor	Martin Olson, Lynne Naylor, Stephan DeStefano, and Timothy Berglund; Story by : Martin Olson	September 16, 1995
When Felix takes the wrong train in the subway, he encounters the Time Twister and his magic box, which can control time and space. Chaos ensues when Felix decides to steal the box.
1c	1c	"Don't String Me Along"	Robin Steele	Jeremy Kramer, Robin Steele, Christian Roman, and Timothy Berglund; Story by : Jeremy Kramer	September 16, 1995
After Felix's vacuum cleaner quits cleaning up the mess in his house, our feline hero takes it up himself to do the tidying. When he encounters a loose string and pulls it off, he finds himself unraveling all sorts of things around the world.
2a	2a	"The Sludge King"	Timothy Berglund	Martin Olson and Timothy Berglund (Also Story)	September 23, 1995
2b	2b	"The Sludge King"	Timothy Berglund	Martin Olson and Timothy Berglund (Also Story)	September 23, 1995
In this two-parter, Felix meets Rosco's sister Candy on the Big Deal Animation Studios. When the three head out for lunch, Rosco's donut falls into the sewer, and when he tries to catch it, he gets kidnapped by the eponymous Sludge King, and it is up to Felix to save him.
2c	2c	"Mars Needs Felix"	Milton Knight	Jeremy Kramer, Milton Knight, and Michael Polcino; Story by : Jeremy Kramer	September 23, 1995
While desperate to find something to eat, Felix is tricked into taking a trip to Mars where he is forced to take on slave labour by the locals.
3a	3a	"Step Right Up"	Dominic Polcino	Jeremy Kramer, Dominic Polcino, and Chris Moeller; Story by : Jeremy Kramer	September 30, 1995
This episode introduces recurring villain Peking Duck and his henchmen, Moo-Shoo and Two-Ton. The villainous trio tries to steal Felix's Magic Bag of Tricks in a carnival.
3b	3b	"Now Playing – Felix"	Lynne Naylor	Jeremy Kramer, Lynne Naylor, and Stephan DeStefano; Story by : Jeremy Kramer and Timothy Berglund	September 30, 1995
When Felix goes to watch the premiere of a movie starring his favorite actress Nastassia Slinky, he accidentally finds himself inside the movie, and he's now craving to steal a kiss from the main star.
3c	3c	"Jailhouse Shock"	Phil "Wild Brain" Robinson	Jeremy Kramer, Phil Robinson, Bob Koch, and Timothy Björklund; Story by : Jeremy Kramer and Timothy Björklund	September 30, 1995
Felix and Rosco are apprehended by a jailhouse where everyone is insane, and must find a way to break out.
4a	4a	"The Manhattan Triangle"	Blair Peters	Martin Olson; Story by : Martin Olson and Timothy Berglund	October 7, 1995
The Bermuda Triangle comes to life and travels to Manhattan, where it causes the laws of physics and logic to fall apart, right during Felix's first date with Candy.
4b	4b	"The Petrified Cheese"	Chris Bartleman	Martin Olson; Story by : Martin Olson and Timothy Berglund	October 7, 1995
Detective Shamus T. Goldcrow narrates a story about trying to solve a case without his disappeared sidekick, and enlists Felix to help.
5a	5a	"Middle Aged Felix"	Pamela "Spam" Stalker	Timothy Björklund, Pamela Stalker, and Susan Crossley; Story by : Jeremy Kramer and Timothy Björklund	October 14, 1995
Felix and Sheba find a spell book in the latter's grandma's garage, which transports them to the middle ages, but the magician recognizes said book and wants it back.
5b	5b	"Felix in Psychedelicland"	Robin Steele	Martin Olson, Robin Steele, Christian Roman, and Timothy Berglund; Story by : Martin Olson and Timothy Berglund	October 14, 1995
Felix and Sheba travel to Pittsburgh to attend a haunted Rock N Roll museum. When Sheba is trapped in a giant jukebox, Felix must come to her rescue.
6a	6a	"Order of the Black Cats"	Dominic Polcino	Jeremy Kramer, Dominic Polcino, and Chris Moeller; Story by : Jeremy Kramer	October 28, 1995
On Halloween night, Felix is dragged into a cult of multiple people wearing black cat costumes, in which they do not realize he is a real cat.
6b	6b	"Now Boarding"	John Stevenson	Jeremy Kramer, John Stevenson, and Timothy Berglund; Story by : Jeremy Kramer	October 28, 1995
Felix and Sheba are trapped in a board game after the latter states that she finds it boring, and they must reach the finish line in one piece.
6c	6c	"Felix Breaks the Bank"	Lynne Naylor	Jeremy Kramer, Lynne Naylor, and Stephan DeStefano; Story by : Jeremy Kramer	October 28, 1995
It is Candy's birthday and Felix needs money to buy her a present, but when he fails to break open his piggy bank, he imagines Candy leaving him for someone richer.
7a	7a	"Noah's Nightclub"	Robin Steele	Martin Olson, Robin Steele, Timothy Berglund, and Christian Roman	November 4, 1995
Felix attends a nightclub that is themed after Noah's Ark, including the heavy rain.
7b	7b	"Felix's Gold Score"	Milton Knight	Jeremy Kramer, Milton Knight, and Michael Polcino; Story by : Jeremy Kramer	November 4, 1995
During the gold rush, Felix must protect all the gold he has mined from bandits.
7c	7c	"Forever Rafter"	Milton Knight	Jeremy Kramer, Milton Knight, and Michael Polcino; Story by : Jeremy Kramer	November 4, 1995
Felix takes Sheba to watch a game of the New York Giants on her birthday, but a sudden flood might drown their plans.
8a	8a	"The Earth Heist"	Blair Peters	Martin Olson, Blair Peters, and Timothy Berglund; Story by : Martin Olson	November 11, 1995
While Felix is exploring outer space, he sees that the Earth has been stolen by velcro-obsessed aliens and must find a way to retrieve it.
8b	8b	"Attack of the Tacky"	Chris Bartleman	Martin Olson, Jeremy Kramer, Chris Bartleman, and Timothy Berglund; Story by : Martin Olson and Jeremy Kramer	November 11, 1995
Detective Goldcrow and Felix investigate a case where a crazy fashion designer replaces everyone's clothes with ridiculous fish costumes.
9a	9a	"Felix in Nightdrop Land"	Jim Schumann	Martin Olson, Larry Swerdlove, Jim Schumann, and Timothy Berglund; Story by : Martin Olson and Timothy Berglund	November 18, 1995
When Felix tries to sleep inside of a video rental store, he ends up inside some of the movies after he gets swallowed by a VCR. Note: This episode uses real-life film footage for Felix to be trapped in, such as The Beach Girls and the Monster and Gorgo.
9b	9b	"Shocking Story"	Doug Lawrence	Martin Olson, Doug Lawrence, and Timothy Berglund; Story by : Martin Olson	November 18, 1995
Felix must help an anthropomorphic lightning bolt return to the sky during a storm.
10a	10a	"Love at First Slice"	Lynne Naylor	Martin Olson, Lynne Naylor, and Stephan DeStefano; Story by : Martin Olson	December 2, 1995
10b	10b	"Space Case"	Craig Handley	Martin Olson, Craig Handley, and Timothy Berglund; Story by : Martin Olson	December 2, 1995
10c	10c	"Peg Leg Felix"	Phil "Wild Brain" Robinson	Martin Olson, Phil Robinson, and Bob Koch; Story by : Martin Olson	December 2, 1995
11a	11a	"Shell Shock"	Blair Peters	Martin Olson, Blair Peters, and Timothy Björklund; Story by : Martin Olson	December 9, 1995
11b	11b	"The Big Hunt"	Blair Peters	Jeremy Kramer, Blair Peters, and Timothy Berglund; Story by : Jeremy Kramer	December 9, 1995
12a	12a	"Felix's Big Splash"	Chris Moeller and Christian Roman	Jeremy Kramer, Christopher Moeller, and Christian Roman; Story by : Jeremy Kramer	December 16, 1995
12b	12b	"Gross Ghost"	Milton Knight	Martin Olson and Milton Knight; Story by : Martin Olson	December 16, 1995
12c	12c	"Swedish Meatballs"	Brian Sheesley	Martin Olson, Brian Sheesley, Eric Keyes, and Timothy Björklund; Story by : Martin Olson	December 16, 1995
13a	13a	"Wet Paint"	Timothy Berglund	Martin Olson and Timothy Berglund; Story by : Martin Olson	January 6, 1996
13b	13b	"News Blues"	Blair Peters	Jeremy Kramer, Martin Olson, and Blair Peters; Story by : Jeremy Kramer	January 6, 1996
13c	13c	"Copycat"	Paul Vester	Michael Ouweleen and Paul Vester; Story by : Michael Ouweleen	January 6, 1996

=== Season 2 (1996–97) ===
No. overall	No. in season	Title	Directed by	Written by	Original release date
14a	1a	"Surreal Estate"	Doug Lawrence	Mark Evanier and Doug Lawrence	September 14, 1996
14b	1b	"Phony Phelix"	Chris Moeller	Mark Evanier	September 14, 1996
Felix is kidnapped and impersonated by an impossibly stupid and flaccid imposter, Oscar, and has to put a stop to his antics.
14c	1c	"The Five Minute Meatball"	Russell Crispin	Mark Evanier and Russell Crispin	September 14, 1996
15a	2a	"Bet a Billion Bill"	Craig Kellman	Mark Evanier and Craig Kellman	September 21, 1996
15b	2b	"Background Details"	Pat Shinagawa	Mark Evanier	September 21, 1996
15c	2c	"Viva Lost Wages"	Russell Crispin	Mark Evanier and Russell Crispin	September 21, 1996
16a	3a	"The Punderground"	David Preston	Mark Evanier	September 28, 1996
16b	3b	"Nightmare on Oak Street"	Chris Moeller	Mark Evanier and Chris Moeller	September 28, 1996
16c	3c	"Star Trash"	Christian Roman	Mark Evanier, Christian Roman, and Craig Kellman	September 28, 1996
17a	4a	"The Fuzzy Bunny Show"	Brett Varon	Mark Evanier, Brett Varon, and Craig Kellman	October 12, 1996
17b	4b	"The Fuzzy Bunny Show"	Brett Varon	Mark Evanier, Brett Varon, and Craig Kellman	October 12, 1996
17c	4c	"The Milky Way"	Pete Michels	Mark Evanier and Pete Michels	October 12, 1996
18a	5a	"Black Magic Bag"	Doug Lawrence	Mark Evanier and Doug Lawrence	October 19, 1996
18b	5b	"The Maltese Milkshake"	Jim Schumann	Mark Evanier and Jim Schumann	October 19, 1996
18c	5c	"Attack of the Robot Rat"	Pat Ventura	Mark Evanier, Pat Ventura, and Craig Kellman	October 19, 1996
19a	6a	"Heart of Tin"	Chris Moeller	Mark Evanier and Chris Moeller	November 2, 1996
19b	6b	"Battle of the Brains"	Doug Lawrence	Mark Evanier and Doug Lawrence	November 2, 1996
19c	6c	"TV or Not TV"	Pat Shinagawa	Mark Evanier and Pat Shinagawa	November 2, 1996
20a	7a	"Wizards and Lizards"	Russell Crispin	Mark Evanier and Russell Crispin	April 5, 1997
20b	7b	"The Evil Donut"	Jim Schumann	Mark Evanier and Jim Schumann	April 5, 1997
20c	7c	"An Auto Biography"	Doug Lawrence	Mark Evanier and Doug Lawrence	April 5, 1997
21a	8a	"Comicalamities"	Pat Ventura	Mark Evanier, Pat Ventura, and Craig Kellman	April 12, 1997
21b	8b	"Super Felix"	Chris Moeller	Mark Evanier and Chris Moeller	April 12, 1997
21c	8c	"Dueling Whiskers"	Doug Lawrence	Mark Evanier and Doug Lawrence	April 12, 1997

== Broadcast ==
The series first aired on September 16, 1995 on CBS, lasting for two seasons, with the final episode airing on April 12, 1997. The first season consists of 13 episodes and the second and final season consists of 8 episodes.

The show also has Spanish-dubbed episodes of the series aired on Saturday mornings on Univision in the United States from September 16, 2000, to September 8, 2001, as part of the ¡De Cabeza! block as Los Nuevos Cuentos de Felix el Gato. It also has Spanish-dubbed episodes of the series aired on Saturday and Sunday mornings on Telefutura in 2003 as part of Toonturama as Las Nuevas Aventuras de Felix el Gato along with Bruno the Kid and Mortal Kombat: Defenders of the Realm.
