= Felix the Cat (TV series) =

American animated television series

- Genre: Comedy
- Created by: Joe Oriolo; Pat Sullivan Jr.
- Based on: Felix the Cat by Pat Sullivan and Otto Messmer
- Written by: Joe Sabo; Joe Stultz
- Directed by: Joe Oriolo
- Voices of: Jack Mercer
- Theme music composer: Winston Sharples
- Composer: Winston Sharples
- Country of origin: United States
- Original language: English
- No. of seasons: 2
- No. of episodes: 130

Production
- Executive producer: Pat Sullivan Jr.
- Producer: Joe Oriolo
- Running time: 4–5 minutes
- Production companies: Adventure Cartoon Productions; Felix the Cat Productions; Trans-Lux

Original release
- Network: Syndication
- Release: October 2, 1958 – 1961

Related
- The Twisted Tales of Felix the Cat (1995–1997)

Felix the Cat is an American animated television series featuring the cartoon character of the same name.

Like The Van Beuren Corporation before, Joe Oriolo gave Felix a more domesticated and pedestrian personality, geared more toward children, and introduced Felix's now-famous item of the "Magic Bag of Tricks", a satchel that can assume the shape and characteristics of anything Felix wants, and several new main characters such as Felix's arch-enemy, The Professor and his cigar-smoking bulldog sidekick Rock Bottom. The cartoons are divided into two parts, with the first part ending in a cliffhanger resolved after a commercial break.

A second Felix series, The Twisted Tales of Felix the Cat, aired on CBS in 1995–1997.

== Background ==
In 1954, Otto Messmer retired from the Felix daily newspaper strips, and his assistant Joe Oriolo (the co-creator of Casper the Friendly Ghost) took over, since King Features Syndicate wanted him to take over. Oriolo struck a deal with Felix's new owner to begin a new series of Felix cartoons for television. Oriolo starred Felix in 130 two-part stories or a total of 260 television cartoons produced by Felix the Cat Productions, and distributed by Trans-Lux.

The show did away with Felix's previous supporting cast and introduced many new characters. These characters were all performed by voice actor Jack Mercer. Oriolo's plots revolve around the unsuccessful attempts of the antagonists to steal Felix's Magic Bag, though in an unusual twist, these antagonists are occasionally depicted as Felix's friends as well. While the cartoons were a ratings success, critics have dismissed them as paling in comparison to the earlier Sullivan-Messmer works. Oriolo aimed the cartoons at children. The series used limited animation (owing to a limited budget) and simplistic storylines.

This TV series also helped introduce the character of Felix the Cat to audiences in Japan. A Japanese language dub of the series aired on NHK from July 4, 1960, to January 24, 1961, and was rerun three years later on Fuji TV. Four decades later, Felix would be the star of his own Japanese animated series.

== Characters ==
Felix the Cat
The main character and star of the show. He has many adventures with his little magic bag of tricks that often helps in dangerous situations. Two different patterns were used for the magic bag, one is the earlier version pattern that is a dot and cross pattern. The latter series bag was a houndstooth pattern that replaced the dot and cross. All the episodes having the houndstooth pattern are missing from the market place. No matter what the situation, he almost always ends up laughing. A few of the episodes end with Felix on the losing end without the laughter, or his other signature line, "Righty-o!", before he starts laughing.

The Professor
He is Felix's archenemy or foil and, in most appearances, is trying to seize the Magic Bag of Tricks. He has a very amusing speech impediment and is quite eccentric. He is depicted as a mad scientist, very intelligent, yet very obsessed. He attempts many tricks such as the use of his inventions and many disguises to get Felix's magic bag, but always winds up failing in the end. In some episodes where his nephew Poindexter is involved, the Professor becomes a reluctant ally of Felix, particularly when they battle the Master Cylinder. In some of the episodes, when the professor gives up on his episodic schemes, he intones with the words: "Oh, what's the use!!!!!"

Poindexter
He is the nerdy young nephew of the Professor and the best friend and sidekick of Felix. He is depicted as a stereotypical scientist; he is very intelligent and always wears thick Coke-bottle glasses, a lab coat, and a mortarboard. A button on the chest of his lab coat acts as a control for whatever device the plot calls for. Despite the Professor being his uncle, he is also one of Felix's best friends. Whenever he talks to Felix, he refers to him as "Mr. Felix". Felix sometimes refers to Poindexter as "Poinsy".

Rock Bottom
The Professor's bumbling sidekick (a bulldog who walks and dresses like a human being) who tries to help the Professor steal Felix's Magic Bag. Rock Bottom's full name is Rock Bottom Age. He occasionally works for Master Cylinder. Like the Professor, in some of the episodes, when Rock Bottom's schemes fail, he intones with the words: "Oh, what's the use!!!!!"

Master Cylinder
An evil, cylindrical robot who first appeared in the 1958 episode "Master Cylinder-King of the Moon". He is always trying to kidnap Poindexter so that he can use his intellect to build weapons and equipment. It is revealed that he was once a pupil of the Professor at an academy until an explosion destroyed his original body.

Martin the Martian
The good Martian who always helps Felix and his friends whenever they are in a space jam.

General Clang
The evil general in space, an octopus who also wants the rocket formula in order to destroy the Earth.

Vavoom
A small, unassuming and friendly Inuit whose only vocalization is a (literally) Earth-shattering shout of his own name "VAVOOM!" (but who is absolutely powerless if his mouth was taped shut). He first appeared in "Felix and Vavoom".

== Theme song ==
The program is also remembered for its distinctive theme song. It was written by Winston Sharples and performed by 1950s big band singer Ann Bennett.

== Episodes ==
=== Series overview ===
Season	Episodes	Originally released	
Season	Episodes	First released	Last released
1	31	October 2, 1958	1959
2	99	September 1960	1961

=== Season 1 (1958–59) ===
The Magic Bag

No. overall	No. in season	Title	Original release date
1	1	"The Magic Bag"	October 2, 1958
2	2	"Into Outer Space"	October 2, 1958
3	3	"Abominable Snowman"	October 9, 1958
4	4	"Felix Out West"	November 3, 1958
5	5	"Felix the Cat Suit"	November 10, 1958
6	6	"Electronic Brainwasher"	November 17, 1958
7	7	"Do-It-Yourself Monster Book"	November 20, 1958
8	8	"Blubberino the Whale"	November 27, 1958
9	9	"Ghostly Concert"	December 1, 1958
10	10	"Captain No-Kiddin'"	December 1958
11	11	"Felix in Egypt"	December 1958
12	12	"Detective Thinking Hat"	December 1958
13	13	"Balloon Blower Machine"	December 1958
14	14	"Friday the 13th"	December 26, 1958
15	15	"Stone Making Machine"	January 1959
16	16	"Penelope the Elephant"	January 1959
17	17	"The Money Tree"	January 1959
18	18	"Oil and Indians Don't Mix"	February 1959
19	19	"The Glittering Jewels"	February 1959
20	20	"The Gold Car and County Fair"	1959
21	21	"Sheriff Felix vs. the Gas Cloud"	1959
22	22	"Felix's Gold Mine"	1959
23	23	"How to Steal a Gold Mine"	1959
24	24	"Private Eye Felix and Pierre Mustache"	1959
25	25	"The Gold Fruit Tree"	1959
26	26	"The Flying Saucer"	1959
27	27	"Felix Baby-Sits"	1959
28	28	"Instant Money"	1959
29	29	"Master Cylinder – King of the Moon"	1959
30	30	"The Invisible Professor"	1959
31	31	"Venus and the Master Cylinder"	1959

=== Season 2 (1960–61) ===
No. overall	No. in season	Title	Original release date
32	1	"The Termites of 1960"	September 1960
33	2	"Moo Moo Island Oysters"	September 1960
34	3	"The Mouse and Felix"	September 1960
35	4	"King Neptune's S.O.S."	1960
36	5	"Relax-a-Lawn Chair"	1960
37	6	"The African Diamond Affair"	1960
38	7	"Felix's Prize Garden"	1960
39	8	"Finally, the Magic Bag Is Mine!"	1960
40	9	"Felix and the Rhinoceros"	1960
41	10	"Felix-Finder and the Ghost Town"	1960
42	11	"Snoopascope, a Magic Bag of Tricks"	1960
43	12	"Stone Age Felix"	1960
44	13	"The Gold Silkworms"	1960
45	14	"Felix and Vavoom"	1960
46	15	"The Jubilee Dime"	1960
47	16	"Movie Star Felix"	1960
48	17	"Youth Water"	1960
49	18	"Game Warden Felix"	1960
50	19	"Master Cylinder Captures Poindexter"	1960
51	20	"Atomic Drive Explosion of Master Cylinder"	1960
52	21	"Supertoy"	1960
53	22	"The Jewel Bird"	1960
54	23	"The Atomic Rocket Fuel"	1960
55	24	"The Hairy Berry Bush"	1960
56	25	"General Clang and the Secret Rocket Fuel"	1960
57	26	"The Rajah's Elephants"	1960
58	27	"The Exchanging Machine"	1960
59	28	"The Leprechaun"	1960
60	29	"The Master Cylinder's Spacegram"	1960
61	30	"The Leprechaun's Gold"	1960
62	31	"Baby Pill"	1960
63	32	"Felix the Cat Finds the Golden Bug"	1960
64	33	"Anti Gravity Generator"	1960
65	34	"Adventures of Felix"	1960
66	35	"Felix and the Mid-Evil Ages"	1961
67	36	"The Capturing of the Leprechaun King"	1961
68	37	"Martin the Martian Meets Felix the Cat"	1961
69	38	"The Professor’s Committed No Crime!"	1961
70	39	"The Martian Rescue"	1961
71	40	"The Portable Closet"	1961
72	41	"Redbeard the Pirate"	1961
73	42	"A Museum, the Professor and Rock Bottom"	1961
74	43	"The Professor’s Instant Charger"	1961
75	44	"The Vacation Mirage"	1961
76	45	"Cat-Napped"	1961
77	46	"The Sea Monster and Felix"	1961
78	47	"The Diamond Tree"	1961
79	48	"King of the Leprechauns"	1961
80	49	"The Magic Apples"	1961
81	50	"Oysters and Starfishes"	1961
82	51	"The Haunted House"	1961
83	52	"Gold Digger Vavoom"	1961
84	53	"The Wizard and Sir Rock"	1961
85	54	"The Coal Diamonds"	1961
86	55	"Vacation with Mr. Bart"	1961
87	56	"Out West with Big Brownie"	1961
88	57	"Liquid Light"	1961
89	58	"The Little Cloud and Mount Boom Boom"	1961
90	59	"Love-Sick Squirt Gun"	1961
91	60	"Mechanical Felix"	1961
92	61	"The Ski Jump"	1961
93	62	"Felix and the Beanstalk"	1961
94	63	"The Milky Way"	1961
95	64	"The Super Rocket Formula"	1961
96	65	"The Weather Maker"	1961
97	66	"The Giant Magnet"	1961
98	67	"The Instant Truck Melter"	1961
99	68	"The Pep Pill"	1961
100	69	"Leprechaun Gold From Rainbows"	1961
101	70	"The Magnetic Ray"	1961
102	71	"The Instant Grower"	1961
103	72	"The Professor’s Ancestor? The Wizard"	1961
104	73	"Luring the Magic Bag of Tricks"	1961
105	74	"The Uranium Discovery"	1961
106	75	"Chief Standing Bull"	1961
107	76	"The Strongest Robot in the World"	1961
108	77	"Stairway to the Stars"	1961
109	78	"Cleaning House"	1961
110	79	"Vavoom Learns How to Fish"	1961
111	80	"The Golden Nugget"	1961
112	81	"The Bad Genie"	1961
113	82	"Felix and Poindexter Out West"	1961
114	83	"The Genie"	1961
115	84	"The Rajah’s Zoo"	1961
116	85	"The Loan Business"	1961
117	86	"A Treasure Chest"	1961
118	87	"The Essence of Money"	1961
119	88	"Mercury’s Winged Sandals"	1961
120	89	"The $10,000 Vacation"	1961
121	90	"Brother Pebble Bottom"	1961
122	91	"The North Pole and a Walrus Hunt"	1961
123	92	"Cleopatra’s Beauty Secrets"	1961
124	93	"Walrus Enroute"	1961
125	94	"The Golden Whale Baby-Sitter"	1961
126	95	"North Pole Jail Hole"	1961
127	96	"Felix the Handyman"	1961
128	97	"Public Enemies One and Two"	1961
129	98	"The Horse Thieves"	1961
130	99	"Great Sphinx"	1961

== Home media ==
Eight episodes were released on VHS by Media Home Entertainment. In 2001, Golden Books Family Entertainment and Sony Wonder released a "Collector's Edition" DVD featuring ten episodes from the first season. This DVD was eventually reissued by Classic Media and Genius Products in 2006 and by DreamWorks Animation in 2014, under the title "Mischief and Mayhem". In October 2007, Classic Media and Genius Products released the entire first season on DVD under the title "Felix the Cat: Golden Anniversary Edition".
