= Church of St. Felix =

Church of St. Felix may refer to:

- Church of St. Felix, Nantes, France
- Church of St. Felix, Girona, Spain
- Church of St. Felix, El Pino, Spain
- St Felix's Church, Felixkirk, England
