= São Félix =

São Félix (Portuguese for "Saint Felix") can refer to the following places:

== Brazil ==
- São Félix, Bahia, a municipality in Bahia, Brazil
- São Félix de Balsas, a municipality in Maranhão, Brazil
- São Félix de Minas, a municipality in Minas Gerais, Brazil
- São Félix do Araguaia, a municipality in Mato Grosso, Brazil
- São Félix do Coribe, a municipality in Bahia, Brazil
- São Félix do Piauí, a municipality in Piauí, Brazil
- São Félix do Tocantins, a municipality in Tocantins, Brazil
- São Félix do Xingu, a municipality in Pará, Brazil

== Portugal ==
- São Félix da Marinha, a town and parish in Vila Nova de Gaia, Porto, Portugal
- São Félix Hill, the highest hill in Póvoa de Varzim, Portugal
