= Church of St. Felix, Nantes =

Coordinates: 47.2312°N 1.5557°W

Church of St. Felix
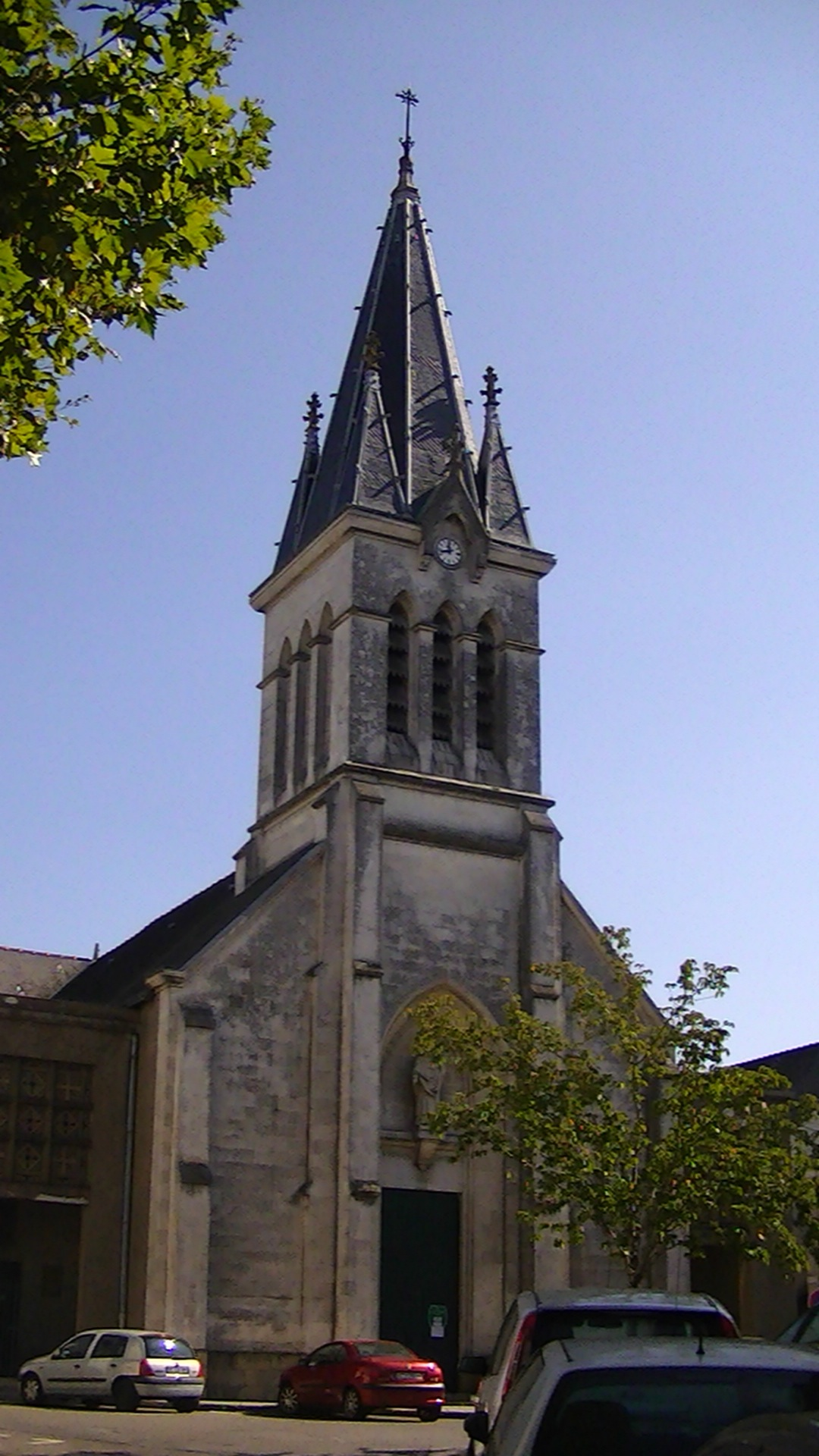
- Église Saint-Félix

Religion
- Affiliation: Roman Catholic Church
- Region: Hauts-Pavés
- Ecclesiastical or organisational status: Parish church
- Status: Active

Location
- Location: Saint Felix, France
- Interactive map of Church of St. Felix

Architecture
- Type: Church
- Style: Gothic

The Church of St. Felix (French: Église Saint-Félix) is a Roman Catholic church located in the district of Hauts-Pavés/Saint Felix, in Nantes, France. The church is dedicated to the fifth century French bishop, Felix of Nantes.

== History ==
Before its creation, the current St. Felix parish was part of the village of Barbin, and it adjoined St. Similien parish.

The church was built from August 1843 on the land bordering the château de la Haute-Forêt, with plans by architect Charles Raymond (1813–1872). In a Gothic Revival style and with a small scale. Once completed, the small rural church was extended and dedicated to Monsignor Jean-François de Hercé on 25 February 1844. At the time, the vault was not completely finished and the floor was not paved.

In 1856, the Ministry of Interior offers a memorial for Olivier Saint-Félix converting the Saxons, and added two wings to the nineteenth-century building. The church was enlarged again around 1950 and consecrated on 20 June 1953. All the windows are works of Gabriel Loire.

== Organs ==
The great organ of Saint-Félix church date from 1954 and was inaugurated by Maurice Duruflé. They were later restored by organ-builder Denis Lacorre in 2008.

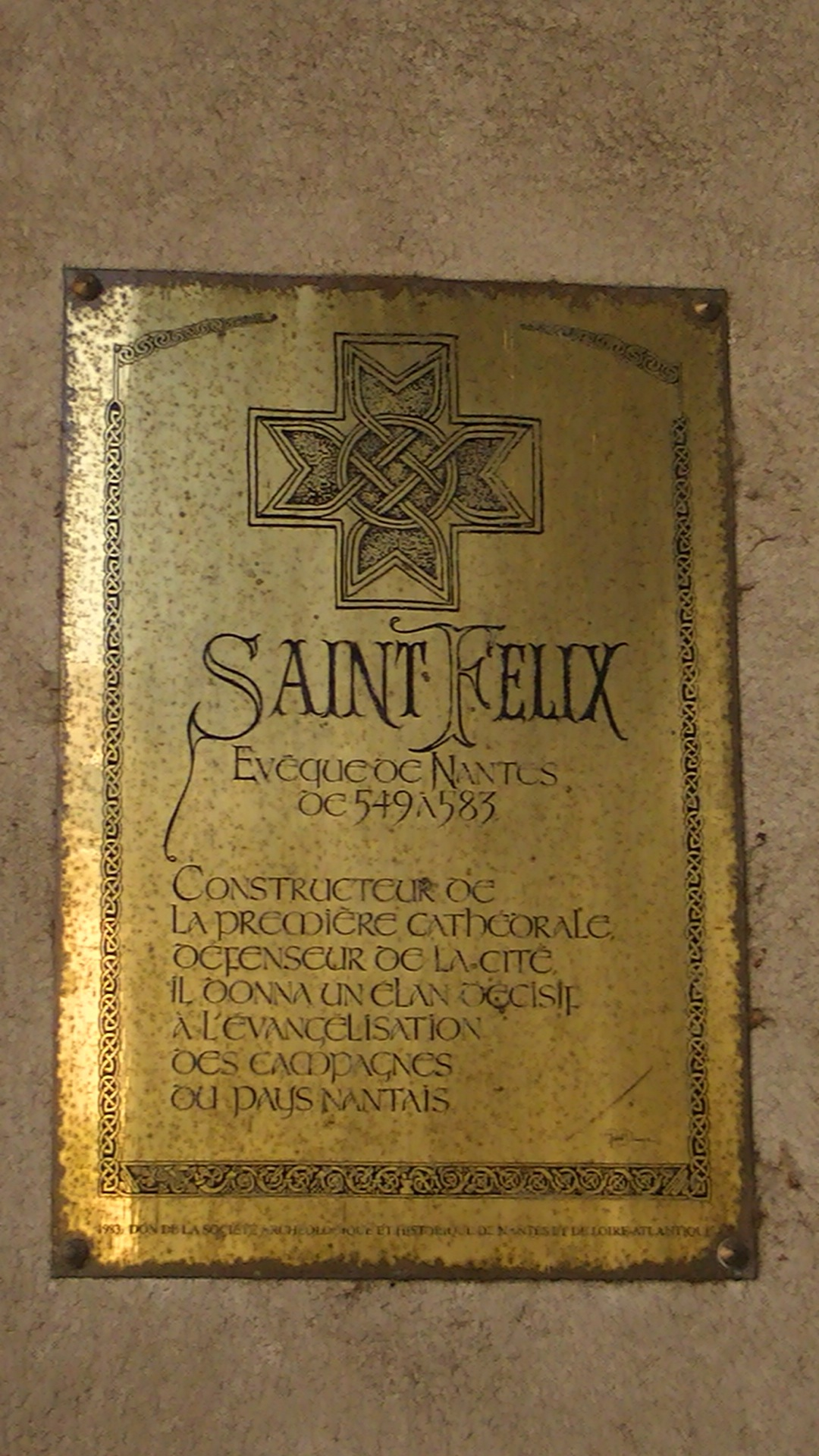
Plaque

== See also ==
- Église Saint-Similien
