= Trans-Lux =

American electronic manufacturing company

Trans-Lux Corporation
- Type: Public company
- Traded as: OTC Pink Current: TNLX
- Industry: Manufacturing, High technology
- Founded: 1920
- Headquarters: New York City, United States
- Key people: Nicholas J. Fazio, CEO as of April 2020
- Products: See complete products listing.
- Revenue: ▼$23.5 million USD (2015)
- Number of employees: 100 (2016)
- Website: www.trans-lux.com

Trans-Lux is a company that specializes in designing, selling, leasing, and maintaining multi-color, real-time data and LED large-screen electronic information displays, but is primarily known as a major supplier of national stock ticker displays for stock exchanges. These indoor and outdoor displays are used worldwide in many industries, including banking, gaming, corporate, retail, healthcare, sports, transportation and in the financial industry.

== Early history ==
The company was created by Percy Norman Furber, an Englishman, who moved to the United States in October 1918, after a time spent drilling for oil and mining quicksilver in Mexico. Furber was interested in developing a projection system that could be used in a lighted room. To help with this he enlisted the aid of a friend, Arthur Payne, a former employee of Thomas Edison. Payne had the idea of rear projection; projecting an image through a screen rather than on it. However, this concept required a finer and more translucent screen-material than what was available at that time.

== Moving light ==
In 1920, Furber formed American Lux (Latin for "light") Products. Three years later, using a fine high-quality natural silk American Lux Products managed to create its first successful screen, with initial sales going mostly to schools and churches. It was only after a visit to the New York Stock Exchange that Furber saw a truly profitable application for rear projection screens. At that time, brokers obtained the latest stock quotes from a glass dome-topped ticker. This information was provided by Western Union's telegraph and/or wire service. The machine printed the results onto a long thin piece of paper known as a ticker tape, with the brokers closest to the printer having the advantage. Prior to this invention, any stock information was hand-written, usually on a chalk board. Although the results were less immediate, they were better displayed. Furber combined the best aspects of both methods, by enlarging the stock quotations from the running ticker tape and displaying them onto a rear projection screen. In 1923, the company installed the first "Movie ticker" ticker tape projection system at the New York Stock Exchange. Like every ticker of the time it was a mechanical format, but by using yellow dots on a black background it gave the illusion of electronically generated green letters and numbers.

It is this stock ticker that provided the company's name: "Trans-Lux" meaning "moving light".

Financing this new operation required more capital, so Furber took his company public on August 26, 1925. It was listed on the New York Curb Exchange, which later became the American Stock Exchange. Until being delisted in 2011, Trans-Lux stock was the oldest company to be listed on the American Stock Exchange. In 1925, the company had 41 installations on stock exchange floors and brokerage house boardrooms throughout the country.

== Moving pictures ==
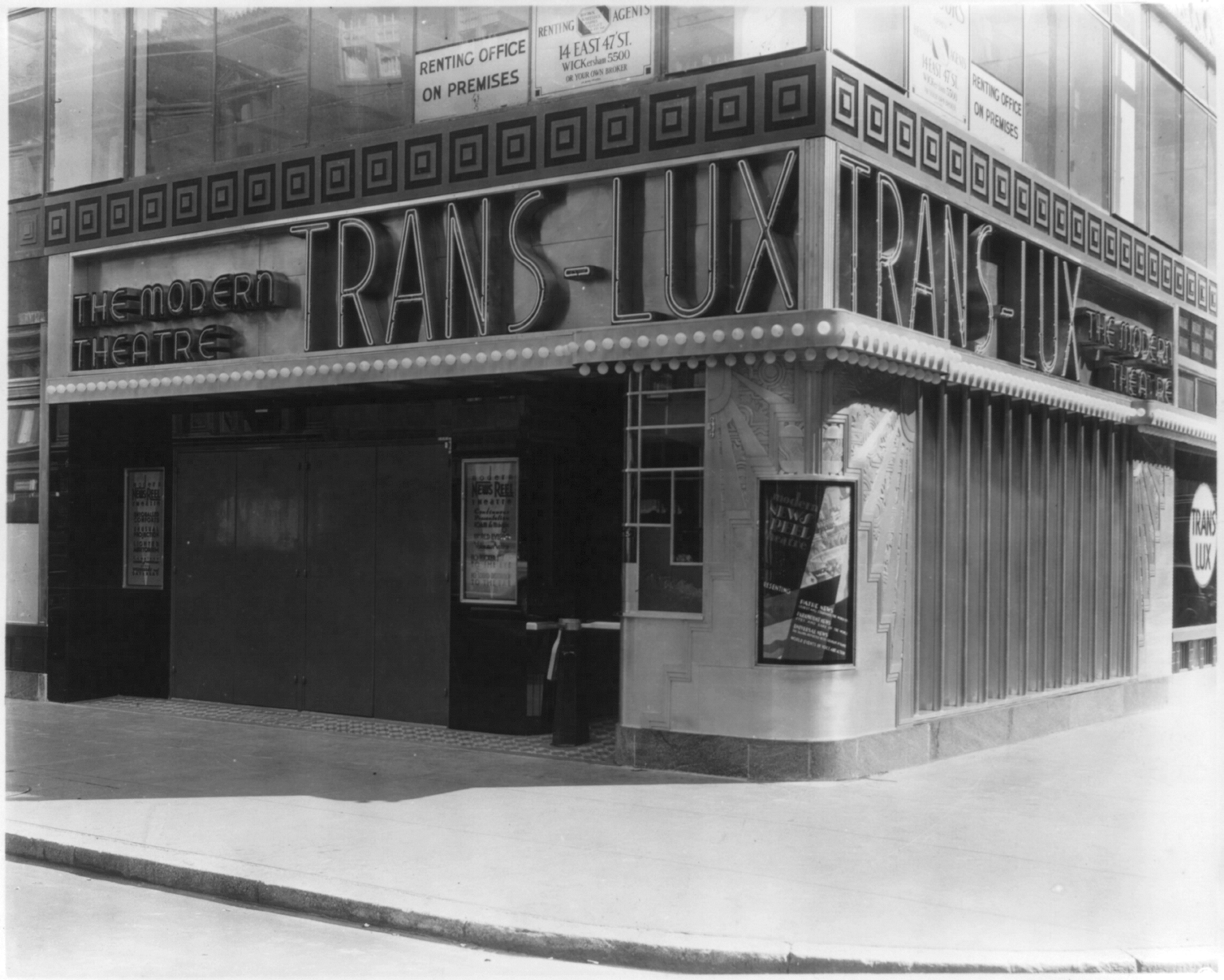
Trans-Lux Theater, 58th St. and Madison Ave., New York City; exterior corner view, April 8, 1931

By 1927 the company had created a much larger, commercial-sized theater screen and took it, along with its rear projector system and a new wide-angle lens, to the motion picture industry. In partnership with RKO (Radio-Keith-Orpheum) Studios, the Trans-Lux Movies Corporation was created to penetrate the market further. Using Trans-Lux as its trade name, it began a theater-building program. The first Trans-Lux theater at 58th Street and Madison Avenue in New York City was actually converted from retail space, and featured larger seats, more legroom, and wider aisles than the average theater of the day. Seating only 158, it was much too small for the crowd it attracted. The rear projection technology allowed the house lights to remain low so patrons could read their programs and easily locate their seats, and also eliminated the distraction of a beam of light slicing down through the crowd from an overhead projection booth. In accordance with its news "heritage" the News cinema featured a program made up exclusively of "shorts" (usually comedy routines or musical numbers) and newsreels. When the company's third theater opened two blocks away on 60th and Madison on November 10, 1933, it was turned back into retail space.

In 1931, Percy Furber turned over company operations to his son, Percy. By this time, Trans-Lux had 4,000 stockholders, over 100 employees, and was valued at $2 million. In 1934, the company opened two more newsreel theaters in Brooklyn, New York and one in Philadelphia. Three more locations were added over the next three years, with architect Thomas W. Lamb designing the theater in Washington, D.C.. Offering 600 seats covered in blue leather, its lobby decorated with sports murals by New York artist Andre Hudiakoff, it was one of the first public buildings in the city to have air conditioning. Located one block away from the White House, it was considered to be the most elegant Art Deco theater in the capital, up until its untimely demolition in 1975.

In 1937 the company shortened its name to the Trans-Lux Corporation. Along with other theater-related businesses, it initially suffered during the postwar movie slump. Returning veterans were attending college on the GI Bill, marrying, and starting families. Newlyweds and young families with babies were usually on a budget and put the purchase of a home, a car, and new appliances ahead of going to the movies. The company's declining newsreel movie business quickly recovered when it switched to showing first-run feature films in 1949, but weekly theater attendance still experienced a dramatic drop: from 78.2 million in 1946 to 58 million by 1950, when the American public chose to sit at home in front of their new television sets rather than go out to the movies.

As this postwar middle-class began moving from the cities to the suburbs, shopping complexes to support them proliferated, and theaters followed. In 1964 Trans-Lux built its first shopping center theater, an 850-seat facility in Reisterstown Road Plaza Mall in Baltimore. By 1969, the company had brought large, modern theaters to five more suburban shopping centers, nearly doubling the size of its theater holdings, and by 1965 had 37 theaters in ten states.

By the end of the 1960s, the theater building boom was over as well. In 1973 Trans-Lux lost money on its theaters for the first time in years. The boom had aggravated the newly independent industry's problem of a shortage of quality movies. Bidding on films became fierce, and many companies split their single theaters into twins. Three screen and four screen theaters began appearing, and when Richard Brandt replaced Percy Furber as chairman of the board in 1974, the multiplex trend (with as many as 12 screens) was in full swing. Some of the company's theaters were split into two and three screen houses, and others were sold off entirely.

In the midst of this, Trans-Lux went into the business of multimedia shows. The 1970 premiere of the San Francisco Experience, a 29-projector, seven-screen spectacular with 30 special effects inspired the company to hire its creators to develop a nearly $1 million budget multimedia entertainment film about New York City. The September 28, 1973, opening of the 45-projector, 16-screen film was called "bedazzling and breathtaking" by The New York Times. The New York Experience, which was housed in a sub-basement of the McGraw-Hill Building in Rockefeller Center, became the longest-running commercial multimedia show in history. The show featured panoramic movie screens, slide projections, extensive light and sound systems, and a mannequin that dropped out of the ceiling to recreate the hanging of Nathan Hale. Escalating rent costs forced its closure in 1989.

By 1981, Trans-Lux's theater holdings were reduced to 28 screens, concentrated in the Northeast, particularly Connecticut. By the mid-1990s, the theater division invested in building new theaters in the western US, bringing the company's total to 65 screens. In 2000, the firm opened its own Los Angeles-based film booking office.

== Television ==
By 1950, television had become America's most popular form of entertainment. In 1940, there were only 3,785 television sets in the US, with stations in only five cities. Two decades later, nine out of ten homes had at least one set.

Trans-Lux soon began developing specialized rear-projection equipment for television studios, greatly expanded its engineering capacity and started supplying the studios with "Teleprocess" screens and projectors. When closed circuit television (CCTV) appeared in the late 1940s, Trans-Lux adapted that technology for viewing stock market information and formed an electronics division to develop and sell CCTV systems in 1959. They also developed a television program syndication service, and in association with Adventure Cartoon Productions produced the popular Saturday-morning animated series: Felix the Cat and The Mighty Hercules. The expanded business required Trans-Lux to move from its Brooklyn headquarters to a larger, five-story building in Long Island City. They also produced Mack and Myer for Hire at the Hempstead Studios in Long Island City.

In 1967, they commissioned Titra Studios, a New York City recording company that provided English translations for foreign movies, to "Americanize" the new anime series, Speed Racer, for domestic television. Trans-Lux retained the series until 1969, when it sold off its animated television holdings in order to concentrate on manufacturing illuminated stock market tickers. Trans-Lux's film catalog was purchased by independent distributor Alan Gleitsman, whose Alan Enterprises continued to syndicate Speed Racer to independent TV stations throughout the 1970s. That same year the company moved its headquarters again, this time relocating to Norwalk, Connecticut. Starting in the 1990s, all current airings and home media releases of Speed Racer no longer use the opening "Trans-Lux television presents" caption.

As for the Trans-Lux library, Gleitsman left the syndication business in 1986 and sold his assets to a colorization company called Color Systems Technology, which in turn sold the library (which includes the Alan Enterprises/Trans-Lux library, the rights to Speed Racer, and the Adventure Cartoon Productions series) to Broadway Video in 1989 due to bankruptcy.

== Stock quotes and signage ==
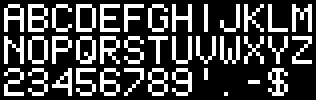
Character set of Trans-Lux traveling message signs, created in 1940

In 1940, Trans-Lux purchased a patent for a remote-control signaling system that enabled small rounded pellets to form letters and numbers and travel around outdoor message signs. It also joined forces with the Artkraft Strauss Sign Corporation, which was the first signage corporation to first illuminate the "Great White Way" of Broadway. By 1948 it was supplying electrical traveling message signs to advertisers, radio stations, and publishers throughout the country. At the same time, Trans-Lux had 1,400 stock-ticker projectors and 80 news projectors in the United States, plus another 200 in Canada.

By the early '60s, Trans-Lux began to see a need for greater investment in electronics as stock exchanges and brokerage firms were inundated with new, advanced techniques for gathering and projecting information. The company's fortunes were tied to its old system's two-step process: the information it relied on began with prices from the ticker tape, then a delay was required as the ticker tape shifted away from the print head to a viewing position for projecting or televising. With an electronic ticker display, Trans-Lux could bypass the printing stage, creating a real-time, immediate information system.

In 1965, the company was shocked by the introduction of a new 45-foot (14 m)-long electronic display installed on the trading floor of the New York Stock Exchange by a competitor, Recognition Equipment Inc. (REI), of Dallas. Even though the Ultronic Letrascan electronic wall device had been steadily replacing Trans-Lux tickers for several years, the New York Stock Exchange installation was cause for concern, as Trans-Lux had enjoyed a long-standing business relationship with the exchange. The company made a deal with REI: since Trans-Lux needed Recognition's technology, and they needed Trans-Lux's knowledge of how to market stock-ticker equipment, they formed a joint venture to create a much smaller version of the Recognition system.

Two years later, they announced the Trans-Lux Jet, named for the jets of air that controlled character formation in the sign. It was the highest quality, real-time, continuous flow wall display yet produced, and a new method of viewing up-to-the-minute stock market sales information. Its ten-foot size made it perfect for brokerage offices, but perhaps the best news for Trans-Lux was that it no longer needed to rely on the Western Union ticker. U.S. and Canadian brokerage houses ordered more than 1,000 Trans-Lux Jets in the first six months, and Trans-Lux opened an international office in Zurich, Switzerland to deal with overseas orders. By mid-1969, about 3,000 Jets were in use. Shortly after introducing the Jet, Trans-Lux applied the same innovations to closed-circuit television.

The Jet's popularity required Trans-Lux to find a larger production facility. In 1970, the company moved to Norwalk, Connecticut. Demand for Jets continued to grow. Longer versions of 15, 25, and 43 feet (13 m) were produced. In 1969, Trans-Lux had succeeded in reducing the size of the Jet to one-fifth of the original. Ten years later, by developing a powerful miniature microprocessor chip, the company reduced the Jet to one-twenty-fifth of its original size.

As successful as the Jet was, it failed to address one important segment of the stock market: large portfolio holders and active traders had no way to automatically focus on their market objectives and private individual stock holdings. When a Chicago-based company, Quotemaster (later Extel) developed an experimental prototype for a selective read-out device, Trans-Lux approached them. The company soon began to develop and then manufacturing the device, now called the Personal Ticker, which could be programmed to monitor up to 40 stocks on a single exchange. By 1969, Trans-Lux began installing the product for private investors, portfolio managers, pension fund administrators, investment advisors, and individual brokers. That same year the strong growing market abruptly ended, drastically impacting installations of all types of Trans-Lux equipment.

Following the market decline, Trans-Lux management learned that their electronic display sales should not be overly dependent on a single industry, and decided to diversify. The company formed an industrial sales department in 1970 under the leadership of Louis Credidio, who went after the international market capturing a small but significant new market. When Extel's teleprinter terminal sales boomed, it contracted Trans-Lux to manufacture keyboards and way-station selectors, which led to Trans-Lux's entry into the teleprinter market. Credidio studied the telex terminal field and by 1974 Trans-Lux began marketing a telex terminal, the Trans-Lux Teleprinter (TLT), to several industries. More than 700 terminals were installed by 1975.

== Diversification ==
Early in 1995, Trans-Lux acquired Integrated Systems Engineering, Inc., a full-service electronic sign manufacturing company, to broaden its outdoor signage capabilities, such as those found on billboards, or outside truck stops, banks, and sports arenas. The company's capacity to produce electronic displays increased in 2000 when it opened a modern outdoor display manufacturing facility in Utah. The indoor display division remained a major supplier of communications tools for the banking and financial community, but now theaters, museums, hotels, corporations, and military hospitals were customers. The division experienced a growth spurt in 2000 when the Australian Gaming Control Board approved Trans-Lux's serial slot controller for sale in their country. That decision also boosted sales of the LED jackpot meter displays that work hand in hand with the slot controllers. Trans-Lux also entered the health care industry with products designed for hospitals, pharmacies, and outpatient clinics by offering critical information displays.

Trans-Lux continued to supply LED/incandescent displays and scoring systems to major and minor league baseball teams, such as the San Francisco Giants. In addition to professional baseball, Trans-Lux has provided displays and equipment to other professional sports teams, such as the NBA's Charlotte Hornets and Detroit Pistons.

By 2002, annual revenues had reached $70.1 million in three divisions: outdoor displays, indoor displays, and entertainment/real estate. While the company headquarters still remain in Norwalk, manufacturing operations were moved to Stratford, Connecticut in 2008. Trans-Lux now has major U.S. sales and service centers in Norwalk; New York; Atlanta; Chicago; and Torrance, California, in addition to their satellite offices throughout the U.S. and Canada. Subsidiary companies are located in Iowa, Utah, Canada, and Australia. Trans-Lux's International Division maintains a distributor network throughout the world, including most major financial centers as well as in many newly developing countries. In recent years, company headquarters have returned to New York, with the Norwalk and Atlanta sales and services centers merged into the New York office. As a further consequence, the Chicago office closed, while the Torrance, California office moved to Camarillo, California.

== Company divisions ==
Trans-Lux also has three subsidiaries:

- Fair Play Scoreboards, a scoreboard and sports equipment manufacturer.
- TL Energy, a provider of LED lighting.
- PrismaTronic, a provider of Digital LEDs for the OOH marketplace

== Public documents ==
As stated in SEC paperwork, on March 28, 2003, a wholly owned subsidiary, Trans-Lux Corporation, sold its custom sports division, including licensing of intellectual property and its facility located in Logan, Utah to Barco, Inc., for a cash price of approximately $3.7 million, plus assumption of two Industrial Revenue Bonds totaling approximately $4.2 million, for an approximate total sale price of $7.9 million.

Trans-Lux also announced that it received a letter dated November 10, 2010, from NYSE Amex informing it that the Listings Qualifications Panel of the Exchange's Committee on Securities has affirmed the determination to delist Trans-Lux's common stock as of November 17, 2010.
