= Felix, California =

Unincorporated community in California, United States

Felix
- Unincorporated community
- Location in California Felix (the United States)
- Coordinates: 38°01′42″N 120°42′57″W
- Country: United States
- State: California
- County: Calaveras
- Elevation: 1,120 ft (340 m)

Felix is an unincorporated community in Calaveras County, California, United States, in Salt Spring Valley, 9.5 miles (15.3 km) west-southwest of Angels Camp. It lies at an elevation of 1115 feet (340 m). A post office operated here from 1896 to 1923.
