= Felicia (film) =

1965 American short documentary film

Felicia is a 1965 short documentary film directed by UCLA students Bob Dickson, Alan Gorg and Trevor Greenwood. It features an erudite black high school student, Felicia Bragg, discussing her family life, school and future in the Watts neighborhood of Los Angeles, California. The film was shot prior to the "Watts riots" which occurred in that neighborhood in August 1965.

Felicia was selected for preservation in the United States National Film Registry of the Library of Congress in 2014, being deemed "culturally, historically, or aesthetically significant".
