= Felicia (disambiguation) =

Felicia is a feminine given name.

Felicia may also refer to:

== Arts ==
- Felicia (film), a 1965 documentary short film
- "Felicia", a song by The Constellations

== Sciences ==
- Hurricane Felicia (disambiguation)
- 294 Felicia, an asteroid in the main belt of the Solar System
- Felicia (plant), a genus of daisy-like flowering plants

== Other uses ==
- Felicia, Argentina, a town in Santa Fe Province, Argentina
- Škoda Felicia, an automobile
- Bye, Felicia, a dismissive send-off from the movie Friday

== See also ==
- FeliCa, a smart card system
- Felicity (disambiguation)
- Felix (disambiguation)
