= The Mighty Hercules =

- Genre: Action; Adventure
- Created by: Adventure Cartoon Productions
- Directed by: Joe Oriolo
- Voices of: Gerry Bascombe; Jimmy Tapp; Helene Nickerson
- Opening theme: "The Mighty Hercules" sung by Johnny Nash
- Country of origin: United States
- Original language: English
- No. of episodes: 128

Production
- Producer: Joe Oriolo
- Running time: 5 minutes (usually compiled into 30-minute omnibuses)
- Production companies: Adventure Cartoon Productions; Trans-Lux

Original release
- Network: Syndication
- Release: September 1, 1963 – May 1, 1966

The Mighty Hercules is an American animated television series based loosely on the Greek mythology character of Heracles, under his Roman name Hercules. It debuted on television in 1963. The show ran until 1966, coinciding with the sword-and-sandal genre of films popular between 1958 and 1965. Each stand-alone episode runs 5½ minutes, and in syndication was aired either as part of a block with other cartoons, or with several episodes airing consecutively to fill 30-minute time slots.

== Summary ==
The cartoon features Hercules, the legendary hero, who dwells on Mount Olympus. Villains threaten the people of ancient Greece, often in the kingdom of Calydon, and Hercules comes to the rescue. When in serious danger, he puts on a magic ring which gives him superpowers. Once he puts the ring on and raises his fist, flashes of lightning (referred to as the Thunder of Zeus in several episodes) strike the ring, and Hercules is then endowed with super-strength. He does battle with nemeses such as Daedalus, an evil wizard who is the chief villain (sometimes accompanied by his pet cat Dydo). Other villains include Wilhelmine the Sea Witch (accompanied by her pet bird Elvira) and Murtis, who is invulnerable because he wears an iron helmet known as the Mask of Vulcan.

Hercules's friends and allies are:

- Newton, his main sidekick, a helpful boy centaur who calls Hercules "Herc" and has a habit of repeating himself every time he speaks
- Helena, Hercules's girlfriend
- Prince (later King) Dorian of Calydon
- Tewt, a small satyr who vocalizes only by playing his syrinx
- Timon, a young human from Calydon
- Pegasus, Hercules's winged steed.

Also featured atop Mount Olympus are Hercules's father Zeus and Dodonis with his crystal rock of seeing. Both often warn Hercules of the troubles going on down below in and around the Kingdom of Calydon or deep in the Lernaean Forest.

The original episode has relatively lavish animation by John Gentilella. In it, Hercules beats his friend Theseus in a footrace and a wrestling match, and for his victory Zeus rewards him by promising to grant any request Hercules makes. Hercules wishes to go to Earth to fight evil and injustice, but Zeus reminds him that going to Earth would cause him to lose his godly powers and become a mortal. Zeus then creates a magic ring that allows Hercules access to his godly strength while on Earth. The rest of the episode involves Hercules meeting Helena and fighting a giant named Cacus and the giant's pet dragon. None of the other familiar characters make an appearance in the episode, and it features different character designs for Hercules and Helena.

The show generally used Greek myths as the inspiration for its episodes, but used the influences oddly. Daedalus is the evil wizard who is Hercules's most frequent foe in the cartoon, but in Greek mythology Daedalus was a skilled artisan who was rarely villainous. Cacus, the giant of the first episode, is based on the mythological monster Cacus. Other recurring creatures – such as the Nemean lion, the Lernaean Hydra, the Erymanthian Boar, and the Stymphalian birds — were taken directly from the Twelve Labors of Hercules but, unlike in the Twelve Labors, most of the creatures are not presented in the cartoon as trials for Hercules to overcome.

In addition to the ring, later episodes added new equipment for Hercules and his friends to use, such as a "moonstone beam" in his belt and an invulnerable sword and shield. Episodes invariably ended with Hercules racing towards Mount Olympus and shouting "Olympia!" after defeating the villain.

== Production ==
Adventure Cartoon Productions made The Mighty Hercules in connection with Trans-Lux Television, the same company that later brought the Japanese anime series Speed Racer to audiences in the United States. The company produced 128 episodes of The Mighty Hercules, each approximately five minutes in length. Joe Oriolo was the producer and director, and many of the animators were veterans of the New York City animation scene, including Grim Natwick, Frank Endres, John Gentilella, George Germanetti, Reuben Grossman, and George Rufle. Jack E. Miller, also known as creator and writer for DC Comics, wrote many of the episodes.

The show featured two different sets of voices for the characters. The most noticeably different voice was that of Newton: his original voice sounds as if he has just hit puberty, with his voice constantly cracking, while the later episodes give him a high-pitched Mickey Mouse-like voice. There is no gradual change in the voices. Most of the early episodes have the first set of voices, and the rest have the second set, and in the seventh episode during the first season, "Double Trouble," the voices actually change during the episode, with Newton near the end of the episode speaking a line in his original cracking voice and in his very next line switching to his second, high-pitched voice, while Hercules speaks in his first voice until his final two lines of the episode, which are in Hercules's second voice.

In early episodes of the first season, voice actor David Hartman, who later hosted the television show Good Morning America, voices Hercules before a different actor takes over for the remainder of the series's run; The Mighty Hercules always credits Jimmy Tapp as the voice of Hercules despite Hartman's early portrayal of the character. The series credits Daedalus's voice, depending on the episode, to Jack Mercer or Gerry Bascombe. Early episodes also feature Mercer voicing Newton and other incidental characters. The voice actress for all the female voices is Helene Nickerson. The animation for the sequence of Hercules putting on and charging up his magic ring also changed subtly along with the voices. The episodes "The Minotaur" and "The Chair of Forgetfulness" provide good examples of the first set of voices and the first version of the ring sequence, while the episodes "The Nemean Lion" and "The Chameleon Creature" are good examples of the second set of voices and later ring sequence.

== Music ==
The Mighty Hercules features a theme song sung by Johnny Nash, the American reggae singer-songwriter best known for 1956's "A Very Special Love" and 1972's "I Can See Clearly Now". The theme music is credited to Winston Sharples (as "Win Sharples"), who in more than two decades at Paramount Pictures had composed background music for the Superman (1941) and Popeye theatrical cartoons produced by Fleischer Studios, while the theme's lyrics were written by Sharples's son Winston Sharples, Jr., under the pseudonym "Win Singleton" (his first and middle names).

The transformative "ring anthem" frequently used as Hercules slips on his magic ring, along with several bridges of music used throughout the episodes, were taken from the 1954 film The Black Shield of Falworth, with the music credited to Joseph Gershenson but actually composed by Hans J. Salter, Herman Stein, and Frank Skinner, the longtime in-house film composer for Universal Studios. A cue from Salter's score for The Incredible Shrinking Man was often used in scenes where Hercules is struggling against an antagonist, monster, or other obstacle.

In 2005, The Mighty Hercules was re-issued to television in a newly remastered version and was reformatted, with new title music performed by an unidentified singer replacing the familiar theme music. The version that aired on the Canadian network Teletoon Retro used the original Nash theme music.

== Episode list ==
Season 1
- 1. Hercules Comes to Earth
- 2. Hercules vs. the Hydra
- 3. Hercules and the Stolen Ring
- 4. Hercules and the Magic Arrows
- 5. Daedalus Kidnaps Helena
- 6. Theft of the Magic Seal
- 7. Double Trouble
- 8. Hercules Rescues Timon
- 9. The Chair of Forgetfulness
- 10. The Strength Potion
- 11. Hercules vs. the Hideous Bird Beast
- 12. Pegasus Kidnapped
- 13. The Invisible Potion
- 14. Medusa's Scepter
- 15. Search for the Golden Apple
- 16. The Thieving Bird Hoard
- 17. Daedalus Becomes a Giant
- 18. The Stolen Treasure
- 19. The Cure
- 20. The Thunderbolt Disc
- 21. Sun Diamond of Helios
- 22. Hercules Lends a Hand
- 23. The Defiant Mask of Vulcan
- 24. The Golden Goblet
- 25. The Lexas Lagoon
- 26. Guarding of the Olympic Torch
- 27. Helena Cries Wolf
- 28. Hercules Saves the Villagers
- 29. Hercules and the Magic Arrows
- 30. Hercules Battles the Krudes Beast
- 31. The Cave of Death
- 32. Medusa's Sceptre
- 33. The Bewitch Birds
- 34. The Enchanted Pool
- 35. The Endless Chasm
- 36. Hercules Protects Helena and Newton
- 37. Hercules Helps King Neptune
- 38. The Return of the Mask
- 39. Hercules Saves Helena
- 40. The Magnetic Stone
- 41. The Magic Rod
- 42. The Minotaur
- 43. Hercules and the Eternal Sleep

Season 2
- 44. The Clutching Clay Pool
- 45. Princess Rhea
- 46. The Valley of Whirlwinds
- 47. The Wild Boar
- 48. The Magic Belt of Hercules
- 49. The Errand of Mercy
- 50. The Nemean Lion
- 51. The Magician
- 52. Dorian's Wreath
- 53. The Unicorns
- 54. Wilhelmine
- 55. The Witch and the Magic Ring
- 56. Diomedes' Evil Plot
- 57. Hercules' Unwanted Powers
- 58. The Enchanted Wolf
- 59. Hercules and His Two Rivals
- 60. Hercules Saves the King
- 61. The Thracian Army
- 62. The Gems of Venus
- 63. The Golden Torch
- 64. Hercules vs. Teron, the Evil Spirit
- 65. Hercules Saves the Kingdom
- 66. Kidnapped by Wilhelmine
- 67. The Chameleon Creature
- 68. Earthquake Valley
- 69. Newton the Centaur
- 70. Helena Kidnapped – Hercules to the Rescue
- 71. Hercules and His Friends
- 72. The Magic Sword
- 73. Timon's Grandfather and Hercules
- 74. Hercules Loses His Memory
- 75. The Hall of Justice
- 76. The Cave of Callisto
- 77. The Powerless Hercules
- 78. Omar, the Sultan's Champion
- 79. Sandals of Electra
- 80. The Sea Witch
- 81. The Giant
- 82. Helena's Beauty
- 83. The Island of the Miros Monster
- 84. Hercules and the Fireball
- 85. Hercules Outwits the Magician
- 86. The Evil Weapon

Season 3
- 87. The Giant Ruby
- 88. The Owl Man
- 89. The Chameleon Man
- 90. Hercules Foils the Mask of Vulcan
- 91. The Exploding Diamond
- 92. Hercules and the Sea Witch
- 93. The Magic Lamp
- 94. The Owl-Man of Parnassus
- 95. The Eruption of Mount Sirius
- 96. The Deadly Gift
- 97. The Thesian Thunderhorn
- 98. The Dreaded Beast of Charon
- 99. Hercules, Newton, and the Evil Magician
- 100. The Fiery Abyss
- 101. The Giant Dragonfly
- 102. Tewt's Magic Wand Trouble
- 103. The Wings of Mercury
- 104. The Sea Beast
- 105. Prometheus in Dire Danger
- 106. The Crafty Chameleon
- 107. Kingdom Under the Glass Dome
- 108. The Fantus Beast
- 109. The Lyssidian Locusts
- 110. Hercules Saves Caledon
- 111. Helena's Jinx
- 112. The Sinister Statue
- 113. Friend or Foe of Centaur
- 114. The Young Olympians
- 115. The Feast of Calydon
- 116. The Lava Flow
- 117. The Dreaded Draught
- 118. Underwater Battle
- 119. The Sidian Illusion Stone
- 120. Timon to the Aid of Hercules
- 121. The Fiery Pits of Pyros
- 122. The Clovis Creature
- 123. The Valley of Storms
- 124. The Centaur on Mischief Day
- 125. The Throne of Calydon
- 126. Battle of the Magic Rings
- 127. Diomedes and His Warriors
- 128. King for a Day

== Audio recording ==
In 1963, Golden Records released a tie-in long-playing record for children entitled The Mighty Hercules (LP-108), with words and music by Winston Sharples.

== In popular culture ==
In 2009, the Canadian jazz musician John Stetch covered the theme song from The Mighty Hercules on his album TV Trio.

When doing Superman: The Animated Series, Bruce Timm was inspired by the design of Hercules in what became the design for Superman in the show.

== Broadcast ==
Japan

In Japan, the show was broadcast on Fuji Television from November 4, 1963 to August 29, 1964, and from June 30, 1965 to April 23, 1966. in a 5-minute slot from 6:55 PM, Monday through Saturday. It was sponsored by Meiji Dairy Co.

The theme song featured Japanese lyrics written by Naomi Matsuzaka for the original version and was sung by the Hibari Children's Choir . Transglobal Co. Ltd. handled the dubbing of the Japanese version.

== DVD release ==
On October 4, 2011, Classic Media (now DreamWorks Classics) brought the series to DVD for the first time with a single-disc selection entitled The Mighty Hercules, in Region 1. All 20 episodes are from season 1, the last one being episode 40.
