= Felicita =

Felicita may refer to:

- Felicita (musician), English record producer and DJ
- Felicita (given name), female given name
- Felicita Colombo, 1937 Italian "white-telephones" comedy film directed by Mario Mattoli
- Nonna Felicita, 1938 Italian film directed by Mario Mattoli and starring Dina Galli
- Santa Felicita, (Roman Catholic church in Florence, region of Tuscany, Italy

== See also ==
- Felicità (disambiguation)
