= Adventure Cartoon Productions =

Former animation studio

Adventure Cartoon Productions was a production company that created the cartoon series The Mighty Hercules in 1962. Distributed by Trans-Lux Television, the series then debuted on TV in 1963 and ran until 1966. Joe Oriolo, who produced the TV Felix the Cat series, and Roger Carlin, previously an associate of Jay Ward, were involved in the company; along with Arthur P. Brooks and the colorfully named "Big Sid" Ginsberg. The cartoons were made in New York City, and employed several veteran artists (including freelancers and possibly moonlighters) connected with Paramount Pictures and Terrytoons cartoons. The company used stock music by Winston Sharples derived from his scores for Paramount cartoons of the 1950s, also heard in many other New York-made cartoons of the time.

== List of TV series ==
- The Mighty Hercules
- Johnny Cypher in Dimension Zero
- Felix the Cat
- The Twisted Tales of Felix the Cat
- Baby Felix & Friends
