= HMS Experiment (1793) =

History

Great Britain
- Name: Experiment
- Ordered: 1792
- Builder: John Parkin, Frank's Quarry, Plymouth
- Laid down: 1792
- Launched: May 1793
- Commissioned: June 1793
- Fate: Captured 1796

Spain
- Name: Experimento
- Acquired: 1796 by capture
- Captured: 1806

General characteristics
- Type: Lugger
- Tons burthen: 11111/94 (bm)
- Length: Overall:72 ft 8 in (22.1 m); Keel:56 ft 11 1/2 in (17.4 m)
- Beam: 19 ft 2 in (5.8 m)
- Depth of hold: 9 ft 0 in (2.7 m)
- Propulsion: Sails
- Complement: Royal Navy:45; 1806:30
- Armament: Initially:10 × 3-pounder guns; 1793:10 × 12-pounder carronades + 12 × ½-pounder swivel guns; 1806:4 × 4-pounder guns

HMS Experiment was launched in 1793, the only lugger actually designed and built for the British Royal Navy. The Spanish Navy captured her in 1796 near Gibraltar. A British privateer recaptured her in 1806, but the Royal Navy did not take her back into service.

== Career ==
Experiment was the only lugger specifically designed and built for the Royal Navy, and rather unusually, she had three masts. (The Royal Navy did use a number of hired luggers.

Lieutenant George Hayes commissioned Experiment in June 1793. Lloyd's List reported on 7 March 1794 that the lugger Experiment had taken a Danish brig near Calais. The brig had been carrying a cargo of saltpeter, iron, hemp, and potash.

She was one of 14 vessels that shared in the salvage money from the recapture of Walsingham Packet on 27 September 1795. (The actual captors were HMS Minotaur and Porcupine.)

On 1 August 1796 Experiment, Lieutenant G. Hayes, came into Plymouth. Only fog coming up had enabled her to escape from a brig corvette of 18 guns that was chasing her.

== Capture ==
On 3 October 1796 Experiment was off Cabo de Gata when she sighted a convoy that Hayes believed was under Sir Hyde Parker, whom he knew was in the area. Experiment had been sent to the area to watch for any signs of a French fleet, and Hayes decided to close with the convoy to see if there was any new information. As he did so, a vessel detached itself from the convoy and sailed toward him, but without showing any colours. Hayes was not concerned as he was convinced she was British. He went below to dress in readiness to go aboard the frigate. When he came on deck half an hour later he was horrified to discover that the frigate was not only very close but she was now sailing parallel to Experiment. The frigate then hoisted Spanish colours.

The rest of the fleet was now approaching and it was too late for Experiment to escape. The frigate fired a shot and Hayes struck.

The 40-gun frigate was Santa Sabina. The fleet was under the command of Don Juan de Lángara and had sailed from Cadiz on 26 September. War between Spain and England did not formally begin until 5 October, but since 15 September the British had begun to seize any Spanish vessels coming into British ports. The Spanish took Experiment into service as Experimento. (Note: Experimento's plans are on file in the archives of Madrid's Naval Museum.)

== Recapture ==
The privateer Felicity, Michael Novella, master, recaptured Experiment in February 1806. At the time Experiment was armed with four 4-pounder guns and had a crew of 30 men. Novella also captured a French 3-gun privateer and two Spanish gunboats. (Note: The French privateer was Josephina, of one 18-pounder gun, two 9-pounder carronades, and 37 men. The two Spanish gunboats, №12 and №15, were each armed with one 24-pounder gun, one 36-pounder carronade, and two swivel guns. They also each had 45-man crews under the command of a lieutenant.) Neither Felicity nor Novella appear in a listing of British letters of marque, and Novella reported his captures to Gibraltar, suggesting that perhaps Felicity was a Gibraltar-based privateer.

The Royal Navy did not take Experiment back into service.
