= San Félix =

San Félix may refer to:

- Isla San Félix, one of the Desventuradas Islands, off the coast of Chile
- San Félix District, a district of Chiriquí Province, Panama
  - San Félix, Chiriquí, a corregimiento in San Félix District, Panama
  - San Felix River in San Félix District, Panama
- San Félix, a village in Santiago del Estero Province, Argentina
- San Félix (Tineo), a parish in Tineo, Asturias, Spain
- San Félix de Arce, a hamlet in Leon province of Spain
- San Félix, Venezuela, the old town half of Ciudad Guayana, Bolívar
