= Richard Sandrak =

Ukrainian-born American former bodybuilder

- Річард Сандрак
- Professional bodybuilder

Personal info
- Born: April 15, 1992 (age 34); Luhansk, Ukraine

Best statistics

Richard Sandrak (Note: Ukrainian: Річард Сандрак, romanized: Richard Sandrak) (born April 15, 1992, also known as Little Hercules) is a Ukrainian-born American actor, martial artist, and former bodybuilder known for his muscular physique at an extremely young age, and for his appearance in the documentary The World's Strongest Boy.

== Early life ==
Richard Sandrak was born 15 April 1992, in a small village in Ukraine, to Pavel Sandrak, a martial arts world champion, and Lena Sandrak, an aerobics competitor. In 1994, aged two, he moved with his family to Pennsylvania, United States, where his parents believed he would have a better life. He began his training soon after they arrived. His father, who had trained in taekwondo, introduced him to various stretches and light weight training.

As young as 5 years old Richard would work out with his father seven hours a day doing 600 push-ups and 300 squats. He also had a very strict diet that did not allow junk food or sweets. Instead his diet consisted heavily of protein shakes and vegetables allowing him to have a "claimed" 1% body fat, which many doctors urged is extremely dangerous. Doctors have said body fat this low can cause serious muscle and nerve damage among other health issues including heart failure.

The family subsequently moved to California, with the intention to break into show business. The family met trainer Frank Giardina, while touring one of Giardina's gyms, and hired him to help gain publicity for their son.

During an interview Richard's trainer admitted that there were no toys in the boy's home, he had never visited a playground before and was rarely allowed outside. The fact he was homeschooled meant his parents were able to implement such strict exercise routines.

== Career ==
Sandrak's parents, Pavel and Lena, started him out with light exercises and martial arts techniques which soon progressed into more intense bodybuilding training. At the age of six, he could lift 180 lb (82 kg) on standard bench-press, claiming his title as world's strongest boy and the nickname "little Hercules". By eight, sources claimed he was bench-pressing 210 lb (95 kg).

During his childhood, Sandrak worked out with his father, doing up to 600 push-ups and sit-ups a day, as well as 300 squats. Dedicating all of his time towards training, he never had time to play with friends and experience a typical childhood. Being on a strict diet enforced by his father, Sandrak was never able to eat junk food or any sweets. Sandrak recalls days when his father would eat pizza in front of him, while he was left to eat a head of lettuce. According to Giardina, Sandrak was made to repeat intense exercises as punishment if he got something wrong. Sandrak states his father never forced him into bodybuilding. "I've never been forced to train or do anything against my will", he said. "My parents used to train all the time and I wanted to join in. It was mostly my choice. It's just what I grew up doing. I was never forced. It was never an issue."

Sandrak began travelling across the country to participate in competitions, promotions for nutrition products, and photo shoots for numerous magazines. He also appeared on several TV and radio shows, such as The Howard Stern Show. As he got older his career gradually waned. His Hollywood debut was as the titular character in the 2009 film Little Hercules in 3D.

Giardina quit his functions as trainer and promotor after he came to feel that Pavel's parenting was criminal, and Pavel threatened to kill Giardina. Not long afterwards Pavel was imprisoned for physically assaulting his wife, leaving her with a broken wrist and nose, an event during which Richard called the police. By September 2007, Pavel had been released from prison, though held under psychiatric guidance, and faced the possibility of deportation. Lena and Richard later left Pavel.

A year later, Sandrak was profiled in the documentary The World's Strongest Boy, which detailed his ability to do splits and bench-press three times his own body weight, and claims that less than one percent of his body weight was fat, which can be lethally low. Though medical experts argued that such muscular development requires testosterone that is not found in children younger than ten, and speculated that steroids were involved, Lena Sandrak denied that her son used such substances.

By age 15, Sandrak continued to train five times a week, 90 minutes per session, and ate food more typical of other teens, like pizza. His live-in manager, Marco Garcia, helped to normalize his life and produced Little Hercules in 3-D. Sandrak continued to make more movies, and devoted his time to raising awareness of childhood obesity.

In an Inside Edition interview in 2015, Sandrak said he quit bodybuilding when he became bored with it after his father went to prison, and now does cardio exercises like chin-ups, stair climbing and skateboarding. He said he would like to become a “quantum scientist” and an engineer for NASA.
