= Baby Felix =

Japanese anime television series

- Promotional image illustrating the main character
- Also known as: Baby Felix & Friends
- ベイビーフィリックス
- Created by: Don Oriolo
- Based on: Felix the Cat by Pat Sullivan and Otto Messmer
- Written by: Yasunari Suda; Nobuaki Kishima
- Directed by: Kunitoshi Okajima; Hiroshi Negishi
- Music by: Katsumi Horii
- Countries of origin: Japan; United States
- Original languages: Japanese; English
- No. of episodes: 65 (Japan); 26 (International) (Note: In Japan, the first 13 episodes were 24 minutes long each. From episode 14 onwards, the episodes were reduced to 6 minutes long. In the International version, these 6-minutes 52 episodes were divided into 13 episodes of 4 segments each, totaling 26 episodes.)

Production
- Executive producers: Tetsuya Suzuki; Walter Calmette
- Producer: Don Oriolo
- Animator: Radix
- Editor: Richard Pabis
- Running time: 6–24 minutes
- Production companies: Aeon; NHK Educational; NEC Interchannel; SMEC Media & Entertainment; Felix the Cat Productions

Original release
- Network: NHK
- Release: October 8, 2000 – June 29, 2001

Baby Felix & Friends, known in Japan as Baby Felix (Japanese: ベイビーフィリックス, Hepburn: Beibī Firikkusu), is a preschool animated television series adapted from the stories of the Felix the Cat character. It follows the adventures of a young Felix the Cat and infant versions of the other characters from Joe Oriolo's Felix television program from the 1950s. It is the third Felix television series. It was launched by Oriolo's son, Don Oriolo, in 2000, with NHK Educational, NEC Interchannel, Aeon of Japan and SMEC Media & Entertainment of Taiwan. The show consists of 26 episodes. It follows in the long line of "Baby Cartoon Revivals" alongside such shows as Muppet Babies, Baby Looney Tunes, Tom & Jerry Kids, and The Flintstone Kids.

The series became available on Peacock on July 15, 2020. It is also now available on The Roku Channel.

== Summary ==
The show taked places when Felix was still a small child and was called "Baby Felix". The story begins with a miracle. Baby Felix, who dreams of becoming a Major League baseball player, travels forward in time to his future. There he meets the adult version of himself and discovers that he has become a Major League player. Through many exciting adventures, the two become great friends.

== Voice cast ==
- Baby Felix: Yumi Touma (Japanese voice); Denise NeJame (English voice)
- Felix: Toshihiko Seki (Japanese voice); Don Oriolo (English voice)
- Marin Kitty/Baby Kitty: Ai Maeda (Japanese voice); Jennifer Brassard (English voice)
- Skippy: Motoko Kumai (Japanese voice); Phran Gauci (English voice)
- Mookie: Noko Konoha (Japanese voice); David Chernault (English voice)
- Mimi: Atsuko Enomoto (Japanese voice); Jennifer Brassard (English voice)
- Tattoo: Hisayo Mochizuki (Japanese voice); David Chernault (English voice)
- Bull/Biff: Tesshō Genda (Japanese voice); David Chernault (English voice)
- Dog: Kōichi Nagano (Japanese voice); David Chernault (English voice)
- Zoo: Kōichi Sakaguchi (Japanese voice); David Chernault (English voice)
- Professor: Toshiyuki Morikawa (Japanese voice); David Chernault (English voice)
- Master Cylinder: Kōichi Nagano (Japanese voice); David Chernault (English voice)
- Poindexter: Kappei Yamaguchi (Japanese voice); David Chernault (English voice)
- Marty: Ryūsei Nakao (Japanese voice); Jennifer Brassard (English voice)
- Majorina/Esmeralda: Rei Sakuma (Japanese voice); Jennifer Brassard (English voice)
- Play-by-play Announcer: Showtaro Morikubo (Japanese voice); David Chernault (English voice)

== Characters ==
- Baby Felix: He is a 3-year old kitten, who has a magic bag. He has a crush on Baby Kitty. He often time travels to visit his future self.
- Felix: He is Kitty's love interest. He is the main protagonist alongside his past self. He became a Major League player and often gives Baby Felix a magic bag and tells him to be careful.
- Marin Kitty/Baby Kitty: She is Baby Felix's love interest, and wants to become like the famous Kitty Kat. She's in love with Baby Felix. She and Mimi are friends.
- Skippy: He is a dog who plays baseball with Tattoo. He and Baby Felix know how to play baseball.
- Mookie: He is a mouse who loves to fish. He is one of Baby Felix's pals.
- Mimi: She is a sweet and curious girl. She and Baby Kitty are friends.
- Tattoo: He is a bird who loves to whistle. He plays baseball with Skippy.
- Bull/Biff, Dog and Zoo: They are the mean bulldogs. They want to bully Baby Felix who is having a happy day with Baby Kitty.
- Professor: He is the main antagonist of the series. He wants to steal Baby Felix's magic bag but he fails.
- Master Cylinder: He is The Professor's robot.
- Poindexter: He is The Professor's nephew.
- Marty: He is a Martian who kidnaps Baby Kitty.
- Majorina/Esmeralda: She is a witch who helps Baby Felix fly with a broom.
- Play-by-play Announcer: He is the announcer of Kittenville.

== Episodes ==
Each episode is half-hour long, and they each have four sub-episodes that make a storyline. After two sub-episodes is an in-between "Music-Time" segment (both 'Music-Time' segments are two minutes total).

=== Volume 1: His Magic Bag of Tricks ===
No.	Title	Directed by	Written by	Original release date	Prod. code
1	"Baseball-O-Rama"	TBA	TBA	October 8, 2000 October 15, 2000 October 22, 2000 November 5, 2000	001
Dreaming of baseball: Baby Felix dreams of being a major league baseball player, but he can't seem to win at baseball. The magic mirror takes Baby Felix to the future where he helps his older self win the baseball match.; Who's on First?: The bully boys from the opposing team make Felix fall down, thus hurting his arm so that he can't pitch properly, but then Baby Felix helps Felix by tricking the bully boys.; Who's Present is this?: When Felix wins the match, he is awarded a pendant. Wondering if he still has the pendant, Baby Felix goes through the mirror and finds himself in Felix's house, who ends up causing trouble for him.; Leave it to Baby Felix!: During the game, Felix daydreams about Kitty, which results him getting hit in the face with a baseball that takes him out of the game to recover, so Baby Felix takes his place.
2	"Magic Bag Mania"	TBA	TBA	November 12, 2000 November 19, 2000 December 3, 2000 December 10, 2000	002
I want that magic Bag!: Baby Felix wants to help get a star for Baby Kitty from the night sky. While in bed, Baby Felix notices in the magic mirror that Felix has a magic bag that can do anything. Baby Felix then goes to Felix and asks if he can borrow the bag, but Felix refuses because he tells Baby Felix he's not ready yet.; Dreaming of the magic Bag!: A Reluctant Felix finally gives in and gives Baby Felix the "Baby Bag", but he cannot tell anyone about the magic of the magic bag, or use it for anything bad.; Love my magic Bag!: Baby Felix uses his Baby Bag for "Show and Tell" without revealing its magic. When Mookie falls in a lake, Baby Felix uses his magic bag to save him without anyone seeing the bag transform.; No more Baby Bag!: Baby Felix takes revenge on the bully boys by using his magic bag to melt their ice-cream. As punishment, Felix then confiscates Baby Felix's bag, until he learns to use his magic bag responsibly, unless when it's necessary.
3	"The Professor is Bad News"	TBA	TBA	December 17, 2000 December 24, 2000 January 7, 2001 January 14, 2001	003
Here Comes the Professor!: While playing baseball in the backyard, Baby Felix goes after the ball, but gets teleported into the laboratory of the Professor.; Baby Felix gets Away!: The Professor checks his security cameras to discover that Baby Felix was in his lab. He brings him back to the lab to tell him that he forgot his baseball, but doing so lures Baby Felix into a trap.; Who took the Magic Bag?: The Professor kidnaps Baby Felix and has him trapped until he tells him how to use the magic bag.; Operation Chocolate!: The Professor lures Baby Felix, who is humming after salutes his friends to see him later, to his lab by covering it entirely of chocolate. He then offers him double chocolate sugar puffs if he hands over the magic bag.
4	"The Great Outdoors"	TBA	TBA	January 21, 2001 January 28, 2001 February 4, 2001 February 11, 2001	004
Let's go camping!: Baby Felix and his friends go camping, but have trouble getting there on foot.; Fishing Mookie style!: Baby Felix and Mookie go to the lake to catch some fish to cook, but they have some competition.; The Forest Fairy: When Baby Kitty sees a small green glow, she believes that it's a forest fairy. However, while Baby Felix and his friends go looking for the fairy, they get lost in the forest.; A Lullaby to Sleep By: Mimi can't seem to sleep without her lullaby music, so the gang tries to help her. When Baby Felix helps out with his magic bag, however, an unexpected kind of music puts Mimi to sleep.
5	"Mirror Mirror"	TBA	TBA	February 18, 2001 February 25, 2001 March 4, 2001 March 11, 2001	005
Seven years of Bad Luck!: While playing baseball in the backyard, Baby Felix breaks his window as well as the mirror, which oddly enough has a star-shaped crack and he is scared being punished by Felix.; Which one is Mimi?: Mimi suspects the mirror is magical. She dresses up as a witch and reveals in her secret book that sneezing activates the mirror, which then sends Baby Felix and his friends to the time of dinosaurs.; It's Crystal Clear?: Baby Felix and his friends need to find a large crystal to get them back home.; Let's go home!: Tattoo informs Baby Felix that his friends are stuck in a bottomless swamp, and he needs to save them; luckily, he manages to do so with the help of the dinosaurs.

=== Volume 2: Magic Bag, Do Your Stuff ===
No.	Title	Directed by	Written by	Original release date	Prod. code
1	"Medieval~A~Go~Go"	TBA	TBA	April 30, 2001 May 1, 2001 May 2, 2001 May 3, 2001	001
Adventures in the Old Castle: Through the magic mirror, Baby Felix and his friends are in the middle ages and end up needing to rescue Skippy, being transported on a ship.; Adventure at sea: Baby Felix and his friends get caught by the captain's daughter Annie, who resembles Baby Kitty. She mistakes them as stowaways and chases Baby Felix, but he saves her from falling off.; Beware of Pirate Island!: The ship encounters a real pirate ship led by pirates that look like the bully boys.; Let's get Away!: The pirates haven't given up yet, and plan to wreck the ship. Fortunately, Baby Felix has an idea to save the ship.
2	"Space Case"	TBA	TBA	May 4, 2001 May 7, 2001 May 8, 2001 May 9, 2001	002
Marty the mischievous martian: Baby Felix, Baby Kitty, and Mookie go through the magic mirror and wind up in space in a huge spaceship, where they come face to face with Marty the martian.; All Aboard the galactic Bus: Marty tricks Baby Felix and his friends getting stranded on a galactic bus, but Baby Felix gets back at him by making giant robots, hoping to scare him away.; Tales from the planet Broom: Baby Felix flies in a UFO through the blazing sun and gets saved by Marty, but then lands on an icy planet. The magic bag helps by sending a distress signal for Baby Felix's friends to help rescue them.; Goodbye Marty!: Baby Felix and his friends need to find the large sword to get them back home, but Marty makes it difficult for them by altering the planet into different things, such as the ocean or snowy mountains.
3	"Which Witch is Which?"	TBA	TBA	May 10, 2001 May 11, 2001 May 14, 2001 May 15, 2001	003
Who's that Witch?: Baby Felix and Baby Kitty go through the mirror to find themselves in a witch's lair, but after Baby Felix saves the witch from a mutant crocodile, she becomes curious about his magic.; Esmeralda is her name!: The self-proclaimed 1st class witch Esmeralda enters Baby Felix's house to learn his "magic", and will not leave until she does.; A Broom with a view: Esmeralda gives Baby Felix a ride on her magic broomstick, but she gets caught by the bully boys forcing her to give them her broom, which has no use for them when they try to fly it.; Bye Bye Esmeralda!: The bully boys kick Baby Felix out of the house and force Esmeralda to hand over her broomstick again, but she disposes of them and rescues Baby Felix, then returns to her world, sealing the mirror portal.
4	"Welcome to Adventure Island"	TBA	TBA	May 16, 2001 May 17, 2001 May 18, 2001 May 21, 2001	004
Boat Racing!: Adventure Island is holding a racing competition with four different games, the first of which is boat racing. Baby Felix and Baby Kitty tag together. The bully boys cheat in the race while Baby Felix's magic bag helps overcome their traps.; Hop Hop Hop!: Baby Felix and Skippy team up together in a pogo-stick race and hop to make it to the finish. The bully boys start cheating once again.; Go-cart go!: Baby Felix does go-cart racing, and Mimi assists him to avoid the bully boys' cheating.; Skateboarding madness!: Baby Felix and Mookie tag together in the final game of a competition: skateboarding. The bully boys are cheating again, which results them losing every round.

=== Volume 3: I Want my Chocolate! ===
No.	Title	Directed by	Written by	Original release date	Prod. code
1	"Brain Power"	TBA	TBA	May 22, 2001 May 23, 2001 May 24, 2001 May 25, 2001	001
Hey Pointdexter!: The professor's nephew 'Dexter Pointdexter' has come to visit him. The professor has made a giant robot that can control the weather, but Baby Felix and his magic bag come to the rescue.; Beat the solar Robot!: When Baby Felix ruins the professor's first robot, Pointdexter makes him another one. When they ruin Baby Felix's day with his friends, he destroys their robot again.; Hey I Want my chocolate!: Pointdexter has found Baby Felix's weakness: chocolate, so he and the professor operate a giant robot that attracts chocolate and then melts it, and then it attracts Baby Felix.; Naughty isn't Nice?: After being foiled three times, the professor makes one last robot in the form of Baby Felix; but when it malfunctions, the real Baby Felix doesn't even need his magic bag to take it out.
2	"The Professor Strikes Back"	TBA	TBA	May 28, 2001 May 29, 2001 May 30, 2001 May 31, 2001	002
I Love Chocolate Cake!: Baby Felix goes to the Professor's lab after accidentally crashing one of the windows with a home-run hit. When going to retrieve the ball, however, he discovers two jars of chocolate candies and helps himself to one of them, which causes him to shrink.; A Little at a Time!: After discovering a miniature Baby Felix underneath her picnic basket, Baby Kitty decides to take him home with her to play dress up with Mimi, believing that he is a doll.; Rescue That Robot!: Baby Felix heads back to the Professor, hoping he can return him to his normal size, but he is instead captured by the Professor, who takes his magic bag and sends him into a scrap heap. While there, Baby Felix finds the Master Cylinder, who seems to be in bad shape, and offers to go inside him to find the issue.; What a Big Baby!: Attempting to get back his magic bag, Baby Felix knocks over the two jars of chocolate candies, mixing them together. Both the Professor and Baby Felix chase after each other while using the chocolates to alter their sizes.
3	"Take Me Out to the Ball Game"	TBA	TBA	June 1, 2001 June 4, 2001 June 5, 2001 June 6, 2001	003
Batter Up!: Baby Felix is at a loss after being scolded by Baby Kitty for losing a baseball game. He decides to check in on Felix, only to find that he isn't doing well with his baseball career, either. With quitting on his mind, Felix lets his younger self borrow his magic bag so that he can choose what he wants to be when he grows up.; Let Them Eat Cake!: Using Felix's magic bag, Baby Felix becomes a baker and bakes a delicious cake for his friends. When the bully dogs take and eat their cake slices, however, Baby Felix gets back at them by baking another cake, this time adding spices and other ingredients to make the cake taste terrible.; Ninja Baby!: With the help of Felix's magic bag, Baby Felix becomes a ninja to try and save Princess Kitty, who was being punished for being a bad princess by her captor, the Professor.; Down for the Count!: While Felix is practicing his swings, his magic bag throws Baby Felix into a ring as a wrestler. When faced against the bully dogs, Baby Felix relies on his batting skills to take them on.
4	"Baby Felix's Hijinxs"	TBA	TBA	June 7, 2001 June 8, 2001 June 11, 2001 June 12, 2001	004
Coach Felix: After striking out again at baseball, Baby Felix visits his older self in hopes of perfecting his swings, but he can't seem to hit the ball at all until Felix gets an idea that involves chocolate.; Nothing Comes Easy!: Felix reminds Baby Felix about the proper way to use his baby magic bag and has him promise to keep the bag a secret. Unsure that his younger self will keep his promise, Felix checks in on Baby Felix constantly to stop him from mentioning the secrets of the bag around Baby Kitty.; Up to No Good: The Professor uses a machine to make himself younger, and thus unrecognizable, to try and nab Baby Felix's bag.; Follow the Mysterious S.O.S.: After finding a bottle floating down a river, and discovering the note inside it has Baby Felix, his friends believe that someone is calling out to be rescued. Soon more bottles start appearing out of nowhere.
