= 1925 in animation =

Events in 1925 in animation.

== Events ==
=== February ===
- February 15: Walt Disney's Alice Solves the Puzzle, premiers. The cartoon marks the first appearance of Pete, the oldest recurring Disney character.

== Films released ==
- 1 January:
  - Alice Cans the Cannibals (United States)
  - Felix Wins and Loses (United States)
- 15 January:
  - Alice the Toreador (United States)
  - Felix All Puzzled view (United States)
- 1 February:
  - Alice Gets Stung (United States)
  - Felix Follows the Swallows view (United States)
- 13 February:
  - In Dutch (United States)
  - Jungle Bike Riders (United States)
- 15 February:
  - Alice Solves the Puzzle (United States)
  - Felix Rests in Peace (United States)
- 1 March – Felix Gets His Fill view (United States)
- 13 April – Felix Full O' Fight (United States)
- 27 April – Felix Outwits Cupid (United States)
- 3 May – Opus IV (Germany)
- 8 May – Felix Monkeys with Magic view (United States)
- 17 May – Alice's Egg Plant (United States)
- 25 May – Felix Cops the Prize (United States)
- 8 June – Felix Gets the Can view (United States)
- 15 June – Alice Loses Out (United States)
- 23 June – Alice Gets Stage Struck (United States)
- 12 July – Alice Wins the Derby (United States)
- 20 July – The Window Washers (United States)
- 30 July – Alice Picks the Champ (United States)
- 15 August:
  - Alice's Tin Pony (United States)
  - Felix Dopes it Out view (United States)
- 23 August – Felix the Cat Trifles with Time (United States)
- 28 August – Ugly Duckling (United States)
- 30 August – Alice Chops the Suey (United States)
- 6 September – Felix the Cat Busts into Business (United States)
- 15 September – Alice the Jail Bird (United States)
- 20 September – Felix the Cat Trips thru Toyland (United States)
- 28 September – Closer Than a Brother (United States)
- 4 October – Felix the Cat on the Farm (United States)
- 15 October – Alice Plays Cupid (United States)
- 15 November:
  - Alice Rattled by Rats (United States)
  - Eats are West (United States)
- 29 November – Felix the Cat Tries the Trades (United States)
- 13 December – Felix the Cat at the Rainbow's End (United States)
- 15 December – Alice in the Jungle (United States)
- 27 December – Felix the Cat Kept on Walking (United States)

== Births ==
=== January ===
- January 2: Larry Harmon, American clown (played himself in Bozo: The World's Most Famous Clown, voice of Stan Laurel in Laurel and Hardy), (d. 2008).
- January 5: Sparky Moore, American animator and comics artist (did lay-outs for Hanna-Barbera and Cambria Productions), (d. 2016).
- January 11: Kihachirō Kawamoto, Japanese puppet designer, animator and film director (The Book of the Dead), (d. 2010).
- January 26:
  - Oliver Passingham, British comics artist and animator, (d. 2003).
  - Paul Newman, American actor, film director, race car driver and entrepreneur (voice of Doc Hudson in Cars and Cars 3, voiced himself in The Simpsons episode "The Blunder Years"), (d. 2008).
- January 28: Yasuji Mori, Japanese animator (Toei Animation) and director (The Little Prince and the Eight-Headed Dragon), (d. 1992).

=== February ===
- February 3: John Fiedler, American actor (voice of Piglet in Winnie the Pooh, Father Sexton in Robin Hood, Porcupine in The Fox and the Hound, Rudy in The Emperor's New Groove), (d. 2005).
- February 8: Jack Lemmon, American actor (voice of Frank Ormand in The Simpsons episode "The Twisted World of Marge Simpson"), (d. 2001).
- February 11: Marvin Stein, American comics artist, animator and illustrator, (d. 2010).
- February 14: Norma Swank-Haviland, American ink and paint artist (The Three Caballeros) and actor (voice of Angry Woman in Crowd in Make Mine Music, Mice in Cinderella, second voice of Chip), (d. 2022).
- February 17: Hal Holbrook, American actor (voice of Amphitryon in Hercules, Cranston in Cats Don't Dance, Mayday in Planes: Fire & Rescue), (d. 2021).
- February 18: George Kennedy, American actor (voice of L.B. Mammoth in Cats Don't Dance), (d. 2016).

=== March ===
- March 1: Dan Danglo, American animator (Terrytoons, Famous Studios, Warner Bros. Animation, Hanna-Barbera), (d. 2020).
- March 5: Stig Lasseby, Swedish animator, director, animation producer (Agaton Sax, Peter-No-Tail) and actor (Tänkande August in Agaton Sax), (d. 1996).
- March 20: Bill Lignante, American comics artist, courtroom sketch artist and animator (Hanna-Barbera), (d. 2018).
- March 23: Robie Lester, American actress (voice of Miss Jessica in Santa Claus Is Comin' to Town, singing voice for Eva Gabor in The Aristocats and The Rescuers), (d. 2005).
- March 25: Elmer Dresslar Jr., American actor (voice of the Jolly Green Giant), (d. 2005).

=== April ===
- April 12: Oliver Postgate, British animator, puppeteer and television writer (narrator and additional voices in Ivor the Engine and Noggin the Nog, co-creator of Bagpuss), co-founder of Smallfilms, (d. 2008).
- April 14:
  - Harold M. Schulweis, American rabbi and author (special technical consultant for The Simpsons episode "Like Father, Like Clown"), (d. 2014).
  - Rod Steiger, American actor (voice of Captain Tenille in The Simpsons episode "Simpson Tide", himself in The Critic episode "L.A. Jay"), (d. 2002).
  - Woody Kling, American television writer (The Littles, Rainbow Brite), (d. 1988).
- April 18: Bob Hastings, American actor (voice of Commissioner Gordon in the DC Animated Universe, Superboy in The Adventures of Superboy, Henry Glopp in Jeannie, D.D. in Clue Club), (d. 2014).
- April 25: Kay E. Kuter, American actor (voice of Grimsby in The Little Mermaid franchise, Santa Claus in Annabelle's Wish, Ego the Living Planet in the Fantastic Four episode "To Battle the Living Planet"), (d. 2003).
- April 26: Leo De Lyon, American actor (voice of Spook and Brain in Top Cat, Flunky in The Jungle Book), (d. 2021).
- April 29: Iwao Takamoto, American animator, film director, television producer and character designer (Walt Disney Company, Hanna-Barbera), (d. 2007).

=== May ===
- May 10: Albert Jaminon, Belgian painter, sculptor, comic artist, animator and educator (worked for Belvision), (d. 2006).
- May 14:
  - Alvin Epstein, American actor and director (voice of Bookseller in Beauty and the Beast), (d. 2018).
  - Ysanne Churchman, English actress (provided additional voices for The Twelve Tasks of Asterix), (d. 2024).
- May 20: Horst Alisch, German illustrator, comics artist and animator, (d. 2020).
- May 24: Babette DeCastro, American singer (Bird and Animal voices in Song of the South), (d. 1992).

=== June ===
- June 3: Tony Curtis, American actor (voice of Stony Curtis in The Flintstones episode "The Return of Stony Curtis", TV Interviewer in Sparky's Magic Piano, Bernard in Roxanne's Best Christmas Ever), (d. 2010).
- June 4: Joe Hale, American animator (Sleeping Beauty, The Black Cauldron, The Great Mouse Detective, Robin Hood, Mickey's Christmas Carol), producer (The Black Cauldron) and screenwriter (The Black Cauldron), (d. 2025).
- June 10: Yefim Gamburg, Russian film director (Passion of Spies, Ograblenie po..., Blue Puppy, Dog in Boots), (d. 2000).
- June 16: Servais Tiago, Portuguese comics artist and animator, (d. 2018).
- June 18: Johnny Pearson, British composer (Captain Pugwash), (d. 2011).
- June 25: June Lockhart, American actress (voice of Martha Day in These Are the Days, Mother in Peter-No-Tail, Aladdin's Mother in Aladdin and the Wonderful Lamp, Aunt Millie in the Pound Puppies episode "How to Found a Pound", Vesta in Wildfire, Mrs. Nelson in the Duckman episode "America the Beautiful", Mrs. Brainchild in The Ren & Stimpy Show episode "Blazing Entrails", Timmy's Mother in the Johnny Bravo episode "Johnny, Real Good", herself in The Critic episode "All the Duke's Men"), (d. 2025).

=== July ===
- July 7: Jan Svochak, Czech-American animator (Famous Studios, Pelican, Elektra, Zanders, Perpetual Motion Pictures, Buzzco, J.J. Sedelmaier Productions, the Punchy advertisements), (d. 2006).
- July 11: David Graham, English actor (voice of Gordon Tracy in the Thunderbirds franchise, Grandpa Pig in Peppa Pig, Wise Old Elf in Ben & Holly's Little Kingdom, Dr. Horatio Beaker in Supercar, Professor Matthew Matic in Fireball XL5, The Brown Bear in Stowaways on the Ark, Snork in Moomin), (d. 2024).
- July 20: Andrzej Pawłowski, Polish painter, sculptor, photographer, and film director (Kineformy, Naturally Shaped Forms, Mannequins), (d. 1986).
- July 23: Magdalo Mussio, Italian animator, (d. 2006).
- July 26: Zdeněk Smetana, Czech animator, film director and graphic artist (worked for Jiri Trnka, Gene Deitch, The End of A Cube), (d. 2016).

=== August ===
- August 8: Ginny Tyler, American actress (voice of Jan in Space Ghost, Sue Storm / Invisible Woman in The New Fantastic Four, the female squirrel in The Sword in the Stone, Davey's mother and sister in Davey and Goliath), (d. 2012).
- August 11: Jerome Coopersmith, American dramatist ('Twas the Night Before Christmas), (d. 2023).
- August 13: Jane Webb, American film, radio, and voice actress (Filmation), (d. 2010).
- August 16: Branco Karabajic, Croatian comics artist and animator (worked on Veliki Mitting), (d. 2003).
- August 19: Chumei Watanabe, Japanese composer (Mazinger Z, Godannar, Getter Robo Go, Transformers: Victory), (d. 2022).
- August 30: Laurent de Brunhoff, French author and writer (Babar: The Movie), (d. 2024).

=== September ===
- September 2: Ronnie Stevens, British actor (narrator and additional voices in Noggin the Nog), (d. 2006).
- September 12: Bengt Feldreich, Swedish television presentator, journalist and actor (narrator in From All of Us to All of You), (d. 2019).
- September 14: Rick Reinert, American animator, film director and producer (MGM, Walt Disney Animation Studios, Rick Reinert Productions), (d. 2018).
- September 15: Peggy Webber, American actress (voice of Elderberry in The Smurfs), (d. 2026).
- September 20: Roland Dupree, American actor, dancer, and choreographer (live-action model for the title character in Peter Pan), (d. 2015).
- September 24: Eve Brenner, American actress (voice of the Mouse Queen in The Great Mouse Detective).
- September 27: J. Robert Harris, American composer (theme from Spider-Man), (d. 2000).

=== October ===
- October 1: Bradley Bolke, American actor (voice of Chumley the Walrus in Underdog), (d. 2019).
- October 3: Gore Vidal, American writer and public intellectual (voiced himself in the Family Guy episode "Mother Tucker", and The Simpsons episode "Moe'N'a Lisa"), (d. 2012).
- October 12: Charles Gordone, American playwright, actor, director, educator, and actor (voice of Preacher Fox in Coonskin), (d. 1995).
- October 13: Heino Pars, Estonian film director (d. 2014).
- October 16: Angela Lansbury, Irish-English actress and singer (portrayed Miss Eglantine Price in Bedknobs and Broomsticks and Balloon Lady in Mary Poppins Returns, voice of Sister Theresa in The First Christmas, Mommy Fortuna in The Last Unicorn, Mrs. Potts in the Beauty and the Beast franchise, Narrator/The Dowager Empress Marie in Anastasia, Grandmamma in Heidi 4 Paws, Mayor McGerkle in The Grinch), (d. 2022).
- October 23: Johnny Carson, American television host, comedian, writer and producer (voiced himself in The Simpsons episode "Krusty Gets Kancelled"), (d. 2005).

=== November ===
- November 11:
  - Jonathan Winters, American actor and comedian (voice of Mr. Freebus and Roger Gustav in The Completely Mental Misadventures of Ed Grimley, Grandpa and Papa Smurf in The Smurfs franchise, Coach Cadaver in Gravedale High, Wade Pig in Tiny Toon Adventures: How I Spent My Summer Vacation, The Thief in Arabian Knight, narrator in Frosty Returns, Santa Claus in Santa vs. the Snowman 3D, Old Clown in the Johnny Bravo episode "I Used to Be Funny", Sappy Stanley in the Tiny Toon Adventures episode "Who Bopped Bugs Bunny?", Stinkbomb D. Basset in the Animaniacs episode "Smell Ya Later", himself and Maude Frickert in The New Scooby-Doo Movies episode "The Frikert Fracas"), (d. 2013).
  - June Whitfield, English radio, television and film actress (voice of Mrs. Rabbit in The World of Peter Rabbit and Friends, and Judge Pikelet in the Rex the Runt episode "The Trials of Wendy"), (d. 2018).
- November 17: Walt Peregoy, American artist (Walt Disney Productions, Format Films, Hanna-Barbera), (d. 2015).
- November 22: Miki Muster, Slovenian sculptor, illustrator, comics artist and animator (Bavaria Film, made cartoons based on the work of Guillermo Mordillo and Manfred Schmidt's Nick Knatterton), (d. 2018).

=== December ===
- December 8: Sammy Davis Jr., American singer, dancer, actor, comedian, film producer and television director (voice of Cheshire Cat in The New Alice in Wonderland, Head Ratte in Heidi's Song), (d. 1990).
- December 12: Warren Tufts, American comics artist, animator and actor (Cambria Studios, Hanna-Barbera) (d. 1982).
- December 13: Dick Van Dyke, American actor, comedian, writer, singer, and dancer (host of CBS Cartoon Theatre, portrayed Bert in Mary Poppins, voice of the title character in Tubby the Tuba, the narrator in The Town Santa Forgot, Webb in The Alan Brady Show, Jim Gordon in Batman: New Times, Mr. Bloomsberry in Curious George, Captain Goof-Beard in the Mickey Mouse Clubhouse episode "Mickey's Pirate Adventure", himself in The New Scooby-Doo Movies episode "The Haunted Carnival", and The Simpsons episode "McMansion & Wife").
- December 19: Robert B. Sherman, American songwriter and composer (Walt Disney Animation Studios, Snoopy Come Home, Charlotte's Web, The Mighty Kong), (d. 2012).

== Deaths ==
=== May ===
- May 19: Viking Eggeling, Swedish avant-garde artist and filmmaker, pioneer of abstract animation (directed the animated short film Symphonie diagonale), dies at age 44.

=== August ===
- August 23: Constantin Philipsen, Danish filmmaker, (toured Scandinavian nations from 1898 with his magic lantern; opened Denmark's first viable cinema, the 158-seat Kosmorama in 1904, in Copenhagen), dies at age 65.
