= 2000 in animation =

2000 in animation is an overview of notable events, including notable awards, list of films released, television show debuts and endings, and notable deaths.

== Events ==
=== January ===
- January 1: The website Homestar Runner goes up.
- January 6: The film Cóndor Crux, la leyenda premieres.
- January 12: South Park concludes its third season on Comedy Central with the episode "World Wide Recorder Concert", this was the first episode to premiere in the 2000s. It was watched by over 2 million viewers that night.
- January 14: The Simpsons receive a star at the Hollywood Walk of Fame.

=== February ===
- February 6: The Walt Disney Company releases The Tigger Movie.
- February 26: The first episode of The Weekenders airs.
- February 29: The Walt Disney Company releases An Extremely Goofy Movie. This serves as the finale to the television series Goof Troop.
- Specific date unknown: Titmouse, Inc is founded.

=== March ===
- March 9: The animated TV series God, the Devil and Bob is first broadcast, but was cancelled after four episodes over its satirical portrayal of God and Satan.
- March 19: The Simpsons episode "Bart to the Future" premieres. It has a throwaway joke about Donald Trump being President of the United States in the future and causing a budget crisis, which gained more attention when Trump became president in 2017 and the episode was accused of unintentionally predicting the future.
- March 26: 72nd Academy Awards:
  - The Old Man and the Sea by Alexander Petrov wins the Academy Award for Best Animated Short Film.
  - "You'll Be in My Heart" from Tarzan by Phil Collins wins the Academy Award for Best Original Song.
- March 31: The Road to El Dorado premieres.

=== April ===
- April 1: Cartoon Network's sister channel Boomerang launches.
- April 3: The first episode of Between the Lions airs.
- April 5: Season 4 of South Park begins on Comedy Central with the premiere of the episode "The Tooth Fairy's Tats 2000". This episode marks the debut of the character Timmy Burch.

=== May ===
- May 19: The Walt Disney Company releases Dinosaur. This marks the first Disney animated feature to receive the PG rating since The Black Cauldron in 1985.
- May 21:
  - King of the Hill concludes its fourth season on Fox with episode "Peggy's Fan Fair", which was seen by over 7.2 million viewers that night.
  - The Simpsons concludes its eleventh season on Fox with episode "Behind the Laughter", which was seen by over 13.8 million viewers that night.
- May 22: Cartoon Network Studios opened in Burbank, California.

=== June ===
- June 16: Don Bluth and Gary Goldman's Titan A.E. is released, but becomes a box office flop, gaining $36.8 million against a $75–90 million budget and resulting in a $100 million loss for 20th Century Fox. Due to the failure of the film, Fox Animation Studios was shut down afterward.
- June 23: Peter Lord and Nick Park's Chicken Run premieres. It is the first feature-length film of Aardman Animation.

=== July ===
- July 7: June Foray receives a star on the Hollywood Walk of Fame.
- July 10: The film Heavy Metal 2000, a sequel to the 1981 film Heavy Metal, is released.
- July 22: The film The Boy Who Saw the Wind premieres.
- July 25:
  - The final episode of the animated sitcom adaptation of Scott Adams' newspaper comic Dilbert is broadcast: Dilbert.
  - Don Hertzfeldt's Rejected premieres.
  - Universal Cartoon Studios releases An American Tail: The Mystery of the Night Monster, the final installment to An American Tail. Universal discontinued the franchise as the studio would then work on direct-to-video sequels based on Balto.
- July 29: The film Blood: The Last Vampire premieres at the 5th annual International Festival of Fantasy, Action and Genre Cinema, nicknamed Fantasia 2000, in Montreal. The film airs in Australia on August 26, 2000, at the Sydney 2000 Olympic Arts Festival. It makes its theatrical debut in its home country of Japan on November 16, 2000.

=== August ===
- August 1: Family Guy concludes its second season on Fox with the episode "Fore, Father", which was seen by over six million viewers that night.
- August 14: The first episode of Dora the Explorer airs.
- August 18: The pilot episode of Sheep in the Big City is broadcast.
- August 26: The pilot episode of Generation O! is broadcast.
- August 29: Monster Mash is first released.

=== September ===
- September 3: The first episode of Playboy's Dark Justice, a computer-animated pornographic series, is broadcast.
- September 4: The first episode of Clifford the Big Red Dog airs.
- September 9:
  - The first episode of Jackie Chan Adventures airs, an animated TV series based on martial arts actor Jackie Chan.
  - The first episode of Teacher's Pet is broadcast.
- September 15: The film Titanic: The Legend Goes On is released. It would later gain notoriety for its low quality and rapping dog character.
- September 18: The Walt Disney Company announces they would be selling DIC Entertainment through a management buyout backed up through Bain Capital.
- September 23: The first episode of Static Shock airs.
- Specific date unknown: Corus Entertainment buys Nelvana

=== October ===
- October 1: Season 5 of King of the Hill begins on Fox with the premiere of the episode "The Perils of Polling", which was seen by just nearly 9.6 million viewers that night.
- October 2: The first episode of Buzz Lightyear of Star Command airs.
- October 3: Scooby-Doo and the Alien Invaders is released, receiving positive reviews. This is the final time Mary Kay Bergman would voice Daphne as the film is dedicated to her memory. Grey DeLisle would later take the role for the character in the next film.
- October 6:
  - Digimon: The Movie premieres.
  - Help! I'm a Fish is first released.
- October 9: The Arthur episode "It's a No-Brainer" airs. It was withdrawn from circulation 21 years later.
- October 20: Season 2 of SpongeBob SquarePants begins on Nickelodeon with the premiere of the episodes "Something Smells/Bossy Boots". Starting with this season, the show's animation style switches from cel animation to digital ink and paint.
- October 21: The film Ah! My Goddess: The Movie is released.
- October 24: The first episode of Pelswick airs, based on John Callahan's cartoons.
- October 25: The first episode of As Told by Ginger airs.
- October 27: Pettson och Findus - Kattonauten, based on the Pettson and Findus book series, is released.
- October 31: The film Gen^{13} is released.
- Specific date unknown: The film Vampire Hunter D: Bloodlust is released.

=== November ===
- November 1: Season 12 of The Simpsons begins on Fox with the premiere of the latest Treehouse of Horror installment "Treehouse of Horror XI", which was seen by over 13.2 million viewers that night.
- November 5: The Simpsons' 250th episode "A Tale of Two Springfields" premieres on Fox, featuring the following guest stars: Roger Daltrey, John Entwistle, Paul Townshend (playing his brother Pete Townshend) & Gary Coleman. The episode was seen by over 16.1 million viewers that night.
- November 7: The film Joseph: King of Dreams is released, a sequel to The Prince of Egypt.
- November 7–9: The three-part Rugrats special "Acorn Nuts & Diapey Butts" premieres on Nickelodeon, these episodes serve as the prologue to Rugrats in Paris: The Movie.
- November 13: The Arthur episode "Bitzi's Beau" airs. This marks the earliest depiction of Mr. Ratburn getting married, but only in a fantasy sequence as being straight. His actual marriage occurs in the later episode "Mr. Ratburn and the Special Someone", over 20 years of being closeted.
- November 14: 3-2-1 Penguins! is released in direct-to-video format.
- November 17:
  - Paramount Pictures and Nickelodeon's Rugrats in Paris: The Movie, is released. It marks the debuts of Kimi Watanabe her mother Kira and their dog Fifi who will all become part of the show's cast. It received positive reviews over its predecessor.
  - Cartoon Network’s Sheep in the Big City airs. This program became coveted long after its cancellation in 2002.
- November 25: The CatDog made-for-TV movie "CatDog and the Great Parent Mystery", premieres on Nickelodeon.

=== December ===
- December 7: The SpongeBob SquarePants holiday special episode "Christmas Who?" premieres on Nickelodeon.
- December 12: Batman Beyond: Return of the Joker is released direct-to-video. The film caused controversy for its violent content, including the Joker's death. As a result, the film was censored and the uncut version was not released until 2002.
- December 14: The film The Magic Pudding is first released.
- December 15: The Walt Disney Company releases The Emperor's New Groove.
- December 20: South Park concludes its fourth season on Comedy Central with the Christmas special "A Very Crappy Christmas", this was the last episode to premiere during the 20th century. It was seen by over 3 million viewers that night.
- December 21: Cartoon Network began airing adult oriented programs during 4am and 5am, including Sealab 2021, Harvey Birdman, Attorney at Law, Aqua Teen Hunger Force, and The Brak Show, all were unannounced and continued to air for ten nights. Cartoon Network would launch Adult Swim later in the following year.
- December 23: Pandavas: The Five Warriors, the first Indian computer animated film, is released.
- December 27: Let's All Go to the Lobby and Porky in Wackyland are added to the National Film Registry.

=== Specific date unknown ===
- Per Åhlin's The Dog Hotel is first released.
- Michaël Dudok de Wit's Father and Daughter is first released.
- Happy Tree Friends first airs online.

== Films released ==
- January 6 - Condor Crux, the Legend (Spain and Argentina)
- January 26 - Princes and Princesses (France)
- February 11:
  - Circleen: Mice and Romance (Denmark)
  - The Tigger Movie (United States and Japan)
- February 18 - Sinbad: Beyond the Veil of Mists (India and United States)
- February 21 - Soreike! Anpanman: Kieta Jam Oji-san (Japan)
- February 29 - An Extremely Goofy Movie (United States)
- March 4:
  - Doraemon: Nobita and the Legend of the Sun King (Japan)
  - One Piece: The Movie (Japan)
- March 10 - Hundhotellet (Sweden)
- March 11 - The Great Easter Egg Hunt (United States)
- March 31:
  - The Road to El Dorado (United States)
  - The Miracle Maker (Russia and United Kingdom)
- April 1 - VeggieTales: King George and the Ducky (United States)
- April 4 - Tom Sawyer (United States)
- April 22:
  - Case Closed: Captured in Her Eyes (Japan)
  - Crayon Shin-chan: Rumble in the Jungle (Japan)
- May 19 - Dinosaur (United States)
- May 24 - The New Bremen Town Musicians (Russia)
- May 26 - Odwrocona gora albo film pod strasznym tytułem (Poland)
- June 13 - Aladdin and the Adventure of All Time (United States and Philippines)
- June 16 - Titan A.E. (United States)
- June 23 - Chicken Run (United Kingdom and United States)
- June 24 - Escaflowne (Japan)
- June 30 - The Adventures of Rocky and Bullwinkle (United States)
- July - Vampire Hunter D: Bloodlust (Japan)
- July 6 - Heart, the Joys of Pantriste (Argentina)
- July 8 - Pokémon 3: The Movie Entei-Spell of the Unknown (Japan)
- July 10 - Heavy Metal 2000 (Canada and Germany)
- July 13 - The Rescue by Pintin (Argentina)
- July 14 - Leif Erickson, Discoverer of North America (United States)
- July 15 - Cardcaptor Sakura Movie 2: The Sealed Card (Japan)
- July 22 - The Boy Who Saw the Wind (Japan)
- July 28 - Lupin III: Missed by a Dollar (Japan)
- July 29 - Soreike! Anpanman Ningyohime no Namida (Japan)
- August 8 - Buzz Lightyear of Star Command: The Adventure Begins (United States)
- August 22 - The Scarecrow (United States)
- August 25 - Lion of Oz (Canada, United Kingdom and United States)
- August 27 - Is It Fall Yet? (United States and South Korea)
- August 29:
  - Alvin and the Chipmunks Meet the Wolfman (United States)
  - Monster Mash (Italy and United States)
- August 31 - Street Fighter Alpha: The Animation (Japan)
- September 12 - Tweety's High-Flying Adventure (United States)
- September 15 - Titanic: The Legend Goes On (Italy)
- September 19 - The Little Mermaid II: Return to the Sea (United States)
- September 30 - VeggieTales: Esther... The Girl Who Became Queen (United States)
- October 2 - The Island of the Crab (Spain)
- October 3 - Scooby-Doo and the Alien Invaders (United States)
- October 6:
  - CyberWorld (United States)
  - Digimon: The Movie (Japan and United States)
  - Help! I'm a Fish (Germany, Ireland, and Denmark)
- October 17 - Franklin and the Green Knight (Canada)
- October 21 - Ah! My Goddess: The Movie (Japan)
- October 27 - Pettson och Findus – Kattonauten (Sweden)
- October 31:
  - Casper's Haunted Christmas (Canada)
  - The Life & Adventures of Santa Claus (United States)
- November 7 - Joseph: King of Dreams (United States)
- November 11 - The Tangerine Bear (United States)
- November 14 - Miracle in Toyland (United States)
- November 17 - Rugrats in Paris: The Movie (United States and Germany)
- November 18 - Blood: The Last Vampire (Japan)
- November 27 - Prop and Berta (Denmark and Latvia)
- December 1 - Marco Antonio, rescate en Hong Kong (Spain)
- December 5:
  - The Land Before Time VII: The Stone of Cold Fire (United States)
  - The Last Mystery of the 20th Century (Japan)
- December 10 - The Emperor's New Groove (United States)
- December 12 - Batman Beyond: Return of the Joker (United States)
- December 14 - The Magic Pudding (Australia)
- December 15 - The Thief of Dreams (Spain)
- December 20 - One Piece TV Special: Adventure in the Ocean's Navel (Japan)
- December 21 - Beauty and Warrior (Indonesia)
- December 23 - Pandavas: The Five Warriors (Russia)
- December 30 - Pokémon: Mewtwo Returns (Japan)
- Specific date unknown:
  - Alpamysh (Uzbekistan)
  - Duck Ugly (France and Ireland)
  - The Four Seasons (Hungary)
  - Jesus: A Kingdom Without Frontiers (Italy)
  - Lotte's Journey South (Estonia)
  - Nien Resurrection (Malaysia)
  - Optimus Mundus (Russia)
  - The Prince of Dinosaurs (Italy)
  - Read or Die (Japan)
  - Redwall: The Movie (Canada)
  - Robin and the Dreamweavers (United States)

== Television series debuts ==
Date	Title	Channel	Year
January 8	Rainbow Fish	HBO	2000
February 1	Poochini	Syndication	2000–2003
February 26	Max Steel	Kids' WB	2000–2002
February 26	The Weekenders	ABC, Toon Disney	2000–2004
March 6	Mobile Suit Gundam Wing	Cartoon Network	2000
March 9	God, the Devil and Bob	NBC	2000
April 2	JBVO	Cartoon Network	2000–2001
April 3	Between the Lions	PBS Kids	2000–2010
April 5	Exposure	Syfy	2000–2002
April 14	The Bob Clampett Show	Cartoon Network	2000–2001
May 31	Clerks: The Animated Series	ABC, Comedy Central	2000–2002
June 17	Cardcaptors	Kids' WB	2000–2001
June 26	Spy Groove	MTV	2000–2002
July 6	Hand Maid May	Wowow	2000
July 7	Dinozaurs	Fox Kids	2000
July 28	Baby Blues	The WB, Adult Swim	2000–2002
August 5	Action Man (2000)	Fox Kids	2000–2001
August 8	Sammy	NBC	2000
August 14	Dora the Explorer	Nickelodeon	2000–2019
August 26	Maggie and the Ferocious Beast	Nick Jr.	2000–2002
August 26	Generation O!	Kids' WB	2000–2001
September 3	Playboy's Dark Justice	Playboy TV	2000–2001
September 4	Clifford the Big Red Dog	PBS Kids	2000–2003
September 8	The New Adventures of Madeline	Playhouse Disney	2000–2001
September 9	Jackie Chan Adventures	Kids' WB	2000–2005
September 9	Teacher's Pet	ABC, Toon Disney	2000–2002
September 9	Kong: The Animated Series	Syndication	2000–2001
September 9	George Shrinks	PBS Kids	2000–2003
September 18	Fetch the Vet	ITV (CITV)	2000–2001
September 23	Static Shock	Kids' WB	2000–2004
September 30	Corduroy	PBS Kids	2000–2001
September 30	Marvin the Tap-Dancing Horse	PBS Kids	2000–2002
September 30	Seven Little Monsters	PBS Kids	2000–2003
September 30	Timothy Goes to School	PBS Kids	2000–2001
October 2	Buzz Lightyear of Star Command	ABC, UPN	2000–2001
October 14	Pokémon: The Johto Journeys	Kids' WB	2000–2001
October 24	Pelswick	Nickelodeon	2000-2002
October 25	As Told by Ginger	Nickelodeon	2000–2006
November 4	X-Men: Evolution	Kids' WB	2000–2003
November 6	Blue Submarine No.6	Cartoon Network	2000
November 6	D'Myna Leagues	YTV, CTV	2000–2004
November 13	3-2-1 Penguins!	Direct to video	2000–2008
November 17	Sheep in the Big City	Cartoon Network	2000–2002
December 6	TV Funhouse	Comedy Central	2000–2001
December 21	The Brak Show	Cartoon Network, Adult Swim	2000–2003
December 21	Sealab 2021	Cartoon Network, Adult Swim	2000–2005
December 30	Aqua Teen Hunger Force	Cartoon Network, Adult Swim	2000–2015
December 30	Harvey Birdman, Attorney at Law	Cartoon Network, Adult Swim	2000–2007

== Television series endings ==
Date	Title	Channel	Year	Notes
January 8	The Brothers Flub	Nickelodeon	1999–2000	Cancelled
January 22	Science Court	ABC	1997–2000	Cancelled
January 22	Flying Rhino Junior High	CBS	1998–2000	Cancelled
January 30	Ace Ventura: Pet Detective	CBS, Nickelodeon	1995–2000	Ended
February 12	Superman: The Animated Series	Kids' WB	1996–2000	Ended
February 12	The New Batman/Superman Adventures	Kids' WB	1997–2000	Cancelled
February 16	Noddy	PBS Kids	1998–2000	Ended
February 22	Archie's Weird Mysteries	PAX TV	1999–2000	Ended
February 26	The Avengers: United They Stand	Fox Kids	1999–2000	Ended
February 27	Sabrina: The Animated Series	ABC, UPN	1999–2000	Ended
March 2	I Am Weasel	Cartoon Network	1997–2000	Ended
March 25	Detention	Kids' WB	1999–2000	Cancelled
March 28	God, the Devil and Bob	NBC	2000	Cancelled; remaining episodes aired in 2011 on Adult Swim.
March 31	Histeria!	Kids' WB	1998–2000	Cancelled
April 1	Crashbox	HBO	1999–2000	Cancelled
April 3	Roughnecks: Starship Troopers Chronicles	Syndication	1999–2000	Cancelled
April 22	Godzilla: The Series	Fox Kids	1998–2000	Cancelled
May 1	George and Martha	HBO	1999–2000	Cancelled
May 2	Totally Tooned In	Syndication	1999–2000	Cancelled
May 5	A Little Curious	HBO	1999–2000	Cancelled
May 11	Mobile Suit Gundam Wing	Cartoon Network	2000	Cancelled
May 27	KaBlam!	Nickelodeon	2000	Cancelled
June 3	Roswell Conspiracies: Aliens, Myths and Legends	Syndication	1999–2000	Cancelled
June 24	Pokémon: Indigo League	Syndication, Kids' WB	1998–2000	Ended
July 18	Happily Ever After: Fairy Tales for Every Child	HBO	1995–2000	Ended
July 25	Dilbert	UPN	1999–2000	Cancelled
August 15	Sammy	NBC	2000	Cancelled
September 2	The Bugs Bunny Show	ABC, CBS	1960–2000	Ended
September 20	Elliot Moose	PBS	1998 - 2000	Ended
September 29	Tenchi in Tokyo	Cartoon Network	2000	Cancelled
October 14	Pokémon: Adventures in the Orange Islands	Kids' WB	1999–2000	Ended
October 15	PB&J Otter	Playhouse Disney	1998–2000	Ended
November 9	Blue Submarine No. 6	Cartoon Network	2000	Ended
November 16	Sailor Moon	Syndication, Cartoon Network	1995–2000	Ended
November 18	Pepper Ann	ABC, UPN	1997–2000	Ended
November 18	Beast Machines: Transformers	Fox Kids	1999–2000	Cancelled
November 18	Rainbow Fish	HBO	2000	Cancelled
December 16	Mickey Mouse Works	ABC	1999–2000	Cancelled
December 17	Adventures from the Book of Virtues	PBS Kids	1996–2000	Ended

== Television season premieres ==
Date	Title	Season	Channel
March 18	Hey Arnold!	5	Nickelodeon
March 28	Rocket Power	2	Nickelodeon
April 5	South Park	4	Comedy Central
July 28	The Powerpuff Girls	3	Cartoon Network
August 11	Johnny Bravo	3	Cartoon Network
September 2	The Angry Beavers	4	YTV (Note: Made its premiere on Nickelodeon on January 6, 2001.)
October 1	King of the Hill	5	Fox
October 20	SpongeBob SquarePants	2	Nickelodeon
October 31	Courage the Cowardly Dog	2	Cartoon Network
November 1	The Simpsons	12	Fox

== Television season finales ==
Date	Title	Season	Channel
January 12	South Park	3	Comedy Central
January 28	Johnny Bravo	2	Cartoon Network
March 11	Hey Arnold!	4	Nickelodeon
March 16	CatDog	2	Nickelodeon
March 18	The Angry Beavers	3	Nickelodeon
March 21	Rocket Power	1	Nickelodeon
April 21	Mike, Lu & Og	1	Cartoon Network
May 21	King of the Hill	4	Fox
May 21	The Simpsons	11	Fox
June 21	Hey Arnold!	4	Nickelodeon
June 30	The Powerpuff Girls	2	Cartoon Network
July 14	Courage the Cowardly Dog	1	Cartoon Network
August 1	Family Guy	2	Fox
December 3	Futurama	2	Fox
December 20	South Park	4	Comedy Central
December 22	Ed, Edd n Eddy	2	Cartoon Network

== Births ==
=== January ===
- January 7: Marcus Scribner, American actor (voice of Buck in The Good Dinosaur, Smudge in Home: Adventures with Tip & Oh, Bow in She-Ra and the Princesses of Power, Alex in Ron's Gone Wrong, D'Angelo Baker in Dragons: The Nine Realms, Movie Goer in the American Dad! episode "Garfield and Friends").
- January 8: Noah Cyrus, American singer, songwriter, and actress (voice of the title character in Ponyo, Kid in The Emperor's New School episode "Guaka Rules").

=== February ===
- February 5: Jordan Nagai, American former child actor (voice of Russell in Up, Charlie in The Simpsons episode "O Brother, Where Bart Thou?").
- February 10: Yara Shahidi, American actress (voice of Darci Scott in the Tales of Arcadia franchise, Brenda in Smallfoot, Melanie in Fearless, Kendra Wilson in PAW Patrol: The Movie, Callie in My Father's Dragon, Little Girl in the Family Guy episode "It's a Trap!").

=== March ===
- March 6: Jacob Bertrand, American actor (voice of Monty in Rise of the Guardians, Bam in Batwheels, young Noatak in The Legend of Korra episode "Skeletons in the Closet", Chama in The Lion Guard episode "Rafiki's New Neighbors").
- March 21: Jace Norman, American actor (voice of Kid Danger in The Adventures of Kid Danger, Steak Stankco in The Loud House episode "Legends").

=== May ===
- May 18: Addison Holley, Canadian actress (voice of Owlette in PJ Masks, Lili in My Big Big Friend, Miss Elaina in Daniel Tiger's Neighborhood, the title character in Ella the Elephant, Kate Persky in Grojband, Katie in Wild Kratts, Julia and The Cheetah in PAW Patrol, Tessa in Peg + Cat, Bianca in Wishenpoof!, Hazel in Little Charmers, Jessica Beeker in The ZhuZhus, Alice in the Doodlebops Rockin' Road Show episode "The Trumpet That Roared", Layla in the Caillou episode "The New Girl", Sally in the Monster Math Squad episode "Special Delivery").

=== June ===
- June 2: Lilimar Hernandez, American actress (voice of Solana in Spirit Riding Free, Cleopatra in Cleopatra in Space, Jeff in Batwheels, Valentina "Val" Ortiz in Inside Out 2).

=== July ===
- July 16: Jonathan Morgan Heit, American former actor (voice of Weston the Elf in Holly and Hal Moose: Christmas Adventure, Cubby in seasons 1-3 of Jake and the Never Land Pirates, Kip Supernova in Escape from Planet Earth).
- July 25: Meg Donnelly, American actress (voice of Supergirl in the Tomorrowverse, Scream in the Spider-Man episode "Maximum Venom", Addison Wells in Zombies: The Re-Animated Series).

=== August ===
- August 3:
  - Chandler Kinney, American actress and singer (voice of Willa in Zombies: The Re-Animated Series, Tammy Myers in The Ghost and Molly McGee episode "The (Un)natural", Buttercup in the Robot Chicken episode "May Cause a Squeakquel").
  - Landry Bender, American actress (voice of Makini in The Lion Guard, Little Sister in the Jake and the Never Land Pirates episode "The Singing Stones").
- August 20: Fátima Ptacek, American actress (continued voice of Dora in the Dora the Explorer franchise).

=== September ===
- September 1: Jacob Ewaniuk, Canadian actor (voice of Nick in seasons 1 and 2 of The Cat in the Hat Knows a Lot About That!, Catboy in season 1 of PJ Masks, continued voice of Timmy Tibble in Arthur).
- September 4: Ruby Stokes, English actress (voice of Kitty in Where Is Anne Frank).
- September 28: Frankie Jonas, American former child actor (voice of Sōsuke in Ponyo, Junior in The Reef 2: High Tide).

=== October ===
- October 14: Mekai Curtis, American actor (voice of Zack Underwood in Milo Murphy's Law, Fuhara in The Lion Guard episode "Rafiki's New Neighbors").
- October 16: David Rawle, Irish actor (voice of Ben in Song of the Sea).
- October 31: Willow Smith, American singer-songwriter and actress (voice of Unica in We Baby Bears, Abby in Merry Madagascar, young Gloria in Madagascar: Escape 2 Africa, Beth in the Adventure Time episode "Come Along with Me").

=== November ===
- November 10: Mackenzie Foy, American actress (voice of Celestine in Ernest & Celestine, Violet in The Boxcar Children).
- November 15: Coco Grayson, American actress (voice of Princess Hildegard in Sofia the First, Maynar in Lego Star Wars: The Freemaker Adventures).
- November 22: Auliʻi Cravalho, American actress and singer (voice of Moana in the Moana franchise, Ralph Breaks the Internet, Lego Disney Princess: The Castle Quest, Lego Disney Princess: Villains Unite, and Once Upon a Studio, Hailey Banks in Hailey's On It!, Veronica in the Elena of Avalor episode "The Last Laugh", Muse in the Krapopolis episode "Muse Your Illusion").

=== December ===
- December 22: Joshua Bassett, American actor, singer and songwriter (voice of Nick Daley in Night at the Museum: Kahmunrah Rises Again).

== Deaths ==
=== January ===
- January 7: Bob McFadden, American actor (voice of Franken Berry in the Monster Cereals, the title character in Cool McCool, Jingle Bells in The Year Without a Santa Claus, Snarf in ThunderCats), dies at age 76.
- January 12: Marc Davis, American animator and character designer (Walt Disney Animation Studios), dies at age 86.

=== February ===
- February 10: Jim Varney, American actor and comedian (voice of Slinky Dog in Toy Story and Toy Story 2, Cookie in Atlantis: The Lost Empire, Mr. Gus Holder in Annabelle's Wish, Walt Evergreen in the Duckman episode "You've Come a Wrong Way, Baby", Cooder in The Simpsons episode "Bart Carny", Ephialtes in the Hercules episode "Hercules and the Muse of Dance"), dies at age 50.
- February 12: Charles M. Schulz, American cartoonist (creator of Peanuts), dies at age 77.
- February 13: J. Robert Harris, American composer (theme from Spider-Man), dies at age 74.
- February 23: Ofra Haza, Israeli singer, actress, recording artist, writer and journalist (voice of Yocheved and performed the song "Deliver Us" in The Prince of Egypt), dies at age 42.

=== March ===
- March 3: Nicole Van Goethem, Belgian cartoonist, animator and film director (A Greek Tragedy), dies at the age of 58.
- March 6: John Colicos, Canadian actor (voice of Apocalypse in X-Men: The Animated Series), dies at age 71.
- March 13: Rex Everhart, American actor (voice of Maurice in Beauty and the Beast), dies at age 79.
- March 16: Stanley Ralph Ross, American writer (Wait Till Your Father Gets Home, G.I. Joe: A Real American Hero), and actor (voice of Gorilla Grodd and Brainiac in Super Friends), dies at age 64.
- March 24: Kazuo Komatsubara, Japanese animator, character designer and director (Toei Animation, Oh! Production), dies at age 59.

=== April ===
- April 3: Félix Nakamura, Peruvian animator and film director, dies from cancer at age 59.

=== May ===
- May 9: Arthur Davis, American animator and film director (Charles B. Mintz, Warner Bros. Cartoons, Walter Lantz, Hanna-Barbera, DePatie-Freleng Enterprises), dies at age 94.

=== June ===
- June 1: Tito Puente, American musician, songwriter, bandleader and record producer (voiced himself in The Simpsons episode "Who Shot Mr. Burns?"), dies from a heart attack at age 77.
- June 13: Yefim Gamburg, Russian film director (Passion of Spies, Ograblenie po..., Blue Puppy, Dog in Boots), dies at age 75.
- June 24: David Tomlinson, English actor, singer and comedian (portrayed George Banks in Mary Poppins, Professor Emelius Brown in Bedknobs and Broomsticks, Sir John and voice of Polar Bear in The Water Babies), dies at age 83.
- June 30: Robert L. Manahan, American actor (second voice of Zordon in Power Rangers) and re-recording mixer (McGee and Me!, Beakman's World, Mighty Morphin Power Rangers, King of the Hill, Dilbert), dies at age 43.

=== July ===
- July 14: Meredith MacRae, American actress (voice of Francine Langstrom in Batman: The Animated Series, Rachel Quest in Jonny's Golden Quest), dies at age 56.
- July 20: Eyvind Earle, American artist, author and illustrator (Walt Disney Animation Studios), dies at age 84.

=== August ===
- August 8: Glenn Schmitz, American animator and comics artist (Walt Disney Animation, Hanna-Barbera, Ruby-Spears), dies at age 70.
- August 24: Tatiana Riabouchinska, Russian ballerina (Fantasia, Make Mine Music), dies at age 83.
- August 25: Carl Barks, American animator and comics artist (Walt Disney Company), dies at age 99.
- August 27: Ante Zaninovic, Croatian animator, film director and comics artist (Professor Balthazar), dies at age 65.

=== September ===
- September 3: Walt Stanchfield, American animator, writer and teacher (Walt Disney Studios), dies at age 81.
- September 10:
  - Ben Wicks, English-born Canadian cartoonist, illustrator, journalist and author (co-creator of Katie and Orbie), dies from cancer at age 73.
  - Lester Novros, American animator, art director, and teacher of filmmaking (Snow White and the Seven Dwarfs, Fantasia), dies at age 91.
- September 13: Rolf Kauka, German comics artist and film director (Fix and Foxi), dies at age 83.
- September 26: Richard Mulligan, American actor (voice of Einstein in Oliver & Company, Old Gramps in The Angry Beavers episode "Fish and Dips", Jimmy Kafka in the Hey Arnold! episode "Old Iron Man"), dies from colon cancer at age 67.

=== October ===
- October 16: Ed Nofziger, American animator and comics artist (UPA), dies at age 87.
- October 30: Steve Allen, American television personality, radio personality, musician, composer, actor, comedian and writer (voice of Bart Simpson's Electronically Altered Voice in The Simpsons episode "Separate Vocations", himself in The Critic episode "A Day at the Races and a Night at the Opera", The Simpsons episode "'Round Springfield", and the Pinky and the Brain episode "The Pinky and the Brain Reunion Special"), dies from hemopericardium at age 78.

=== November ===
- November 1: Bernard Erhard, American actor (voice of Cy-Kill in Challenge of the GoBots, Timber Smurf in The Smurfs, Cryotek in Visionaries: Knights of the Magical Light, King Morpheus in Little Nemo: Adventures in Slumberland, Wolf in Rover Dangerfield), dies at age 66.
- November 16: Joe C., American rapper and musician (voice of Kidney Rock in Osmosis Jones, and himself in The Simpsons episode "Kill the Alligator and Run"), dies from celiac disease at age 26.
- November 20: Vyacheslav Kotyonochkin, Russian animator and comics artist (Nu, pogodi!, aka Well, Just You Wait!), dies at age 73.
- November 28: Robert Bentley, American animator (Warner Bros. Cartoons, Fleischer Studios, MGM, Walter Lantz Productions, UPA, Hanna-Barbera, Filmation), dies at age 93.

=== December ===
- December 3: Hoyt Curtin, American composer (Hanna-Barbera), dies at age 78.
- December 6: Werner Klemperer, German-American actor, stage entertainer and singer (voice of Haman in The Greatest Adventure: Stories from the Bible episode "Queen Esther", Colonel Klink in The Simpsons episode "The Last Temptation of Homer"), dies from cancer at age 80.
- December 18: Nick Stewart, American actor (voice of Specks Crow in Dumbo and Br'er Bear in Song of the South), dies at age 90.
- December 23: Billy Barty, American actor (voice of Figment in Language Arts Through Imagination, Dweedle in Wildfire, Baitmouse in The Rescuers Down Under, Hips McManus in The New Batman Adventures episode "Double Talk"), dies at age 76.

=== Specific date unknown ===
- Storm de Hirsch, American poet, film director and animator (Peyote Queen), dies at age 87 or 88.
- Meliza Espinosa, Canadian character designer (DIC Entertainment, Werner, Jungle Cubs, Timon & Pumbaa), dies at an unknown age.

== See also ==
- 2000 in anime
