= Experiment (disambiguation) =

An experiment is a set of observations performed in the context of solving a particular problem or question.

Experiment may also refer to:

- Experiment (probability theory), a repeatable process with a fixed set of possible outcomes
- Experiment, Georgia, a census-designated place in the United States
- Experiment (1943 film), a Czech film
- Experiment (1988 film), a short Soviet film
- Experiment (game), a dedicated deck card game
- Experiment (Lilo & Stitch), any one of a series of fictional genetically engineered characters from the Lilo & Stitch franchise
- Experiment (locomotive), an 1833 steam locomotive
- Experiment, an 1835 railway coach used at the Stockton and Darlington Railway's opening
- Experiment (ship), any one of a number of vessels, naval and mercantile
- Experiment (website), a crowdfunding website
- Experiment (album), a 2018 album by Kane Brown

== See also ==
- Experimentalism
- Experiment Farm
- The Experiment (disambiguation)
