= Experiment (ship) =

Many vessels have borne the name Experiment:

Naval vessels

- HMS Experiment, thirteen ships of the Royal Navy
- USS Experiment, two ships of the United States Navy

Merchant vessels

- Experiment (horse-powered boat), c.1810 (unsuccessful) application of screw propulsion
- Experiment (1789 ship) was launched on the River Thames and made three voyages for Calvert & Co. as a slave ship, carrying slaves from the Gold Coast to Jamaica before a French squadron captured her in 1795.
- Experiment (1792 ship) was launched at Leith. The British Royal Navy purchased her in 1797, used her as a gun-brig escorting convoys, and then sold her in 1802. New owners sailed her as a West Indiaman; she was last listed in 1816.
- Experiment (1798 ship), launched in 1798, transported convicts to New South Wales in 1803
- Experiment (1800 ship), was launched at Calcutta and was lost in 1807
- Experiment (1802 ship) transported convicts to New South Wales in 1809–10
- Experiment (1802 EIC ship) made three voyages for the British East India Company and was lost in 1808 on her fourth
- Experiment (1832 ship), one of Sydney's first ferries, a paddler originally powered by four horses on a treadmill

== See also ==
- Experiment (disambiguation)
