= 2000 in anime =

The events of 2000 in anime.

== Events ==
In this year, 124 anime television programs were produced.

== Accolades ==
At the Mainichi Film Awards, Doraemon: A Grandmother's Recollections won the Animation Film Award and Blood: The Last Vampire won the Ōfuji Noburō Award. The Old Man and the Sea won the Grand prix du court métrage at the Annecy International Animated Film Festival.

== Releases ==
=== Films ===
A list of anime that debuted in theaters between January 1 and December 31, 2000.

Release date	Title	Studio	Director(s)	Running time (minutes)
February 5	A.LI.CE	GAGA Communications, Inc.	Kenichi Maejima	85
March 4	One Piece: The Movie	Toei Animation	Junji Shimizu	50
March 4	Doraemon: A Grandmother's Recollections	Toho Company	Ayumu Watanabe	27
March 4	Digimon Adventure: Our War Game	Toei Animation	Mamoru Hosoda	41
March 11	Doraemon: Nobita and the Legend of the Sun King	Shin-Ei Animation	Tsutomu Shibayama	91
March 22	Detective Conan: Captured in Her Eyes	TMS Entertainment	Kenji Kodama	100
April 22	Crayon Shin-chan: Jungle That Invites Storm	Shin-Ei Animation	Keiichi Hara	88
June 3	Jin-Roh: The Wolf Brigade	Production I.G	Hiroyuki Okiura	102
June 24	Escaflowne	Sunrise Bones	Kazuki Akane	97
July 8	Pokemon Movie 03: Kesshoutou no Teiou Entei	OLM	Kunihiko Yuyama	73
July 15	Cardcaptor Sakura Movie 2: The Sealed Card	Madhouse	Morio Asaka	82
July 22	The Boy Who Saw the Wind	Brain's Base	Kazuki Ōmori	97
August 25	Vampire Hunter D: Bloodlust	Madhouse	Yoshiaki Kawajiri	102
October 7	Reign: The Conqueror	Madhouse	Rintaro Yoshinori Kanemori	101
October 21	Ah! My Goddess: The Movie	AIC	Hiroaki Gouda	106
November 18	Blood: The Last Vampire	Production I.G	Hiroyuki Kitakubo	48
December 21	Rokumon Tengai Mon Colle Knights Movie: Densetsu no Fire Dragon	Studio Deen	Yasunao Aoki	32

=== Television series ===
A list of anime television series that debuted between January 1 and December 31, 2000.

First run start and end dates	Title	Episodes	Studio	Director(s)	Original title
January 3 – December 28, 2001	Popee the Performer	39	Zuiyo	Ryuuji Masuda	POPEE the ぱフォーマー POPEE the pafōmā
January 5 –March 22	Boogiepop Phantom	12	Madhouse	Takashi Watanabe	ブギーポップは笑わない Boogiepop Phantom: Bugīpoppu wa Warawanai Boogiepop Phantom
January 10 – December 25	Mon Colle Knights	51	Studio Deen	Yasunao Aoki	六門天外モンコレナイト Rokumon Tengai Mon Kore Naito
January 20 – March 27	Candidate for Goddess	12	Xebec	Mitsuru Hongo	女神候補生 Megami Kōhosei
January 26 – April 19	Carried by the Wind: Tsukikage Ran	13	Madhouse	Akitaro Daichi	風まかせ月影蘭 Kazemakase Tsukikage Ran
January 27 – April 13	The Super Milk-chan Show	12	Pierrot	Takahiro Oomori	OH!スーパーミルクチャン OH! Sūpā Miruku-chan
February 5 – September 23	Mushrambo	32	Toei Animation	Tetsuo Imazawa	マシュランボー Mashuranbō
February 5 – May 20	Miami Guns	13	Group TAC	Yoshitaka Koyama	マイアミ☆ガンズ Maiami Ganzu
February 6 – September 30, 2001	Mighty Cat Masked Niyander	83	Sunrise	Tomomi Mochizuki	ニャニがニャンだー ニャンダーかめん Nyani ga Nyandaa Nyandaa Kamen
February 6 – January 28, 2001	Ojamajo Doremi Sharp	49	Toei Animation	Takuya Igarashi Shigeyasu Yamauchi	おジャ魔女どれみ#Ojamajo doremi #
March 28 – February 26, 2002	UFO Baby	78	J.C.Staff	Hiroaki Sakurai	だぁ!だぁ!だぁ! Daa! Daa! Daa!
April 1 – September 30	Monster Rancher	25	TMS Entertainment	Hiroyuki Yano	モンスターファーム～伝説[レジェンド]への道～ Monsutā fāmu ~ densetsu [rejendo] e no michi ~
April 2 – March 25, 2001	Digimon Adventure 02	50	Toei Animation	Hiroyuki Kakudou	デジモンアドベンチャー 02 Dejimon Adobenchā Zero Tsū
April 3 – January 2, 2001	Hero Hero-kun	104	Studio Bogey Studio Flag	Yoshihiro Takamoto	へろへろくん
April 3 – September 18	Gate Keepers	24	Gonzo	Junichi Sato	ゲートキーパーズ Gēto Kīpāzu
April 4 – September 19	Platinumhugen Ordian	24	Plum	Masami Oobari	銀装騎攻オーディアン Ginsou Kikou Oodian
April 4 – December 26	Doki Doki Densetsu Mahōjin Guru Guru	38	Nippon Animation	Jun Takagi	魔法陣グルグル
April 4 – March 27, 2001	Saiyūki	50	Pierrot	Hayato Date	最遊記 Saiyūki
April 5 – October 4	Time Bokan 2000: Kaitou Kiramekiman	26	Tatsunoko Production	Hiroshi Sasagawa	タイムボカン2000 怪盗きらめきマン Taimu bokan 2000 kaitō kiramekiman
April 5 – December 27	Transformers: Robots in Disguise	39	Gallop Dongwoo A&E	Osamu Sekita	トランスフォーマー カーロボット Transformers: Car Robots
April 5 – September 20	Hidamari no Ki	25	Madhouse	Gisaburou Sugii	陽だまりの樹 Hidamari no ki
April 8 – September 23	Sakura Wars	25	Madhouse	Ryutaro Nakamura	サクラ大戦 Sakura Taisen
April 11 – July 4	Boys Be...	13	HAL Film Maker	Masami Shimoda	ボーイズ・ビー Bōizu bī
April 11 – October 17	Inspector Fabre	26	E&G Films	Masami Furukawa	ファーブル先生は名探偵 Fabre Sensei wa Meitantei
April 14 – July 14	Banner of the Stars	13	Sunrise	Yasuchika Nagaoka	星界の戦旗 Seikai no Senki
April 17 – March 26, 2001	Taro the Space Alien	24			うちゅう人田中太郎 Uchūjin Tanaka Tarō
April 18 – September 29, 2004	Yu-Gi-Oh! Duel Monsters	224	Gallop	Kunihisa Sugishima	遊☆戯☆王デュエルモンスターズ Yūgiō Dyueru Monsutāzu
April 19 – September 27	Love Hina	24	Xebec	Yoshiaki Iwasaki	ラブ ひな Rabu hina
April 20 – September 28	Ceres, Celestial Legend	24	Pierrot	Hajime Kamegaki	妖しのセレス Ayashi no Seresu
April 26 – July 19	NieA_7	13	Triangle Staff	Takuya Sato Tomokazu Tokoro	ニアアンダーセブン NieA Under 7
July 7 – March 30, 2001	Medabots Spirits	39	Trans Arts	Masatsugu Arakawa	メダロット魂 Medarot Damashii
July 7 – March 31, 2006	Hamtaro	296	TMS Entertainment	Osamu Nabeshima	とっとこハム太郎 Tottoko hamutarō
July 11 – September 26	Strange Dawn	13	HAL Film Maker	Shogo Koumoto Junichi Sato (Co-director)	ストレンジ・ドーン Sutorenji dōn
July 21 – February 9, 2001	Brigadoon: Marin & Melan	26	Sunrise	Yoshitomo Yonetani	ブリガドーン まりんとメラン Burigadōn marin to meran
July 26 – September 27	Hand Maid May	10	TNK	Shinichiro Kimura	HAND MAID メイ HAND mēdo mei
July 28 – November 30	Dinozaurs: The Series	26	Sunrise	Kiyoshi Fukumoto	ダイノゾーン Dainozōn
October 2 – December 18	Descendants of Darkness	13	J.C.Staff		闇の末裔 Yami no matsuei
October 3 – December 19	Vandread	13	Gonzo	Takeshi Mori	ヴァンドレッド Vuandoreddo
October 4 – January 10, 2001	Gravitation	13	Studio Deen	Bob Shirahata	グラビテーション Gurabitēshon
October 4 – June 27, 2001	Gear Fighter Dendoh	38	Sunrise	Mitsuo Fukuda	GEAR戦士電童 Gia senshi dendō
October 4 – March 27, 2002	Hajime no Ippo	75	Madhouse	Satoshi Nishimura	はじめの一歩 THE FIGHTING! Hajime no ippo THE FIGHTING!
October 6 – March 22, 2001	Argento Soma	25	Sunrise	Kazuyoshi Katayama	アルジェント ソーマ Arujento sōma
October 6 – March 23, 2001	Sci-fi Harry	20	APPP	Katsuyuki Kodera	サイファイハリー
October 7 – March 24, 2001	Legendary Gambler Tetsuya	20	Toei Animation	Nobutaka Nishizawa	勝負師伝説哲也 Shoubushi Densetsu Tetsuya
October 7 – September 29, 2001	Shin Megami Tensei: Devil Children	50	Tokyo Movie	Yoshio Takeuchi	真・女神転生 デビチル Ma megami tenshō debi chiru
October 8 – June 29, 2001	Baby Felix	65	Radix		ベイビーフィリックス Beibī firikkusu
October 14 – March 17, 2001	Invincible King Tri-Zenon	22	E&G Films	Takashi Watanabe	無敵王トライゼノン Muteki Ou Tri-zenon
October 16 – September 13, 2004	Inuyasha	167	Sunrise	Masashi Ikeda Yasunao Aoki	戦国御伽草子 犬夜叉 Sengoku Otogizōshi Inuyasha
October 16 – January 8, 2001	Android Kikaider: The Animation	13	Radix Studio OX	Tensai Okamura	人造人間キカイダーTHE ANIMATION Jinzou Ningen Kikaider: The Animation
October 22 – March 25, 2001	Ghost Stories	19	Pierrot	Noriyuki Abe	学校の怪談 Gakkō no Kaidan
October 24 – May 1, 2001	Hiwou War Chronicles	26	Bones	Tetsurou Amino	機巧奇傳ヒヲウ戦記 Karakuri Kiden Hiō Senki
November 26 – May 29, 2001	Dotto! Koni-chan	26	Shaft	Shinichi Watanabe	ドッと!KONIちゃん Dotto! Konī-chan

=== Original net animations ===
A list of original net animations that debuted between January 1 and December 31, 2000.

Release date	English name	Episodes	Studio	Director(s)	Original title	Type
January 26	Anon Sentai Ranger 5	1	Anon Pictures		アノン戦隊レンジャー5 Anon sentai renjā 5	
December 28	Azumanga Web Daioh	1	Ajia-do	Hiroshi Nishikiori	あずまんがWEB大王 Azumanga WEB daiō	ONA

=== Original video animations ===
A list of original video animations that debuted between January 1 and December 31, 2000.

First run start and end dates	Title	Episodes	Studio	Director(s)	Original title
January 21 – March 21, 2003	The King of Braves GaoGaiGar Final	8	Sunrise	Yoshitomo Yonetani Yuuji Yamaguchi	勇者王ガオガイガーFINAL Yūsha-ō gaogaigā FINAL
February	The Prince and the Coral Sea	1	Toei Animation		サンゴの海と王子 Sango no Umi to Ouji
February 14	First Kiss Story	1	Garyuu Studio	Kan Fukumoto	ファーストKiss☆物語 Fāsuto Kiss ☆ monogatari
March 20 – November 22	Go! Anpanman: Playing with the robot is fun!	2			それいけ! アンパンマン おうたとてあそび たのしいね Sore ike! Anpanman outa to teasobi tanoshī ne
March 22	Black Jack: Sora Kara Kita Kodomo	1	Tezuka Productions	Shinji Seya	ブラック・ジャック 空からきた子ども Black Jack: Sora kara Kita Kodomo
March 24	Karakuri no Kimi	1	TMS Entertainment	Hirotoshi Takaya	からくりの君 Karakuri no kimi
March 25 – June 27	Angelique: White Wing Memoirs	2	Yumeta Company		アンジェリーク ～白い翼のメモワール～ Angelique: Shiroi Tsubasa no Memoire
April 26 – March 16, 2001	FLCL	6	Gainax Production I.G	Kazuya Tsurumaki	フリクリ Furikuri
May 24	Amon: The Apocalypse of Devilman	1	Studio Live	Kenichi Takeshita	AMON デビルマン黙示録 Ēmon debiruman mokushiroku
May 25 – August 25	Angel Sanctuary	3	HAL Film Maker	Kiyoko Sayama	天使禁猟区 Tenshi Kinryouku
May 25 – January 25, 2002	JoJo no Kimyou na Bouken: Adventure	7	APPP	Yasuhito Kikuchi Hideki Futamura Noboru Furuse	ジョジョの奇妙な冒険 ADVENTURE Jojo no kimyō nabōken adobenchā
June 23 – November 30, 2001	Denshin Mamotte Shugogetten	8	Toei Animation	Yukio Kaizawa	伝心 まもって守護月天！Den kokoro mamotte shugogetten
June 23	Space Travelers The Animation	1	Robot Films	Takashi Ui	スペーストラベラーズ The Animation Supesu toraberaz The Animation
July 19 – October 4	Koutetsu Tenshi Kurumi Encore	4	OLM	Naohito Takahashi	鋼鉄天使くるみ 25-28話
July 25 – September 25, 2001	eX-Driver	6	Actas	Jun Kawagoe	エクスドライバー Ekusu doraibā
July 26 – March 23, 2001	Geobreeders 2: Mouryou Yuugekitai File-XX Ransen Toppa	4	Chaos Project	Shin Misawa	ジオブリーダーズ2 魍魎遊撃隊
September 21	Kirara	1	Ashi Productions	Kiyoshi Murayama	KIRARA
September 25 – December 21	Labyrinth of Flames	2	Studio Fantasia	Katsuhiko Nishijima	炎のらびりんす Honō no rabirinsu
October 24	Sin: The Movie	1	Phoenix Entertainment	Yasunori Urata Koubun Shizuno (Co-director)	sin THE MOVIE
November 25 – January 25, 2001	De:vadasy	3	AIC	Nobuhiro Kondou	創世聖紀デヴァダシー Sōsei seiki devuadashī
December 13 – March 7, 2001	Maetel Legend	2	Vega Entertainment	Kazuyoshi Yokota	メーテルレジェンド Mēteru rejendo
December 21 – June 25, 2001	Shin Getter Robo vs. Neo Getter Robo	4	Brain's Base	Jun Kawagoe	真ゲッターロボ対ネオゲッターロボ Shin Getter Robo tai Neo Getter Robo
	Try Z	1			
	Koihime	2			
	A Heat for All Seasons	3			

== See also ==
- 2000 in animation
