= HMS Experiment =

Thirteen ships of the Royal Navy have borne the name HMS Experiment:

- HMS Experiment (1664) was a double-hulled sloop built in 1664 and lost in 1687.
- HMS Experiment (1667) was a 4-gun sloop built in 1667 and on the Navy List until 1682.
- HMS Experiment (1689) was a 32-gun fifth-rate frigate built in 1689, rebuilt in 1727 and broken up in 1738. Her logbook survives.
- HMS Experiment (1740) was a 24-gun sixth rate, launched in 1740 and sold in 1763. She captured the French privateer Telemaque in 1757 and had a young John Jervis serving on board her.
- HMS Experiment (1765) was a storeship, purchased in 1765 and sold in 1768.
- HMS Experiment (1772) was a gunboat, built in 1772. Her fate is unknown. Possibly lost in the Great Hurricane of 1780
- HMS Experiment (1774) was a 50-gun fourth rate launched in 1774. The French 50-gun ship Sagittaire captured her off the North American coast in September 1779, during the American Revolutionary War, along with three merchantmen.
- HMS Experiment (1781) was a 14-gun brig sloop purchased in 1781 and sold in 1785.
- HMS Experiment (1784) was a 44-gun fifth rate launched in 1784, used as a storeship from 1795 and for harbour service from 1805. She was sold in 1836. Because Experiment served in the navy's Egyptian campaign between 8 March 1801 and 2 September, her officers and crew qualified for the clasp "Egypt" to the Naval General Service Medal, which the Admiralty issued in 1847 to all surviving claimants.
- HMS Experiment (1793) was a 10-gun lugger launched in 1793 that the Spanish captured in the Mediterranean in 1796. The British privateer Felicity recaptured her in early 1806 but the Royal Navy did not take her back into service.
- HMS Experiment (1794) was a fire ship purchased in 1794 and sold in 1801.
- HMS Experiment (1799) was a 2-gun gunboat launched in 1799, gone from the Navy List by 1809.
- HMS Experiment (1838) was a wood paddle sloop serving on the Canadian Lakes. She was purchased in 1838 and sold in 1848.

== See also ==
- Experiment (ship)
