= C. W. Nicol =

Welsh-Japanese writer (1940–2020)

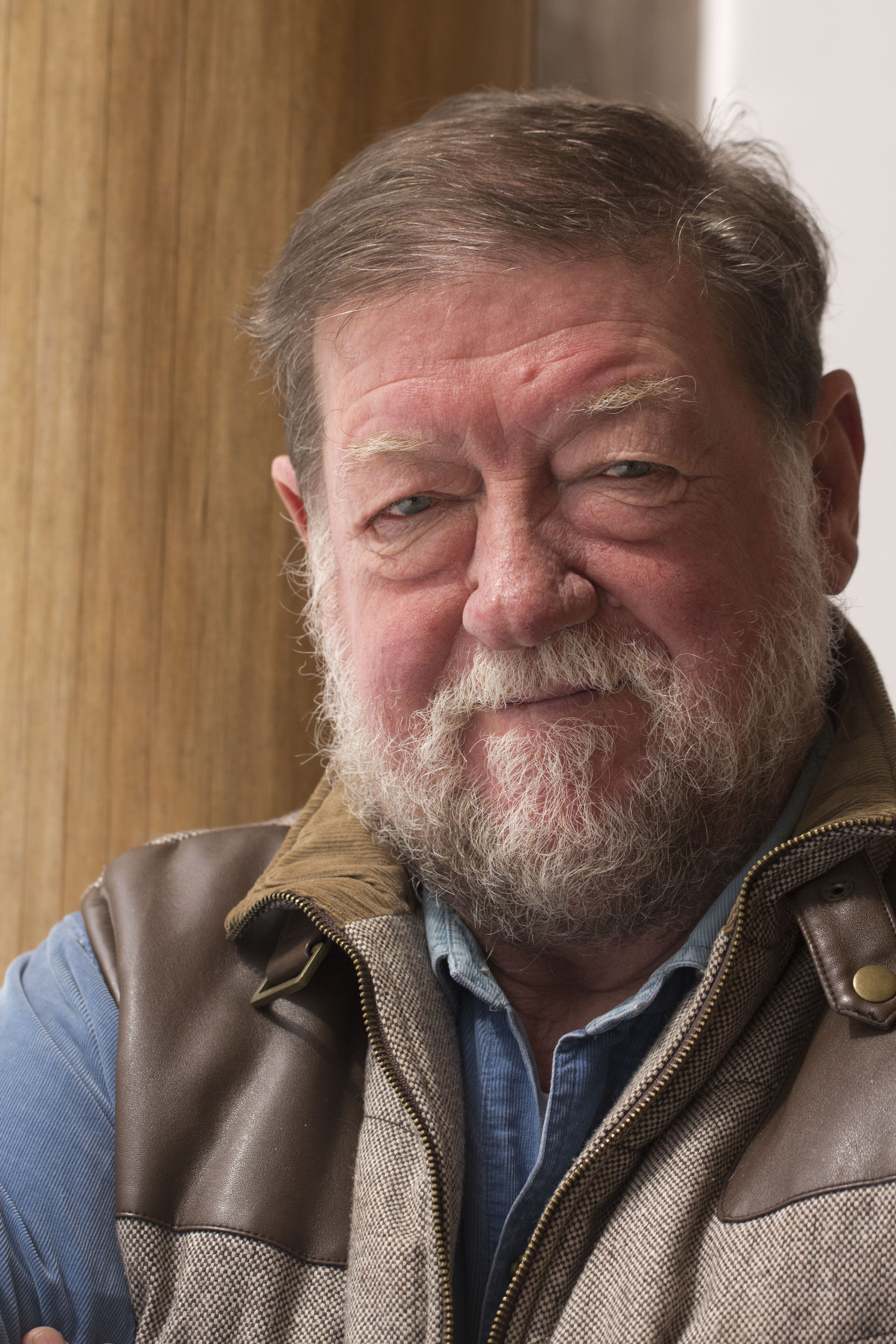
- Born: Clive William Nicol; 17 July 1940; Neath, Wales
- Died: 3 April 2020 (aged 79); Japan
- Citizenship: Japan
- Education: Tokyo University of Science
- Occupations: Writer, illustrator

Clive William Nicol, MBE (Japanese: C・W・ニコル; 17 July 1940 – 3 April 2020) was a Welsh-Japanese writer. He was a long-time resident and citizen of Japan.

== Early life ==
Nicol was born in Neath, Wales. He graduated from Tokyo University of Science.

== Career ==
In 1958, Nicol visited the Arctic Circle to research eider ducks. He became a Canadian citizen. By the early 1960s, he was studying Shotokan karate-Do at the headquarters of the Japan Karate Association (JKA) and studied Japanese and fisheries at Nihon University. He spent 1967 to 1969 as a game warden in Ethiopia, setting up the new Semien Mountains National Park. He returned to Japan, writing a book about his Ethiopian experiences entitled From the Roof of Africa (1971).

After he took up residence in Japan, Nicol focused on writing books and other literary works. In 1980, he won the Japan Broadcasting Writer's Award for a television drama written in Japanese. He continued to be an active environmentalist and lecture about the environment, addressing issues such as deforestation and the preservation of natural environments. He was particularly interested in restoring Japan's vast woodlands. The C. W. Nicol Afan Woodland in Kurohime, Shinanomachi, Nagano Prefecture, was established in 1986.

Nicol became a Japanese citizen (and thus lost his Canadian and British citizenship), which he wrote about in Why I Became Japanese (僕が日本人になった理由, Boku ga Nihonjin ni natta riyū).

He wrote both fiction and non-fiction books, in both Japanese and in English. His subjects included whaling (for which he went on a trip on a whaling vessel), the environment, martial arts and children's fiction. His books have been translated between English and Japanese, as well as into French, Italian, German, Mongolian, Korean and Chinese. In 2005, he was awarded an Order of the British Empire.

Nicol was the chairman of the Afan Woodland Trust. He was diagnosed with cancer in 2016, and died in 2020 at age 79.

== Selected works ==
- The White Shaman
- Harpoon / Isana
- The Boy Who Saw the Wind
- The Raven's Tale
- From the Roof of Africa
- Moving Zen: Karate as a Way to Gentleness
- The White Hippo
- Ayukawa, A Whalers' Town

== Discography ==
- Sail Down the River (1991)
- The World of Little Twins (1992)

== See also ==
- Hideo Levy
- David Zoppetti
