= USS Experiment =

USS Experiment may refer to several ships, including:

- USS Experiment (1799) was a schooner launched in 1799 and sold in 1801
- USS Experiment (1832) was a schooner launched in 1832 and sold in 1848

== See also ==
- Experiment (ship)
