= The Experiment (disambiguation) =

The Experiment was a documentary series broadcast on BBC television in 2002.

The Experiment may also refer to:

== Literature ==
- "The Experiment", a 1931 short story by M. R. James
- The Experiment (Animorphs), the 1999 and twenty-eighth book in the Animorphs series
- Jason X: The Experiment, a 2005 novel by Pat Cadigan

== Media ==
- The Experiment (1922 film), a 1922 British silent film
- "The Experiment" (CBS Playhouse), a 1969 broadcast as part of the CBS Playhouse series
- "The Experiment" (Degrassi Junior High), a 1987 Canadian television episode
- Das Experiment, a 2001 German film

- The Experiment (2010 film), a 2010 American film and remake of the 2001 German film

- Teen Big Brother: The Experiment, a 2003 UK spin off of the popular television program Big Brother
- The Experiment (video game), the 2007 adventure video game
- The Experiment (upcoming film), a 2026 upcoming film
- The Experiment, a 2026 Channel 4 satirical disabilities documentary with Sophie Morgan and Mat Fraser

== Music ==
- The Experiment (Dane Rumble album)
- The Experiment (Art vs. Science album)

== People ==
- The Experiment (wrestler) (born 1967), Greco-Roman wrestler

== See also ==
- Experiment (disambiguation)
