= O, more, more! =

- Directed by: Yefim Gamburg
- Written by: Aleksandr Kurlyandskiy, Mikhail Lipskerov
- Starring: A. Timoshkin, Anyuta Rybnikova
- Cinematography: Pyotr Rakitin
- Music by: P. Ovsyannikov
- Production companies: Soyuzmultfilm, Kievnauchfilm
- Release date: 1983
- Running time: 10 minutes
- Country: Soviet Union
- Language: Russian

O, more, more! (Russian: О, море, море!, lit. The sea, oh the sea) is a 1983 Soviet animated satirical short film produced by Soyuzmultfilm and directed by Yefim Gamburg. It tells the story of young men and women on vacation. They are constantly separated by various circumstances, including the fantastic and phantasmagoric ones, but at the end they finally marry. O, more, more! parodies Soviet popular culture, i.e. popular music (Italian song "Amore amore amore...", i.e., "Amore no" by Adriano Celentano), sugary wedding photos and souvenirs, the maniac hunt for the foreign brands and clothes (such as jeans), and the cult of material prosperity.

== Animators ==
- Natalia Bogomolova (Наталья Богомолова)
- Elvira Maslova (Эльвира Маслова)
- Galina Zebrova (Галина Зеброва)
- Alexander Mazaev (Александр Мазаев)
- Alexander Panov (Александр Панов)
- Joseph Kuroyan (Иосиф Куроян)
