= HMS Manly (1797) =

Brig of the Royal Navy

History

Great Britain
- Name: Experiment
- Owner: J. Scougal
- Builder: Leith
- Launched: 1792
- Fate: Sold 1797

Great Britain
- Name: GB No. 37
- Acquired: April 1797 by purchase
- Renamed: HMS Manly
- Fate: Sold 1802

United Kingdom
- Name: Experiment
- Owner: Dice
- Acquired: 1802 by purchase
- Fate: Last listed 1816

General characteristics
- Tons burthen: 157, or 166 (bm)
- Length: Overall:78 ft 0 in (23.8 m); Keel:65 ft 3 in (19.9 m)
- Beam: 21 ft 3 in (6.5 m)
- Depth of hold: 8 ft 11 1/2 in (2.7 m)
- Propulsion: Sail
- Complement: 50
- Armament: Merchant:2 × 4-pounder guns; Royal Navy:2 × 18-pounder guns + 10 × 18-pounder carronades; Merchant:4 × 4-pounder guns

HMS Manly (or Manley), was originally the merchant ship Experiment, launched in 1792 at Leith. The British Royal Navy purchased her in 1797, used her as a gun-brig escorting convoys, and then sold her in 1802. New owners sailed her between London and Montserrat; she was last listed in 1816.

== Experiment ==
Experiment entered Lloyd's Register in 1792 with J. Scougal, owner, G. Norris, master, and trade Leith–Saint Petersburg. In 1797 Lloyd's Register still carried Experiment with J. Scougal, owner, and trade Leith–Saint Petersburg. Her master was W. Young.

== HMS Manly ==
After the onset of war with France Britain's merchant fleet provided French, and later Dutch and Danish privateers with a target-rich environment. The British Royal Navy needed escort vessels and a quick fix was to buy existing merchant vessels, arm and man them, and then deploy them. Between March and April the Admiralty purchased 10 brigs at Leith, Experiment among them. The Royal Navy initially designated these as GB №__, but then gave them names before they actually sailed.

The Royal Navy acquired Experiment in April 1797 at Leith and commissioned her as GB No.37 in May 1797 under the command of Lieutenant William Malone for the North Sea. She underwent fitting at Leith between May and August, and received her name on 7 August. She spent her brief naval career escorting convoys.

After the Treaty of Amiens ended the war with France, the Admiralty in April 1802 gathered more than 20 of its gun-brigs and other small escort vessels at Sheerness and the Nore, and paid them off. It later sold them.

The "Principal Officers and Commissioners of His Majesty's Navy" offered Manly, of 157 tons, lying at Sheerness, for sale on 12 December 1802. She was sold that month.

== Experiment ==
New owners returned Experiment to her original name. The Register of Shipping carried stale data for a number of years, but then updated it. Experiment became a West Indiaman, trading with Montserrat. She last appeared in the Register in 1816.

Year	Master	Owner	Trade
1802	W. Young	Scougal	Government service
1805	W. Young	Scougal	Government service
1810	J. Dice	J. Dice	London–Montserrat
1816	J. Dice	J. Dice	London–Montserrat
