= Ojamajo Doremi Sharp =

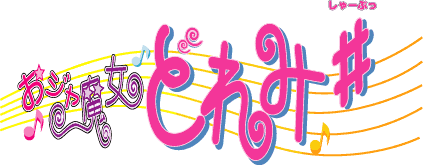
- No. of episodes: 49

Release
- Original network: TV Asahi
- Original release: February 6, 2000 – January 28, 2001

Season chronology
- ← Previous; Ojamajo Doremi Next → Mōtto! Ojamajo Doremi

Ojamajo Doremi Sharp (おジャ魔女どれみ#) (stylized as Ojamajo Doremi #) is the second season in the Ojamajo Doremi series. It was directed by Takuya Igarashi and produced by Toei Animation. The season was broadcast on TV Asahi from February 6, 2000, to January 28, 2001, and lasted 49 episodes. In this season, Doremi and the girls witness the birth of a mysterious baby named Hana in the Witch World, and are given the task to take care of her for one year according to the laws.

Throughout the run of this season, a 30-minute theatrical film directed by Shigeyasu Yamauchi, titled Ojamajo Doremi Sharp Movie (映画おジャ魔女どれみ#つ, Eiga Ojamajo Doremi Shāpu). was released along with Supreme Evolution!! The Golden Digimentals/Digimon Hurricane Touchdown!! for the 2000 Summer Toei Anime Fair. The Digimon movie was split into two parts and Ojamajo Doremi Sharp Movie was screened in between.

The opening theme song for Ojamajo Doremi Sharp was "The Ojamajos are Here" (おジャ魔女はココにいる, Ojamajo wa Koko ni Iru) by Maho-Do. The ending theme song was "Let me Hear Your Voice" (声を聞かせて, Koe o Kikasete), also performed by Maho-Do.

Despite this series never being dubbed in English, Toei Animation's English website uses Magical Doremi instead of Ojamajo Doremi.

== Episode list ==
No. overall	No. in season	Title	Original release date
52	1	"Doremi Becomes a Mom!?"; Transliteration: "Doremi Mama ni Naru!?" (Japanese: どれみママになる!?)	February 6, 2000
When Doremi, Hazuki, Aiko, and Onpu travel to the Witch World to visit Majo Rika, they inadvertently walk into the Queen's garden and encounter a baby born from a special rose. The Ojamajo are given their powers back and tasked to take care of the newborn baby for one year.
53	2	"Raising a Baby is a Lot of Trouble!"; Transliteration: "Akachan Sodate wa mō Taihen!" (Japanese: 赤ちゃん育ては、もうたいへん!)	February 13, 2000
At Maho-do, which has been remodeled to a flower garden, the Ojamajo begin their motherly duties of taking care of Hana. Many people, regardless of whether they are human or not, also assist them.
54	3	"Don't Fall Asleep! Pop's Witch Apprentice Exam"; Transliteration: "Nemuccha Dame! Poppu no Minarai Shiken" (Japanese: 眠っちゃダメ!ぽっぷの見習い試験)	February 20, 2000
With the announcement of a Level 9 Exam for new witch apprentices, Pop decides to take care of Hana for the night to prepare herself.
55	4	"Doremi Fails as a Mom!?"; Transliteration: "Doremi wa Mama Shikkaku!?" (Japanese: どれみはママ失格!?)	February 27, 2000
Although Doremi uses her magic to get two quarreling friends to make up, her deed causes Hana to become ill.
56	5	"So Long, Oyajide"; Transliteration: "Sayonara Oyajīde" (Japanese: さよならオヤジーデ)	March 5, 2000
When the Ojamajo see the iconic ivy of Miss Seki's old high school wilting, they do all they can to fix it in time for the graduation ceremony.
57	6	"Stubbornness and the Daisy in Flower Language"; Transliteration: "Ijippari to Deijī no Hanakotoba" (Japanese: 意地っぱりとデイジーの花ことば)	March 12, 2000
Takao Kimura is shy to admit his crush on Marina Koizumi in front of the SOS Trio, as his stubborn action causes a rift to form between them.
58	7	"Hana's Health Examination"; Transliteration: "Hana-chan no Kenkōshinda" (Japanese: ハナちゃんの健康診断)	March 19, 2000
As with the Ojamajo's previous witch apprentice exams, Hana must undergo monthly health examinations, with the first one coming up very shortly.
59	8	"Through Time, in Search of Onpu's Mother's Secret!"; Transliteration: "Jikan wo Koete, Onpu Mama no Himitsu wo Sagase!" (Japanese: 時間を超えて、おんぷママの秘密を探せ!)	March 26, 2000
Onpu and her friends use the power of Magical Stage to find out why her mother will not allow her to perform at a venue.
60	9	"Search for the Herb! The House of Magic's Bus Trip"; Transliteration: "Hābu wo Sagase! Mahodō Basu no Tabi" (Japanese: ハーブを探せ!MAHO堂バスの旅)	April 2, 2000
Majo Rika and the girls go on a trip to find a certain herb that Hana needs to cure her hiccups and come across Majo Rika's mother, Majo Ririka.
61	10	"High School Student Aiko is "The Running Girl"!?"; Transliteration: "Kōkōsei Aiko wa "Hashiru Shōjo"!?" (Japanese: 高校生あいこは「走る少女」!?)	April 9, 2000
Nobuko has written a new story about Aiko and her friends, while the others take turns inputting their own bit into the story.
62	11	"Hazuki Learns How to Dance!?"; Transliteration: "Hazuki-chan Odori wo Narau!?" (Japanese: はづきちゃん踊りを習う!?)	April 16, 2000
Hazuki's mother, Reiko, wants her daughter to learn traditional Japanese dance, to which Hazuki accepts.
63	12	"The Health Examination's Yellow Cards!"; Transliteration: "Kenkōshinda de Ierō Kādo!" (Japanese: 健康診断でイエローカード!)	April 23, 2000
The day of the second health examination has arrived, and the girls must try their best to complete tasks without accumulating three yellow cards, which will fail them immediately.
64	13	"Doremi, Becomes a Bride?"; Transliteration: "Doremi, Oyome-san ni Naru?" (Japanese: どれみ、お嫁さんになる?)	April 30, 2000
Shinzō Osawa, son of a rancher, asks Doremi to marry him, to which she obviously accepts.
65	14	"Pop's First Love? The Admiration of Mr. Junichi!"; Transliteration: "Poppu no Hatsukoi? Akogare no Junichi-sensei!" (Japanese: ぽっぷの初恋?あこがれの順一先生!)	May 7, 2000
Pop grows affection for her new P.E. teacher, Mr. Junichi.
66	15	"Mother's Day and Mother's Portrait"; Transliteration: "Haha no Hi to Okāsan no Nigaoe" (Japanese: 母の日とお母さんのにがお絵)	May 14, 2000
Shiori, who is motherless, and Masaru, who doesn't care much for his, decide to skip school after being asked to draw them as an art project.
67	16	"First Time Crawling!? Big Panic at the Harukaze Residence!"; Transliteration: "Hajimete no Haihai!? Harukaze-ke, Dai Panikku!" (Japanese: はじめてのハイハイ!? 春風家、大パニック!)	May 21, 2000
Doremi and Pop take Hana home to give Majo Rika and Lala a break, but the baby's newly discovered crawling ability makes things very difficult.
68	17	"Hana's Crawling Exam"; Transliteration: "Hana-chan no Haihai Kenshin" (Japanese: ハナちゃんのハイハイ健診)	May 24, 2000
Conveniently enough, the third health examination challenges the baby's ability to crawl.
69	18	"Dodo Runs Away!"; Transliteration: "Dodo ga Ie de Shichatta!" (Japanese: ドドが家出しちゃった!)	June 4, 2000
Dodo rebels and once again flies away when Doremi works her too hard.
70	19	"Doremi and Hazuki's Big Fight"; Transliteration: "Doremi to Hazuki no Ōgenka" (Japanese: どれみとはづきの大げんか)	June 11, 2000
Doremi and Hazuki argue about how to take care of Hana properly, but any attempt of getting the two girls to make up only makes things worse.
71	20	"I Can Meet Mom! Aiko's Tearful Reunion"; Transliteration: "Okāchan ni Aeru! Aiko Namida no Saikai" (Japanese: お母ちゃんに会える! あいこ涙の再会)	June 25, 2000
Aiko's mother invites her daughter to stay with her for the night, where she learns more about what led to the divorce.
72	21	"Misanthropist Majodon and the Promise of the Herb"; Transliteration: "Ningen-girai no Majodon to Yakusoku no Hābu" (Japanese: 人間嫌いのマジョドンとやくそくのハーブ)	July 2, 2000
After easily passing the fourth health examination, Majo Heart asks the girls to retrieve lavender from the human-hating CFO of the Witch World, Majo Don.
73	22	"The Wizard's Trap: Oyajide Returns"; Transliteration: "Mahōtsukai no Wana: Kaettekita Oyajīde" (Japanese: 魔法使いのワナ 帰ってきたオヤジーデ!)	July 9, 2000
With the passage between the Witch and Wizard Worlds now opened, Oyajide is tasked with capturing Hana.
74	23	"Using New Powers to Rescue Hana!"; Transliteration: "Aratana Ryoku de Hana-chan o Torimodose!" (Japanese: 新たな力でハナちゃんをとりもどせ!)	July 17, 2000
After failing to get Hana from the clutches of Oyajide, the Queen grants the Ojamajo access to more powerful magic to be used when the baby is in danger.
75	24	"Fried Bread Power is Scary!"; Transliteration: "Agepan Pawā Osorubeshi!" (Japanese: あげパンパワーおそるべし!)	July 24, 2000
Kotake and Kimura want to enter a sumo tournament to win a video game and persuade the fried bread-loving Susumu Yanagida to join them.
76	25	"The Mysterious Pretty Boy: Akatsuki-kun Appears!"; Transliteration: "Nazo no Bishōnen: Akatsuki-kun Tōjō!" (Japanese: 謎の美少年·暁くん登場!)	July 30, 2000
A young wizard named Akatsuki is sent out to aid Oyajide's kidnapping efforts and decides to use Doremi to get rid of Hana from the girls.
77	26	"Kanae's Diet Plan"; Transliteration: "Kanae-chan no Daietto Sakusen" (Japanese: かなえちゃんのダイエット作戦)	August 6, 2000
Since her swimsuit from last year no longer fits her, Kanae Iida decides to go on a diet and asks Doremi for help. The Ojamajo take their next Health Examination alongside Hana to check the baby's appetite.
78	27	"The Northern Country Herb and the Important Memory"; Transliteration: "Kitaguni no Hābu to Taisetsu na Omoide" (Japanese: 北国のハーブと大切な思い出)	August 13, 2000
As Majo Ririka visits Misora, Doremi and friends go to Hokkaido to find magic marigolds to cure Hana's rash. They come across Doremi's father who is fishing with an unknown woman.
79	28	"The Targeted Physical Examination"; Transliteration: "Nerawareta Kenkōshindan" (Japanese: ねらわれた健康診断)	August 20, 2000
Oyajide sneaks into the next health examination to once again capture the infant.
80	29	"Everyone Disappears During the Test of Courage!?"; Transliteration: "Kimodameshi de Minna ga Kieta!?" (Japanese: きもだめしでみんなが消えた!?)	August 27, 2000
Doremi's class goes on another trip to Yamauchi's temple to test their courage, this time with Tamaki.
81	30	"Miss Seki's Got A Boyfriend!?"; Transliteration: "Seki-sensei ni Koibito ga Dekita!?" (Japanese: 関先生に恋人ができた!?)	September 3, 2000
Miss Seki has got a boyfriend in summer, so the Witch Apprentices learn about his characteristics.
82	31	"FLAT4 Arrives From The Wizard World!"; Transliteration: "Mahōtsukai no Kuni kara FLAT4 Sanjou!" (Japanese: 魔法使いの国からFLAT4参上!)	September 10, 2000
Fujio, Leon, and Tooru, three more young wizards, join Akatsuki (together known as the FLAT 4) and Oyajide in their question to retrieve the magic baby, while the girls prepare for the seventh health examination.
83	32	"Fly Away! Dodo and the Others' Big Transformation"; Transliteration: "Tondekepyū! Dodo-tachi no Dai Henshin" (Japanese: とんでけピュー!ドドたちの大変身)	September 17, 2000
While Dodo and the other fairies become trapped and transform into the new laptop given to the girls by the Queen, the FLAT 4 successfully kidnap Hana and blame the unknown Oyajide.
84	33	"Say Cheese on the Class Trip!"; Transliteration: "Ensoku wa Minna de Hai Chīzu!" (Japanese: 遠足はみんなでハイチーズ!)	October 1, 2000
On a school trip, Kaori takes charge of taking pictures, but goes overboard and produces some embarrassing photos of everyone.
85	34	"Takoyaki is the Taste of Making Up"; Transliteration: "Takoyaki wa Nakanaori no Aji" (Japanese: たこ焼きは仲なおりの味)	October 8, 2000
Aiko and Onpu argue with each other after Aiko misunderstands the importance of the idol's feelings.
86	35	"Aim for the Top in the Sports Festival!"; Transliteration: "Undōkai de Teppen wo Mezase!" (Japanese: 運動会でてっぺんをめざせ!)	October 15, 2000
The kindergarten students are preparing for the athletic track meet. During practice, it is revealed that Kimitaka has a few cooperation and balance problems.
87	36	"Aiko's Rival! Sports Showdown!"; Transliteration: "Aiko ga Raibaru! Supōtsu Shōbu!!" (Japanese: あいこがライバル!スポーツ勝負!!)	October 22, 2000
The athletic Leon of the FLAT4 challenges Aiko to all sorts of sports, while Hana wanders off chasing a dragonfly.
88	37	"Hana and Pop Both Take Exams!"; Transliteration: "Hana-chan mo Poppu mo Shiken Jyuu!" (Japanese: ハナちゃんもぽっぷも試験中!)	October 29, 2000
Hana's next health examination and Pop's Level 4 apprentice test occur at the same time. Hana's actions begin to affect Pop's test.
89	38	"Hazuki is a Great Director!"; Transliteration: "Hazuki-chan wa Meikantoku!" (Japanese: はづきちゃんは名監督!)	November 12, 2000
Hazuki is chosen to direct the class play for the talent show, but encounters difficulties when she is unable to make her own decisions.
90	39	"A Selfish Child and The Angry Monster"; Transliteration: "Waga Mamakko to Okotta Kaishū" (Japanese: わがままっ子と怒ったかいじゅう)	November 19, 2000
After Hana passes another health examination, Doremi, Hazuki, and Aiko go to see Onpu's filming in Kyoto. The kid who plays Onpu's brother, Chikara, gets jealous of Onpu spending more time with Doremi and the others.
91	40	"The Piano Comes to the Harukaze House!"; Transliteration: "Harukaze-ke ni Piano ga Yattekuru!" (Japanese: 春風家にピアノがやってくる!)	November 26, 2000
After the events of the Sharp movie, Pop asks her mother to teach her how to play the piano.
92	41	"Onpu is Overtaken! The Road to Becoming an Idol!"; Transliteration: "Onpu ni Oitsuke! Aidoru e no Michi!" (Japanese: おんぷに追いつけ!アイドルへの道!)	December 3, 2000
Tooru tries to become an idol like Onpu, but fails in every way. Oyajide attempts another kidnapping.
93	42	"The Witch Who Does Not Cast Magic"; Transliteration: "Mahō wo Tsukawanai Majo" (Japanese: 魔法をつかわない魔女)	December 10, 2000
Majo Heart is revealed to have an adopted daughter, Majo Ran, who refuses to use magic and is trying to get to the Queen's castle.
94	43	"Hana is Our Classmate!?"; Transliteration: "Hana-chan wa Kurasumeito!?" (Japanese: ハナちゃんはクラスメイト!?)	December 17, 2000
Because Majo Rika and Lala are ill, the girls take Hana to school.
95	44	"White Christmas of Happiness"; Transliteration: "Shiawase no Howaito Kurisumasu" (Japanese: 幸せのホワイト·クリスマス)	December 24, 2000
The girls get to spend time with their families on Christmas Eve.
96	45	"Ojamajo Era Drama: The Girl Harboring Ambition!"; Transliteration: "Ojamajo Jidaigeki: Shōjo yo Taishi wo Idake!" (Japanese: おジャ魔女時代劇·少女よ大志をいだけ!)	December 31, 2000
The Ojamajo go into a Storybook world, with the characters portrayed by notable people during the season.
97	46	"The Final Physical Examination: Hana's Mom Will Protect Her!"; Transliteration: "Saigo no Kenkōshindan: Hana-chan wa Mama ga Mamoru!" (Japanese: 最後の健診·ハナちゃんはママが守る!)	January 7, 2001
During the final Health Exam, the girls are taken away by the Flat4. Their thoughts are clouded, yet they carry out their duty of kidnapping Hana.
98	47	"Give Back Hana! The Great Magic Battle"; Transliteration: "Hana-chan wo Kaeshite! Mahō Dai Kessen" (Japanese: ハナちゃんを返して!魔法大決戦)	January 14, 2001
Against Oyajide and Ojijide, the Ojamajo race against the clock for the fate of the Witch and Wizard worlds as well as Hana.
99	48	"Hana's Dying!?"; Transliteration: "Hana-chan ga Shinjau!?" (Japanese: ハナちゃんが死んじゃう!?)	January 21, 2001
Continuing from the last episode, the past Queen of the Witch World curses Hana, making her ill. Only one thing can cure her: the Love Supreme flower in a cursed forest, but if she is not cured, Hana will die.
100	49	"Good Bye, Hana"; Transliteration: "Sayonara Hana-chan" (Japanese: さよならハナちゃん)	January 28, 2001
The four witch apprentices go into the forest and retrieve the Love Supreme flower, but the previous queen tries to stop them. Doremi finally gets the flower, and Hana is saved until they fall asleep for 1000 years. Hana calls out to them, which awakens her mothers. Their crystals broke when they saved Hana, causing them to part ways.
