= Experiment (1988 film) =

- Directed by: Yefim Gamburg
- Written by: Mikhail Gurevich, Olgert Libkin
- Cinematography: Alexander Chekhov
- Music by: P. Ovsyannikov
- Production company: Soyuzmultfilm
- Release date: 1988
- Running time: 7 minutes
- Country: Soviet Union
- Language: Russian

Eksperiment (Russian: Эксперимент, lit. Experiment) is a 1988 Soviet animated fantasy satirical short film about bureaucrats. It is produced by Soyuzmultfilm, directed by Yefim Gamburg, and written by Mikhail Gurevich (named Mikhail Krivich in the credits) and Olgert Libkin (named Olgert Olgin in the credits). It was created in traditional hand-drawn animation technique.

== Plot ==
Experiment is set in a town, where the citizens were forced to walk wherever they need to go because public transportation was very poor for various excuses. To solve this situation, city officials decided to conduct an experiment: people were allowed to fly. Most citizens immediately grew wings and quickly moved to a new lifestyle. However, for some reason wings did not grow on many others. The wingless people decided to become flight supervisors and instructors, and invented strict rules and regulations for the flights. Violations were severely fined, up to cutting of the wings. People started to be afraid of flying and their number started shrinking.

== Discusion ==
Y. Gamburg called his film a "film-warning". The last cadres of the film show the words: "The experiment is going on".

Culturologist Yevgeny Shneider remarked that the film may look funny today, but it was not so funny when it was released.
