= Dan Danglo =

American cartoonist (1925–2020)

- Born: March 1, 1925; Brooklyn, New York City, U.S.
- Died: June 6, 2020 (aged 95)
- Occupations: Animator, comics artist
- Spouse: Rhoda Firestone

Dan Danglo (March 1, 1925 – June 6, 2020) was an American cartoonist and animator who worked for Terrytoons, Warner Bros. Animation and Hanna-Barbera.

Danglo worked as a layout artist on the Tubby the Tuba animated movie and Hulk Hogan's Rock 'n' Wrestling (1985–86). He was an inbetweener on Terrytoons' The Mouse of Tomorrow (1942), the first appearance of Mighty Mouse. He was also the story director for the 1979 TV series Scooby-Doo and Scrappy-Doo and a storyboard artist on Taz-Mania (1991-1995).
