= Experiment (game) =

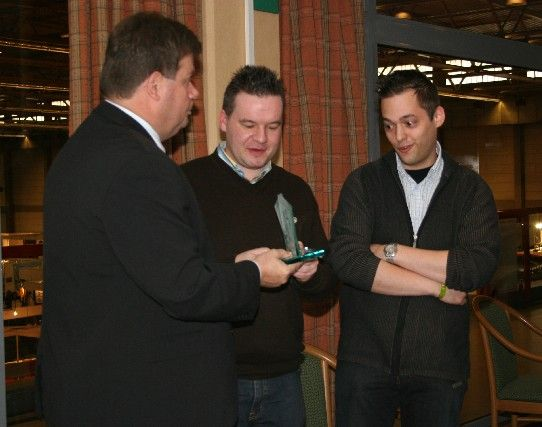
Tim De Rycke (middle) and Sander Vernyns (right) receive the Games & Toys Awards 2006 for best prototype

Experiment is a dedicated deck card game for 3-6 players designed by Tim De Rycke and Sander Vernyns. The illustrations were created by board game designer Kenneth Van Bogget

== Gameplay ==
In the game, the players are working in a laboratory attempting to acquire fluids of specified colors in order to mix them and fulfill the tasks assigned by the professor. Each round is divided into three phases: First, the influence of players is determined. In the second phase, each player gets to choose either a laboratory card or a new task card, and in the third phase players try to complete a task. To do so, a player has to discard lab cards that match the number and color of flasks on the task card. Secondary colors (purple, orange, and green) can be created by combining cards with primary colors (red, yellow, and blue). After 12 rounds the points of the completed tasks are counted. The player with the most points wins the game.

== History ==
The game received the award for best prototype at the Games & Toys Awards in 2006. The price includes printing by Cartamundi and distribution by 999 Games. A second edition is distributed by SandTimer.

Four expansion packs were released between 2009 and 2010:

- Experiment Expansion (2009)
- Empty Erlenmeyer Experiment Expansion (2009)
- Extra Experiment Expansion (2009)
- Exchange Explosion Evaporation Experiment Expansion (2010)
