= Mother Tucker (Family Guy) =

- Family Guy episode
- Episode no.: Season 5 Episode 2
- Directed by: James Purdum
- Written by: Tom Devanney
- Production code: 4ACX31
- Original air date: September 17, 2006

Guest appearances
- Jon Benjamin as Carl Graves; Max Burkholder as Child; Phyllis Diller as Thelma Griffin; Phil LaMarr as Ollie Williams; Joe Lomonaco as Weenie; Tamera Mowry; Anne-Michelle Seiler; Tara Strong as Amy Grant and Rachel Keller; Nicole Sullivan; Gore Vidal as himself; Gedde Watanabe; Wally Wingert

Episode chronology
← Previous "Stewie Loves Lois"	Next → "Hell Comes to Quahog"
- Family Guy season 5

"Mother Tucker" is the second episode of the fifth season of the animated comedy series Family Guy. It originally aired on Fox on September 17, 2006. The episode follows Peter's mother, Thelma, divorcing Peter's father, Francis, and dating news anchorman Tom Tucker. Peter becomes closely attached to Tucker, only for his mother to end the relationship suddenly, leaving Peter feeling abandoned. Meanwhile, Stewie and Brian are employed as DJs on a local radio station, but have creative differences over the tone of the show, which eventually forces Brian to quit.

The episode was written by Tom Devanney and directed by James Purdum. It received mixed reviews for its storyline, and many cultural references. According to Nielsen ratings, it was viewed in 9.23 million homes in its original airing. The episode featured guest performances by Jon Benjamin, Max Burkholder, Phyllis Diller, Phil LaMarr, Joe Lomonaco, Tamera Mowry, Anne-Michelle Seiler, Tara Strong, Nicole Sullivan, Gore Vidal, Gedde Watanabe, and Wally Wingert along with several recurring guest voice actors for the series. "Mother Tucker" was released on DVD along with twelve other episodes from the season on September 18, 2007.

== Plot ==
Peter's mother, Thelma, visits the Griffin family home, and alerts her son, Peter that she has finally left his father, Francis. In an attempt to find her a new husband, Peter's wife, Lois, takes her to a meeting for "single people," where she meets local news anchor Tom Tucker. Thelma and Tom begin dating, which upsets Peter, causing him to attempt to sabotage the new relationship. He is eventually persuaded by Tom that he should let his mother be happy, and the two begin bonding. Eventually, his mother suddenly ends the relationship, however, causing Peter to believe it is his fault. The next day, Peter learns that it is important for fathers and sons to spend time together, and tells Tom that he should spend more time with his own son, Jake, instead.

Meanwhile, after interrupting a broadcast of local radio station WQHG's program "Weenie and the Butt", Brian gets his own radio talk show, when one of the station's producers compliments his speaking voice. Attempting to have an intelligent dialogue with his listeners, and distancing himself from the constant overuse of sound effects by "Weenie and the Butt", Brian is immediately heckled by Stewie's prank phone calls in an attempt to get him into trouble or fired. After first planning to cancel Brian's show following the incident with the comments made from the prank calls, the station's producer later announces that he actually loved the prank calls and decides to let Brian keep his show but he has to hire Stewie as co-host. Brian insists that Stewie keeps his mouth shut when he is broadcasting but unfortunately for him Stewie then steals Brian's show and turns his sophisticated talk show into a lewd, raucous, shock jock-style comedy show called "Dingo and the Baby", much to Brian's chagrin, who is reluctant to accept the new format. Upon discovering that people love the new show, however, Brian decides to play along with Stewie's idea. However, when author Gore Vidal, whom Brian had contacted for an interview on his original show, walks into one of his "Dingo and the Baby" broadcasts and leaves in disgust, Brian quits his job in shame. The show is soon replaced by one featuring Cleveland and Quagmire, entitled "Dark Chocolate and the Rod".

== Production ==
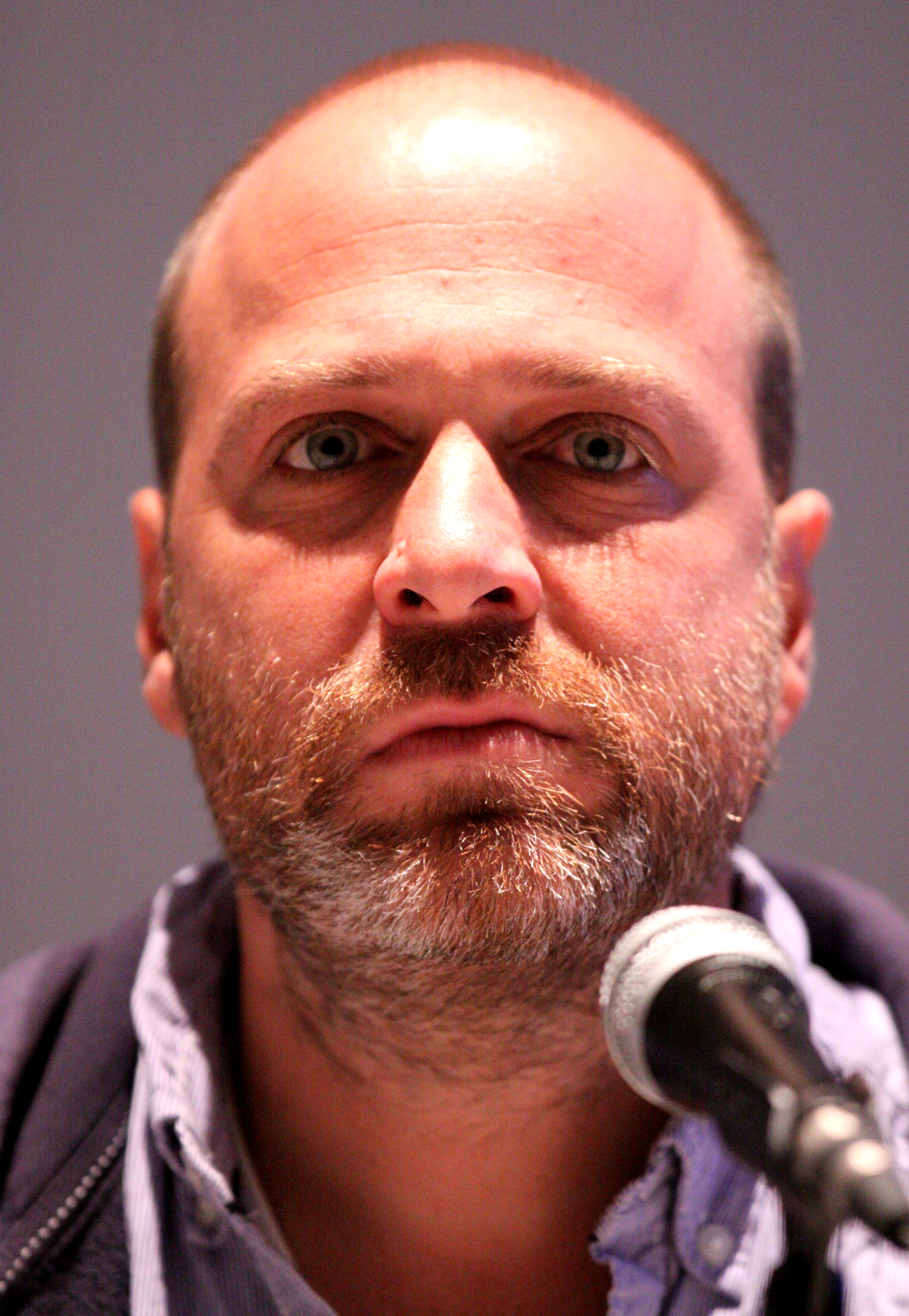
H. Jon Benjamin guest starred in the episode.

The episode was written by series regular Tom Devanney, and directed by James Purdum. During the "Weenie and the Butt" scene, several sound effects can be heard. Each of these were recorded individually by people who have sung at such venues as the Academy Awards, and other high publicity events. Family Guy creator Seth MacFarlane has commented that these sound effect recordings took much longer than expected, as they did not sound professional enough. The episode featured guest performances by actress Phyllis Diller, who has portrayed Peter's mother Thelma in various episodes, and Tamera Mowry in her third appearance. Author Gore Vidal appeared as himself in the episode. In the scene involving Thelma trying to convince Peter to accept that she is dating Tucker, she comments, "Tom here has won a local Emmy for his work with the retardeds". The Fox Broadcasting Company has a specific rule stating that the word "retard" or "retarded" cannot be said on their network, but this scene was nevertheless permitted. MacFarlane has commented that he cannot understand why the word is not permitted on Fox, given that it is allowed on other networks. According to MacFarlane and other episode commentators, the scene provoked an angry reaction among the mental health community.

There were several scenes throughout this episode that were removed from the script, and not broadcast. One of these comes just after Tom Tucker apologizes to Peter about losing his temper; it was intended that Jake Tucker would appear, and the origin of his upside-down face would be revealed. The scene with "The Peanuts Reunion" was originally meant for the season four episode "Patriot Games", but was moved to this episode to ease time constraints in "Patriot Games". The scene was described by 20th Century Fox worker Leann Siegel as being depressing.

"Mother Tucker", along with the twelve other episodes from Family Guy's fifth season, were released on a three-disc DVD set in the United States on September 18, 2007. The sets included brief audio commentaries by MacFarlane and various crew and cast members for several episodes, a collection of deleted scenes and animatics, a special mini-feature which discusses the process behind drawing Peter Griffin, and mini-feature entitled "Toys, Toys Galore".

In addition to the regular cast, voice actor Jon Benjamin, child actor Max Burkholder, actress Phyllis Diller, voice actor Phil LaMarr, actor Joe Lomonaco, voice actress Tamera Mowry, actress Anne-Michelle Seiler, voice actress Tara Strong, voice actress Nicole Sullivan, author Gore Vidal, actor Gedde Watanabe, and voice actor Wally Wingert guest starred in the episode. Recurring guest voice actors Chris Cox, Ralph Garman, writer David A. Goodman, writer Mike Henry, writer Danny Smith, writer Alec Sulkin, and writer John Viener made minor appearances in the episode.

== Cultural references ==
The episode opens with the Griffin family attending the local Airshow in Quahog, and are shown to be anxiously awaiting one of the pilots to crash. After a pilot successfully lands, Peter expresses his boredom and states that he would rather be home watching "that video from The Ring". In a flashback, Peter begins playing the video (after first being warned), albeit with the 1987 film Mannequin appearing instead and having the same effect as the cursed tape. Deciding to stay at the airshow to watch their neighbor (Glenn Quagmire) perform, he flies his plane through several billboards—specifically through the crotch of the women's images on said billboards—including those for Veronica Mars, The Simple Life and On the Record w/ Greta Van Susteren (which he can only do after "getting some help" from a Jack Daniel's Tennessee whiskey billboard).

Returning home, the Griffin family decide to watch a television show entitled Roundtable, featuring guests Al Michaels, Harold Ramis, Ray Romano and Kermit the Frog. Once Thelma appears, and alerts Peter of her split-up with his father, Peter is shocked, stating that the same happened at the Peanuts reunion, with Charlie Brown then appearing as a punk rock drug dealer.

When Peter finds Thelma and Tom in bed, a cutaway shows Stewie reading a quotation from the movie Harold and Maude.

After Thelma leaves Tom, he begins showing Peter more affection, causing Lois to believe it to be strange. Peter then states that it is no stranger than when Darth Vader from the film franchise Star Wars was a parking attendant. Vader is then shown in the contemporary world as a failure, and making minimum wage. This scene, as with all scenes that contain references to Star Wars or its characters, was sent to Lucasfilm for approval, in order to protect copyright. After Stewie takes over Brian's radio show, the two begin playing random sound clips from various films and television shows, including dialogue from the 1993 drama film Philadelphia, which was acknowledged as a mistake by Stewie. Other movie clips used by Brian and Stewie are “Oh sexy girlfriend!” from Sixteen Candles (1984) and “Don’t you do it!” from An Officer and a Gentleman (1982).

In an attempt to rebel against Tom Tucker, Peter decides to reach for the freezer to take out some ice cream during dinner, much to the chagrin of Tucker, who attempts to stop him. As Peter lifts a spoon of ice cream to his mouth, he is warned by Tucker several times not to eat it. When he does, however, Tucker repeatedly spanks him, in reference to the 1979 drama feature Kramer vs. Kramer (even though the spanking does not occur in the movie, but it does occur in the 1995 Indian remake, Akele Hum Akele Tum). After author Gore Vidal appears at the radio station Brian had invited him to speak at, Vidal quickly leaves after he finds the show to be low-brow. This causes Brian to quit the show, noting that he has become "worse of a sell-out" than when Stewie appeared in a Butterfinger commercial. Stewie is then shown eating a Butterfinger, and says "Nobody better lay a finger on my Butterfinger", which is a parody of the many Butterfinger commercials featuring Bart Simpson, and utters the annoyed grunt, D'oh!, a phrase used regularly by The Simpsons character Homer Simpson. The bit is also a reference to the negative criticism and similarities between Family Guy and The Simpsons.

== Reception ==
In a slight decrease from the previous week, the episode was viewed in 9.23 million homes in its original airing, according to Nielsen ratings. The episode also acquired a 3.3 in the 18–49 demographic, slightly edging out The Simpsons, in addition to series creator Seth MacFarlane's second show American Dad!, in both rating and total viewership.

Reviews of the episode were mixed, calling it a "slow start to the season." Dan Iverson of IGN reviewed the episode positively, noting that the episode "would make even the most anti-Family Guy television viewers out there laugh pretty hard." Iverson went on to comment, however, that "it probably won't be remembered as fondly as some of the episodes from the first few seasons." For him, the "funniest aspect of the episode" was the radio scene, in which "we get the impression that [radio jockeys] are immature, simple-minded idiots." Brett Love of TV Squad reviewed the episode slightly more negatively, stating that "the whole Peter story just didn't do much for me." Love did find that the "Stewie and Brian stuff was the best part of the episode," but went on to proclaim that "there are 20 more episodes to get it right." In his review of the Family Guy Volume 5 box set, Francis Rizzo of DVD Talk wrote that the radio subplot is "a perfect parody of everything that's wrong in radio."
