= Experiment (1800 ship) =

History

Great Britain
- Name: Experiment
- Owner: 1802: Lambert, Ross & Co.
- Builder: Gillett & Co., Calcutta
- Fate: Lost 1807

General characteristics
- Tons burthen: 475, or 500 (bm)
- Propulsion: Sail

Experiment was built at Calcutta in 1800, and was lost in 1807. In between, she made one voyage for the British East India Company (EIC).

EIC voyage: Captain John Palmer left Calcutta on 24 August 1801, bound for England. Experiment was at Culpee on 29 September, reached Saint Helena on 4 January 1802, and arrived at Deptford on 27 March.

Fate: Experiment was listed in the 1807 volume of Lloyd's Register with Farmer, master, Gillet & Co. owner, and trade London—India. She was lost in 1807. She appeared for the last time in the 1808 volume of Lloyd's Register with unchanged information.
