= Jan Svochak =

American animator

Jan Svochak (July 7, 1925 – September 6, 2006) was a master animator who worked in the animation industry from the late 1940s through the 1990s. He was born in Czechoslovakia in 1925. He started out as an inbetweener for Martin Taras on the Baby Huey, Little Audrey, and Herman and Katnip shorts. Some of the studios he worked with were: Famous Studios, Pelican, Elektra, Zanders, Perpetual Motion Pictures, Buzzco, J.J. Sedelmaier Productions, Inc. His biggest success came in the 1960s when he began animating the Punchy character for the Hawaiian Punch ad campaign, as well as in the 1970s when he animated commercials for Cocoa Puffs.

In the 1930s, Svochak came to live in America with his family. He served in the United States Army tank corps during World War II, where he aided in the liberation of Jews from the Dachau concentration camp. After the war, he came back to New York City and found a job at Famous Studios. Later, in 1975–76, he was approached by Richard Williams to supply extra animation for Raggedy Ann & Andy: A Musical Adventure.
