= Playboy's Dark Justice =

TV series

Playboy's Dark Justice is a half-hour, computer-animated, hardcore pornographic TV series shown on Playboy TV premiering on September 3, 2000, and running for 20 (of an intended 26) episodes until 2001. It was perhaps the first and only show of its kind created.

== Plot ==
Unlike most talk, variety, and reality series on Playboy TV, Dark Justice has characters and story arcs. The show features a heroine named Justina (voiced by Veronica Hart), who fights crime as part of a vigilante force in a dystopian world in Metro City in 2120. The plots inevitably lead to Justina and others in sexual situations.

== Production ==
The series was directed by Michael Ninn, with Robert C. England as technical director, lead animator, motion-capture actor, and the voice of Wendell, and produced by Ninn and Hart (among others) through Hope Ranch Productions, and featured a number of porn stars as voice actors and models for motion capture animated with 3D Studio Max and Character Studio.

Dark Justice was the only completed film and television production from Hope Ranch until its acquisition by Pure Play Media in 2002 and name change to Ninn Worx. The name "Hope Ranch" appears to have been later used for the alternate reality game Kronos480BC promoting the Ninn Worx production "The Four".

== Characters ==
- Justina
- Lacy White
- Trevor & Wendell
- The Sarge
- Lance Larson
- Lonnie Lovet
- Lou Stone
- Taffy Dugan
- Mayor Julio Camarones
- Chili "Bean" Johnson

=== Villains ===
- Mr. Big
- Morell Dekay
- Miz Behave
- Won Hung Low
- Regina
- Doctor Dick
