= Passion of Spies =

- Directed by: Yefim Gamburg
- Written by: Lazar Lagin
- Cinematography: Mikhail Druyan
- Music by: Georgiy Martynyuk
- Production company: Soyuzmultfilm
- Release date: 1967
- Running time: 20 minutes
- Country: Soviet Union
- Language: Russian

Passion of Spies (Russian: Шпионские страсти, Shpionskiye strasti) is a 1967 Soyuzmultfilm's animated black-and-white film directed by Yefim Gamburg. It parodies spy and detective fiction clichés and got a status of a cult film.

== Plot ==
In the Soviet Union, a remarkable dental apparatus is developed, catching the attention of foreign intelligence chief Shtampf, who suffers from a severe toothache. Learning of this state-of-the-art invention, Shtampf devises a plan to steal it, mobilizing his top agents to gather intelligence and execute the heist. However, Soviet counterintelligence quickly uncovers their plans. A series of covert operations unfolds, culminating in a car chase where a musician-turned-chauffeur, inadvertently caught in the action, is injured while aiding the Soviets.

In Part 2, the focus shifts to the chauffeur's idle son, Kolychev, a loafer and aspiring hipster who deceives his parents to fund a lavish outing at a high-end restaurant. There, he falls prey to a seductive foreign agent who traps him in a scheme: after racking up an exorbitant bill, he is offered a way out—planting a bomb beneath the prized dental apparatus in exchange for the debt being erased. With the stakes escalating, Soviet agents—including General Sidorcev, Colonel Sidorov, Captain Sidorin, and Lieutenant Sidorkin—spring into action. Enlisting the help of ordinary citizens like the resourceful taxi driver Kolychov and even a precocious infant, Kuka Vorobyov, they thwart the espionage plot, reform Kolychev, and secure a decisive victory for Soviet counterintelligence.

== Animators ==
- Tatyana Pomerantseva
- Elvira Maslova
- Ivan Davydov
- Joseph Kuroyan
- Renata Mirenkova
- Olga Orlova
- Dmitriy Anpilov
- Natalia Bogomolova
- Antonina Aleshina
- Yuriy Butyrin
