= The Boy Who Saw the Wind =

- Directed by: Kazuki Ōmori (chief); Toshiya Shinohara (animation)
- Screenplay by: Izuru Narushima
- Based on: The Boy Who Saw the Wind by C. W. Nicol
- Produced by: Yutaka Nukaya; Jukkō Ozawa; Yumiko Kuga
- Starring: Yumi Adachi; Aki Maeda; Keiko Toda; Mari Natsuki; Takashi Naitō
- Cinematography: Hajime Hasegawa
- Edited by: Kazuhiko Seki
- Music by: Tamiya Terashima
- Production company: Brain's Base
- Distributed by: Buena Vista International Japan
- Release date: 22 July 2000 (Japan)
- Running time: 97 minutes
- Country: Japan
- Language: Japanese
- Box office: ¥170,000,000

The Boy Who Saw The Wind (Japanese: 風を見た少年, Hepburn: Kaze o Mita Shōnen) is an anime film based on the novel by C. W. Nicol. Directed by Kazuki Ōmori, it was released theatrically in Japan by Buena Vista International on 22 July 2000. It was also broadcast in Latin America by HBO, France by AK Video, Spain by HBO and Russia by MC Entertainment. The film was later adapted into a play by Japan's Atom Theater Company.

== Plot ==
The young boy Amon has the mysterious power of the ancient "wind people". His father, a brilliant military scientist of the Golden Snake Empire, does not want to use his son's powers for weapons of mass destruction. He burns his papers and lab and tries to escape from the country with his family, but is killed in the attempt. Amon is taken prisoner by the Golden Snake Empire's despotic ruler, Branik, who intends for Amon's powers to produce a new super-weapon. Amon escapes to Heart Island when an eagle explains to him how to see the wind and fly. On Heart Island, Amon learns a bit about the history of the wind people from a bear. He then flies off and settles in a small fishing village. There, he befriends a young girl his own age, Maria. When Branik and the Golden Snake Empire launch an attack on the village, Maria's family are killed and Maria flees with Amon. Eventually Amon and Maria are recaptured, Maria thrown in prison and Amon forced to work on weapons. Amon joins a small revolution against Branik.

== Characters ==
Amon
A young boy with powers of the ancient wind people. He can create small balls of light, called "light play", and converse with animals. Eventually he discovers the ability to see the wind and fly, as well as other ancient powers.
Branik
The despotic ruler of the Golden Snake Empire.
Maria
A young girl from a fishing village, she befriends Amon.
Lucia
A scientist, assistant to Amon's father, who becomes the Golden Snake Empire's head weapons scientist.

== Reception ==
A reviewer at Mania.com commended the film for its "beautifully drawn and animated" graphics and "top-notch" cinematography. However, they criticised the film's imitation of Hayao Miyazaki's films.
