= Ograblenie po... =

Ograblenie po…
- Directed by: Yefim Gamburg
- Written by: Mikhail Lipskerov
- Starring: Eduard Nazarov; Vsevolod Larionov; Gennady Morozov; Aleksandr Baranov
- Music by: Gennady Gladkov
- Production company: Soyuzmultfilm
- Release date: 1978
- Running time: 18 minutes
- Country: Soviet Union
- Language: Russian

Robbery, ... Style (Ограбление по..., translit. Ograblenie po...) is a 1978 Soviet parody animated film by Yefim Gamburg. It is split into four parts: Robbery, American Style; Robbery, French Style; Robbery, Italian Style, and the last, though untitled, clearly refers to the USSR. Each segment is a parody of 1960-1970s crime films in the corresponding countries.

== Plot ==
The opening frames include a parody of the Metro-Goldwyn-Mayer logo, with Cheburashka replacing Tanner.

The American part parodies Hollywood action films with exaggerated explosions, car chases, striptease, violent deaths and a cold-blooded corrupt sheriff character based on Marlon Brando. The French segment parodies film noir, mostly Action Man and Any Number Can Win with Jean Gabin. The Italian episode parodies colorful Italian films, in particular Yesterday, Today and Tomorrow and Divorce Italian Style with Marcello Mastroianni, as well as Treasure of San Gennaro.

In the final 2-minute Soviet part two robbers (drawn after Saveli Kramarov and Stanislav Chekan) are trying to rob a savings bank, but it is always closed for cleanup or repairs. A militsioner at the end parodies Mikhail Zharov's Aniskin character. After Kramarov immigrated to the US, the segment was cut from the film and restored only in 1988.

== Characters ==
All the main characters are caricatures of popular actors of the 1960s and 1970s:

- Robbery, American Style
  - Sheriff – Marlon Brando
  - Fatal woman – Elizabeth Taylor
  - Archer, smothered by a kiss – Telly Savalas
  - Stripper – Kirk Douglas
- Robbery, French Style
  - Old robber – Jean Gabin, Fernandel (when he poses as "plumber Jean Follenvie" in the bank)
  - The chief of the prison is Paul Préboist
  - Young robber (husband of the mistress of the bar) – Alain Delon
  - The mistress of the bar is Brigitte Bardot
  - Pretendingly sleeping bar visitor – Louis de Funès
  - Bank guard – Noël Roquevert
  - Bulky policeman – Lino Ventura
- Robbery, Italian Style
  - Mario Brindisi – Marcello Mastroianni
  - Lucia, his wife – Sophia Loren
  - Police officer – Alberto Sordi
- Robbery, Soviet Style
  - 1st robber – Stanislav Chekan
  - 2nd robber – Savely Kramarov
  - Militsioner – Mikhail Zharov

== Voice cast ==
- Eduard Nazarov
- Vsevolod Larionov
- Gennady Morozov
- Aleksandr Baranov
