= Dog in Boots =

- D'Artagnan ("the Dog") and the three musketeers in blue musketeer costumes. From left to right: the Fatty (Porthos), D'Artagnan, the nameless Athos, and the Handsome (Aramis).
- Directed by: Yefim Gamburg
- Written by: Vladimir Valutskiy
- Starring: Nikolai Karachentsov; Irina Muravyova; Vsevolod Larionov
- Cinematography: Mikhail Druyan
- Music by: Rock Atelier
- Production company: Soyuzmultfilm
- Release date: 1981
- Running time: 20 minutes
- Country: USSR
- Language: Russian

Dog in Boots (Russian: Пёс в сапогах, Pyos v sapogakh), also known as Pup in Boots is a 1981 Soyuzmultfilm's animated parody film directed by Yefim Gamburg. It is a musical adaptation of the classic 1844 Alexandre Dumas story of d'Artagnan and The Three Musketeers.

Dog in Boots parodies costume and historical drama films, particularly the musical miniseries d'Artagnan and Three Musketeers (1978) that was incredibly popular in the Soviet Union. The concept of this film is similar to the 1981 series Dogtanian and the Three Muskehounds: the main characters are dogs, while Cardinal Richelieu's evil guards and Milady are cats.

The novelization Pyos v sapogakh, ili Novye priklyucheniya treh mushketerov (lit. 'Dog in boots, or New Adventures of the Three Musketeers') for children, authored by Vladimir Valutskiy, was published by Strekoza Press in 2004. In 2006 TVIK-LIREK released an audiobook CD based on Valutskiy's story. In 2009 Dog in Boots was fully restored by Krupny Plan and released on DVD as a part of Full Picture and Sound Restoration series. The original film copy was provided by Gosfilmofond.

== Plot ==
The film begins with a young Gascon Dog running on the road to Paris and singing that he is "provincial yet principled", "fameless, but direct and honest", and "if service, let it be service to the king". He sees two carriages and a beautiful bichon nearby. Anne of Austria, sitting unseen inside one carriage, hands a diamond necklace to the Duke of Buckingham. Then both carriages leave the place. The whole scene is seen by a red cat named Milady, who reports on the meeting to Cardinal Richelieu's gray cat (the Count).

Following the royal carriage, the Dog meets three dog musketeers in blue Musketeers of the Guard costumes: the Fatty (Porthos), the Handsome (Aramis) and the Lofty (Athos). The dogs get into an argument with the newcomer, but their quarrel is quickly interrupted by a throng of Cardinal's cats. The dogs, despite being greatly outnumbered, win the ensuing fight and become best friends. The musketeer dogs tell d'Artagnan that the beautiful bichon is the favorite dog of Anne of Austria (a reference to Constance Bonacieux). D'Artagnan sneaks into the king's palace and reveals his feeling to the bichon singing that "I am not thoroughbred, which is a minus, but I am noble hearted, and that is a plus" and that he is "ready to fight a dozen cats" for her. In response, the bichon asks for his help. She explains that The Queen is in trouble, because at the next ball she is expected to wear a diamond necklace presented to the Duke of Buckingham. The ball is tomorrow, but the diamonds have already left France. The bichon gives d'Artagnan the Duke's glove to track his scent.

D'Artagnan rushes to England immediately and three musketeers follow him. Richelieu's gray cat orders to stop them at all costs. Milady arranges several traps: "the Fatty" is lured into a cat ambush by a chain of sausages; "the Handsome", who dreams of becoming a herding dog, is distracted with a herd of sheep who turn out to be cats in sheep skins; "the Lofty" stays behind to fight a cat gang chasing the dogs and buy his friend precious time. D'Artagnan alone finally arrives to England. Trying to find the Buckingham's palace he meets an English Dog Detective, but after smelling the glove the Detective is only able to deduce that "it belongs to a human", who "carries a heavy oak stick". Finally, the Duke's Foxhound helps d'Artagnan to find the way. He steals the diamond necklace from Buckingham's palace, defeats Milady and returns just in time for the ball. Anne of Austria's reputation is unblemished. He wins Bichon's heart, rejoin with friends and earns a blue musketeer costume.

== Characters ==
- Nikolai Karachentsov as the Dog
- Irina Muravyova as Queen's Bichon, Milady and Bat
- Alexander Shirvindt as the Handsome
- Yuri Volyntsev as the Fatty
- Valentin Gaft as the Lofty
- Yevgeny Vesnik as Richelieu's cat
- Lev Durov as a Foxhound and Fisherman's dog
- Vasily Livanov as English Detective
- Vsevolod Larionov as Buckingham's watchdog
- Grigory Shpigel as one-eyed cat-bully

== Production ==
Dog in Boots was created in traditional hand-drawn animation technique with character design by Sergey Marakasov. Music was performed by Kris Kelmi's band Rock Atelier with lyrics written by Mikhail Libin.

The main character (d'Artagnan, "the Dog") was voiced and sung by Nikolai Karachentsov. Animators later complimented Karachentsov that his performance let them literally see his character, so they did not have to invent him. Dog's songs, in his opinion, should not be sung or even screamed, but "yelled". Karachentsov said that while working in studio he "spied on masters of cartoon voice acting, such as Oleg Tabakov", and tried to learn from them.

Animators

- Natalya Bogomolova (Наталья Богомолова)
- Vladimir Vyshegorodtsev (Владимир Вышегородцев)
- Galina Zebrova (Галина Зеброва)
- Aleksandr Mazaev (Александр Мазаев)
- Elvira Maslova (Эльвира Маслова)
- Marina Rogova (Марина Рогова)
- Renata Mirenkova (Рената Миренкова)
- Aleksey Bukin (Алексей Букин)
- Yuriy Kuzyurin (Юрий Кузюрин)

== Reception ==
Dog in Boots instantly became very popular. It was cited as one of the films that have opened "new verges" in Yefim Gamburg's talent, such as "lyrical mood, elegance, fanciful fantasy". Nikolai Karachentsov and Irina Muravyova performances were praised. Yefim Gamburg recalled that shooting Dog in Boots was "a real feast" and not only for him, but "for the whole staff", because the studio animators enjoyed actors' performance and cinematography, also "the theme was merry, and the characters were funny". Bosporus magazine's critic mentions that "there is no such person among our readers who haven't seen" Dog in Boots, which he calls "simple and funny parody". M. Ivanov of Film.ru comments that there are a lot of "wonderful songs" and that "children will love it".

Kris Kelmi gained his fame as a composer partially thanks to his work on this film. Several songs from Dog in Boots became Soviet hits, most notably the final duet between the Dog and the Bichon ("We have suffered, which is a minus, but now we are together, and that is a plus"). These songs were equally popular with Mikhail Boyarsky's of the d'Artagnan and Three Musketeers (1978), the miniseries that Dog in Boots parodies.
