= Yefim Gamburg =

Russian animation director (1925–2000)

- Born: Yefim Abramovich Gamburg; 10 June 1925; Moscow, USSR
- Died: 13 June 2000 (aged 75); Moscow, Russia
- Occupation: Animation director

Yefim Abramovich Gamburg (Russian: Ефим Абрамович Гамбург; 10 June 1925 — 13 June 2000) was a Soviet and Russian animation director known for parody and musical cartoons. He was named Honoured Worker of the Arts Industry of the RSFSR in 1986. Member of ASIFA.

== Biography ==
Yefim Gamburg was born in Moscow into a Jewish family. From 1942 he took part in the Great Patriotic War as a private and a motorcyclist of the trophy brigade of the 39th Army. He was wounded in action and awarded the Order of the Red Star in 1945.

He studied at the Art faculty of the Lenin Moscow Pedagogical State University and joined Soyuzmultfilm in 1955 where he worked as an animator. He made his directorial debut in 1964, creating several Fitil episodes. Gamburg became one of the first Soviet directors to work in the genre of parody film with cartoons such as Passion of Spies (1967), Robbery, ... Style (1978) and Dog in Boots (1981).

In 1976 he directed a Blue Puppy animated musical film with the main character also being a parody of Charlie Chaplin. It was noted for an innovative art style, with characters drawn using spots of colored India ink which allowed for a variety of shapeshifting effects. The songs were performed by Alisa Freindlich, Andrei Mironov and Mikhail Boyarsky, some of the leading actors of their time.

In 1989 Gamburg directed the first Soviet-American cartoon Stereotypes co-produced by Laurien Productions (California) which, as the title implies, ridiculed the stereotypes of Americans and Russians. In 1990 he founded and headed his own animation studio Gamburgskiy Schot (renamed to Renechans in 1991) where he worked on the Romeo and Juliet segment for the Shakespeare: The Animated Tales Russian-British series.

Yefim Gamburg died in 2000 and was buried at the Donskoye Cemetery in Moscow. His last 25-minute cartoon Well Overlooked Old based on Mikhail Bulgakov's The Fatal Eggs novel was finished by the film crew only in 2003.

== Filmography ==
- Fitil / Фитиль (1964—1986)
- The Origin of Species / Происхождение вида (1966)
- Passion of Spies / Шпионские страсти (1967)
- Slonyonok / Слонёнок (1967)
- Old Testaments / Старые заветы (1968)
- What Is Good and What Is Bad / Что такое хорошо и что такое плохо (1969)
- Attention, Wolves! / Внимание, волки! (1970)
- For Adults Only, Issue 1 / Только для взрослых, выпуск 1 (1971)
- Land Where You Live / Край, в котором ты живёшь (1972)
- Index / Индекс (1972)
- For Adults Only, Issue 2 / Только для взрослых, выпуск 2 (1973)
- A Song of Friendship / Песня о дружбе (1973)
- For Adults Only, Issue 3 / Только для взрослых, выпуск 3 (1974)
- Fantik / Фантик (1975)
- School Break №1 / Переменка № 1 (1976)
- Blue Puppy / Голубой щенок (1976)
- We Paint October / Мы рисуем Октябрь (1976)
- Robbery, ... Style / Ограбление по… (1978)
- Dog in Boots / Пёс в сапогах (1981)
- Paradoxes, Rock-Style / Парадоксы в стиле рок (1982)
- O, more, more! / О, море, море (1983)
- Contacts and Conflicts / Контакты и конфликты (1984)
- Experiment / Эксперимент (1988)
- Stereotypes / Стереотипы (1989)
- Shakespeare: The Animated Tales: Romeo and Juliet (1992)
- Well Overlooked Old / Хорошо забытое старое (2003)

== See also ==
- History of Russian animation
