= 1927 in animation =

Events in 1927 in animation.

== Events ==
=== August ===
- August 22: Walt Disney releases Alice in the Big League, it is the final film in the Alice Comedy series.

=== September ===
- September 5: Walt Disney releases Trolley Troubles, which marks the official debut of his first successful animated star, Oswald the Lucky Rabbit.

== Films released ==
- 9 January – Felix the Cat Dines and Pines (United States)
- 10 January – Alice the Golf Bug (United States)
- 23 January – Pedigreedy (United States)
- 24 January – Alice Foils the Pirates (United States)
- February – Felix the Cat Stars in Stripes (United States)
- 6 February – Icy Eyes (United States)
- 7 February – Alice at the Carnival (United States)
- 21 February – Alice at the Rodeo (United States)
- 4 March – Cracked Ice (United States)
- 6 March – Felix the Cat Sees 'Em in Season (United States)
- 7 March – Alice the Collegiate (United States)
- 20 March – Barn Yarns (United States)
- 21 March – Alice in the Alps (United States)
- 3 April – Germ Mania (United States)
- 4 April – Alice's Auto Race (United States)
- 18 April – Alice's Circus Daze (United States)
- 27 April – Sax Appeal (United States)
- 1 May – Eye Jinks (United States)
- 2 May – Alice's Knaughty Knight (United States)
- 6 May – When Snow Flies (United States)
- 12 May – One Man Dog (United States)
- 15 May – Roameo (United States)
- 16 May – Alice's Three Bad Eggs (United States)
- 29 May – Felix the Cat Ducks His Duty (United States)
- 30 May – Alice's Picnic (United States)
- 12 June – Dough-Nutty (United States)
- 13 June – Alice's Channel Swim (United States)
- 26 June – "Loco"Motive (United States)
- 27 June – Alice in the Klondike (United States)
- 10 July – Art for Heart's Sake (United States)
- 11 July – Alice's Medicine Show (United States)
- 14 July – The Travel-Hog (United States)
- 22 July – Small Town Sheriff (United States)
- 25 July – Alice the Whaler (United States)
- 7 August – Jack From All Trades (United States)
- 8 August – Alice the Beach Nut (United States)
- 21 August:
  - A Hole In One (United States)
  - The Non-Stop Fright view (United States)
- 22 August – Alice in the Big League (United States)
- 4 September – Wise Guise (United States)
- 5 September – Trolley Troubles (United States)
- 18 September – Flim Flam Films (United States)
- 19 September – Oh Teacher (United States)
- 2 October – Felix the Cat Switches Witches (United States)
- 3 October – The Mechanical Cow (United States)
- 16 October – No Fuelin' (United States)
- 17 October – Great Guns! (United States)
- 20 October – Daze and Knights (United States)
- 31 October – All Wet (United States)
- 13 November – Uncle Tom's Crabbin' (United States)
- 14 November – The Ocean Hop (United States)
- 27 November – Whys and Other Whys (United States)
- 28 November – The Banker's Daughter (United States)
- 11 December – Felix the Cat Hits the Deck (United States)
- 12 December – Empty Socks (United States)
- 25 December – Felix the Cat Behind in Front (United States)
- 26 December – Rickety Gin (United States)

== Births ==
=== January ===
- January 6: Stan Vanderbeek, American film director and animator (Breath Death), (d. 1984).
- January 17:
  - Eartha Kitt, American singer, actress, comedian, dancer and activist (voice of Yzma in The Emperor's New Groove franchise, Queen Vexus in My Life as a Teenage Robot, Fortune Teller in the American Dad! episode "Dope and Faith", Cool Cat in the Wonder Pets! episode "Save the Cool Cat and the Hip Hippo!", Mrs. Franklin in The Magic School Bus episode "Going Batty", Lioness #1 in The Wild Thornberrys episode "Flood Warning", the Snow Queen in Happily Ever After: Fairy Tales for Every Child episode "The Snow Queen", herself in The Simpsons episode "Once Upon a Time in Springfield"), (d. 2008).
  - John Sparey, American animator (Walt Disney Animation Studios, Crusader Rabbit, Calvin and the Colonel, The Funny Company, Underdog, Tennessee Tuxedo and His Tales, Hanna-Barbera, Bakshi Animation, Tom and Jerry: The Movie, The Swan Princess, animated the main titles for Bobby's World), scene planner (Starchaser: The Legend of Orin, The Chipmunk Adventure) and director (Mighty Mouse: The New Adventures, Film Roman), (d. 2010).
- January 24: Marvin Kaplan, American actor (voice of Choo-Choo in Top Cat), (d. 2016).
- January 28: Betty Harford, American actress (voice of Gumba in The Gumby Show), (d. 2025).
- January 29: Peter Fernandez, American actor, voice director and writer (voice of the title character in Alakazam the Great, Buttons Brilliant and Johnny in Gigantor, the title character and Racer X in Speed Racer, Dr. Mariner and Piper in Marine Boy, various characters in Superbook, Max and Grimm the Dragon in Princess Gwenevere and the Jewel Riders, Benton Tarantella, Robot Randy, Conway the Contaminationist, The Shadow, Rich Guy, and Robot Randy in Courage the Cowardly Dog, Headmaster Spritle and Speed Racer Sr. in Speed Racer: The Next Generation, additional voices in Astro Boy, Ace Ventura: Pet Detective and Kenny the Shark), (d. 2010).
- January 31: Norm Prescott, American animation producer (co-founder of Filmation), (d. 2005).

=== February ===
- February 2: Ann Gillis, American actress (voice of Faline in Bambi), (d. 2018).
- February 5: Lee Mishkin, American animator (Calvin and the Colonel, The New 3 Stooges, The Jackson 5ive, Halloween Is Grinch Night, Yogi's Space Race, Jetsons: The Movie, The Simpsons), storyboard artist (Linus the Lionhearted, Heavy Metal) and director (Is It Always Right to Be Right?, Bionic Six), (d. 2001).
- February 7:
  - Laurie Johnson, English composer (The Ren & Stimpy Show, SpongeBob SquarePants), (d. 2024).
  - Dušan Vukotić, Yugoslav-Croatian cartoonist and animator (Zagreb Film, Ersatz), (d. 1998).
- February 15: Harvey Korman, American actor and comedian (voice of the Great Gazoo in The Flintstones, Don Reynolds in Hey Arnold!, Arismap in the Hercules episode "Hercules and the Griffin", Efrem von Snickerdoodle in the 101 Dalmatians: The Series episode "Cupid Pup", O. Ratz in the What a Cartoon! episode "Rat in a Hot Tin Can", Gularis in the Buzz Lightyear of Star Command episode "Panic on Bathyos"), (d. 2008).
- February 19: Fred Ladd, American writer and producer (Astro Boy, Gigantor, Kimba the White Lion, creative consultant for the DiC dub of Sailor Moon), (d. 2021).
- February 25: Dick Jones, American actor (voice of the title character in Pinocchio), (d. 2014).
- February 26: Witold Giersz, Polish animator.

=== March ===
- March 1: Harry Belafonte, Jamaican-American Calypso signer (voice of The Magician in the Happily Ever After: Fairy Tales for Every Child episode "Jack and the Beanstalk", the title character in the PB&J Otter episode "The Ice Moose"), (d. 2023).
- March 3: Ib Steinaa, Danish comics artist and animator (Robinson Columbus), (d. 1987).
- March 13:
  - Zvonimir Lončarić, Croatian animator, sculptor and painter (Surogat), (d. 2004).
  - Dan Wallin, American sound engineer (The Bugs Bunny/Road Runner Movie, Anastasia, Pixar, Prep & Landing), (d. 2024).
- March 16: Dick Beals, American actor (voice of the Speedy Alka-Seltzer in Alka-Seltzer ads, N.J. Normanmeyer in The Addams Family, Reggie van Dough in Richie Rich, Birdboy in Birdman and the Galaxy Trio, Buzz Conroy in Frankenstein Jr. and The Impossibles, Baby-Faced Moonbeam in Duck Dodgers, Ralph Phillips in From A to Z-Z-Z-Z, and Boyhood Daze, Davey in Davey and Goliath), (d. 2012).
- March 18: George Plimpton, American journalist, writer, literary editor, actor and occasional amateur sportsman (voiced himself in The Simpsons episode "I'm Spelling as Fast as I Can"), (d. 2003).
- March 25: Robert Balser, American animator, producer and director (animation director on Yellow Submarine and Heavy Metal, The Triplets), (d. 2016).
- March 31: William Daniels, American actor (voice of KITT in The Simpsons episodes "The Wizard of Evergreen Terrace" and "Milhouse Doesn't Live Here Anymore", Robot Pilot in the Kim Possible episode "Ron Millionaire", the title character in The Grim Adventures of Billy & Mandy episode "Scythe 2.0").

=== April ===
- April 2:
  - Hisashi Katsuta, Japanese actor (voice of Professor Ochanomizu in Astro Boy, Dr. Hoshi in Astroganger, Professor Tobishima in Groizer X, Shin'ichirō Izumi in Tōshō Daimos), (d. 2020).
  - Ken Sansom, American actor (voice of Rabbit in the Winnie the Pooh franchise, Hound in The Transformers, Erick Hunter in The Littles, Martin Stein in The Super Powers Team: Galactic Guardians, Ralph Throgmorton in the TaleSpin episode "On a Wing and a Bear"), (d. 2012).
- April 5: Chao-Li Chi, Chinese actor (voice of Yoru in the Batman: The Animated Series episode "Night of the Ninja"), (d. 2010).
- April 10: Brumsic Brandon Jr., American comics artist and animator (worked for RCA and J.R. Bray), (d. 2014).
- April 16: Peter Mark Richman, American actor (voice of The Phantom in Defenders of the Earth, Winchell in the Batman Beyond episode "Inqueling", Abin Sur in the Superman: The Animated Series episode "In Brightest Day...", Charles Baxter in the Batman: The Animated Series episode "Riddler's Reform"), (d. 2021).
- April 23: Lew Ott, American animator (Hanna-Barbera, Hot Wheels, Fritz the Cat), character designer (Hanna-Barbera, Filmation, Marvel Productions), background artist (The Transformers: The Movie, G.I. Joe: The Movie, Hanna-Barbera) and production designer (Ruby-Spears Enterprises), (d. 2021).
- April 25: Albert Uderzo, French comics artist (creative advisor and designer for the Astérix animated films Asterix and Cleopatra and The 12 Tasks of Asterix), (d. 2020).
- April 30: Stephen Kandel, American television writer (Star Trek: The Animated Series), (d. 2023).

=== May ===
- May 4: Terry Scott, English actor (voice of Penfold in Danger Mouse), (d. 1994).
- May 5: Pat Carroll, American actress and comedian (voice of Ursula in The Little Mermaid franchise, House of Mouse, and The Wonderful World of Mickey Mouse episode "Keep on Rollin'", Morgana in The Little Mermaid II: Return to the Sea, Ms. Biddy McBrain in Galaxy High School, Hazel in Foofur, Katrina Stoneheart in Pound Puppies, Grandma in A Garfield Christmas and Garfield's Thanksgiving, Granny in My Neighbor Totoro, Bacteria in Asterix and the Big Fight, Old Female Turtle in A Turtle's Tale: Sammy's Adventures, Old Lady Crowley in Rapunzel's Tangled Adventure, Hippolyta in the Superman episode "Superman and Wonder Woman vs. the Sorceress of Time", Paula P. Casso in A Pup Named Scooby-Doo episode "Dog Gone Scooby", Koo-Koo in the Chip 'n Dale: Rescue Rangers episode "Gorilla My Dreams", additional voices in The Super 6, Yogi's Treasure Hunt and A Goofy Movie), (d. 2022).
- May 11: Bernard Fox, Welsh actor (voice of the Chairmouse in The Rescuers and The Rescuers Down Under, Henry Morton Stanley in the Time Squad episode "Out with the In Crowd"), (d. 2016).
- May 30: Clint Walker, American actor and singer (voice of Nick Nitro in Small Soldiers), (d. 2018).

=== June ===
- June 2: W. Watts Biggers, American writer (co-creator of Underdog), (d. 2013).
- June 8: Jerry Stiller, American actor and comedian (voice of Uncle Max in The Lion King 1½, Pretty Boy in Teacher's Pet, Murray Weiner in How Murray Saved Christmas, Principal Stickler in Fish Hooks), (d. 2020).
- June 15: Ottó Foky, Hungarian animator and film director, (d. 2012).
- June 20:
  - Attila Dargay, Hungarian animator, film director and comics artist (Mattie the Goose-boy, Vuk, Szaffi), (d. 2009).
  - Vyacheslav Kotyonochkin, Russian animator and comics artist (Nu, pogodi!, aka Well, Just You Wait!), (d. 2000).

=== July ===
- July 2: Brock Peters, American actor (voice of General Newcastle in Challenge of the GoBots, Tormack in Galtar and the Golden Lance, Boneyard in Gravedale High, Bloth in The Pirates of Dark Water, Lucius Fox in Batman: The Animated Series, Dark Kat in SWAT Kats: The Radical Squadron, Jomo in The Wild Thornberrys, Usula in The Legend of Tarzan, Chronos in the Johnny Bravo episode "Bearly Enough Time!", Morris Grant / Soul Power in the Static Shock episode "Blast from the Past"), (d. 2005).
- July 13: Lillian Schwartz, American artist and pioneer of computer-mediated art, (d. 2024).
- July 15: Carmen Zapata, American actress (voice of Maria Vargas in Batman: The Animated Series, Fairy #7 in the Happily Ever After: Fairy Tales for Every Child episode "Sleeping Beauty"), (d. 2014).
- July 21: Willy Moese, German comics artist and animator (Zauberlehrling, Blaff und Biene, Rolle und Robby), (d. 2007).

=== August ===
- August 14: Roger Carel, French actor (voice of Asterix and Dogmatix, French dub voice of Winnie-the-Pooh, Piglet, Rabbit, Mickey Mouse, Yogi Bear, Foghorn Leghorn, Fritz the Cat, and Flintheart Glomgold), (d. 2020).
- August 16: Constantin Mustatea, American animator (Hanna-Barbera, Filmation, The Simpsons, Widget the World Watcher, Warner Bros. Animation), (d. 1996).

=== September ===
- September 12:
  - Franco Latini, Italian actor (dub voice of Donald Duck and Tom Cat), (d. 1991).
  - Freddie Jones, English actor (voice of Dallben in The Black Cauldron), (d. 2019).
- September 13: Laura Cardoso, Brazilian actress (Brazilian dub voice of Betty Rubble in The Flintstones), (d. 2026).
- September 15: Norm Crosby, American actor and comedian (voice of Mr. Hayman in Buzz Lightyear of Star Command, the Judge in Eight Crazy Nights), (d. 2020).
- September 16:
  - Alison de Vere, English animator, background designer (worked for Halas and Batchelor, The Beatles, Yellow Submarine, The Animals of Farthing Wood) and director (The Black Dog, Psyche and Eros), (d. 2001).
  - Peter Falk, American actor (voice of Bailey in Hubert's Brain, Don Feinberg in Shark Tale), (d. 2011).
- September 19: William Hickey, American actor (voice of Dr. Finklestein in The Nightmare Before Christmas), (d. 1997).
- September 24: Arthur Malet, English actor (voice of Mr. Ages in The Secret of NIMH, King Eidilleg in The Black Cauldron, Jesaja in Felidae, Travelling Man and Major Domo in Anastasia), (d. 2013).
- September 27: Romano Scarpa, Italian comics artist, writer and animator (La piccola fiammiferaia), (d. 2005).

=== October ===
- October 1: Tom Bosley, American actor (voice of Harry Boyle in Wait Till Your Father Gets Home, B.A.H. Humbug, Esq. in The Stingiest Man in Town, the title character in The World of David the Gnome, Geppetto in Pinocchio and the Emperor of the Night, Mr. Winkle in The Tangerine Bear, Howard Cunningham in the Family Guy episode "The Father, the Son, and the Holy Fonz", Santa Claus in the Johnny Bravo episode "Twas the Night"), (d. 2010).
- October 4: Oto Reisinger, Croatian animator, illustrator, cartoonist and comics artist (Generali, vojskovodje, admirali, Tisucu devetsto devedeset prva) (d. 2016).
- October 7: Giorgio Bordini, Italian comics artist, animator and illustrator (worked on La Piccola Fiammiferaia), (d. 1999).
- October 13: Vladmir Delac, Yugoslavian comics artist and animator (Veliki Miting), (d. 1968).
- October 17: Wolf Koenig, Canadian film director and animator (worked for Colin Low), (d. 2014).
- October 18: George C. Scott, American actor (voice of Smoke in Cartoon All-Stars to the Rescue, Percival McLeach in The Rescuers Down Under), (d. 1999).
- October 20: Joyce Brothers, American psychologist, television personality, advice columnist and writer (voiced herself in The Simpsons episode "Last Exit to Springfield" and the Pinky and the Brain episode "The Pinky and the Brain Reunion Special"), (d. 2013).
- October 23: Mizuho Suzuki, Japanese actor (voice of Doctor Onishi in Akira, Japanese dub voice of the Narrator in Beauty and the Beast and Unicron in The Transformers: The Movie), (d. 2023).

=== November ===
- November 7: John Coates, English film producer (Yellow Submarine, The Snowman), (d. 2012).
- November 26: Ernie Coombs, American-Canadian entertainer (voice of the Narrator in Simon in the Land of Chalk Drawings), (d. 2001).
- November 27: Dean Spille, American animator, layout artist and background artist (Peanuts, Frosty Returns, Bucky O'Hare and the Toad Wars, Garfield and Friends), (d. 2021).
- November 30: Robert Guillaume, American actor and singer (voice of Rafiki in The Lion King franchise, Detective Catfish in Fish Police, the Narrator in Happily Ever After: Fairy Tales for Every Child, Mr. Thicknose in The Land Before Time VIII: The Big Freeze, Ben in The Adventures of Tom Thumb and Thumbelina, Mr. Corblarb in The Addams Family episode "Color Me Addams", Dr. Parker in The Proud Family episode "Behind Family Lines"), (d. 2017).

=== December ===
- December 5: Shirley Silvey, American animator (worked for Upa, Jay Ward), (d. 2010).
- December 9: Alan Zaslove, American animator and animation producer (UPA, Hanna-Barbera, Walt Disney Animation), (d. 2019).
- December 26: János Kass, Hungarian animator, illustrator, graphic designer and film director (Dilemma), (d. 2010).

=== Specific date unknown ===
- Jane Conger Belson Shimane, American experimental filmmaker (d. 2002).
