= April Maze =

1930 film

- Directed by: Otto Messmer
- Written by: Pat Sullivan
- Produced by: Pat Sullivan
- Starring: Harry Edison
- Production companies: Pat Sullivan Cartoon Studio; Copley Studios
- Distributed by: Copley Studios
- Release date: 1930
- Running time: 7 minutes
- Country: United States
- Language: English

April Maze is a 1930 short animated cartoon featuring Felix the Cat, directed by Otto Messmer and produced by Pat Sullivan.

== Plot ==
Felix brings his nephews Inky and Winky to the park for a picnic, but they always seem to be delayed. While they say their grace, a rabbit gets a snake to steal their meal. When they try to get it back, it rains so they must go back home. The rain stops and the three continue to the picnic. It rains again for a short while, but then it gets better. They say their grace again before eating, and someone else steals their meal. Felix runs after the culprit but he can not catch him. At the end of the story, a stork comes with a picnic basket. Hoping the stork has found his meal, Felix opens the basket with joy, but he finds out it is just more kittens who jump about as the cartoon ends.

== Inky and Winky ==
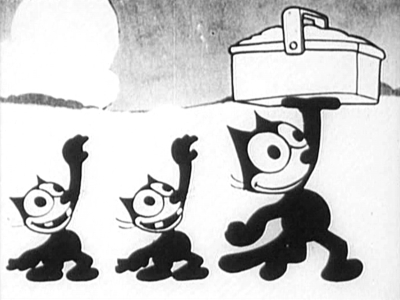
Felix and his nephews Inky and Winky Cat in April Maze

Inky and Winky make their most famous theatrical appearance in this short, which is occasionally mistaken for their only appearance. They actually debuted in Felix the Cat Weathers the Weather (1926), returning in several more 1920s shorts before April Maze. Sometimes three kittens were used, in which case the third was called Dinky. In Eskimotive (1928), Inky appeared solo.

In the 1950s, two nephews appeared with Felix in their own comic books. There Inky and Dinky were used. The most common pairing of Inky and Winky began several years later.

Although Felix's nephews do not appear in the early-1960s and mid-1990s TV series, they have a considerable role in the online comics, making them among the principal characters in the Felix media.

== Reception ==
As animation historian John Canemaker, in his book Felix: The Twisted Tale of the World's Most Famous Cat criticised the short, writing:

April Maze, exemplifies the creative dilemma placed on Messmer, who attempted to make sound films that could compete with Disney but was saddled with the postsync method. The film's opening scene resembles a Silly Symphony as a butterfly (animated with large floppy wings) bounces interminably from flower to flower. Next, the flowers dance in a repeated cycle before their petals form hands and they applaud themselves. This 'overture' seems to say, 'Look, I'm a sound cartoon just like Disney'; unfortunately it also calls attention to the on-again, off-again synchronization, and worse, it delays the appearance of Felix... In April Maze, a now thoroughly domesticated Felix, seems to have lost his edge. In the role as a good daddy, he is boring, lacks zest and his old magical resourcefulness; metamorphosis is used sparingly without the pleasing surprises of years past. Supporting characters (a rabbit, snake, bear, and stork) dominate the screen footage; the film meanders and has lost and exhausted quality to it.

== See also ==
- Felix the Cat filmography
