= Felix the Cat filmography =

Appearances of the first cartoon cat

This is a complete list of animated films released theatrically starring Felix the Cat.

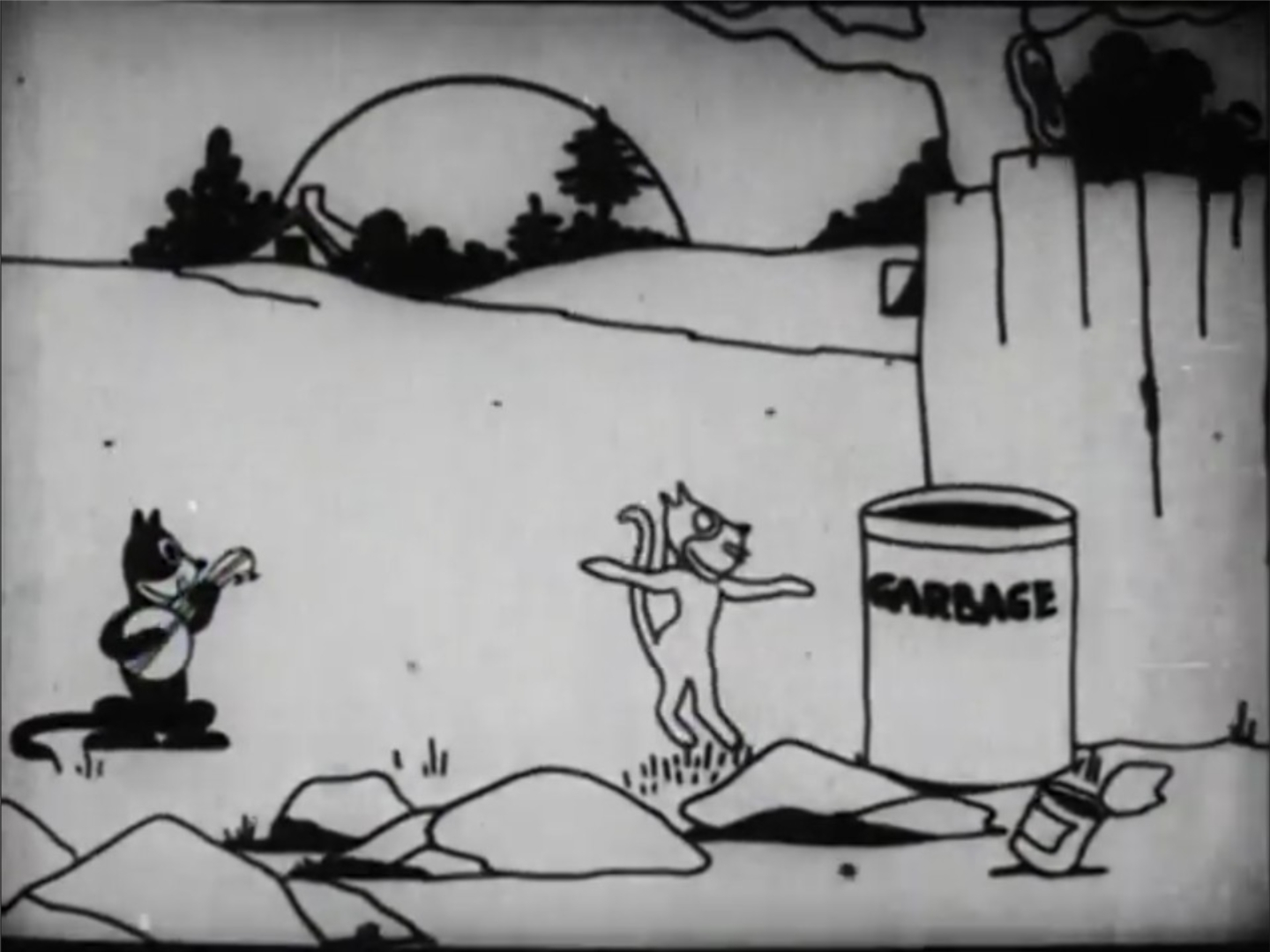
Felix (then known as Master Tom) in his first screen appearance Feline Follies (1919).

All Felix the Cat short films listed here are in the public domain.

== Short films ==
=== Silent films ===
==== Paramount Pictures (1919–1921) ====
The first 25 Felix cartoons were distributed to theaters by Paramount Pictures. The character was named "Master Tom" until the third cartoon, The Adventures of Felix.

===== 1919 =====
No.	Title	Director	Release Date	Film
1	Feline Follies	Otto Messmer	November 9, 1919	
2	The Musical Mews	Otto Messmer	November 16, 1919	Lost film
3	The Adventures of Felix	Otto Messmer	December 14, 1919	Lost film

===== 1920 =====
No.	Title	Director	Release Date	Film
4	A Frolic with Felix	Otto Messmer	January 25, 1920	Excerpt
5	Felix the Big Game Hunter	Otto Messmer	February 22, 1920	Lost film
6	Wrecking a Romeo	Otto Messmer	March 7, 1920	Lost film
7	Felix the Food Controller	Otto Messmer	April 11, 1920	Lost film
8	Felix the Pinch Hitter	Otto Messmer	April 18, 1920	Lost film
9	Foxy Felix	Otto Messmer	May 16, 1920	Lost film
10	A Hungry Hoodoo	Otto Messmer	June 6, 1920	Lost film
11	The Great Cheese Robbery	Otto Messmer	June 13, 1920	Lost film
12	Felix and the Feed Bag	Otto Messmer	July 18, 1920	Lost film
13	Nifty Nurse	Otto Messmer	August 22, 1920	Lost film
14	The Circus	Otto Messmer	September 26, 1920	Retitled Frolics at the Circus
15	My Hero	Otto Messmer	October 24, 1920	Lost film
16	Felix the Landlord	Otto Messmer	November 21, 1920	Lost film
17	Felix's Fish Story	Otto Messmer	December 26, 1920	Lost film

===== 1921 =====
No.	Title	Director	Release Date	Film
18	Felix the Gay Dog	Otto Messmer	February 6, 1921	Lost film
19	Down on the Farm	Otto Messmer	February 13, 1921	Lost film
20	Felix the Hypnotist	Otto Messmer	March 20, 1921	Lost film
21	Free Lunch	Otto Messmer	April 17, 1921	Lost film
22	Felix Goes on Strike	Otto Messmer	May 15, 1921	A copy is known to exist
23	Felix Out of Luck	Otto Messmer	June 5, 1921	Lost film
24	The Love Punch	Otto Messmer	July 3, 1921	Lost film
25	Felix Left at Home	Otto Messmer	July 17, 1921	Lost film

==== Margaret J. Winkler (1922–1925) ====
After the cancelation of Paramount Magazine, Pat went to Margaret J. Winkler's Winkler Pictures, who would produce the next season of Felix shorts under her name.

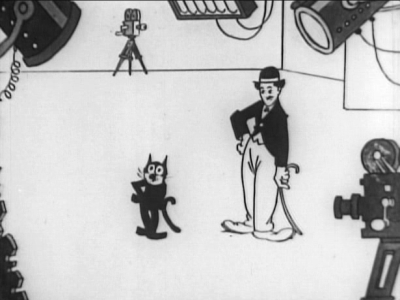
Felix and Charlie Chaplin share the screen in a memorable moment from Felix in Hollywood (1923).

64 Winkler cartoons were made between 1922—1925.

===== 1922 =====
No.	Title	Director	Release Date	Film
26	Felix Saves the Day	Otto Messmer	February 1, 1922	
27	Felix at the Fair	Otto Messmer	March 1, 1922	
28	Felix Makes Good (also known as Felix Has a Narrow Escape)	Otto Messmer	April 1, 1922	
29	Felix All at Sea	Otto Messmer	May 1, 1922	
30	Felix in Love	Otto Messmer	June 1, 1922	
31	Felix in the Swim	Otto Messmer	July 1, 1922	
32	Felix Finds a Way (also known as Felix on the War Path)	Otto Messmer	August 1, 1922	
33	Felix Gets Revenge	Otto Messmer	September 1, 1922	
34	Felix Wakes Up	Otto Messmer	September 15, 1922	
35	Felix Minds the Kid	Otto Messmer	October 1, 1922	
36	Felix Turns the Tide	Otto Messmer	October 15, 1922	reissue titled The Inventor
37	Fifty-Fifty	Otto Messmer	October 21, 1922	
38	Felix Comes Back	Otto Messmer	1922	
39	Felix on the Trail	Otto Messmer	November 1, 1922	
40	Felix Lends a Hand	Otto Messmer	November 15, 1922	
41	Felix Gets Left	Otto Messmer	December 1, 1922	Excerpt
42	Felix in the Bone Age (also known as Felix in the Stone Age or The Stone Age)	Otto Messmer	December 15, 1922	reissue titled The Stone Age

===== 1923 =====
No.	Title	Director	Release Date	Film
43	Felix the Ghost Breaker	Otto Messmer	January 1, 1923	
44	Felix Win's Out	Otto Messmer	January 15, 1923	
45	Felix Tries for Treasure	Otto Messmer	April 15, 1923	
46	Felix Revolts	Otto Messmer	May 1, 1923	
47	Felix Calms His Conscience	Otto Messmer	May 15, 1923	
48	Felix the Globe Trotter	Otto Messmer	June 1, 1923	
49	Felix Gets Broadcasted	Otto Messmer	June 15, 1923	
50	Felix Strikes it Rich	Otto Messmer	July 1, 1923	
51	Felix in Hollywood	Otto Messmer	July 15, 1923	
52	Felix in Fairyland	Otto Messmer	August 1, 1923	
53	Felix Laughs Last	Otto Messmer	August 15, 1923	
54	Felix and the Radio	Otto Messmer	1923	Lost film
55	Felix Fills a Shortage	Otto Messmer	November 15, 1923	
56	Felix the Goat-Getter	Otto Messmer	December 1, 1923	
57	Felix Goes A-Hunting	Otto Messmer	December 15, 1923	

===== 1924 =====
No.	Title	Director	Release Date	Film	Notes
58	Felix Out of Luck	Otto Messmer	January 1, 1924		
59	Felix Loses Out	Otto Messmer	January 15, 1924		
60	Felix 'Hyps' the Hippo	Otto Messmer	February 1, 1924		
61	Felix Crosses the Crooks	Otto Messmer	February 15, 1924	Home film version retitled "Felix Nabs a Nabber"	
62	Felix Tries to Rest	Otto Messmer	February 29, 1924		
63	Felix Doubles for Darwin	Otto Messmer	March 15, 1924		First appearance of the rounder Felix design by Bill Nolan.
64	Felix Finds Out	Otto Messmer	April 1, 1924		
65	Felix Cashes In	Otto Messmer	1924	Lost film	
66	Felix Fairy Tales	Otto Messmer	1924	Lost film	
67	Felix Pinches the Pole	Otto Messmer	May 1, 1924		
68	Felix Puts it Over	Otto Messmer	May 15, 1924		
69	A Friend in Need	Otto Messmer	June 1, 1924		
70	Felix Finds 'Em Fickle	Otto Messmer	June 15, 1924	Excerpt	
71	Felix Baffled by Banjos	Otto Messmer	June 15, 1924	Lost film	
72	Felix All Balled Up	Otto Messmer	July 1, 1924		
73	Felix Brings Home the Bacon	Otto Messmer	July 15, 1924		
74	Felix Goes West	Otto Messmer	August 1, 1924		
75	Felix Minds His Business	Otto Messmer	1924		
76	Felix Grabs His Grub	Otto Messmer	September 1924		
77	Felix Goes Hungry	Otto Messmer	December 1, 1924		
78	Felix Finishes First	Otto Messmer	December 15, 1924	Lost film	

===== 1925 =====
No.	Title	Director	Release Date	Film	Notes
79	Felix Wins and Loses	Otto Messmer	January 1, 1925		
80	Felix All Puzzled	Otto Messmer	January 15, 1925		
81	Felix Follows the Swallows	Otto Messmer	February 1, 1925		
82	Felix Rests in Peace	Otto Messmer	February 15, 1925	Lost film	
83	Felix Gets His Fill	Otto Messmer	March 1, 1925		
84	Felix Full O' Fight	Otto Messmer	April 13, 1925		
85	Felix Outwits Cupid	Otto Messmer	April 27, 1925	Lost film	
86	Monkeys with Magic	Otto Messmer	May 8, 1925		
87	Felix Cops the Prize	Otto Messmer	May 25, 1925		
88	Felix Gets the Can	Otto Messmer	June 8, 1925		
89	Felix Dopes it Out	Otto Messmer	August 15, 1925		Last Felix short by Winkler.

==== General Electric (1925) ====
This ten-minute cartoon was created to promote Mazda light bulbs from General Electric. As an advertisement, it is not part of the main series.

Title	Director	Release Date	Film
The Cat and the Kit	Otto Messmer	June 18, 1925	

==== Educational Pictures (1925–1928) ====
After fighting over who owned the Felix character, Pat left Winkler and took Felix with him. For the 1925-1928 season, Pat would make Felix cartoons under Educational Pictures.

78 cartoons were made by Educational between 1925 — 1928.

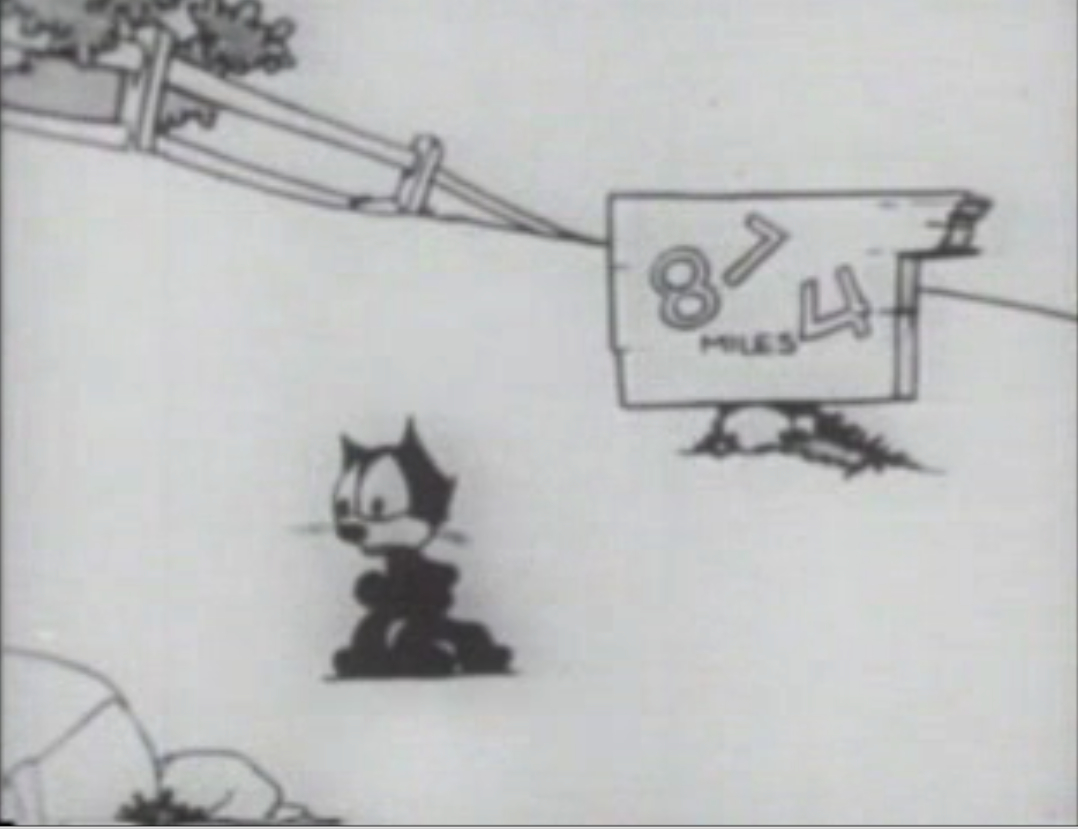
From The Non-Stop Fright (1927).

===== 1925 =====
No.	Title	Director	Release Date	Film
90	Felix Trifles with Time	Otto Messmer	August 23, 1925	
91	Felix Busts into Business	Otto Messmer	September 6, 1925	Lost film
92	Felix Trips Thru Toyland	Otto Messmer	September 20, 1925	
93	Felix on the Farm	Otto Messmer	October 4, 1925	Lost film
94	Felix on the Job	Otto Messmer	October 18, 1925	
95	Felix in the Cold Rush	Otto Messmer	November 1, 1925	
96	Eats are West	Otto Messmer	November 15, 1925	
97	Felix Tries the Trades	Otto Messmer	November 29, 1925	Lost film
98	Felix at the Rainbow's End	Otto Messmer	December 13, 1925	Lost film
99	Felix the Cat Kept on Walking	Otto Messmer	December 27, 1925	

===== 1926 =====
No.	Title	Director	Release Date	Film	Notes
100	Felix Spots the Spook	Otto Messmer	January 10, 1926		
101	Felix Flirts with Fate	Otto Messmer	January 24, 1926		
102	Felix in Blunderland	Otto Messmer	February 7, 1926		
103	Felix Fans the Flames	Otto Messmer	February 21, 1926	Lost film	
104	Felix Laughs it Off	Otto Messmer	March 7, 1926		
105	Felix Weathers the Weather	Otto Messmer	March 21, 1926		First appearance of Felix's nephews Inky and Winky.
106	Felix Uses His Head	Otto Messmer	April 4, 1926		
107	Felix Misses the Cue	Otto Messmer	April 18, 1926	Lost film	
108	Felix Braves the Briny	Otto Messmer	May 2, 1926		Original black-and-white version is lost.
109	A Tale of Two Kitties	Otto Messmer	May 16, 1926	Lost film	
110	Felix Scoots Through Scotland	Otto Messmer	May 30, 1926		
111	Felix Rings the Ringer	Otto Messmer	June 13, 1926		
112	School Daze	Otto Messmer	June 27, 1926	Lost film	
113	Felix Seeks Solitude	Otto Messmer	July 11, 1926		
114	Felix Misses His Swiss	Otto Messmer	July 25, 1926		Original black-and-white version is lost.
115	Gym Gems	Otto Messmer	August 8, 1926		
116	Two-Lip Time	Otto Messmer	August 22, 1926		
117	Scrambled Yeggs	Otto Messmer	September 5, 1926		
118	Felix Shatters the Sheik	Otto Messmer	September 19, 1926		
119	Felix Hunts the Hunter	Otto Messmer	October 3, 1926		
120	Land O' Fancy	Otto Messmer	October 17, 1926		
121	Felix Busts a Bubble	Otto Messmer	October 31, 1926		
122	Reverse English	Otto Messmer	November 14, 1926	Lost film	
123	Felix Trumps the Ace	Otto Messmer	November 28, 1926		
124	Felix Collars the Button	Otto Messmer	December 12, 1926	Lost film	
125	Zoo Logic	Otto Messmer	December 29, 1926	Lost film	

===== 1927 =====
No.	Title	Director	Release Date	Film	Notes
126	Felix Dines and Pines	Otto Messmer	January 9, 1927		
127	Pedigreedy	Otto Messmer	January 23, 1927		
128	Icy Eyes	Otto Messmer	February 6, 1927		
129	Stars in Stripes	Otto Messmer	February 20, 1927		
130	Felix Sees 'Em in Season	Otto Messmer	March 6, 1927		
131	Barn Yarns	Otto Messmer	March 20, 1927		
132	Germ Mania	Otto Messmer	April 3, 1927		
133	Sax Appeal	Otto Messmer	April 27, 1927	Lost film	
134	Eye Jinks	Otto Messmer	May 1, 1927		
135	Felix the Cat as Roameo	Otto Messmer	May 15, 1927		Not to be confused with Romeeow
136	Felix Ducks His Duty	Otto Messmer	May 29, 1927		
137	Dough-Nutty	Otto Messmer	June 12, 1927	Lost film	
138	"Loco"Motive	Otto Messmer	June 26, 1927		
139	Art for Heart's Sake	Otto Messmer	July 10, 1927	Lost film	
140	The Travel-Hog	Otto Messmer	July 14, 1927		
141	Jack From All Trades	Otto Messmer	August 7, 1927		Original black-and-white version is lost.
142	The Non-Stop Fright	Otto Messmer	August 21, 1927		
143	Wise Guise	Otto Messmer	September 4, 1927		
144	Flim Flam Films	Otto Messmer	September 18, 1927		
145	Felix Switches Witches (a.k.a. Felix Snitches Witches)	Otto Messmer	October 2, 1927		
146	No Fuelin'	Otto Messmer	October 16, 1927		
147	Daze and Knights	Otto Messmer	October 20, 1927		
148	Uncle Tom's Crabbin'	Otto Messmer	November 13, 1927		
149	Whys and Other Whys	Otto Messmer	November 27, 1927		
150	Felix Hits the Deck	Otto Messmer	December 11, 1927		
151	Felix Behind in Front	Otto Messmer	December 25, 1927		

===== 1928 =====
No.	Title	Director	Release Date	Film	Notes
152	The Smoke Scream	Otto Messmer	January 8, 1928		
153	Draggin' the Dragon	Otto Messmer	January 22, 1928		
154	The Oily Bird	Otto Messmer	February 5, 1928		
155	Ohm Sweet Ohm	Otto Messmer	February 19, 1928	Lost film	
156	Japanicky	Otto Messmer	March 4, 1928		
157	Polly-tics	Otto Messmer	March 18, 1928		
158	Comicalamities	Otto Messmer	April 1, 1928		
159	Sure-Locked Homes	Otto Messmer	April 15, 1928		
160	Eskimotive	Otto Messmer	April 19, 1928		
161	Arabiantics	Otto Messmer	May 13, 1928		
162	In- and Out-Laws	Otto Messmer	May 27, 1928		
163	Outdoor Indore	Otto Messmer	June 10, 1928		
164	Futuritzy	Otto Messmer	June 24, 1928		
165	Astronomeows (a.k.a. Astronomeous)	Otto Messmer	July 8, 1928		
166	Jungle Bungles	Otto Messmer	July 22, 1928		
167	The Last Life	Otto Messmer	August 5, 1928	Lost film	Last Felix by Educational Pictures.

With the introduction of sound, Educational Pictures told Pat that they should add sound to the next season of Felix cartoons. Pat refused though, saying that sound would "ruin" the Felix cartoons. Leaving Educational Pictures in total.

==== First National Pictures (1928–1929) ====
It is unknown if new Felix cartoons were produced during this period or if First National (a sister company of Warner Bros.) only redistributed earlier Felix cartoons.

=== Sound films ===
==== Copley Pictures (1929–1930) ====
Copley Pictures was the first distributor to issue Felix cartoons with sound. There were twelve originally with sound, and an unknown number of reissues of silent films with sound.

===== Sound reissues =====
A number of silent Felix cartoons were also re-issued by Copley at this time, with their intertitles removed and sound added. Newer simple titles were also inserted in most reissues and the lines of the characters were cut, which removed signs of Educational Pictures copyrights. Jacques Kopfstein was hired by Pat Sullivan to add sound to the film, a practice common in the end of the silent film era, with films that received such treatment known to some as "goat glands". All Felix shorts that were re-issued in sound have post-synchronized soundtracks (the soundtrack was made to match the already-existing film). As a result, the synchronization is not perfect, and there is occasionally an audible delay between the action and the sound effect.

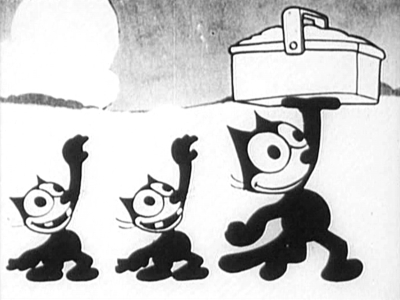
Felix, Inky, and Winky in April Maze (1930)

Title	Director	Film
Arabiantics	Otto Messmer	
Outdoor Indore	Otto Messmer	
The Oily Bird	Otto Messmer	
Behind in Front	Otto Messmer	
The Non-Stop Fright	Otto Messmer	
Daze and Knights	Otto Messmer	
Eskimotive	Otto Messmer	
Astronomeous (Astronomeows)	Otto Messmer	
Futuritzy	Otto Messmer	
In and Out Laws (In- and Out-Laws)	Otto Messmer	
Uncle Tom's Crabbin	Otto Messmer	
Switches Witches (Felix Switches Witches)	Otto Messmer	
No Fuelin	Otto Messmer	
The Smoke Scream	Otto Messmer	
Japanicky	Otto Messmer	

===== New releases =====
Copley also distributed twelve new cartoons originally produced with sound.

====== 1929 ======
No.	Title	Director	Original release date	Film	Notes
168	False Vases	Otto Messmer	October 12, 1929		First Felix short film from Copley Pictures.
169	One Good Turn	Otto Messmer	October 26, 1929		
170	Romeeow	Otto Messmer	November 9, 1929		Not to be confused with Felix as Roameo.
171	The Cat's Meow	Otto Messmer	December 7, 1929		Lost film.

====== 1930 ======
No.	Title	Director	Original release date	Film	Notes
172	April Maze		April 5, 1930		Last animated appearance of Felix's nephews Inky and Winky.
173	Woos Whoopee		April 19, 1930		
174	Forty Winks		May 17, 1930		
175	Hootchy Kootchy Parlais Vous		May 31, 1930	Home film excerpt retitled Cat and Mouse: The Battle	Last Animated Appearance of Kitty Kat until Baby Felix.
176	Oceantics		June 14, 1930		
177	Skulls and Sculls		July 12, 1930		
178	Tee Time		August 9, 1930		Last Animated Appearance of Skiddoo the Mouse until The Twisted Tales of Felix the Cat
179	unknown title		1930 or 1931		Unidentified title. Lost film. Last Felix short film from Copley Pictures and last Felix short filmed in black and white.

==== Van Beuren Studios (1936) ====
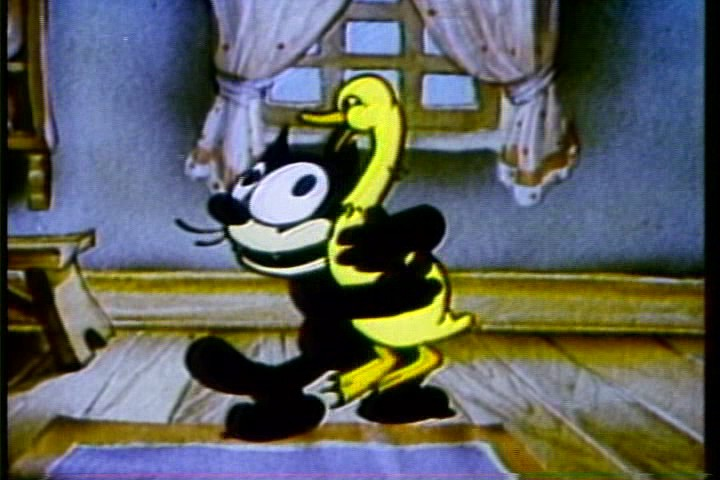
Felix in the Van Beuren Cartoon The Goose That Laid the Golden Egg (1936)

Felix in the Van Beuren Cartoon Neptune Nonsense (1936)

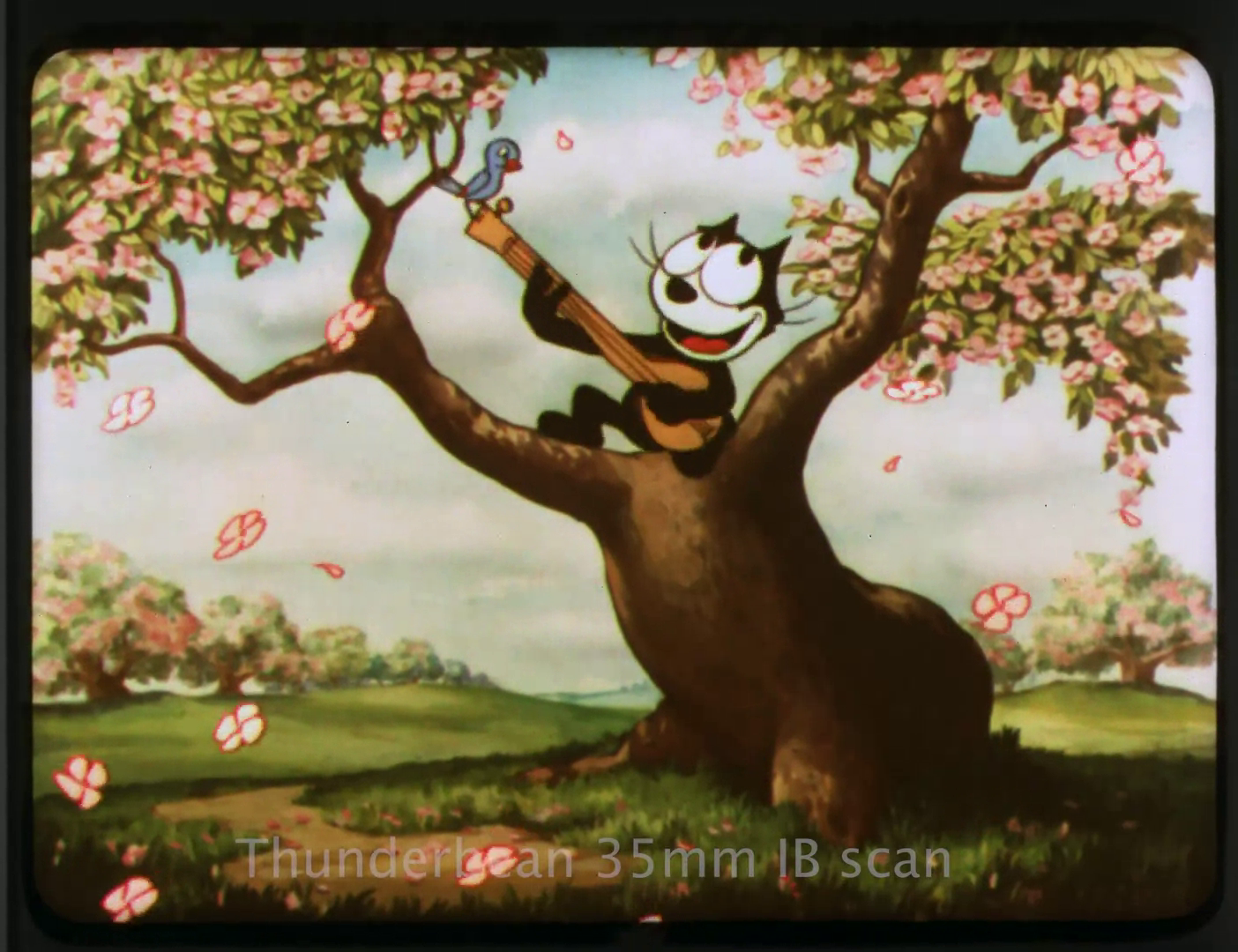
Felix in the Van Beuren Cartoon Bold King Cole (1936)

This short revival of Felix (as a more childlike character, similar to his later 1958 incarnation) was produced by Van Beuren Studios as part of the Rainbow Parade series and distributed to theaters by RKO Radio Pictures. All of these cartoons were the first to be produced in three-strip Technicolor.

No.	Title	Director	Original release date	Film
180	The Goose That Laid the Golden Egg	Burt Gillett Tom Palmer	February 7, 1936	
181	Neptune Nonsense	Burt Gillett Tom Palmer	March 20, 1936	
182	Bold King Cole	Burt Gillett	May 29, 1936	

== Television ==
The Magic Bag - first episode of Felix the Cat - TV series

#	Title	First air date	Last air date	Season(s)	Episodes	Network
1	Felix the Cat	October 2, 1958	May 13, 1960	2	130	Syndication
2	Felix the Cat Live	June 7, 1975	October 23, 1977	1	29	CBS
3	The Twisted Tales of Felix the Cat	September 16, 1995	April 12, 1997	2	21	CBS
4	Baby Felix	October 8, 2000	June 29, 2001	1	65	NHK

== Feature-length films ==
More than five decades following the last theatrical shorts, a Felix feature film was produced. Although originally intended to be released theatrically, it was released as a direct-to-video feature instead.

=== Felix the Cat Saves Christmas (2004) ===
A direct-to-video release. In Felix the Cat Saves Christmas, Felix along with his magic bag of tricks must stop the Professor and Rock Bottom from ruining Christmas. The Professor plans to use his diabolical snow-making machine to create the biggest blizzard the world has ever seen. If his scheme works, Christmas will be canceled for sure. Felix heroically sets off for the North Pole to help Santa, but Felix will need every trick in his magic bag. This is to date, the final Felix the Cat production.

== Sources ==
- Gerstein, David A. (2007). "The Classic Felix Filmography". The Classic Felix the Cat Page. Archived from the original on April 12, 2016.
- Canemaker, John (1996). Felix: The Twisted Tale of the World's Most Famous Cat. Da Capo Press. ISBN 0-306-80731-9.
