= Felix the Cat Trifles with Time =

1925 film

- Directed by: Otto Messmer
- Produced by: E. W. Hammons
- Animation by: Otto Messmer; Hal Walker; Burt Gillett; Dana Parker; Jack Bogle
- Color process: Black and white
- Production company: Pat Sullivan Studios
- Distributed by: Bijou Films, Inc. Educational Pictures
- Release date: August 23, 1925
- Running time: 7:51
- Country: United States
- Language: English

Felix the Cat Trifles with Time (also referred to as Felix Trifles with Time) is a 1925 American animated, black and white, silent short film by Pat Sullivan Studios, featuring Felix the Cat. Produced by E. W. Hammons, it featured the work of the animator Otto Messmer, Hal Walker, Burton Gillett, Dana Parker, and Jack Bogle. It was the first cartoon of the series to be distributed by Educational Pictures.

== Plot ==
Felix is a hungry cat in the city, looking for food remnants in a trash bin. Finding nothing inside, he heads toward a nearby apartment building. To his amazement, he finds roast chicken hanging next to an upper window. To reach it, he sneaks into a musician's tuba which then propels him upward. Felix gets his hands on the meat, only to have himself grabbed and thrown back down by a resident.

Felix is walking in an open field, still wondering how to obtain some food. Suddenly spotting Father Time standing by, Felix asks the old time master to put him in a period that may do well for him, just for a day. Father Time at first declines, but agrees when Felix offers a silver dollar. The time wizard brings out a wand and grants Felix his wish.

Father Time sends him into prehistory, where cavemen and dinosaurs were common. Looking for something to eat, Felix picks up a large bone, only to be chased by a giant lizard.

After outrunning another dinosaur, Felix finds himself in front of a pre-historic tailor shop. Inside the shop, a caveman is looking for a suitable garment but appears uninterested in the few clothes the tailor shows him. The tailor steps outside and notices Felix. Finding the cat's pelt as a good material, the tailor lures him into the shop, where a frenzy happens. The caveman then emerges wearing a black garment with a long tail on it, and Felix shows up almost entirely bones from foot to neck. The caveman removes the outfit to go for a swim in the lake. Felix uses this opportunity to get back his pelt. He continues wandering until he comes across a mastodon.

Father Time has been napping on the ground until his alarm clock rings. He wakes and finds it is time to return Felix to the present. Felix is still having trouble with the mastodon but the time wizard's magic finally takes effect and Felix is at last sent back to his own period. Though he has to return to searching trash cans again, he figures it is better than his experience of the pre-historic era.

== Production ==
After their contracts with MJ Winkler Productions concluded, the animation staff made the transit to Educational Pictures. This new company would become the series' largest distributor.

== Sound track ==
Music in the soundtrack include Tears by King Oliver's Creole Jazz Band, and Buddy's Habit by The Bucktown Five.

== See also ==
- Felix the Cat filmography
