= Wink =

Expressive body movement involving the blink of an eye

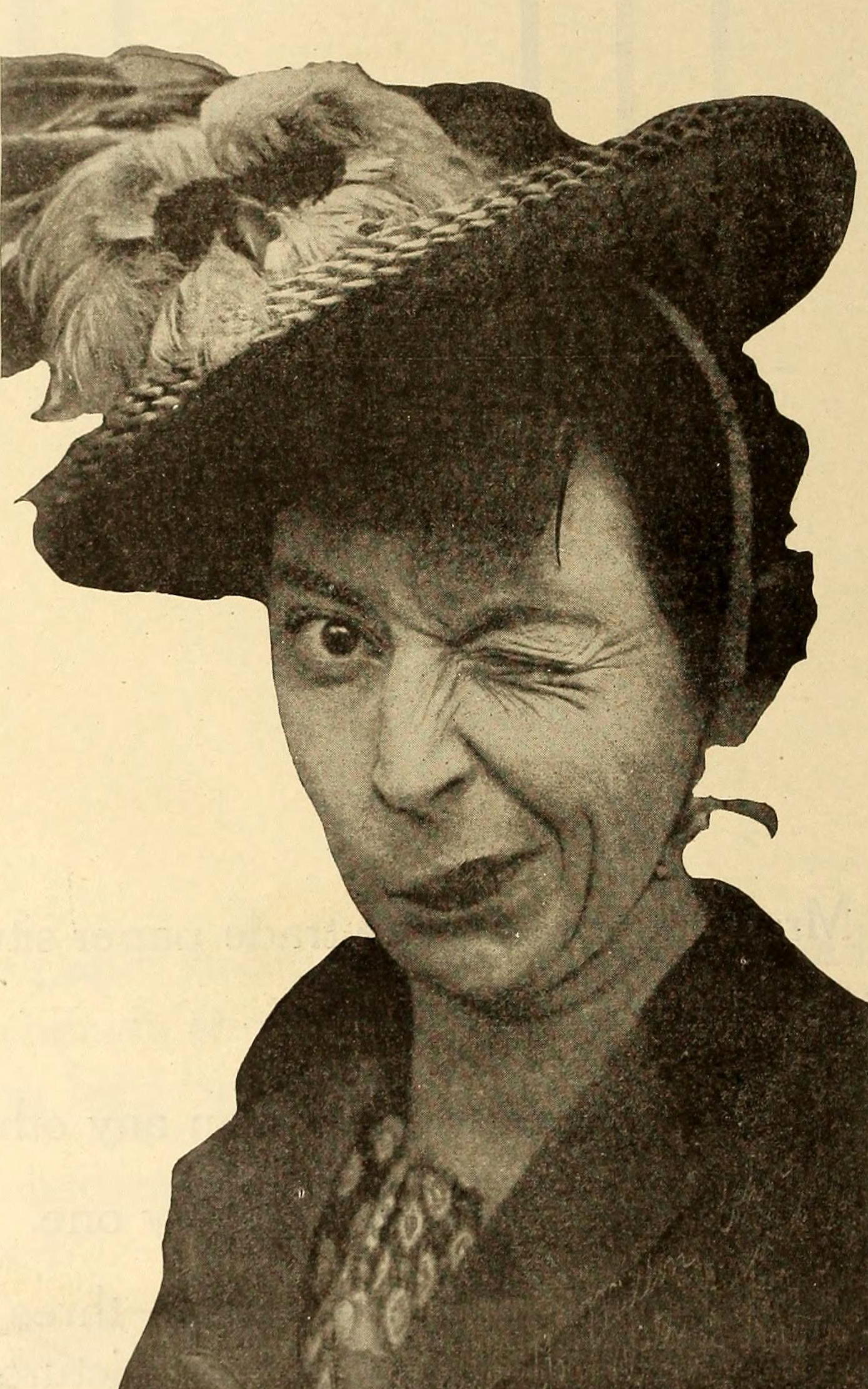
Gale Henry winking, 1919

A wink is a facial expression made by briefly closing one eye. A wink is an informal mode of non-verbal communication usually signaling shared hidden knowledge or intent. However, it is ambiguous by itself and highly dependent upon additional context, without which a wink could become misinterpreted or even nonsensical. For example, in some regions of the world, a wink may be considered rude or offensive. Depending on the relationship of the people involved, a wink could possibly constitute a sexual gesture.

== General overview and meanings ==
Winking is one of the more subtle gestures, usually involving eye contact between those involved. In most cases it is only meant to be known by the sender and their intended receivers, but in some cases can be more widely intended.

=== Single wink ===
A single wink is usually a friendly gesture implying a degree of solidarity or intimacy.

A typical use of the wink is to quietly send a message that third parties are not aware of. For example, while person A is lying to person B or deliberately teasing them, they might wink at person C as a means of indicating the fact to C and incorporating them in the "conspiracy". Alternatively, if person A is joking or teasing person B in a friendly way, person A may wink directly at person B as a way to suggest to them that their own (A's) words are to be taken as a joke. It is also possible for person A to use winking in order to secretly imply to person B that the words or actions of some third party should not be taken seriously (for example, because the third party is joking or lying).

A wink could also be used as a somewhat humorous way to express sympathy, solidarity, and encouragement, especially when the winker is trying to put the receiver at ease in a situation where they might feel nervous or uncomfortable. In such cases a wink has a meaning very similar to that of a "thumbs up".

In some cultures it is often a sexual interest, or flirtatious manner, during momentary eye contact. This is often followed by a smile and usually a smile from the receiver if it is accepted or approved by them, sometimes combined with blushing if they are embarrassed. A smile from the receiver sometimes—but not always—indicates (sexual) interest in the winker. For example, in the Wodaabe tribe in the Niger area, someone who wants to engage in sexual activities can wink at a person. If the person continues to look at them, they will slightly move their lip corner, showing the way to the bush the person is expected to have sex with them in.

In particularly difficult or strenuous situations, Person A may wink at Person B to non-verbally communicate that Person B can trust Person C. An extreme example of this could be undercover cops when one does something otherwise questionable.

=== Double wink ===
Like a single wink but more emphatic, two winks in a row may be used by the sender as a subtle way to imply that something said by the sender, immediately beforehand, was "sneaky", "tricky", "misleading", or "untrue" to the receiver. In English-speaking countries, this has also given rise to the expression of vocally saying "wink wink" while winking—or sometimes while not even winking at all, in which case the sender is not communicating the "trickiness" of their words to a third party, but to the receiver, and is thus signalling that their words should not be taken literally but as a hint or euphemism.

== Cultural specific differences ==
=== The Western world (including Eastern Europe and Latin America) ===
An avatar from Second Life winking

Winking in Western culture can be used as a way of letting someone else know that the winker or some other person is joking or lying (e.g., a parent tells their child a story about a fairy princess, and then winks at the child's older sibling, the sibling thus knows the parent is lying to the younger child). It may also be used to communicate sexual intentions, ranging from flirtation to an explicit invitation.

=== Asia ===
In China and reportedly to some extent in India, winking to anyone other than family or a friend who a person wishes to have sex with may be seen as an offensive or at least an impolite gesture. This is demonstrated in the commotion caused by Sarah Palin in a number of Asian countries during the 2008 vice presidential debate, where she winked several times while debating Joe Biden. When Frederick Spencer Chapman was training Chinese guerillas in Malaya to shoot rifles, he wrote that "about one man in three" was unable to close only the left eye.

However, winking in the Indian subcontinent often has similar connotations as in the West. It can be used to signal an "inside" joke, a sly gesture shared between two people privately, unbeknownst to those around them, as in a social gathering. It can also be a naughty "come on" towards the attractive sex.

=== Africa ===
West African parents may wink to signal children to leave the room, especially when there is a guest, or another adult coming in. It is considered rude for children to stay in a room where adults or elders want to have a conversation, and so winking is used as a more discreet way to tell the children to leave the room. Parents also try not to embarrass themselves in front of guests, because their children do not understand immediately when it is time to leave the room.

== Noted examples ==
- In the famous Monty Python sketch "Nudge Nudge", a younger man slyly asks an older gentleman about sex through innuendo, reiterating the phrase "nudge nudge wink wink" after his questions in an attempt to indicate that his innocent-sounding questions are intended to be double entendres, i.e., of a sexual nature.
- During the 2008 United States vice-presidential debate, Republican candidate Sarah Palin winked at the audience several times. Her behaviour was considered to be highly unusual in the context of a formal political debate and received considerable media attention. While some conservative pundits defended Palin, other individuals were critical of and even offended by her conduct.
- In online dating, a "wink" is a way of communicating approval of another member (sometimes from a non-member) without sending email. It is used at sites such as Match.com.

== Physiological aspects ==
Not all humans are able to wink voluntarily, and some can only wink one (usually the non-dominant) eye. Others are far better at winking one eye and find it awkward to wink the other.

== Animal winks ==
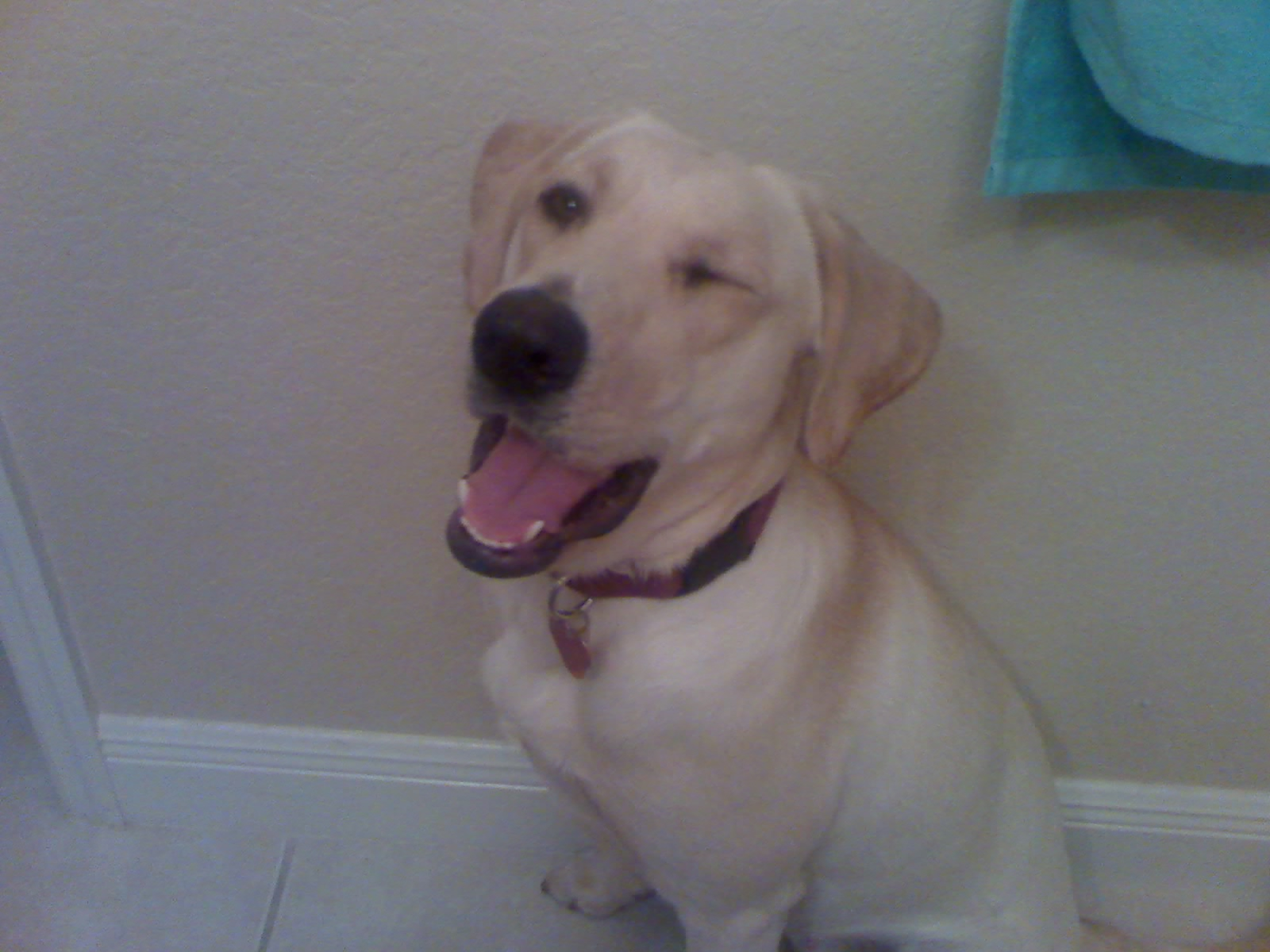
A Labrador Retriever winking

Animal winks are thought to be just as meaningful as humans'. Dogs are said to wink as a sign of non-aggression due to the fact they see extended eye contact as a challenge for dominance. So, when dogs don’t want to fight, they will wink/blink in submission.

Although usually blinking slowly to show affection, cats are also more rarely known to wink to humans and other cats, communicating that it sees the other as trustworthy. This has led some people to refer to this action as a "cat kiss", since the cat is showing love, like human kisses do.

== See also ==
- Blinking
- Body language
- Face
- Forty Winks
- List of emoticons
