= Forty Winks =

Forty winks is an idiom meaning "to get some sleep"

Forty Winks or 40 Winks may also refer to:

- 40 Winks (video game), a 1999 platform video game
- Forty Winks (Bra Stores), bra shops located in Cambridge, MA and Boston, MA
- Forty Winks (1925 film), a comedy silent film
- Forty Winks (1931 film), a film featuring Felix the Cat
- Forty Winks (2022 film), a film starring Susan Sarandon
- Forty Winks (play), a 2004 play by Kevin Elyot
