= Whys and Other Whys =

1927 film

- The short
- Directed by: Otto Messmer
- Produced by: E. W. Hammons
- Music by: Jacques Kopstein (only when the short was re-released by Copley Studios).
- Animation by: Otto Messmer
- Color process: Black and white
- Production company: Pat Sullivan Studios
- Distributed by: Educational Pictures Corporation (original release); Bijou Films, Inc. (sound reissue)
- Release date: November 27, 1927
- Running time: 7 minutes
- Country: United States
- Language: English

Whys and Other Whys (titled Whys and Otherwise in its sound reissue) is a 1927 American silent animated short subject featuring Felix the Cat.

== Plot ==
Felix is supposed to get home early. Instead he spends time drinking booze at a local tavern. By the time he proceeds to go home, he is already late by several minutes. His drunkenness also slows him down.

At the house, his wife is very annoyed and is even holding a rolling pin. She is not happy because he it's taking too long to arrive. Felix finally enters house, and already senses trouble brewing. His wife asks him why he arrived so late, and Felix attempts to make up stories.

Felix tells how he tried to buy a fur coat for her. He also tells how a man scammed him by selling what appeared to be a nice garment but turned out to be a bear which chased and attacked him. She feel sad for him for going through all this, at first after hearing the story. Felix feels relieved that his wife fell for his lie, but she notices his wobbly legs and asks why they are like that.

Felix tells another story, this time on how he tried to deliver a package to her but had trouble with a robber. The robber thinks the package contains something expensive but it was just candies. The robber is disgusted and tosses the package off a cliff and into the sea. Felix jumps in too to rescue to his beloved. As Felix manages to retrieve the box, the waves toss him onto a ship. He is proud to catch the package, but the waves rock the ship, rocking Felix along with it and causing him to feel dizzy. This time, his wife asks why he has a hair strand on his back.

Felix tells the last story. He says that while somehow taking the same box home, he is spotted by a lion which is interested in the box, who ends up escaping from the zoo. Though attacked, Felix prevails in the fight.

His wife finds the stories very farfetched, asking why he is a terrible liar then, pounds Felix with the rolling pin. The cartoon finishes with Felix bruised and covered in bandages.

== See also ==
- Felix the Cat filmography
