= The Non-Stop Fright =

1927 film

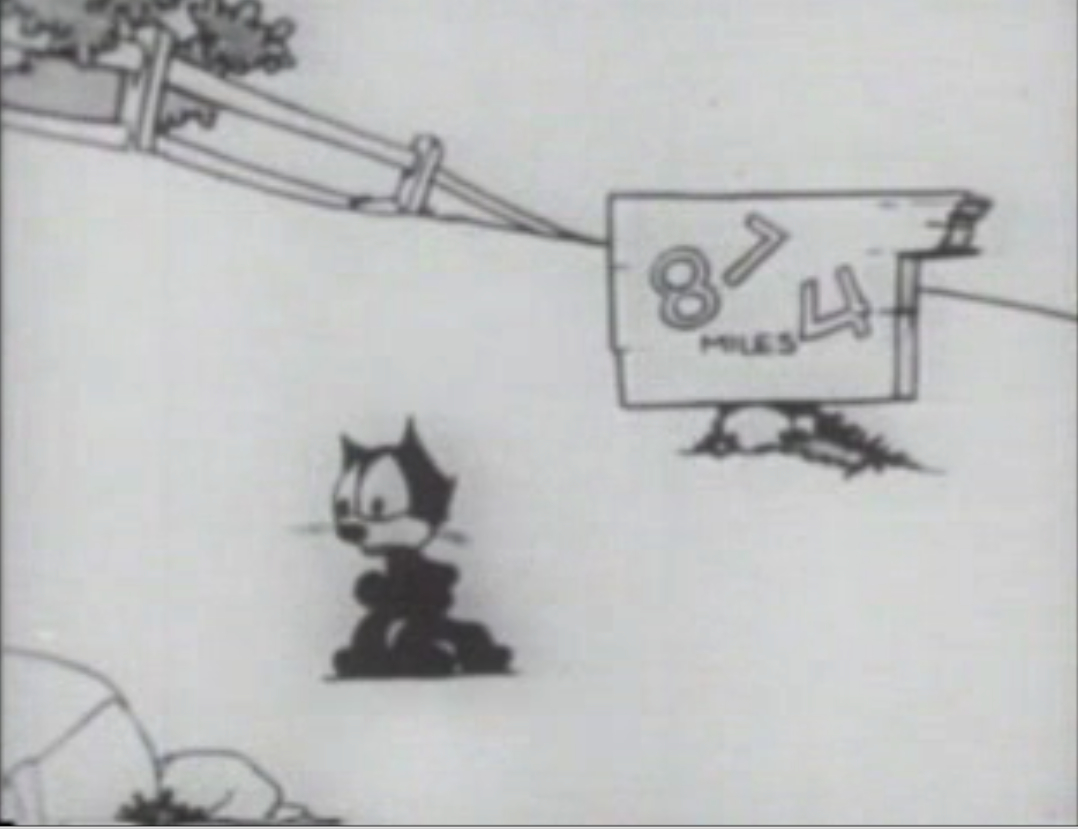
- Screenshot
- Directed by: Otto Messmer
- Produced by: E. W. Hammons
- Music by: Jacques Kopstein (only when the short was re-released by Copley Studios).
- Animation by: Otto Messmer
- Color process: Black and white
- Production company: Pat Sullivan Studios
- Distributed by: Educational Pictures Corporation; Bijou Films, Inc.
- Release date: August 21, 1927
- Running time: 7:37
- Country: United States
- Language: English

The Non-Stop Fright is a 1927 American silent animated short film by Pat Sullivan Studios featuring Felix the Cat. The cartoon was originally silent but was reissued with sound years later.

== Plot ==
Inside a house, Felix is lying flat on the floor and appears to be dead. This is what the maid of the house thought as she sweeps Felix into a dust pan and dumps him in the trash bin just out the window. It turns out Felix is actually alive as he climbs out of the bin and walks away in disgust.

While rambling in the open, Felix finds a newspaper on the ground. In the paper, he reads an ad telling whoever could fly to Timbuktu shall be awarded a prize money of $50K. Felix then constructs an aircraft out of ordinary objects and takes off.

Felix is flying in his self-made aircraft. Things were going smoothly until pesky birds and lightning storms force him to fly lower. As he travels close to the sea, a school of fish leap into his plane, therefore slowing him down. Felix manages to get them off, and carry on in his flight.

Finally, Felix sees his destination and makes a landing. To his surprise, however, he finds nobody waiting for him to offer the prize money. Instead, he sees a pack of hungry cannibals ready to make a meal out of him. The cat makes his run as one of the cannibals approaches. In making his escape from the island, Felix inflates a balloon which carries him upward.

== See also ==
- Felix the Cat filmography
