= The Circus (1920 film) =

1920 film

- Directed by: Otto Messmer
- Produced by: Pat Sullivan
- Animation by: Otto Messmer
- Color process: Black-and-white
- Production company: Pat Sullivan Studios
- Distributed by: Paramount Pictures
- Release date: September 26, 1920
- Running time: 5 minutes
- Country: United States
- Language: English

The Circus, reissued by Pathé as Frolics at the Circus, is an American animated silent short film featuring Felix the Cat and released on September 26, 1920.

== Synopsis ==
The film starts off with a man petting Felix and showing a sleeping elephant in a circus. Then, a mischievous mouse who scares off the elephant and Felix the Cat tracks down the elephant.
