= Flim Flam Films =

1927 film

- Directed by: Otto Messmer
- Produced by: Pat Sullivan
- Animation by: Otto Messmer
- Color process: Black and white
- Production company: Pat Sullivan Studios
- Distributed by: Educational Pictures
- Release date: September 18, 1927
- Running time: 7 minutes
- Country: United States
- Language: English

Flim Flam Films is a 1927 American silent animated short subject featuring Felix the Cat.

== Plot ==
Felix tries to put Inky, Winky and Dinky to bed as part of their nap time but, apparently, they are angry and bored. He then goes to the living room to rest while Kitty is reading a newspaper. The little cats are not sleepy and they cry. Felix gets scared and his wife offers a suggestion of taking the kittens to a cinema.

Felix and the three kittens, Inky, Winky and Dinky are off to a cinema in town. He tries to purchase tickets at a booth but the seller at the cinema entrance informs, furious apparently the four cats that cats are not permitted in the theater. They then disguise themselves as a man, and manage to buy a ticket without the seller realizing. Their disguise, however, does not keep them covered for long when a guard at the cinema spots some bizarreness on top because the tail of Dinky, one of the kittens that was pretending to be the man's hat, ends up getting loose from him. Feeling completely exposed, they split up and flee.

Felix's kittens are still sad until a tear runs from your eyes in wanting watch on the cinema and Felix is angry, until Felix comes up with the idea for the four of them sneak through a tiny opening in the cinema's walls.

The two appear in a light and Felix ends up falling into one of the balls of light and the ball he is in breaks, Inky, Winky and Dinky also appears in other balls in the same light that Felix appeared and he breaks the light and releases the kittens as if cracking eggs while the yolks fall out. Finally inside, they get to see a film, and the one starring in it turns out to be Felix himself, much to the kittens' enjoyment. Felix takes his tail and takes it off himself and uses it as a cane, striking a pose similar to Charlie Chaplin, but when he, in the film gets attacked by a lion, the angry kittens rush forth and assault the screen, probably feeling like Felix had actually been attacked by a lion outside of the movie, therefore, causing a commotion from the audience.

On a field just outside town, the kittens are weeping about never getting to watch something, until Felix, after being worried, had another idea and he tells the little cats that they should create their own film and takes a camera out of his pocket, the kittens agree with his idea.

Using the device, Felix takes videos of a ballet dancer, a marching band, a rising hot air balloon, and a female swimmer in the lake whom Felix flirts with. The kittens also records a clip of Felix flirting with the female swimmer behind his back.

They then return home that night to watch the film they made. The characters in the film, however, appear upside down but Felix is able to make quick adjustments, minus the ballet dancer and the female swimmer, the ballet dancer's clip is not upside down but has a bizarre view, while the female swimmer's clip appears in normal format. When the female swimmer's clip appears, seconds later it shows the clip of Felix flirting with her that Inky, Winky and Dinky recorded, which shows Felix kissing the female swimmer on the mouth twice, which leaves Mrs. Felix terrified, why she thinks Felix cheated on her. Mrs. Felix mercilessly batters Felix, punching him hard twice and catching his foot and knocking him to the ground. Felix is left covered in a lot of bandages and the film ends with Felix raising his hand.

== See also ==
- Felix the Cat filmography
