= Otto Messmer =

American animator (1892–1983)

- Messmer in 1983
- Born: Otto James Messmer; August 16, 1892; Union City, New Jersey, U.S.
- Died: October 28, 1983 (aged 91); Fort Lee, New Jersey, U.S.
- Notable work: Felix the Cat
- Spouse: Ann Messmer
- Children: 2

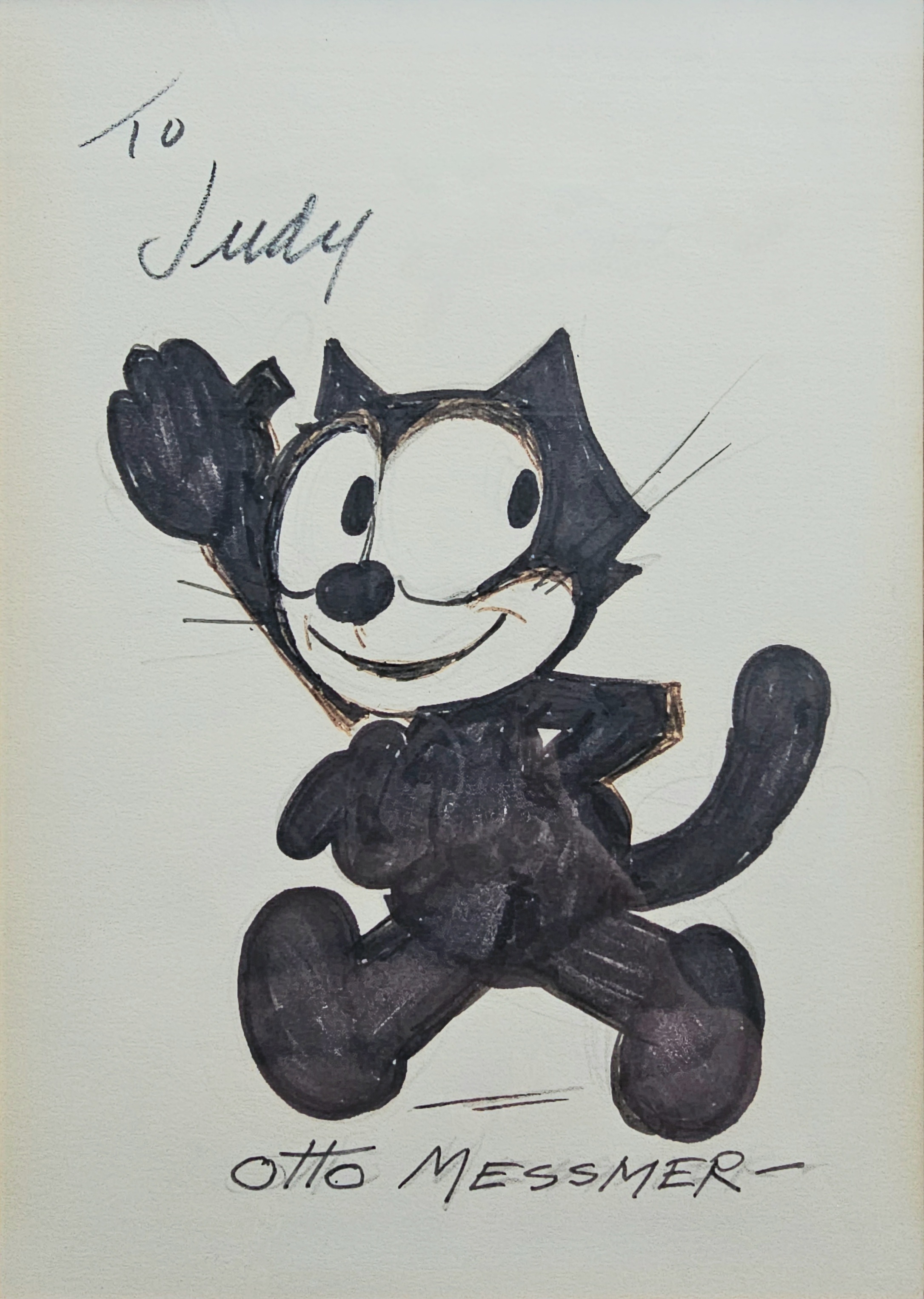
Felix the Cat, Messmer's best-known work

Otto James Messmer (/ˈmɛzmər/; August 16, 1892 – October 28, 1983) was an American animator known for his work on the Felix the Cat cartoons and comic strip produced by the Pat Sullivan studio.

The extent of Messmer's role in the creation and popularity of Felix is a matter of ongoing dispute, particularly as he only laid his claim to the character after the death of Sullivan, who until that time had received the credit.

== Early life ==
Messmer was born on August 16, 1892, to a German Catholic family in West Hoboken, New Jersey (now Union City). He attended Holy Family Parochial School. He had a love of vaudeville and the entertainment industry instilled in him by his parents and teachers which began at a young age. He attended the Thomas School of Art in New York City from 1911 to 1913, and participated in a work-study program with the Acme Agency, where he did illustrations for fashion catalogs.

== Career ==
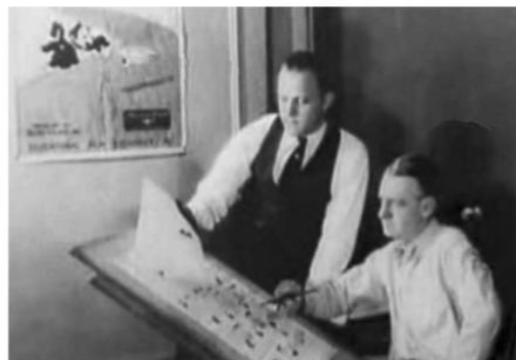
Messmer with Pat Sullivan c. 1920s

Messmer's first love, however, was cartooning. Inspired by Winsor McCay's animated films, such as How a Mosquito Operates, Messmer began creating his comics for local newspapers in 1912, the same year he met Anne Mason, whom he married in 1934. One of his comics, Fun, ran as part of the Sunday comics' page for New York World.

Messmer signed a deal with Universal Studios in 1915 to produce a test film of a character Messmer created called "Motor Mat". It was never released, but drew the interest of animator Pat Sullivan, though Messmer instead decided to go to work with Henry "Hy" Mayer, a well-known cartoonist. Mayer and Messmer collaborated on the successful animated series The Travels of Teddy, which was based on the life of Theodore Roosevelt. Messmer would subsequently work for Sullivan, who handled the business side of the work, with Messmer handling creative responsibilities. When Sullivan served a nine-month prison sentence in 1917, Messmer briefly returned to work with Mayer, until Messmer was drafted into World War I.

When Messmer returned to the United States in 1919, he returned to Sullivan's studio, which was hired by director Earl Hurd of Paramount Screen Magazine for a cartoon short that would accompany a feature film. Sullivan gave the project to Messmer, whose result, Feline Follies, starred Master Tom, a black cat, who was a prototype to Felix, which brought good luck to people in trouble.

Sullivan's involvement in the project is disputed. However, handwriting in the animation has been identified as his. In addition to Sullivan's handwriting in Feline Follies, the Australian term for mother, "MUM", is used in a speech bubble of one of the kittens at the 4:00 mark of Feline Follies.

Felix was the first cartoon character created and developed for the screen, as well as the first to become a licensed, mass-merchandised character. Both his design and his unique character were highly influential. Sullivan took the credit for Felix, and though Messmer directed and was the lead animator on all of the episodes he appeared in, Sullivan's name was the only onscreen credit that appeared in them. Messmer also oversaw the direction of the Felix newspaper strip, doing most of the pencils and inks on the strip until 1954. Walt Disney respected Messmer's work and realized he did the bulk of Sullivan's work, having visited Sullivan's studio in an attempt to hire him to be a director at his own studio. Messmer refused the offer, leading to Disney hiring Burt Gillett in his place.

Felix the Cat starred in over 150 cartoons until 1931, when animation studios began converting to sound films. The newspaper strip's popularity began to fade in the late 1930s, though the character was reintroduced to new fans via comic books in the 1940s. Messmer then teamed with Douglas Leigh on the large moving electronic signs that lit up Times Square.

Messmer also produced more Felix comic books in the 1940s and 1950s for companies such as Dell Comics, Toby Press, and Harvey Comics, as well as doing animation for Famous Studios (Several Popeye cartoons carry his credit). By the 1960s, Felix had been reinvented for television, and Messmer's longtime assistant Joe Oriolo (the creator of Casper the Friendly Ghost) made sure that Messmer was finally credited as the creator of Felix the Cat. Messmer continued working on the character for the rest of his life.

== Death and legacy ==
Messmer died from a heart attack at Holy Name Medical Center in Teaneck, New Jersey on October 28, 1983. He was 91 years old. Today, Felix the Cat is run in syndication in over 250 newspapers all over the world.

== Sources ==
- Mavromatis, Kally; "Felix the Cat – Silent Star of April 1999", accessed April 5, 2007.
- Gordon, Ian. "Felix the Cat". St. James Encyclopedia of Pop Culture. Archived from the original on December 4, 2007 – via FindArticles.
- Canemaker, John. Felix: the Twisted Tale of the World's Most Famous Cat. New York: Pantheon, 1991.
