= List of The Cleveland Show episodes =

Episode list for an animated series

The Cleveland Show is an American adult animated series co-created by Seth MacFarlane, Mike Henry and Richard Appel for Fox. The series focuses on the life of Cleveland Brown (Mike Henry), his son Cleveland Jr. (Kevin Michael Richardson), his wife Donna (Sanaa Lathan) and her kids Roberta (Reagan Gomez-Preston; Nia Long, 2009) and Rallo (Mike Henry).

The series, which was picked up for an initial order of 22 production episodes (1APSxx), was picked up by Fox for a second order of production episodes, consisting of 13 episodes, bringing the total number of ordered episodes to 35. The announcement was made on May 3, 2009, before the series even premiered. It was then picked up for the remaining nine episodes of the second season bringing the total number of episodes ordered to 44. On June 10, 2010, less than three weeks into the first season's summer hiatus, it was announced that Fox was ordering a third season. A fourth season was announced on May 9, 2011.

On April 17, 2013, Fox dismissed increasing rumors that The Cleveland Show had been cancelled, reporting rather that renewal of the series was undetermined as of that time. However, on May 13, 2013, less than 6 days before the last two episodes aired, in the New York Daily News, Fox Chairman of Entertainment Kevin Reilly confirmed its cancellation. Following the series cancellation, it was confirmed that Cleveland and the Brown/Tubbs family would be moving back to Quahog to rejoin the Family Guy cast.

During the course of the series, 88 episodes of The Cleveland Show aired over four seasons, between September 27, 2009, and May 19, 2013.

== Series overview ==
Season	Episodes	Originally released		Rank	Average viewership (in millions)
Season	Episodes	First released	Last released	Rank	Average viewership (in millions)
1	21	September 27, 2009	May 23, 2010	72	6.38
2	22	September 26, 2010	May 15, 2011	90	6.12
3	22	September 25, 2011	May 20, 2012	144	4.03
4	23	October 7, 2012	May 19, 2013	129	3.05

== Episodes ==
=== Season 1 (2009–10) ===
No. overall	No. in season	Title	Directed by	Written by	Original release date	Prod. code	U.S. viewers (millions)
1	1	"Pilot"	Anthony Lioi	Seth MacFarlane, Richard Appel & Mike Henry	September 27, 2009	1APS01	9.51
2	2	"Da Doggone Daddy-Daughter Dinner Dance"	Chuck Klein	Julius Sharpe	October 4, 2009	1APS02	8.86
3	3	"The One About Friends"	Oreste Canestrelli	Jonathan Green & Gabe Miller	October 11, 2009	1APS04	7.87
4	4	"Birth of a Salesman"	Chris Graham & Anthony Lioi	Kirker Butler	October 18, 2009	1APS03	7.62
5	5	"Cleveland Jr.'s Cherry Bomb"	Mike L. Mayfield	Aseem Batra	November 8, 2009	1APS08	6.44
6	6	"Ladies' Night"	Justin Ridge	Clarence Livingston	November 15, 2009	1APS07	7.13
7	7	"A Brown Thanksgiving"	Chuck Klein & Matt Engstrom	Matt Murray	November 22, 2009	1APS09	6.56
8	8	"From Bed to Worse"	Anthony Agrusa	Teri Schaffer & Raynelle Swilling	November 29, 2009	1APS05	7.17
9	9	"A Cleveland Brown Christmas"	Oreste Canestrelli	Jonathan Green & Gabe Miller	December 13, 2009	1APS11	6.53
10	10	"Field of Streams"	Ian Graham	Aaron Lee	January 3, 2010	1APS06	6.94
11	11	"Love Rollercoaster"	Ron Rubio	Kirker Butler	January 10, 2010	1APS10	8.54
12	12	"Our Gang"	Anthony Agrusa	Aaron Lee	January 31, 2010	1APS12	4.50
13	13	"Buried Pleasure"	Ian Graham	Julius Sharpe	February 14, 2010	1APS13	4.87
14	14	"The Curious Case of Jr. Working at The Stool"	Justin Ridge	Kevin Biggins & Travis Bowe	February 21, 2010	1APS14	5.58
15	15	"Once Upon a Tyne in New York"	Mike L. Mayfield	Aaron Lee	March 21, 2010	1APS16	5.07
16	16	"The Brown Knight"	Matt Engstrom	Aseem Batra	March 28, 2010	1APS17	5.64
17	17	"Gone With the Wind"	Ron Rubio	Bill Oakley	April 11, 2010	1APS18	5.50
18	18	"Brotherly Love"	Anthony Agrusa	Justin Heimberg	May 2, 2010	1APS20	5.78
19	19	"Brown History Month"	Ian Graham	Matt Murray	May 9, 2010	1APS21	5.30
20	20	"Cleveland's Angels"	Oreste Canestrelli	Clarence Livingston	May 16, 2010	1APS19	5.86
21	21	"You're the Best Man, Cleveland Brown"	Justin Ridge	Kirker Butler	May 23, 2010	1APS22	4.94

=== Season 2 (2010–11) ===
No. overall	No. in season	Title	Directed by	Written by	Original release date	Prod. code	U.S. viewers (millions)
22	1	"Harder, Better, Faster, Browner"	Ian Graham	Matt Murray	September 26, 2010	2APS06	6.61
23	2	"Cleveland Live!"	Ken Wong	Jonathan Green & Gabe Miller	October 3, 2010	2APS01	6.70
24	3	"How Cleveland Got His Groove Back"	Oreste Canestrelli	Julius Sharpe	October 10, 2010	2APS05	5.63
25	4	"It's the Great Pancake, Cleveland Brown"	Ron Rubio	Aseem Batra	November 7, 2010	2APS04	6.68
26	5	"Little Man on Campus"	Anthony Agrusa	Kevin Biggins & Travis Bowe	November 14, 2010	2APS03	6.66
27	6	"Fat and Wet"	Matt Engstrom	Kirker Butler	November 21, 2010	2APS02	5.07
28	7	"Another Bad Thanksgiving"	Mike L. Mayfield	Clarence Livingston	November 28, 2010	2APS08	7.39
29	8	"Murray Christmas"	Ken Wong	Kirker Butler	December 5, 2010	2APS09	6.97
30	9	"Beer Walk!"	Jim Shellhorn	Aaron Lee	December 5, 2010	2APS07	5.96
31	10	"Ain't Nothin' But Mutton Bustin'"	Matt Engstrom	Courtney Lilly	January 9, 2011	2APS10	7.39
32	11	"How Do You Solve a Problem Like Roberta?"	Anthony Agrusa	Aaron Lee	January 16, 2011	2APS12	5.52
33	12	"Like a Boss"	Ron Rubio	Matt Murray	January 23, 2011	2APS11	5.19
34	13	"A Short Story and a Tall Tale"	Ian Graham	Julius Sharpe	February 13, 2011	2APS14	4.75
35	14	"Terry Unmarried"	Ken Wong	Aaron Lee	February 20, 2011	2APS17	5.43
36	15	"The Blue, The Gray, and The Brown"	Oreste Canestrelli	Jonathan Green & Gabe Miller	March 6, 2011	2APS13	4.80
37	16	"The Way the Cookie Crumbles"	Jim Shellhorn	Chadd Gindin	March 13, 2011	2APS15	4.64
38	17	"To Live and Die in VA"	Seung-Woo Cha	Mehar Sethi	March 20, 2011	2APS16	5.45
39	18	"The Essence of Cleveland"	Matt Engstrom	Jonathan Green & Gabe Miller	April 3, 2011	2APS18	4.81
40	19	"Ship'rect"	Ken Wong	Teri Schaffer & Raynelle Swilling	April 10, 2011	1APS15	4.93
41	20	"Back to Cool"	Anthony Agrusa	Kevin Biggins & Travis Bowe	April 17, 2011	2APS19	4.61
42	21	"Your Show of Shows"	Oreste Canestrelli	Story by : Carl Reiner; Teleplay by : Aseem Batra & Matt Murray	May 8, 2011	2APS21	4.70
43	22	"Hot Cocoa Bang Bang"	Ian Graham	Kirker Butler	May 15, 2011	2APS22	4.90

=== Season 3 (2011–12) ===
No. overall	No. in season	Title	Directed by	Written by	Original release date	Prod. code	US viewers (millions)
44	1	"BFFs"	Steve Robertson	Kirker Butler	September 25, 2011	3APS01	6.13
45	2	"The Hurricane!"	Ron Rubio	Kirker Butler	October 2, 2011	2APS20	5.56
46	3	"Nightmare on Grace Street"	Phil Allora	Jonathan Green & Gabe Miller	October 30, 2011	3APS04	4.66
47	4	"Skip Day"	Jack Perkins	Dave Jeser & Matt Silverstein	November 20, 2011	3APS03	3.86
48	5	"Yemen Party"	Seung-Woo Cha	Julius Sharpe	November 27, 2011	3APS02	3.67
49	6	"Sex and the Biddy"	Ron Rubio	Aseem Batra	December 4, 2011	3APS06	5.47
50	7	"Die Semi-Hard"	Seung-Woo Cha	John Viener	December 11, 2011	3APS10	5.07
51	8	"Y Tu Junior Tambien"	Jack Perkins	Aaron Lee	January 8, 2012	3APS11	4.48
52	9	"There Goes El Neighborhood"	Ron Rubio	Courtney Lilly	January 29, 2012	3APS14	2.75
53	10	"Dancing with the Stools"	Anthony Agrusa	Matt Murray	February 12, 2012	3APS05	2.72
54	11	"Brown Magic"	Anthony Agrusa	Chadd Gindin	February 19, 2012	3APS13	2.61
55	12	"'Til Deaf"	Oreste Canestrelli	Aaron Lee	March 4, 2012	3APS07	3.11
56	13	"Das Shrimp Boot"	Oreste Canestrelli	John Viener	March 11, 2012	3APS15	3.35
57	14	"March Dadness"	Ian Graham	Jonathan Green & Gabe Miller	March 18, 2012	3APS16	3.22
58	15	"The Men in Me"	Steve Robertson	Clarence Livingston	March 25, 2012	3APS09	3.12
59	16	"Frapp Attack!"	Phil Allora	Kevin Biggins & Travis Bowe	April 1, 2012	3APS12	2.87
60	17	"American Prankster"	Seung-Woo Cha	Bill Oakley	April 15, 2012	3APS18	4.34
61	18	"B.M.O.C."	Steve Robertson	Kirker Butler	April 29, 2012	3APS17	3.12
62	19	"Jesus Walks"	Phil Allora	Kirker Butler	April 29, 2012	3APS20	4.06
63	20	"Flush of Genius"	Jack Perkins	Aaron Lee	May 6, 2012	3APS19	3.11
64	21	"Mama Drama"	Anthony Agrusa	Chadd Gindin	May 13, 2012	3APS21	2.79
65	22	"All You Can Eat"	Ian Graham	Story by : Aseem Batra & Bill Oakley; Teleplay by : Aseem Batra	May 20, 2012	3APS24	3.01

=== Season 4 (2012–13) ===
No. overall	No. in season	Title	Directed by	Written by	Original release date	Prod. code	US viewers (millions)
66	1	"Escape from Goochland"	Jack Perkins	Courtney Lilly	October 7, 2012	4APS04	4.47
67	2	"Menace II Secret Society"	Ron Rubio	Clarence Livingston	November 4, 2012	3APS22	3.95
68	3	"A General Thanksgiving Episode"	Justin Ridge	Courtney Lilly	November 18, 2012	3APS08	3.26
69	4	"Turkey Pot Die"	Anthony Agrusa	Dave Jeser & Matt Silverstein	November 25, 2012	4APS06	4.32
70	5	"A Vas Deferens Between Men & Women"	Jeff Myers	John Viener	December 2, 2012	4APS02	3.37
71	6	"Tis the Cleveland to Be Sorry"	Oreste Canestrelli	Chadd Gindin	December 16, 2012	4APS08	3.06
72	7	"Hustle 'N' Bros"	Seung-Woo Cha	Kirker Butler	January 13, 2013	4APS03	2.66
73	8	"Wide World of Cleveland Show"	Ron Rubio	Aaron Lee	January 27, 2013	4APS07	2.57
74	9	"Here Comes the Bribe"	Jack Perkins	Dave Jeser & Matt Silverstein	February 10, 2013	4APS12	2.76
75	10	"When a Man (or a Freight Train) Loves His Cookie"	Phil Allora	Clarence Livingston	February 17, 2013	4APS05	2.63
76	11	"Brownsized"	Phil Allora	Steven Ross	March 3, 2013	4APS13	3.28
77	12	"Pins, Spins and Fins! (Shark Story Cut for Time)"	Steve Robertson	Jonathan Green & Gabe Miller	March 3, 2013	4APS09	3.78
78	13	"A Rodent Like This"	Seung-Woo Cha	Aaron Lee	March 10, 2013	4APS11	4.04
79	14	"The Hangover: Part Tubbs"	Ron Rubio	Aaron Lee	March 17, 2013	4APS14	2.83
80	15	"California Dreamin' (All the Cleves Are Brown)"	Oreste Canestrelli	Dave Jeser & Matt Silverstein	March 17, 2013	3APS23	4.05
81	16	"Who Done Did It?"	Jeff Myers	Kevin Biggins & Travis Bowe	April 7, 2013	4APS10	3.38
82	17	"The Fist and the Furious"	Anthony Agrusa	Jonathan Green & Gabe Miller	April 14, 2013	4APS15	2.50
83	18	"Squirt's Honor"	Oreste Canestrelli	Daniel Dratch	April 21, 2013	4APS16	2.02
84	19	"Grave Danger"	Steve Robertson	Kirker Butler	April 28, 2013	4APS17	2.66
85	20	"Of Lice and Men"	Jeff Myers	Story by : John Viener; Teleplay by : Kevin Biggins & Travis Bowe	May 12, 2013	4APS18	1.89
86	21	"Mr. & Mrs. Brown"	Steve Robertson	Kevin Biggins & Travis Bowe	May 12, 2013	4APS01	2.26
87	22	"Crazy Train"	Seung-Woo Cha	Chadd Gindin	May 19, 2013	4APS19	2.14
88	23	"Wheel! Of! Family!"	Jack Perkins	Margee Magee, Angeli Millan & Courtney Lilly	May 19, 2013	4APS20	2.43

== Ratings ==
The Cleveland Show : U.S. viewers per episode (millions)

Season	Episode number																							Average
Season	1	2	3	4	5	6	7	8	9	10	11	12	13	14	15	16	17	18	19	20	21	22	23	Average
1	9.51	8.86	7.87	7.62	6.44	7.13	6.56	7.17	6.53	6.94	8.14	4.50	4.87	5.58	5.07	5.64	5.50	5.78	5.30	5.86	4.94	–		6.38
2	6.61	6.70	5.63	6.68	6.66	5.07	7.39	6.97	5.96	7.39	5.52	5.19	4.75	5.43	4.80	4.64	5.45	4.81	4.93	4.61	4.70	4.90	–	6.12
3	6.13	5.56	4.66	3.86	3.67	5.47	5.07	4.48	2.75	2.72	2.61	3.11	3.35	3.22	3.12	2.87	4.34	3.12	4.06	3.11	2.79	3.01	–	4.03
4	4.47	3.95	3.26	4.32	3.37	3.06	2.66	2.57	2.76	2.63	3.28	3.78	4.04	2.83	4.05	3.38	2.50	2.02	2.66	1.89	2.26	2.14	2.43	3.05

Audience measurement performed by Nielsen Media Research
