= List of Family Guy cast members =

Cast list for an animated series

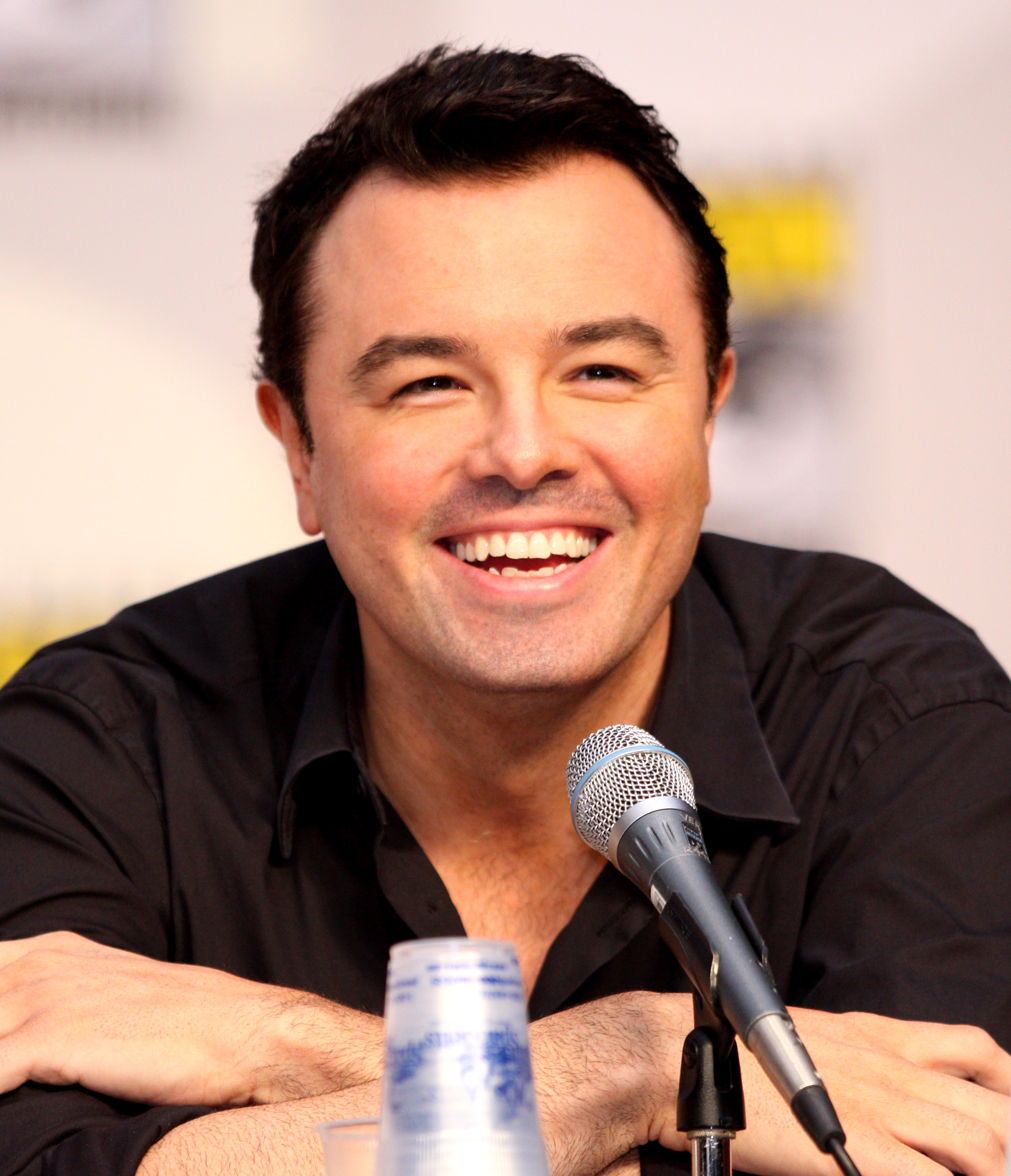
Family Guy creator Seth MacFarlane also provides the voices of Peter Griffin, Stewie Griffin, Brian Griffin, and Glenn Quagmire.

Family Guy is an American animated sitcom that features five main voice actors, and numerous regular cast and recurring guest stars. The principal voice cast consists of show creator Seth MacFarlane, Alex Borstein, Mila Kunis (who replaced Lacey Chabert after the first season (her last episode is "Holy Crap," now marketed as the second episode of season two)), Seth Green, and Mike Henry; Patrick Warburton and Arif Zahir were later added to the main cast (the former being promoted from recurring cast); Recurring voice actors include Adam West, Sam Elliott, John G. Brennan, Nicole Sullivan and Jennifer Tilly, and repeat guest stars include Phyllis Diller, Charles Durning, Rush Limbaugh, James Woods and Phil LaMarr.

Many cast members provide voices for multiple characters. The voice actors, in portraying the various character personalities on the show, draw inspiration from celebrities and pop culture. Family Guy characters have been played by more than one actor, after members of the show left the series or had conflicting obligations.

Kunis was nominated for an Annie Award for voicing Meg Griffin in the season 5 episode "Barely Legal" and MacFarlane has also won an Emmy Award for Outstanding Voice-Over Performance and an Annie Award for Best Voice Acting in an Animated Television Production, though no other cast member has won an award for their work on the series.

== Current cast ==
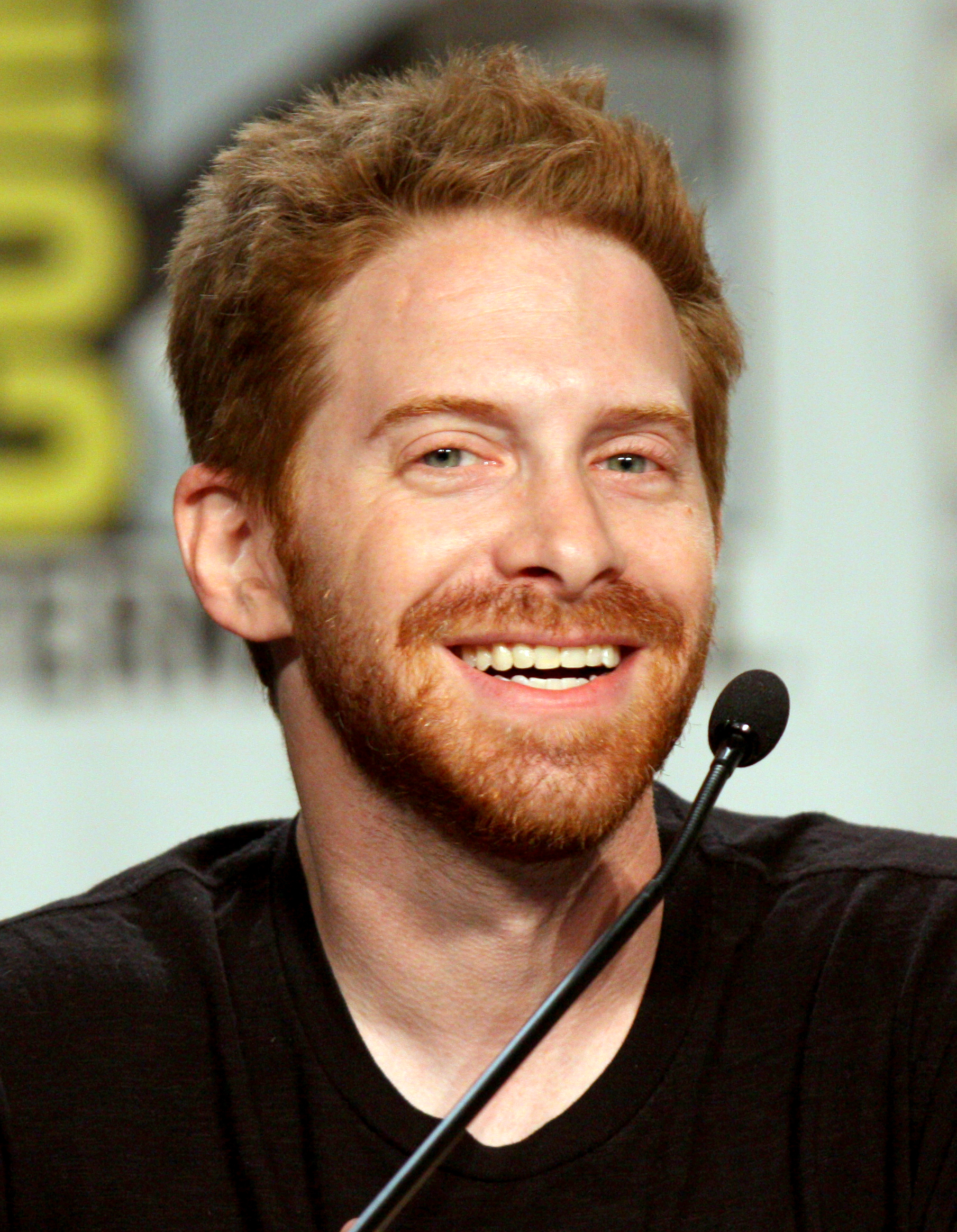
Seth Green provides the voice of Chris Griffin.

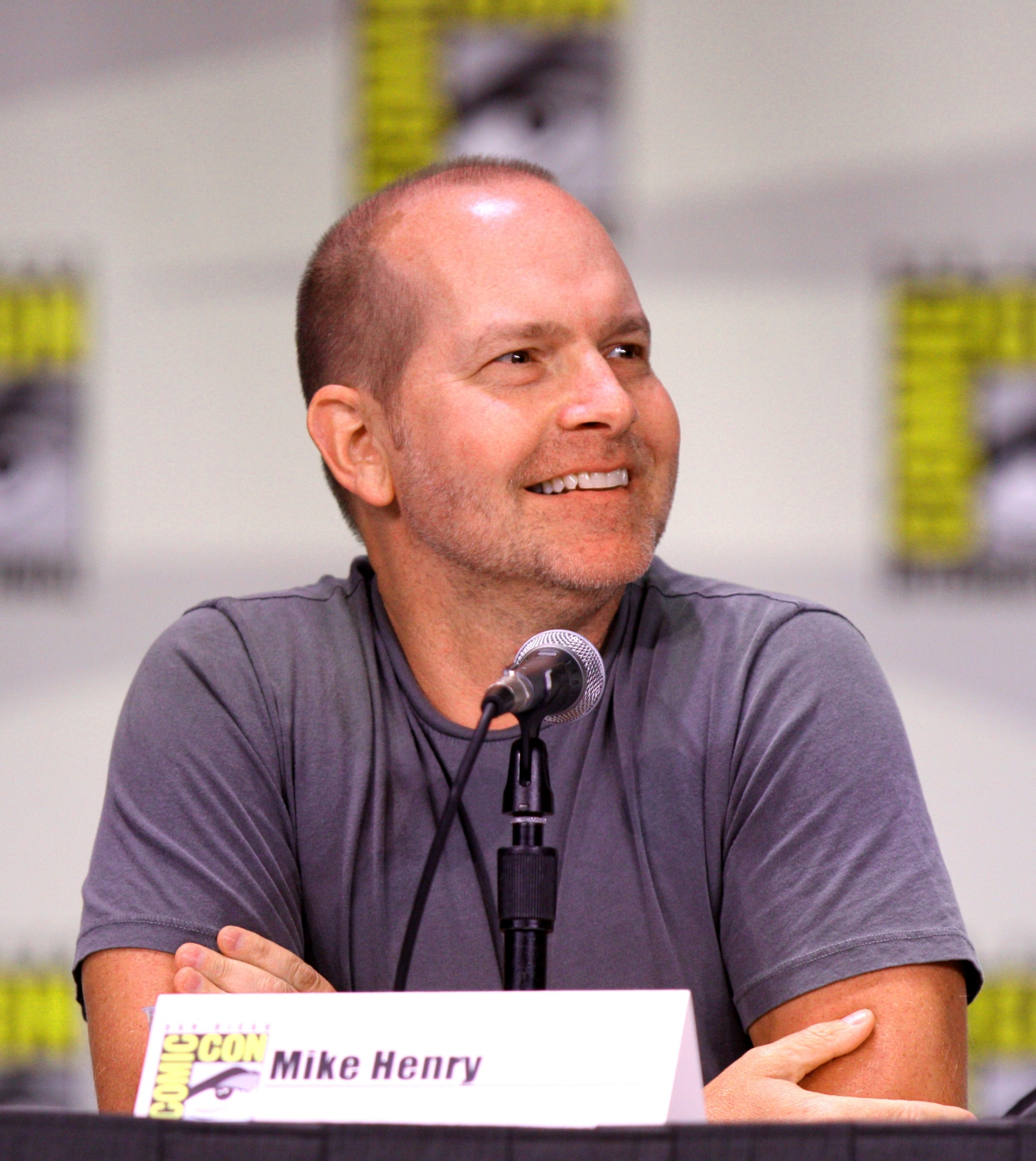
Mike Henry voices various characters in the series.

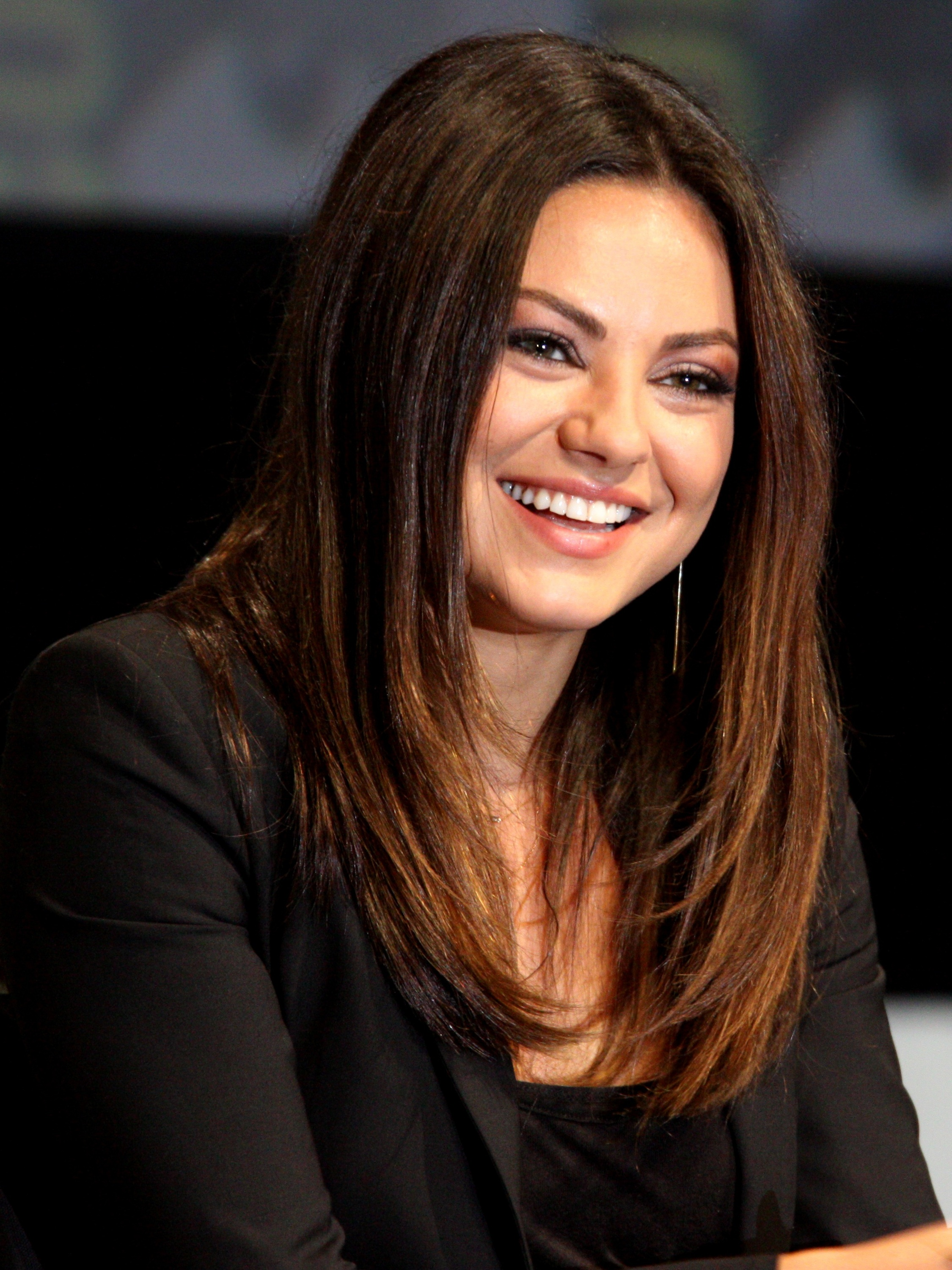
Mila Kunis provides the voice of Meg Griffin.

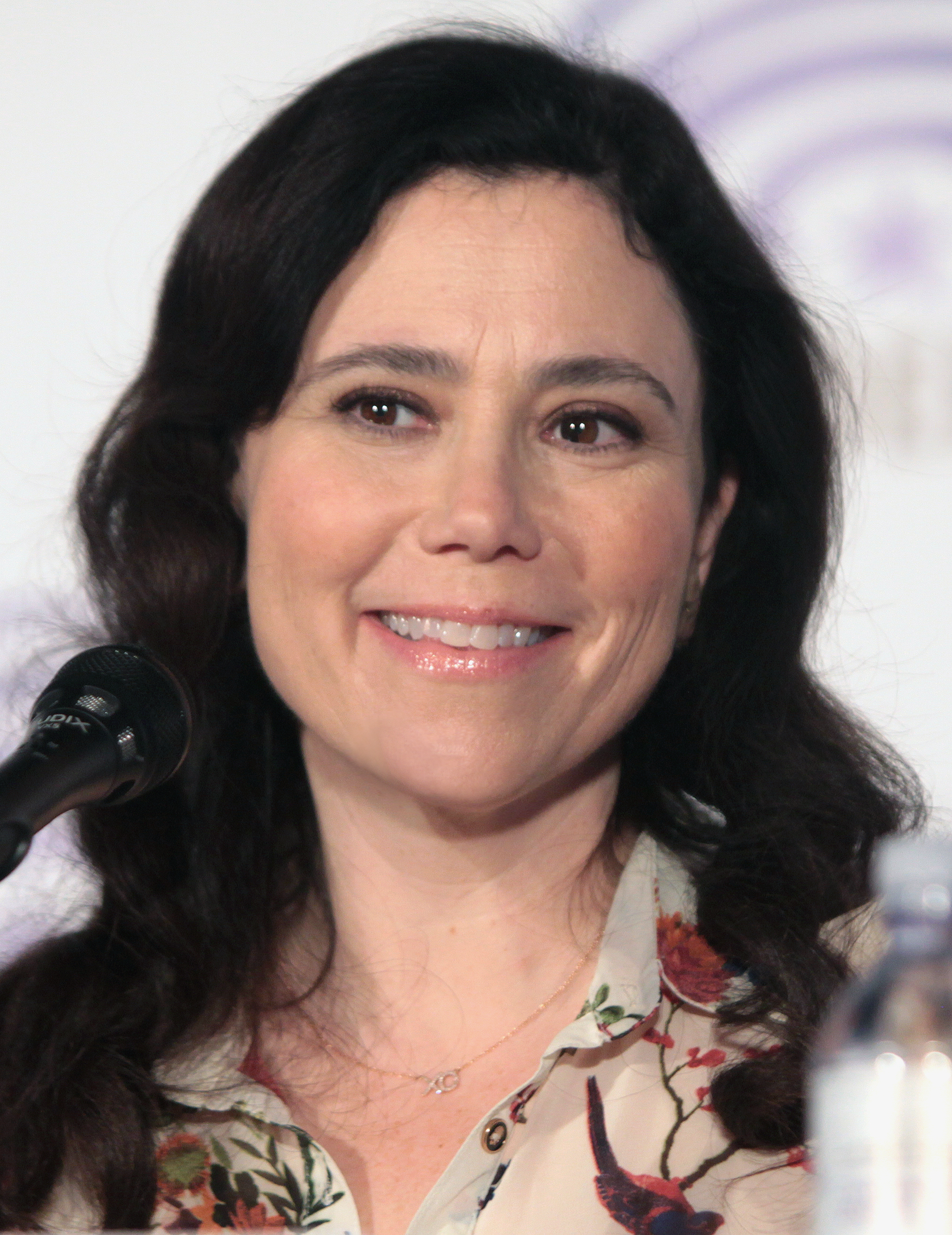
Alex Borstein provides the voice of Lois Griffin.

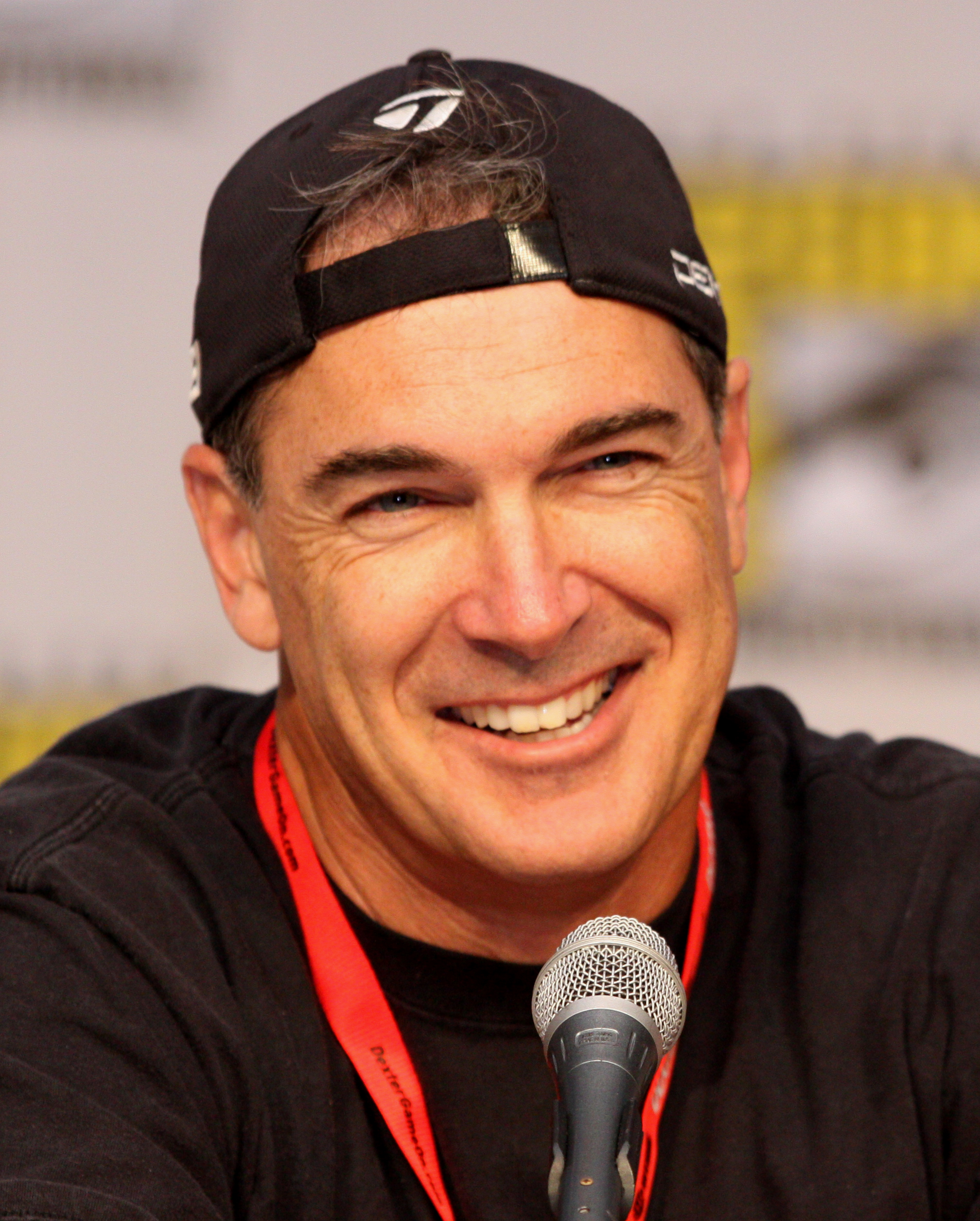
Patrick Warburton provides the voice of Joe Swanson.

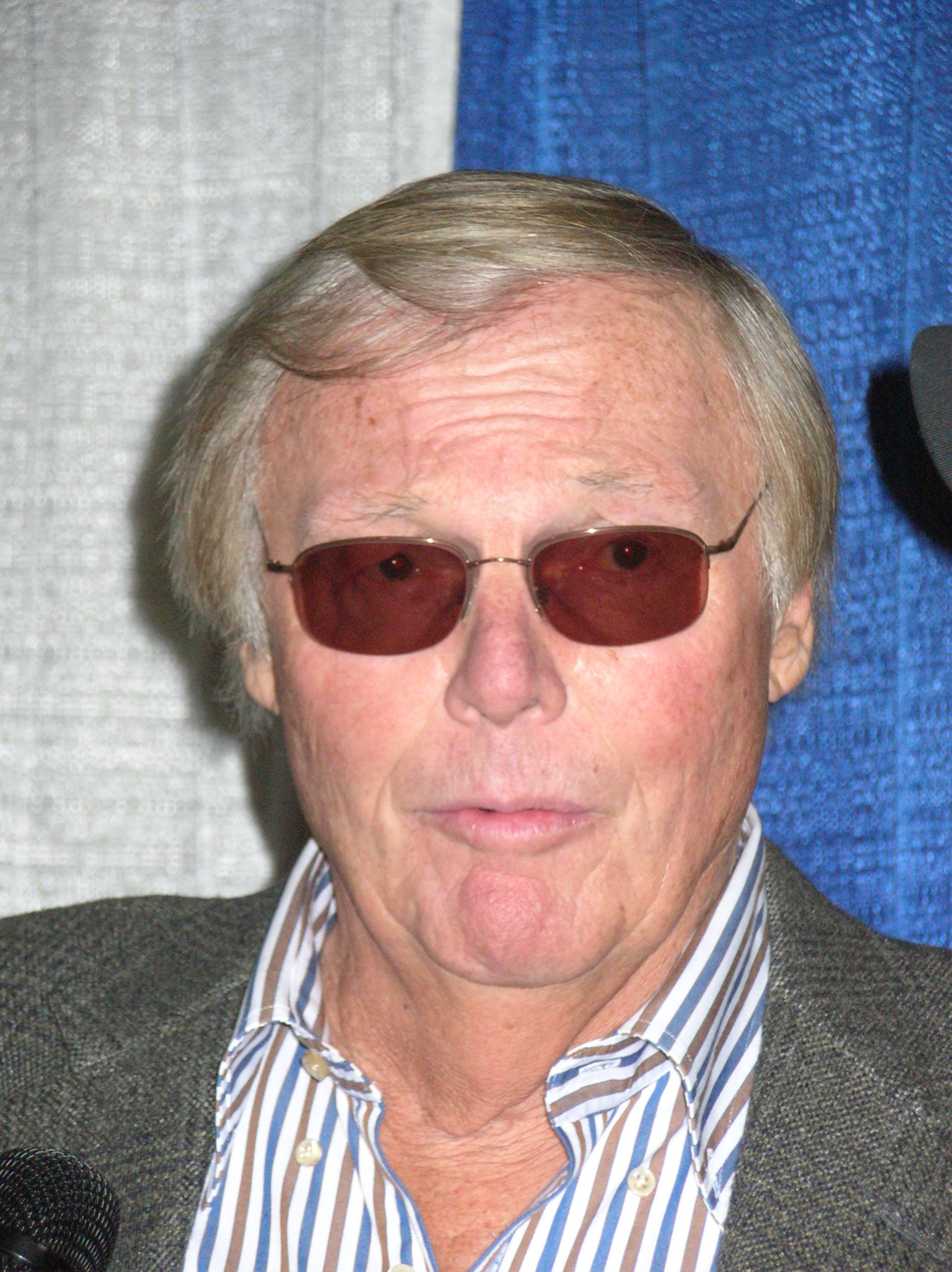
Adam West provided the voice of a fictionalized version of himself.

From seasons 1 to 4, Family Guy had four main cast members. Since season 5, there have been five main cast members. The casting of Meg Griffin changed after season 1.

=== Seth MacFarlane ===
Seth MacFarlane voices four of the show's main characters: Peter Griffin, Brian Griffin, Stewie Griffin, and Glenn Quagmire. MacFarlane chose to voice these characters himself, believing it would be easier to portray the voices he had already envisioned than for someone else to attempt it. MacFarlane drew inspiration for the voice of Peter from a security guard he overheard talking while attending the Rhode Island School of Design. Stewie's voice was based on the voice of English actor Rex Harrison, especially his performance in the 1964 musical drama film My Fair Lady. The voice for Glenn Quagmire is based on 1940s and 1950s radio commercials. MacFarlane uses his own voice while portraying Brian.

MacFarlane also provides the voices for various other recurring and one-time only characters, including news anchor Tom Tucker, Lois' father Carter Pewterschmidt and Dr. Hartman. He is the only cast member to be in every episode.

=== Alex Borstein ===
Alex Borstein voices Lois Griffin, Asian correspondent Tricia Takanawa, Loretta Brown and Lois' mother Barbara Pewterschmidt. Borstein was asked to provide a voice for the pilot while she was working on MADtv. She had not met MacFarlane or seen any of his artwork and said it was "really sight unseen". At the time, Borstein performed in a stage show in Los Angeles, in which she played a redhead mother whose voice she had based on one of her cousins. The voice was originally slower (and deeper for the original season), but when MacFarlane heard it, he replied "Make it a little less fucking annoying ... and speed it up, or every episode will last four hours."

=== Seth Green ===
Seth Green primarily plays Chris Griffin and Neil Goldman. Green stated that he did an impression of the "Buffalo Bill" character from the thriller film The Silence of the Lambs during his audition. His main inspiration for Chris' voice came from envisioning how "Buffalo Bill" would sound if he were speaking through a public address system at a McDonald's.

=== Mila Kunis ===
Mila Kunis voices Meg Griffin. Kunis won the role after the auditions and a slight rewrite of the character, in part due to her performance on That '70s Show. MacFarlane called Kunis back after her first audition, instructing her to speak slower, and then told her to come back another time and enunciate more. Once she claimed that she had it under control, MacFarlane hired her. Kunis described her character as "the scapegoat". She further explained, "Meg gets picked on a lot. But it's funny. It's like the middle child. She is constantly in the state of being an awkward 14-year-old, when you're kind of going through puberty and what-not. She's just in a perpetual mode of humiliation. And it's fun."

=== Mike Henry ===
Mike Henry is the voice of Cleveland Brown, John “The Pervert” Herbert, Bruce, Consuela, and various other characters. A Family Guy writer and producer, he began acting on the show as part of the recurring cast repertory (see below) but was promoted to main cast member in 2005. Since the cancellation of The Cleveland Show, he also voices Cleveland's step-son Rallo Tubbs on Family Guy. On June 26, 2020, after twenty years of voicing the character, Mike Henry announced on Twitter that he was stepping down from voicing Cleveland, stating "persons of color should play characters of color." On September 25, 2020, it was announced that Arif Zahir would take over as the voice of Cleveland.

== Recurring cast ==
In addition to both its main cast and guest stars, Family Guy utilizes a deep bench of regularly appearing supporting voice actors. Some appear in nearly every episode each season, while others appear less frequently. Some of these actors specifically play recurring characters, while others mainly play background citizens of Quahog or characters in cutaway gags.

The current supporting cast repertory includes the following actors:

Actor	Character(s)	No. of episodes (Out of 349 produced)	Notes
H. Jon Benjamin	Carl	27	Since 2006.
Johnny Brennan	Mort Goldman, Horace the bartender	93	
Steve Callaghan	Various	71	Also the current showrunner and executive producer of Family Guy and former showrunner/EP of American Dad!.
Chris Cox	Various	114	
Damien Fahey	Various	27	Also a Family Guy writer.
Ralph Garman	Various	235	Since 2001.
Christine Lakin	Joyce Kinney and various others	32	Since 2010.
Phil LaMarr	Ollie Williams and Judge Dignified Q. Blackman	67	
Rachael MacFarlane	Olivia Fuller and various women	113	Formerly one of the most frequent female voices. She reduced her number of appearances per season after joining American Dad! in 2005 but still appears several times per season. Seth MacFarlane's sister.
Mark Hentemann	Opie and various others	74	Ex-producer. Also a Family Guy writer.
Kevin Michael Richardson	Jerome the bartender and Cleveland Jr.	82	Since 1999.
Chris Sheridan	Various	44	Also a Family Guy writer.
Danny Smith	Various, including Evil Monkey, Al Harrington and Ernie, the Giant Chicken	254	Also a Family Guy writer.
Alec Sulkin	Jesus and various others	206	Since 2005. Also a Family Guy writer.
Fred Tatasciore	Various	92	
Josh Robert Thompson	Various	56	Since 2011.
Jennifer Tilly	Bonnie Swanson	72	Has recurred as the Griffin's neighbor since the first season.
John Viener	Various	276	Since 2005, he has been one of the most frequently heard male voices aside from Seth MacFarlane. Also a Family Guy writer.
Patrick Warburton	Joe Swanson	250	Has appeared as the Griffins' neighbor since the first season. Warburton is the most frequently appearing one-character actor in the supporting repertory.
Gary Cole	Principal Shepherd and various others	93	Since 2000.

In addition to the above, the following actors were formerly regularly recurring voice actors in the series:

Actor	Character(s)	No. of episodes	Notes
Lori Alan	Diane Simmons	63	Left the show in season nine when her character was killed off. Was replaced in the series' context by Christine Lakin's Joyce Kinney
Alexandra Breckenridge	Various women	64	2005–2018. Formerly voices most female “extras” not voiced by Alex Borstein, Breckenridge is no longer a various characters on Family Guy, She left the show from 13 years.
Carlos Alazraqui	Mr. Weed	10	Peter's first boss, Mr. Weed, was killed off early in the series' run.
Drew Barrymore	Jillian Russell	12	Played Jillian, Brian's former girlfriend. The character still appears in background roles.
Butch Hartman	Various	8	
Mike Henry	Cleveland Brown, Herbert, Bruce, Consuela, and various others		Was promoted to main cast in 2005. Also a Family Guy writer.
Carrie Fisher	Angela	19	Recurring role as Peter's boss since 2005. Died in 2016.
Tara Strong	Various, as well as Meg's singing voice	24	2000–2018.
Nicole Sullivan	Muriel Goldman and various others	33	2000–2022. Muriel was killed off in season nine (2010).
Lisa Wilhoit	Connie D'Amico and various others	21	2000–2020.
Adam West	Mayor Adam West	118	Played a warped version of himself as the mayor of Quahog. Died in 2017.
Mae Whitman	Various	36	Was a recurring female voice for several seasons between 2008–2019 and again for one episode in 2023.
Wally Wingert	Various	43	1999–2017.
Wellesley Wild	Various	15	2008–2019. Ex-producer.

== Recurring guest voices ==
The recurring guest voices include Norm Macdonald and Adam Carolla as Death, Patrick Stewart as Susie Swanson, Scott Grimes as Kevin Swanson, Sanaa Lathan as Donna Tubbs Brown and Emily Osment as Ruth Cochamer. Previous recurring guests included Phyllis Diller in three episodes as Peter's Mother, Thelma, and Charles Durning as Peter's father, Francis. Both characters have since died, but Durning returned once to play Francis as a ghost. Early in the show's run, Fred Willard and Jane Lynch had a recurring role as a family of nudists and James Woods as himself. In 2020, it was announced that Sam Elliott would take over as Quahog's new mayor, Mayor West's estranged cousin Wyld West.

== Casting changes ==
- Lacey Chabert voiced Meg for the first production season (14 episodes), but, because of a contractual agreement, was never credited. Chabert left the series due to time constraints with her acting role in Party of Five, as well as schoolwork.
- Jon Cryer voiced Kevin Swanson in his first appearance before the role passed to Seth MacFarlane. The character was written out of the series for several years, with Scott Grimes taking over the voice when the character returned.
- Fairuza Balk was the original voice of high school bully Connie D'Amico until Lisa Wilhoit took over the character from the third season onward.
- Natasha Melnick was the original voice of Meg Griffin's Friend Ruth Cochamer until Emily Osment took over the character in the eleventh season.
- Beginning in 2021-onward, Arif Zahir took over voicing Cleveland Brown from Mike Henry.

== Awards and nominations ==
Year	Actor	Award	Category	Role	Result	Ref.
2000	Seth MacFarlane	Primetime Emmy Award	Outstanding Voice-Over Performance	Stewie Griffin	Won	
2009	Seth MacFarlane	Primetime Emmy Award	Outstanding Voice-Over Performance	Peter Griffin	Won	
2006	Seth MacFarlane	Annie Award	Best Voice Acting in an Animated Television Production	Stewie Griffin	Won	
2007	Mila Kunis	Annie Award	Voice Acting in an Animated Television Production	Meg Griffin	Won	
