= Field of Streams (The Cleveland Show) =

- The Cleveland Show episode
- Episode no.: Season 1 Episode 10
- Directed by: Ian Graham
- Written by: Aaron Lee
- Production code: 1APS06
- Original air date: January 3, 2010

Episode chronology
← Previous "A Cleveland Brown Christmas"	Next → "Love Rollercoaster"
- The Cleveland Show season 1

"Field of Streams" is the tenth episode of the first season of the American animated television series The Cleveland Show. Written by Aaron Lee and directed by Ian Graham, the episode originally aired on January 3, 2010 on Fox.

In this episode, after a nostalgic flashback to the glory days as his high school’s baseball all-star, Cleveland visits his alma mater to find out there’s no longer a team because he and his friends insulted Wally as a teen. Now Principal Wally gives Cleveland one week to raise money to re-build the stadium before the season begins. They raise the cash from a generous donation by Mr. Waterman and organize the team on time. Cleveland then steps in as head coach and dusts off his retired jersey in an attempt to convince Cleveland Jr. to play ball instead of joining the math club.

== Plot ==
As Cleveland and his friend/co-worker Terry are driving around at work, they have a flashback of their days on the high school’s baseball team where Cleveland, known as "Hot Brown" was the all-star and had his jersey retired after his senior year. After the two go to the mall and beat up a swarm of old ladies (based on the real-life Red Hat Society), they visit the high school only to find out that there is no longer a team because Principal Wally disbanded the team. Principal Wally gives Cleveland a week to raise enough money to re-build the stadium before the baseball season begins.

Cleveland holds a bake sale, but does not come anywhere near the $5,000 needed. Terry shows up with a check for $120,000 that Mr. Waterman gave him (after Terry had to reach into his pocket to get it). Cleveland becomes the head coach and begins recruiting players. He tries to get Cleveland Jr. to join the team, but he states he wishes to join the Math Club instead. Cleveland runs into his old coach, Coach McFall—an alcoholic has-been who has lost part of his jaw to oral cancer after years of chewing tobacco—who gives him advice on how to get Jr. to join the team. Taking his advice, Cleveland decides to let Jr. wear his retired jersey in order to continue his legacy. Honored, Cleveland Jr. accepts and joins the team. During his first game, Cleveland Jr. is so obese that no one can pitch the ball down the middle and he is allowed to walk. However, he notices a ladybug on first base and tackles his teammate so he does not accidentally step on it and both of them are tapped out. Jr. goes on to become the team's worst player and Cleveland becomes ashamed of him.

Cleveland and Terry break into the school and steal his jersey back from Cleveland Jr. Principal Wally gives Cleveland Jr. a security tape and he finds out that Cleveland took his jersey back. Feeling ashamed, Cleveland apologizes and gives the jersey back. Heartbroken, Cleveland Jr. joins the Math Club and gives Principal Wally the jersey as he does not care anymore. As the baseball team is playing a game, Principal Wally brings Cleveland Jr. to the game. As Jr. wonders why they are there, Cleveland spots them and tries to make peace with his son again. Principal Wally then proceeds to douse Cleveland's jersey in gasoline and prepares to light it on fire as revenge for making him urinate in his pants during high school. Seeing the pain in his father's eyes in this, Cleveland Jr. tackles Principal Wally and returns the jersey to his father. Cleveland thanks him and they hug and make up. Cleveland then decides to teach Principal Wally a lesson for almost torching his jersey, as well as for calling Cleveland Jr. a "chubby loser" (to the shock of everyone attending the game), and proceeds to chase him around the field. However, after Cleveland corners Principal Wally, he once again urinates his pants, to Cleveland's delight.

== Reception ==
The episode was viewed by 6.96 million people and a rating 3.3/8 coming in third on Fox's Animation Domination and its timeslot. The A.V. Club graded the episode a C−, stating "There are some good jokes around the edges of this episode, but overall, it's gotta be considered a dud".

IGN rated this episode 8.4 Impressive and said "As a premise, the story idea might seem a bit lame, but the execution is exceptionally well done, and this episode is surprisingly one of the strongest we've seen to date. The random gags are placed perfectly here and some pretty catchy lines are uttered, including the one about wetting one's thigh and pocket contents."
