= A Brown Thanksgiving =

- The Cleveland Show episode
- Auntie Momma arrives for Thanksgiving
- Episode no.: Season 1 Episode 7
- Directed by: Chuck Klein and Matt Engstrom
- Written by: Matt Murray
- Production code: 1APS09
- Original air date: November 22, 2009

Guest appearances
- Frances Callier as Cookie Brown; Craig Robinson as LeVar "Freight Train" Brown; Hall & Oates as themselves; Kym Whitley as Auntie Momma

Episode chronology
← Previous "Ladies' Night"	Next → "From Bed to Worse"
- The Cleveland Show season 1

"A Brown Thanksgiving" is the seventh episode of the first season of the American animated television series The Cleveland Show. Written by Matt Murray and directed by Chuck Klein and Matt Engstrom, the episode originally aired on November 22, 2009 on Fox in the United States. In this episode, Cleveland Brown celebrates his first Thanksgiving with his new family, including his own parents and Donna's Auntie Momma.

== Plot ==
Cleveland celebrates Thanksgiving with his new family and his parents, Cookie and LeVar "Freight Train" Brown. Things become hostile until Donna's Auntie Momma arrives and defuses the situation. Cleveland soon discovers that Auntie Momma is a man in drag after he sees her urinating while standing. He is reluctant to tell Donna because she would be crushed to learn the truth. LeVar becomes smitten with Auntie Momma, and Cleveland, after years of LeVar being a jerk to his own son, believes it is best that his father find out the hard way. Cleveland also learns from Rallo that he had known all along from sitting on Auntie Momma's lap, and he agrees to keep quiet out of a desire to see the reaction. When LeVar and Auntie Momma come back down from having sex, they start teasing each other at dinner by subtly acting out their antics with the food. Cleveland becomes so disgusted and surprised that his father does not notice him vomiting all over the table.

Meanwhile, Roberta decides to spend a romantic Thanksgiving together with Federline, but Donna refuses to let her. Only Auntie Momma's influence convinces Donna to let her leave. As the couple kiss by a river, Federline's car is stolen by two homeless men. They track the car to a mission where the poor (including Lester's family) are eating, being served by the Bear family. The homeless man who stole the car gives back the keys. Roberta notices the unity around her and realizes that family is more important. She returns home and apologizes to her mother.

Later, Cleveland confronts Auntie Momma and learns that she is actually Donna's uncle Kevin, who was acting as a strong, female influence for Donna in place of her neglectful mother. Seeing that Cleveland will take good care of Donna, Auntie Momma decides to leave. After Auntie Momma departs by farting off on roller skates, Cleveland tells his father the truth, causing him to vomit over the front porch, before convincing him not to reveal the truth to Donna and urging him to reconcile with Cookie.

== Production ==
The episode also introduces Cleveland's father, Freight Train, who is portrayed by Craig Robinson, Cleveland's mother, Cookie, who is portrayed by Frances Callier, and Auntie Momma, who is portrayed by Kym Whitley.

== Reception ==
The episode was viewed by 6.32 million people being the third most viewed episode in its time slot. The A.V. Club's Emily VanDerWerff graded the episode a C+, stating "It's not a big deal if these shows don't want to do complicated character development (Lord knows Family Guy didn't need it), but Cleveland Show has headed in this direction so often that I was a bit disappointed the episode didn't tie all of this together better".

"A Brown Thanksgiving" came under fire from the Gay and Lesbian Alliance Against Defamation (GLAAD) after Bil Browning of the LGBT blog The Bilerico Project expressed shock at the organization's lack of response to the portrayal of a transgender character. GLAAD released a statement that it had already been in contact with Fox and the show's producers as "part of an ongoing discussion that GLAAD is having with Fox regarding consistent homophobic and transphobic jokes in some of its animated programming. The problematic transgender episode Bilerico points to is one of several instances that the Entertainment Team will be discussing with them, as well as advocating for more fair LGBT inclusion." Speaking with LGBT media website AfterElton.com in January 2010, series creator Seth MacFarlane said "It always distresses me when I hear that the gay community is upset with us, because that's one group of people I hope would know we're on their side." However, in May 2010 MacFarlane again drew GLAAD's ire when, in the Family Guy episode "Quagmire's Dad", another character (Brian) also reacts to learning he had sex with a trans woman by vomiting for close to 30 seconds.

== See also ==
- "Quagmire's Dad" – a Family Guy episode that also received negative reception for its portrayal of a transgender character
