= The One About Friends =

- The Cleveland Show episode
- Episode no.: Season 1 Episode 3
- Directed by: Oreste Canestrelli
- Written by: Jonathan Green; Gabe Miller
- Production code: 1APS04
- Original air date: October 11, 2009

Guest appearance
- Glenn Howerton as Ernie Krinklesac

Episode chronology
← Previous "Da Doggone Daddy-Daughter Dinner Dance"	Next → "Birth of a Salesman"
- The Cleveland Show season 1

"The One About Friends" is the third episode of the first season of the American animated television series The Cleveland Show. It originally aired on October 11, 2009, on Fox. In the episode, Cleveland, concerned that Cleveland Jr has no friends, invites his neighbor Lester’s son Ernie to their house. Ernie becomes attached to the family and Cleveland calls child services to have Ernie taken back home. When the plan backfires, Cleveland helps Lester get his son back.

The episode was written by Jonathan Green and Gabe Miller and directed by Oreste Canestrelli. It was viewed by approximately 7.8 million viewers in its original airing.

== Plot ==
Cleveland notices how friendless his son, Cleveland Jr. is compared to Rallo and Roberta, and sets out to find him a good friend. However, trying to find a friend for Cleveland Jr. gets a little difficult. Cleveland finds a kid for his son to play basketball with, but instead, the kid throws the basketball at Cleveland, sending him to the ground. Afterwards he runs off with Cleveland's wallet. Another negative setback happens when Cleveland asks another boy to play with Cleveland Jr., while the boy (who turns out to be an undercover cop) thinks that "Cleveland Jr." is Cleveland's nickname for his penis and assumes that he is trying to solicit sex.

Finally, Cleveland finds out that Lester's son, Ernie has no friends, which Cleveland realizes is a perfect opportunity to have his son make friends with another friendless child. It goes well, but things take a turn for the worse. Ernie leaves his family and joins the Brown family, much to their dismay. Ernie is unsanitary and disgusting, which pushes Donna to make Cleveland call child services and get Ernie back in his home.

When a child service employee shows up, he brings Ernie back to his family, but instantly takes him away after he finds out how horrific Ernie's home is. Lester finds out that Cleveland called child services on Ernie, which messes up the relationship between the two.

Cleveland decides to get Ernie back, after he finds Cleveland Jr. miserable. Lester takes Cleveland (and some of Lester's redneck buddies) to Ernie's foster home, to get him back. But negotiations quickly turn sour, before matters turn into a shootout, but the foster parents are armed to the teeth. In the midst of the fight, in which most of the rednecks die, Cleveland convinces the child worker that he could check in on Ernie from time-to-time. Unfortunately, the worker was shot by a stray bullet before he could fully sign the release form, though Cleveland finishes signing for him. Though Lester has got legal custody of his son, the fosters outnumber him. Luckily, Cleveland shoots down a chandelier on them, trapping them.

Lester and Cleveland become friends again, and things end happily despite all the deaths.

Meanwhile, Holt and Tim go to Vegas. Tim, who insinuates he is on ecstasy (which he mistakes for aspirin), has a great time, while Holt begs with the bouncer to let him in, despite looking underage and leaving his ID at his mom's house.

== Reception ==
In its original broadcast on October 11, 2009, on Fox, this episode was watched by 4.32 million U.S. viewers and acquired a 6.3/10 rating/share.

The A.V. Club graded the episode a B−, stating "Cleveland still seems like kind of an unobtrusive person to build a show around, but if he’s quietly involving himself in the lives of the people in his neighborhood, he could prove to be a good lead".
