= From Bed to Worse (disambiguation) =

From Bed to Worse may refer to:

- "From Bed to Worse" (The Cleveland Show), a 2009 episode of The Cleveland Show
- From Bed to Worse (The Ant and the Aardvark), a 1971 cartoon of The Ant and the Aardvark

== See also ==
- "From Bad to Worse", an episode of the TV series Adventure Time
