= The Cleveland Show season 1 =

The Cleveland Show
- Season 1
- DVD cover
- No. of episodes: 21

Release
- Original network: Fox
- Original release: September 27, 2009 – May 23, 2010

Season chronology
- Next → Season 2

The first season of The Cleveland Show aired from September 27, 2009, to May 23, 2010. Production of the 21 episode season began in May 2008 and was expected to begin broadcast in January 2009 but was later pushed back to September 2009.

== Cast ==
- Mike Henry as Cleveland Brown, Rallo Tubbs, and Oliver Wilkerson
- Sanaa Lathan as Donna Tubbs-Brown
- Kevin Michael Richardson as Cleveland Brown Jr. and Lester Krinklesac
- Nia Long (episodes 1–13) and Reagan Gomez Preston (episodes 14–21) as Roberta Tubbs
- Seth MacFarlane as Tim the Bear, Peter Griffin, and Glenn Quagmire
- Alex Borstein as Haddasah Löwenstein
- Corey Holcomb as Robert Tubbs
- Arianna Huffington as Arianna the Bear
- Jamie Kennedy as Federline Jones
- Jason Sudeikis as Holt Ritcher and Terry Kimple
- John Viener as himself, Kyle, and Gordy
- Aseem Batra as Kendra Krinklesac
- Alec Sulkin as himself and Angus
- Glenn Howerton as Ernie Krinklesac
- Bruce McGill as Lloyd Waterman
- Will Forte as Principal Wally Farquhare
- Frances Callier as Cookie Brown
- Craig Robinson as LeVarr Freight Train Brown
- Kym Whitley as Auntie Momma
- Nat Faxon as Raymond the Bear
- Al Thompson as Walt
- Stockard Channing as Lydia Waterman
- David Lynch as Gus
- Kanye West as Kenny West

== Episodes ==
No. overall	No. in season	Title	Directed by	Written by	Original release date	Prod. code	U.S. viewers (millions)
1	1	"Pilot"	Anthony Lioi	Seth MacFarlane, Richard Appel & Mike Henry	September 27, 2009	1APS01	9.51
After having his house damaged by Peter once again, Cleveland Brown and Cleveland Jr decide to leave Quahog and head to California to pursue his dream of being a minor league scout for a professional baseball organization. While passing through his hometown of Stoolbend, Virginia he bumps into his old flame, Donna Tubbs. She invites him to stay at her house for a couple of days, where Donna relays to Cleveland how she needs a father figure around for her kids after splitting with her ex-husband, Robert. While at Donna's house, he is introduced to Rallo and Roberta, Donna's kids, and the neighbors, including the local redneck and the family of bears, which include father Tim, his wife, and son Raymond.
2	2	"Da Doggone Daddy-Daughter Dinner Dance"	Chuck Klein	Julius Sharpe	October 4, 2009	1APS02	8.86
Cleveland tries to make inroads with his new stepdaughter Roberta by asking her to accompany him to the school's father/daughter dance. Last year Robert did not show up. The evening seems to be going smoothly until Cleveland runs over the family pet on his way to get an ice cream cake for celebration. Then his redneck neighbor Lester takes it and eats it. This kills his chances of being accepted by his new kids. Rallo and Cleveland look for meadowlark lemon and Cleveland dives in nasty places looking to keep the secret but Lester and the others tell him to be honest.
3	3	"The One About Friends"	Oreste Canestrelli	Jonathan Green & Gabe Miller	October 11, 2009	1APS04	7.87
Cleveland notices his son, Cleveland Jr. has no friends, and sets out to find him a good friend. He finds out that Lester's son, Ernie, has no friends, which Cleveland realizes is a perfect opportunity to have his son make friends with another friendless child. It goes well, but things take a turn for the worse. Ernie leaves his family and joins the Brown family, much to their dismay. Ernie is unsanitary and disgusting, which pushes Donna to make Cleveland call child services and get Ernie back in his home.
4	4	"Birth of a Salesman"	Chris Graham & Anthony Lioi	Kirker Butler	October 18, 2009	1APS03	7.62
Cleveland looks for a job, first trying to be a grizzled police officer two days from retirement and also as a singing salesman at the Stoolbend Flea Market. Tim helps him get a job at Waterman Cable as a phone solicitor. Cleveland runs into an old high-school friend, Terry Kimple who is working as a cable installer for Waterman. When they were in school, Terry took the rap when they were busted for drugs. When Cleveland excels as a salesman, causing business to dry up for Tim, Tim prays for bad things to happen to Cleveland. Meanwhile, Roberta and Rallo feel resentment towards Cleveland Jr. for stealing their mother's affections from them and try to make him look bad until they learn the true extent of his feelings towards his own mother.
5	5	"Cleveland Jr.'s Cherry Bomb"	Mike L. Mayfield	Aseem Batra	November 8, 2009	1APS08	6.44
While watching a baseball game at Stoolbend Stadium, Cleveland sees Roberta kissing with Federline Jones. Cleveland tries to talk to Roberta about maintaining her virginity but while she admits she has yet to do anything, makes it clear that it is none of his business. Following the advice of his friends, he takes the family to church to hear about maintaining purity. Cleveland Jr. gets carried away in the moment and pledges his purity to Cleveland's dismay.
6	6	"Ladies' Night"	Justin Ridge	Clarence Livingston	November 15, 2009	1APS07	7.13
Cleveland and Donna get together with the neighbors, but while Cleveland is enjoying himself, Donna is less than thrilled and gives Cleveland the cold shoulder. When invited to spend more times with the neighbors, Donna decided to sneak out and spend more time with her old friends at a single mothers gathering. Getting away from Cleveland helps spark the relationship. Cleveland finds out that she was not spending time with the other wives but gets distracted. While on a day out tubing down a river with the kids, Cleveland stumbles across Donna and her friends who are shocked to find out she is married.
7	7	"A Brown Thanksgiving"	Chuck Klein & Matt Engstrom	Matt Murray	November 22, 2009	1APS09	6.56
Cleveland celebrates his first Thanksgiving with his new family. His parents, Cookie Brown and Levar 'Freight Train' Brown arrive for Thanksgiving. Cleveland's dismal relationship with his father nearly lands him in a fight with his own father, until Donna's Auntie Momma shows up. She starts making comments on how outrageous she is after farting. Freight Train gains an infatuation over Auntie Momma and decides to have sex with her after a game of football. However, when Cleveland was taking out the garbage, he saw Auntie Momma in the bathroom, with a penis. Despite that Freight Train had sex with Auntie Momma (who secretly is a man), he did not even know about it.
8	8	"From Bed to Worse"	Anthony Agrusa	Teri Schaffer & Raynelle Swilling	November 29, 2009	1APS05	7.17
Rallo becomes upset because Cleveland has taken over the house. While telling his friends about his troubles he decides it has to be either him or Cleveland. He plots to come between his mother and Cleveland, temporarily driving Cleveland from the bedroom. When Donna tries to reason with him, Rallo escalates the conflict by breaking his own leg, sending Donna on a one-way guilt trip. Cleveland tries to talk with him and discovers just how far Rallo would go. When Rallo discovers how much his mother misses Cleveland he agrees to a truce.
9	9	"A Cleveland Brown Christmas"	Oreste Canestrelli	Jonathan Green & Gabe Miller	December 13, 2009	1APS11	6.53
Cleveland and the family go to pick out a Christmas tree at Lester's lot. Cleveland has his eye on a nice large tree but Rallo insists on a smaller tree. Cleveland finds out that Donna and the family have been lying to Rallo, telling him the reason Robert cannot come around during the holidays is that he is an FBI agent. When Cleveland fills in as Santa Claus at his office holiday party, he has one too many egg nogs and lets the truth slip about Rallo's father. Rallo fails to connect that it was Cleveland posing as Santa and takes out his hostility on the figure of Santa. With Rallo's admiration for his dad destroyed, Cleveland tries to reconnect father and son in an attempt to save Rallo's Christmas spirit.
10	10	"Field of Streams"	Ian Graham	Aaron Lee	January 3, 2010	1APS06	6.94
After a nostalgic flashback to the glory days as his high school's baseball all-star, Cleveland visits his alma mater to find out there is no longer a team because he and his friends insulted Wally as a teen. Now Principal Wally gives Cleveland one week to raise money to re-build the stadium before the season begins. They raise the cash from a generous donation by Mr. Waterman and organize the team on time. Cleveland then steps in as head coach and dusts off his retired jersey in an attempt to convince Cleveland Jr. to play ball instead of joining the math club. Cleveland Jr. turns out to have no skills, even going as far as deliberately interfering with a play to save a ladybug.
11	11	"Love Rollercoaster"	Ron Rubio	Kirker Butler	January 10, 2010	1APS10	8.54
Cleveland Jr. is building a model rocket for the school science fair. Roberta's new teacher, Ms. Eck challenges Roberta to prove she can get by without her looks and has her alter her appearance by wearing a 'fat suit'. Her first day as 'Tyra' gets off in an inauspicious start when she is rejected by Federline and the teachers she previously had wrapped around her finger. Cleveland Jr. sees her alone in the cafeteria and warms up to her. When he shows her his model rocket, which is not only failing but is being outmatched by the geeks who are translating Klingon, she helps him with the design flaw. They win the science fair - probably because of the TIE fighters the rocket deployed to attack the geeks - and Ms. Eck gives Roberta and A Grade for proving she more than just looks.
12	12	"Our Gang"	Anthony Agrusa	Aaron Lee	January 31, 2010	1APS12	4.50
When the worst kids in the school go too far and Principal Wally expels the group, Coach Cleveland comes to the rescue by taking a group of delinquent teens under his wing. In an effort to teach them life skills, he proposes they go into business making and selling cookies. The kids however, misinterpret his baking terms for drugs and start dealing. Business is good until another gang takes over the area, stealing the drugs and money from the Crazy Eights. Cleveland rushes in to steal back the goods still believing them to be cookies. When he finds out they are drugs, he destroys them by flushing them down the toilet but faces a demand to return them or lose Cleveland Jr. who was captured. Cleveland rallies the Crazy Eights but becomes endangered himself.
13	13	"Buried Pleasure"	Ian Graham	Julius Sharpe	February 14, 2010	1APS13	4.87
At Stoolfest, a local community festival, Cleveland calls Holt to tell him of a concert. He finds Holt out shopping with his mother and unable to go. Later that night at The Broken Stool, the guys tell Holt he is too accommodating to his mother's wishes. When Donna sees Holt in a rage from their bedroom, she shows Cleveland and when they see Holt rolling up a figure in a carpet and take it away they assume Holt killed his mother. Cleveland helps the police set up a police sting operation and get Holt to show them where he buried the body...a sex doll that Holt decided he needed to get away from. Holt admits to Cleveland he has not had luck with real women and they set Holt up with Jane, a girl from the Waterman Cable office.
14	14	"The Curious Case of Jr. Working at The Stool"	Justin Ridge	Kevin Biggins & Travis Bowe	February 21, 2010	1APS14	5.58
When Cleveland admires Lester's new hat, Lester mentions that his son Ernie bought it for him with the money he earned on his new job at the slaughterhouse. When Cleveland Jr. asks for a new bike, Cleveland believes it is time for him to learn some responsibility by earning the money himself. Attempts to find work at the slaughterhouse and the local paper fail to pan out. While Cleveland takes Jr. to The Broken Stool to get himself a drink. Cleveland Jr.'s compulsion to clean and organize kicks in when he sees the mess around him and he straightens things out in short order. After also impressing Stool bartender Gus with his business acumen, Jr. is hired. Jr. quickly kills Cleveland and the gangs buzz when he reveals that Gus never kept the books on their tab but now he is. Meanwhile, Roberta competes with Lacey, a rich high school student. Note: Starting with this episode, Roberta is now voiced by Reagan Gomez-Preston.
15	15	"Once Upon a Tyne in New York"	Mike L. Mayfield	Aaron Lee	March 21, 2010	1APS16	5.07
When Donna is not thrilled by married life, Cleveland reveals that he and Donna have not yet taken their honeymoon. When soliciting ideas from the gang, Coach McFall reveals his former fling with Tyne Daly in New York City. Inspired, Cleveland takes Donna on a road trip to the Big Apple, and to Donna's dismay, Cleveland allows the Stoolbend gang to tag along while the kids are left with Terry. The next morning, Donna and Cleveland try to enjoy their time while the rest of the gang wander off but they soon get into trouble, requiring Cleveland to come to the rescue and break off his day with Donna. Cleveland tries to make it up by taking Donna to a Broadway show but it is a cover for helping Coach McFall reunite with Tyne Daly. When Coach McFall actually meets Tyne Daly, they find his breakup was not exactly under pleasant circumstances. Frustrated with being neglected by Cleveland, she leaves and returns to the hotel bar.
16	16	"The Brown Knight"	Matt Engstrom	Aseem Batra	March 28, 2010	1APS17	5.64
After a stressful day at the school, Donna comes home and is in no mood for Cleveland's shenanigans. At The Broken Stool, the guys tease Cleveland about Donna running things. When he confronts Donna, she admits she had to develop a take-charge attitude to survive being a single mom but agrees to lighten up a little for Cleveland. At an ATM, a robber attempts to take their money and Donna's wedding ring. While Donna struggles with the thief to protect her ring, Cleveland runs around helplessly. When the thief's gun goes off and Cleveland is shot, Donna feels horrible and agrees to restrain herself more for Cleveland.
17	17	"Gone With the Wind"	Ron Rubio	Bill Oakley	April 11, 2010	1APS18	5.50
When Cleveland is diagnosed with high cholesterol, Donna puts him on a new high-fiber diet, which causes an intestinal backlash. When it begins to affect his work, he goes to see Dr. Fist who gives him a written note card explaining that he has a medical condition which he soon takes advantage of. Cleveland quickly realizes his gas might score him a few points in the Broken Stool's karaoke contest. Donna is appalled that Cleveland should resort to such disgusting behavior but they are interrupted by a call that brings news of Loretta's death. Cleveland's old friend Quagmire from Quahog arrives with the body and explains that she was accidentally killed by the bathtub falling out of the damaged house gag – which Cleveland had survived numerous times on Family Guy – when Peter tried to decorate his and Lois' bedroom with a brachiosaurus skeleton Brian dug up, but unintentionally dropped his hardhat on a lever, causing the crane to lose control and slam the skeleton onto Loretta's house. Worried for Cleveland Jr., they try to break the news gently and find he has already put his mother's death behind him. Cleveland's survivor's guilt over having many times survived the same accident that killed Loretta causes Cleveland to break down for a while, until he realizes exactly why he was so upset. Donna and he then win the karaoke competition.
18	18	"Brotherly Love"	Anthony Agrusa	Justin Heimberg	May 2, 2010	1APS20	5.78
Acting as his brother's wingman, Rallo gives Cleveland Jr. a few pointers on how to win over the girl of his dreams, Chanel. Although when Cleveland Jr. finds out that her boyfriend is local rap star Kenny West. Cleveland Jr challenges Kenny to a rap battle to win Chanel's heart. Meanwhile, during a cable installation, Cleveland and Terry somehow get mistaken for male strippers and decide to make a new career out of it. But not if Donna has anything to say about it.
19	19	"Brown History Month"	Ian Graham	Matt Murray	May 9, 2010	1APS21	5.30
Cleveland and Cleveland Jr. teach Donna and the kids their tradition of celebrating Black History Month. However, when Rallo learns about his heritage at school, he provokes Cleveland into a battle royale with neighbor, Lester.
20	20	"Cleveland's Angels"	Oreste Canestrelli	Clarence Livingston	May 16, 2010	1APS19	5.86
After Cleveland gambles away Roberta's college fund, Kendra discovers that Cleveland was actually cheated out of his money and recruits Donna and Arianna for a "Cleveland's Angels" mission.
21	21	"You're the Best Man, Cleveland Brown"	Justin Ridge	Kirker Butler	May 23, 2010	1APS22	4.94
Cleveland finds out that Cleveland Jr. will inherit all of his ex-wife's belongings and that his parents, Cookie and Freight Train, plan to remarry. To add insult to injury, Freight Train dumps Cleveland as his best man in favor of Donna's ex-husband, Robert.

== Reception ==
The season started off with mediocre to above average reviews. On the series premiere IGN wrote "While it seems to be missing some of the over-the-top offensive bite we're used to on Family Guy, and Cleveland's new drinking buddies aren't quite as amusing as the Quagmire, Joe and Peter combination - there's a lot to like here. It might take a while for the show to grow out of its Family Guy shadow, but with a greater focus on wacky family focused stories, we might get to see much personality burst out of the normally sedate Cleveland."

For the following episodes reviews were generally positive as well. Episode 2 received a 7/10, although IGN mentioned "[the show] hasn't really shown any signs of innovation or desire to stray too far from the well-established Family Guy comedic formula", while the third episode, "The One About Friends", shared similar criticisms such as "This show still seems to be trying to find its way, and without a memorable supporting cast like we have on Family Guy, it will be hard to see how this show can make it with only Cleveland's sedated humor."

On Rotten Tomatoes, the series received a 44%, the consensus reading, The Cleveland Show is simply not interesting enough to capture the same comedic lightning of Seth MacFarlane's Family Guy.

Review grades
#	Title	Air date	The A.V. Club (A-F)
1	"Pilot"	September 27, 2009	C-
2	"Da Doggone Daddy-Daughter Dinner Dance"	October 4, 2009	B
3	"The One About Friends"	October 11, 2009	B-
4	"Birth of a Salesman"	October 18, 2009	C
5	"Cleveland Jr.'s Cherry Bomb"	November 8, 2009	B
6	"Ladies' Night"	November 15, 2009	B
7	"A Brown Thanksgiving"	November 22, 2009	C+
8	"From Bed to Worse"	November 29, 2009	B-
9	"A Cleveland Brown Christmas"	December 13, 2009	B
10	"Field of Streams"	January 3, 2010	C-
11	"Love Rollercoaster"	January 10, 2010	B
12	"Our Gang"	January 31, 2010	C
13	"Buried Pleasure"	February 14, 2010	C+
14	"The Curious Case of Jr. Working at The Stool"	February 21, 2010	B
15	"Once Upon a Tyne in New York"	March 21, 2010	B+
16	"The Brown Knight"	March 28, 2010	C+
17	"Gone With the Wind"	April 11, 2010	B-
18	"Brotherly Love"	May 2, 2010	B-
19	"Brown History Month"	May 9, 2010	B+
20	"Cleveland's Angels"	May 16, 2010	C+
21	"You're the Best Man, Cleveland Brown"	May 23, 2010	C

== Home media ==
The DVD was released as a "Complete Season" featuring all of the aired episodes. It was released in Region 1 on September 28, 2010 and was released in Region 2 on October 11, 2010.

The Complete Season One
Set Details		Special Features
21 episodes; 4-disc set; Widescreen: 1.78:1 ratio video; Languages: English (w/ subtitles)		Audio Commentary; Deleted Scenes; Featurette: "Meet Cleveland"; Featurette: "Get Your Sex On Music Video" by Earth, Wind & Fire featuring Cleveland Brown; Featurette: "The Making of Get Your Sex On"; Featurette: "Brotherly Love Table Read
Release Dates		Audio Commentary; Deleted Scenes; Featurette: "Meet Cleveland"; Featurette: "Get Your Sex On Music Video" by Earth, Wind & Fire featuring Cleveland Brown; Featurette: "The Making of Get Your Sex On"; Featurette: "Brotherly Love Table Read
Region 1	Region 2	Audio Commentary; Deleted Scenes; Featurette: "Meet Cleveland"; Featurette: "Get Your Sex On Music Video" by Earth, Wind & Fire featuring Cleveland Brown; Featurette: "The Making of Get Your Sex On"; Featurette: "Brotherly Love Table Read
September 28, 2010	October 11, 2010	Audio Commentary; Deleted Scenes; Featurette: "Meet Cleveland"; Featurette: "Get Your Sex On Music Video" by Earth, Wind & Fire featuring Cleveland Brown; Featurette: "The Making of Get Your Sex On"; Featurette: "Brotherly Love Table Read
