= Herbert (Family Guy) =

Fictional character from the Family Guy franchise

John Herbert
- Family Guy character
- First appearance: "To Love and Die in Dixie" (2001)
- Created by: Seth MacFarlane; Steve Callaghan; Mike Henry
- Designed by: Seth MacFarlane
- Voiced by: Mike Henry

In-universe information
- Full name: John Herbert
- Gender: Male
- Relatives: Sandy (great-niece)
- Nationality: American

John Herbert, nicknamed "Herbert the Pervert", is a fictional character in the animated television series Family Guy, created and voiced by Mike Henry. Herbert is an elderly neighbor of the Griffin family who first appeared in the season 3 episode "To Love and Die in Dixie". He is a pedophile and hebephile who is attracted to young boys, and he harbors unrequited love for Chris Griffin.

Herbert has received mixed reviews from critics, who have expressed varying opinions on the pedophilia-related humor involving the character. Herbert has appeared in various Family Guy merchandise and has made several crossover appearances in The Cleveland Show, a Family Guy spin-off.

== Role in Family Guy ==
Herbert lives in the fictional town of Quahog, Rhode Island, which is modeled after Cranston, Rhode Island. He is a single elderly man who dresses in a baby blue bathrobe and utilizes a walker due to his age; his dog Jesse is equally elderly and decrepit, being unable to use his hind legs. In the episode And Then There Were Fewer, Herbert claims to be a frequent watcher of NCIS and CBS as he claims they “get [his] generation”. During the same discussion, he claims to be a fan of comedian Jay Leno: noting he is glad Leno returned as the host of Late Night and deriding Conan O’Brien as a “month-old Jack O’Lantern”, further claiming he “didn’t get his brand of humor”. In his first appearance, "To Love and Die in Dixie" (season 3, 2001), Herbert attempts to seduce Chris inside the house by offering him a popsicle that Herbert insists is in his basement. Despite his pleas, Chris refuses the offer. In "Peter, Peter, Pumpkin Cheater" it is confirmed that Herbert is indeed a sex offender: as he claims to visit his neighbors annually on Halloween to introduce himself as such, announcing "Trick or Treat! I'm a registered sex offender!".

In "The Courtship of Stewie's Father" (season 4, 2005), Chris breaks Herbert's window with a baseball and Chris assists Herbert with chores around his house in attempts to pay off the debt, much to Herbert's delight. Herbert later invites Chris to dinner wherein a souvenir photograph of the pair is taken. In "Play It Again, Brian" (season 6, 2008), Herbert is hired by Peter and Lois to babysit their children Chris, Stewie and Meg. Herbert accepts the offer, claiming he will wear his "snazziest duds", erupting into the song "All I Need is the Girl" (though modified to reflect his unrequited affection for Chris). He claims to have no interest in Meg in large part due to her age and gender, and is disappointed when she is the only one of the three to bathe him: becoming visibly frustrated and exclaiming "aw, rats!" whilst Meg bathes him. Herbert has a grand-niece, Sandy, whom he helps attract Chris in the style of Cyrano de Bergerac in "Valentine's Day in Quahog" (season 11, 2013).

It is later revealed in "Movin' Out (Brian's Song)" (season 6, 2007) that Chris is aware of Herbert's attraction towards him, asking Herbert candidly if he is a "pedophile" after Herbert reads him a bedtime story. Herbert's response, if any, is not shown.

Although Herbert is often seen in pursuit of Chris Griffin, he makes frequent passes at other underage boys: typically of similar age to Chris. Some examples of this attracting to other local boys include season 3 episode 8 "From Method to Madness" where Herbert announces that "It must be [his] birthday!" when a young male nudist walks by him in a shopping mall, and season 19 episode 13 "Peterminator", wherein he is seen singing the Guns n' Roses song "Sweet Child o' Mine" for a boy he refers to as "Nathan M". Additionally, when Chris gets a new job in "Movin' Out (Brian's Song)" (season 6, 2007), his younger brother Stewie takes over his paper route with Herbert attempting to seduce him much in the same way as he does towards Chris, but is rebuffed by Stewie, who refers to Herbert as a "perverted old freak", insisting he should "piss off" though this only furthers his lust for the infant.

In "Padre de Familia" (season 6, 2007), Herbert is revealed to have been a World War II veteran as he is shown singing "God Bless the USA" in a local Veterans Day parade whilst wearing a dress uniform. Herbert claims to have received a Purple Heart during his time in the military, and offers to show it to various children, though the veracity of this claim is uncertain. This is furthered in the season 9 (2011) episode "German Guy" in which Herbert reveals he was captured by Wehrmacht forces. Herbert claims that, although the Nazi forces initially wished to place Herbert in a prisoner-of-war camp, they instead placed him in Dachau Concentration Camp after discovering several pictures of underage boys in his wallet, prompting them to accuse him of being homosexual. Herbert claims that while imprisoned, SS Lieutenant Franz Schlechtnacht tasked him with sorting the concentration camp's recyclables, which would often lead to soda spilling upon Herbert's hands thus rendering them "kinda sticky", traumatizing the veteran. Herbert later battles Lieutenant Schlechtnacht after the latter takes Chris hostage.

As part of a running gag in the episode "Family Guy Through the Years" (season 16, 2018), Herbert repeatedly introduces himself to the Griffin family, and dispels rumors of his identity, clarifying he is not "Roy Mitchel": a man who Herbert claims was accused of "all sorts of things" in a neighboring town. It is also highly implied that Herbert raped Chris's father Peter, as in season 12 episode 12: "Mom's the Word", Peter states that he was with his uncle Roy, a nod to Roy Mitchell, and that Roy (Herbert) gave Peter drugged water and then Peter woke up with his pants off, and that it turned out that they weren't even related.

Herbert possesses supernatural abilities as is seen in season 17 episode 8: "Con Heiress", when he explodes in delight upon discovering a sexually suggestive fight between Chris Griffin and his father Peter, with Chris commenting that Herbert has frequently spoken of his desire to "explode all over [him]". Following Herbert's explosion, his dog Jesse grabs a piece of Herbert and plants it in a small pot to regrow him, restoring him to a small plant-like state reminiscent of the Marvel character Groot. In this state, Herbert is only able to recite the words "I am Herbert" in homage to the aforementioned Marvel character.

Herbert has appeared on various occasions in Family Guy spin-off show The Cleveland Show. Herbert appears five times throughout the series, although his appearances are largely delegated to flashback sequences, such as when Cleveland Jr. recalls Herbert placing a bowl of candy upon his penis during Halloween, attempting to become aroused by the various local youths reaching into the bowl to procure candy. He has also appeared in non-flashback sequences, for instance singing "Silent Night" to a group of children.

In Laugh It Up, Fuzzball: The Family Guy Trilogy, Herbert appears as Obi-Wan Kenobi.

== Production ==
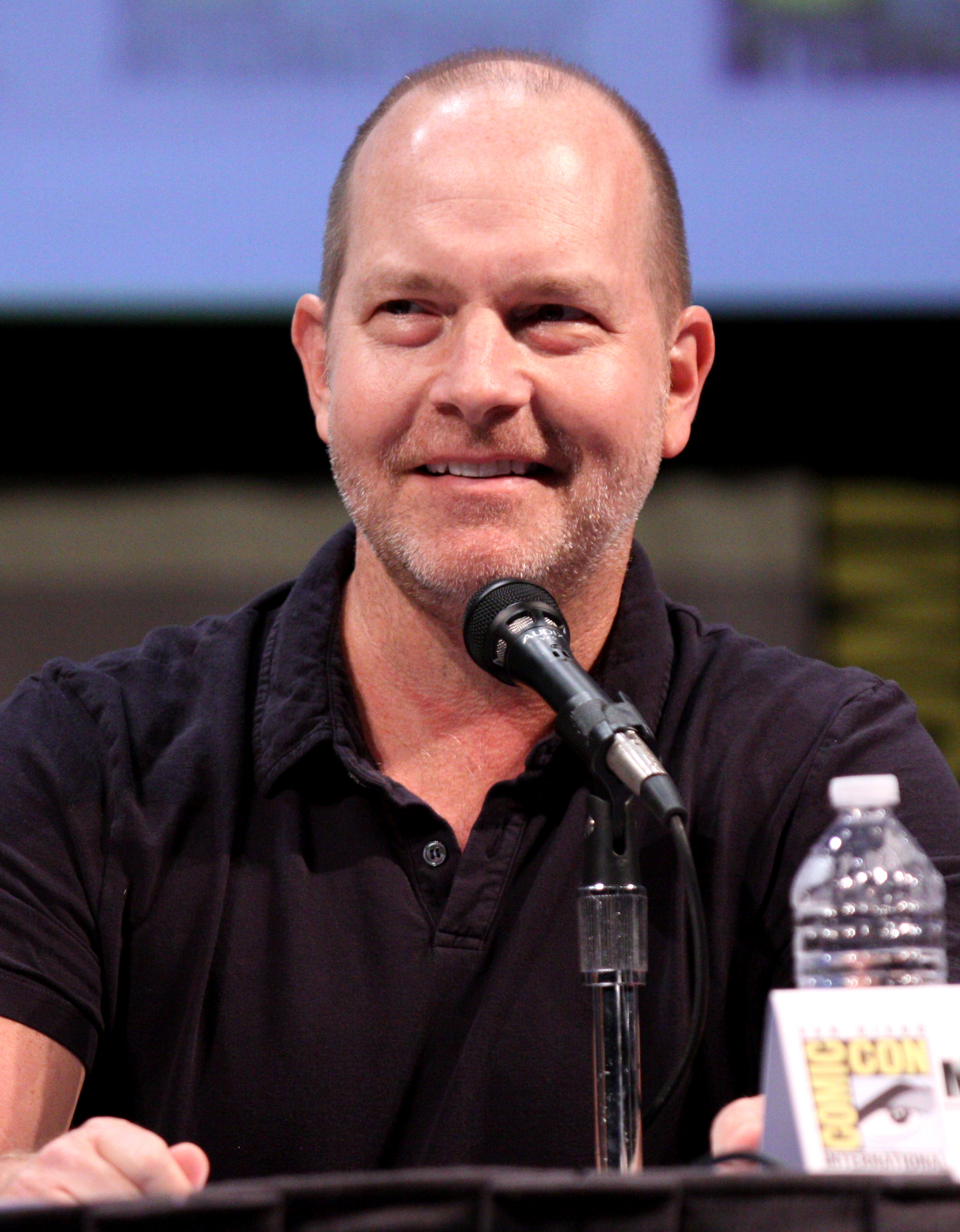
Mike Henry created Herbert and provides his voice.

Herbert was created by writer and voice actor Mike Henry. Henry met Family Guy creator Seth MacFarlane when his brother Patrick was a classmate of MacFarlane's at the Rhode Island School of Design. Henry was invited to write and create characters for Family Guy after the show was picked up. The first character he created was Cleveland Brown, and he later created Herbert.

In the creation process, Herbert was not originally a pedophile; Henry pitched the idea to the writers of the show, leading to the decision to make him one. As with most of the other characters he created, Henry voices Herbert. Henry based Herbert's voice and appearance on an elderly man he met when he worked in a grocery store when he was in high school. In an interview Henry described that man as a sweet person.

== Reception ==
IGN, an American entertainment website, has generally commented positively on him. They pointed out that Herbert is one of the most popular recurring characters in the series, referring to him (with his dog Jesse) as one of the characters that stuck out from the rest. They also noted that one of the reasons Herbert is funny is because of his "soft, high-pitched whistling voice".

"Herbert is one of the series's most popular minor characters, having appeared in an impressive 28 episodes. Part of Herbert's appeal is his ability to seamlessly integrate sexually suggestive comments into regular conversation without being noticed by authority figures".

— Ahsan Haque, IGN.

Although IGN has praised Herbert in general they have criticized some aspects of him. In their review of "Blue Harvest", a retelling and parody of the 1977 film Star Wars Episode IV: A New Hope, recasting the show's characters into Star Wars roles, IGN criticized the choice of putting Herbert in the role of Obi-Wan Kenobi, stating that it never creates any actual humor. They also criticized the constant use of Herbert, commenting that it was entertaining for the first couple of times, but that it quickly became overused. In their list of "What Else Should Family Guy Make Fun Of?", IGN commented that Herbert would be perfect to play Major Toht and Hogwarts' new Defence Against the Dark Arts instructor should Family Guy ever decide to make parodies of Raiders of the Lost Ark and Harry Potter, respectively.

A February 2015 article written by Hanh Nguyen for TV Guide listed pedophilia among the 12 biggest taboos shown on Family Guy, naming Herbert as the "creepiest of all" references to the disorder. Rowan Kaiser of The A.V. Club criticized the character as an example of how the series occasionally fails in its deliberately offensive humor. He called the character "a black hole of shittiness whose every appearance brings out the worst tendencies of Family Guy", adding that his "appearance brings every episode he's in to a screeching halt". Herbert, along with his dog Jesse, ranked spot number 16 in IGN's "Top 25 Family Guy Characters". Herbert also ranked number five on IGN's "The Cleveland Show Casting Couch", which showed characters that IGN would find interesting to put in The Cleveland Show.

== Merchandise ==
In 2004, the first series of Family Guy toy figurines was released by Mezco Toyz. Each member of the Griffin family and other characters (including Herbert) had their own toy, with the exception of Stewie, of whom two different figures were made. Over the course of two years, four more series of toy figures have been released. Herbert is also featured on the Family Guy: Live in Vegas CD.

== See also ==
- List of characters in Family Guy
