= Love Rollercoaster (The Cleveland Show) =

- The Cleveland Show episode
- Episode no.: Season 1 Episode 11
- Directed by: Ron Rubio
- Written by: Kirker Butler
- Production code: 1APS10
- Original air date: January 10, 2010

Guest appearances
- Lucas Grabeel as Nerd #2; Jane Lynch as Ms. Eck; Scottie Pippen as himself; Chuck Woolery as himself

Episode chronology
← Previous "Field of Streams"	Next → "Our Gang"
- The Cleveland Show season 1

"Love Rollercoaster" is the eleventh episode of the first season of the American adult animated sitcom The Cleveland Show. Written by Kirker Butler and directed by Ron Rubio, it originally aired on January 10, 2010, on Fox. In this episode, Roberta learns a lesson about looks.

== Plot ==
Cleveland Jr. is building a model rocket for the school science fair which wins him first place. Roberta's new teacher, Ms. Eck (voiced by Jane Lynch) challenges Roberta to prove she can get by without her looks and has her alter her appearance by wearing a 'fat suit'. Her first day as 'Tyra' gets off in an inauspicious start when she is rejected by Federline and the teachers she previously had wrapped around her finger. Cleveland Jr. sees her alone in the cafeteria and warms up to her. When he shows her his model rocket, which is not only failing but is being outmatched by the geeks who are translating Klingon, she helps him with the design flaw. They win the science fair - probably because of the TIE fighters the rocket deployed to attack the geeks - and Ms. Eck gives Roberta an 'A' Grade for proving she has more than just looks. However, Cleveland Jr. falls in love with Roberta and when he tricks her into meeting the family while disguised as Tyra she has to admit her actions. Cleveland tells her she has to figure a way out of her predicament. She invents a story about moving to Alaska to avoid breaking Cleveland Jr.'s heart.

Meanwhile, Cleveland and the guys impressed by Holt's new 'Nasal Laser', set out to invent the next infomercial product. After bouncing ideas around they decide that a movable coaster for beers is just the item they need. The guys try to shut Cleveland out of his preferred name of the 'Roller Coaster' in favor of the 'Brew-Choo Train'. Cleveland decides to make their booth sign at the invention show using the name he prefers and is kicked out of the group. The guys show up and they tell him the invention already exists and they are being sued. It turns out he saw an ad on late night television while high and had forgotten about it. He gloats at first about the guys getting stuck with the lawsuit until they reveal they never took his name off the invention and HE is the one being sued. He gets off due to some legal maneuvering but comes up with a new idea...based on an invention he had seen earlier at the invention show. He is told he should lay off the weed.

== Reception ==
The episode was viewed by 8.549 million viewers with an 18–49 rating of 4.2/10, making it the second most-viewed episode in its timeslot, but least viewed episode on FOX that night after The Simpsons and The Simpsons 20th Anniversary Special – In 3-D! On Ice!.

Emily VanDerWerff of The A.V. Club gave the episode a positive review, and especially praised Cleveland Jr.'s storyline, writing "there are times when I'll laugh at something Cleveland, Jr., says just because of the delivery of the line. It's a great voice, for one, but it's also coming from the one character the show seems to have completely thought out". Jason Hughes of TV Squad wrote that Jane Lynch was "woefully under-utilized", but praised Cleveland Jr.'s song. Ahsan Haque of IGN wrote that the storyline with Roberta and Cleveland Jr. "could have been handled in a crude lowbrow fashion" but instead it took "a nice heartwarming turn" He called the "Balls Deep" song "the strongest and catchiest musical number we've seen on the show so far" and rated the episode 8.6 out of 10.
