= Harder, Better, Faster, Browner =

- The Cleveland Show episode
- Episode no.: Season 2 Episode 1
- Directed by: Ian Graham
- Written by: Matt Murray
- Production code: 2APS06
- Original air date: September 26, 2010

Guest appearances
- Keke Palmer as Brandi; Kanye West as Kenny West

Episode chronology
← Previous "You're the Best Man, Cleveland Brown"	Next → "Cleveland Live!"

"Harder, Better, Faster, Browner" is the second season premiere of the American animated comedy series The Cleveland Show, and the 22nd episode overall. It originally aired on Fox on September 26, 2010. The title is a parody of the song "Harder, Better, Faster, Stronger" by French house duo Daft Punk.

In this episode, Cleveland attempts to get Kenny West's rap career off the ground, while President Barack Obama pays Stoolbend a visit. The episode was written by Matt Murray and directed by Ian Graham. It features a guest performance by Kanye West (who sampled "Harder, Better, Faster, Stronger" in his song "Stronger"). It received mostly mixed-to-positive reviews from critics for its storyline and many cultural references. According to Nielsen ratings, it was viewed in 6.02 million homes in its original airing. The episode featured guest performances by Kanye West and Keke Palmer, along with several recurring guest voice actors for the series.

== Plot ==
When Cleveland beats Rallo and his friends in a basketball game, he reminisces about his childhood playing days including beating a kid named Barry Obama whom Donna informs him is now President Barack Obama. Cleveland takes the news hard, wondering what he has done with his life. When he runs into Kenny West dropping his daughter Candice off at Rallo's school, he invites him to drop her off for a play date which Kenny agrees to do that afternoon, as he has other business to attend to. When Kenny brings Candice over, Rallo is thrilled to see her. When Cleveland forgets that Kenny will pick Candice up, Candice shows Cleveland where he works; As a server in a rap-themed restaurant. Cleveland also finds out they have been living in Kenny's car and invites them to move into the garage in a gesture intended to show up Barack Obama. Kenny decides to sell his rap recording equipment and becomes a cable installer like Cleveland. Rallo is thrilled with Candice's attention until she slowly becomes pushy. Kenny's emulation of Cleveland reaches the point of growing a mustache and even looking like him after Cleveland loans him a shirt. Donna makes Cleveland see that he has taken Kenny out of his element and Cleveland buys back all of Kenny's recording equipment and they write a new song. At first they have no luck in promoting their new song, but when a little girl named Brandi falls down a well they rush off to perform a benefit concert and their song is well received, and garners extra attention when, during a post-performance interview, Cleveland says "Barack Obama doesn't care about black people", causing Twitter to literally explode from the amount of tweets sent about the incident. When they reach success, Kenny fires Cleveland. On a date with Candice, Walt and another friend of Candice, Rallo has had enough of Candice's attitude and leaves the girls behind at a restaurant with every other guy in the place. Cleveland tells Donna about being fired by Kenny, but just then President Obama's helicopter lands on the front lawn and Obama challenges Cleveland to a game of basketball which he wins and then departs. Donna tries to jump on board but is kicked off by the secret service.

== Production ==
The episode was written by series regular Matt Murray and directed by series regular Ian Graham shortly after the conclusion of the first production season.

In addition to the regular cast, rapper Kanye West portrayed Kenny West for the second time. Actress Keke Palmer portrayed Candice.

President Obama is voiced by series regular Kevin Michael Richardson (who voices Cleveland Jr. and Lester Krinklesac).

== Reception ==
The Simpsons' 3.7 adults 18-49 rating was down 14% from last season's premiere (9/27/09). The Cleveland Show's 3.1 rating was down 37% from its series premiere last season. Family Guy's 4.5 rating lead the night, but was down 15% vs. last season's premiere.

Emily VanDerWerff of The A.V. Club graded the episode a B, stating "I laughed quite a few times at it, enjoying the idea that Cleveland had played basketball against a young Barack Obama (and the fact that the show's Obama is kind of an asshole on the court) and the performance of Kanye West as Kenny West. But none of those laughs graduated from mild chuckles. It was all clever, but none of it was inspired. The Cleveland Show, more than any other show in the animated bloc, feels assembled by a joke-writing committee, and that hurts it, even in a pretty good episode like this one".
