= Mike Henry (voice actor) =

American voice actor

- Henry in 2026
- Born: Michael Robert Henry; November 7, 1965 (age 61); Pontiac, Michigan, U.S.
- Education: Collegiate School
- Alma mater: Washington and Lee University (BA)
- Occupations: Voice actor; comedian; writer; animator
- Years active: 1989–present
- Spouses: Linda Murray (m. 2002; div. 2005) Sara Voelker (m. 2007)
- Children: 2
- Website: mikehenryofficial.com

Michael Robert Henry (born November 7, 1965) is an American voice actor, comedian, writer, and animator. He is known for his work on Family Guy, where he was a writer, producer, and the voice actor of Cleveland Brown (until 2021), Herbert, Bruce, Consuela, the Greased-up Deaf Guy, and others. He co-created and starred in the spin-off The Cleveland Show (2009–13), for which he voiced the titular character and Rallo Tubbs, among others. He also had a recurring role as Dann in The Orville.

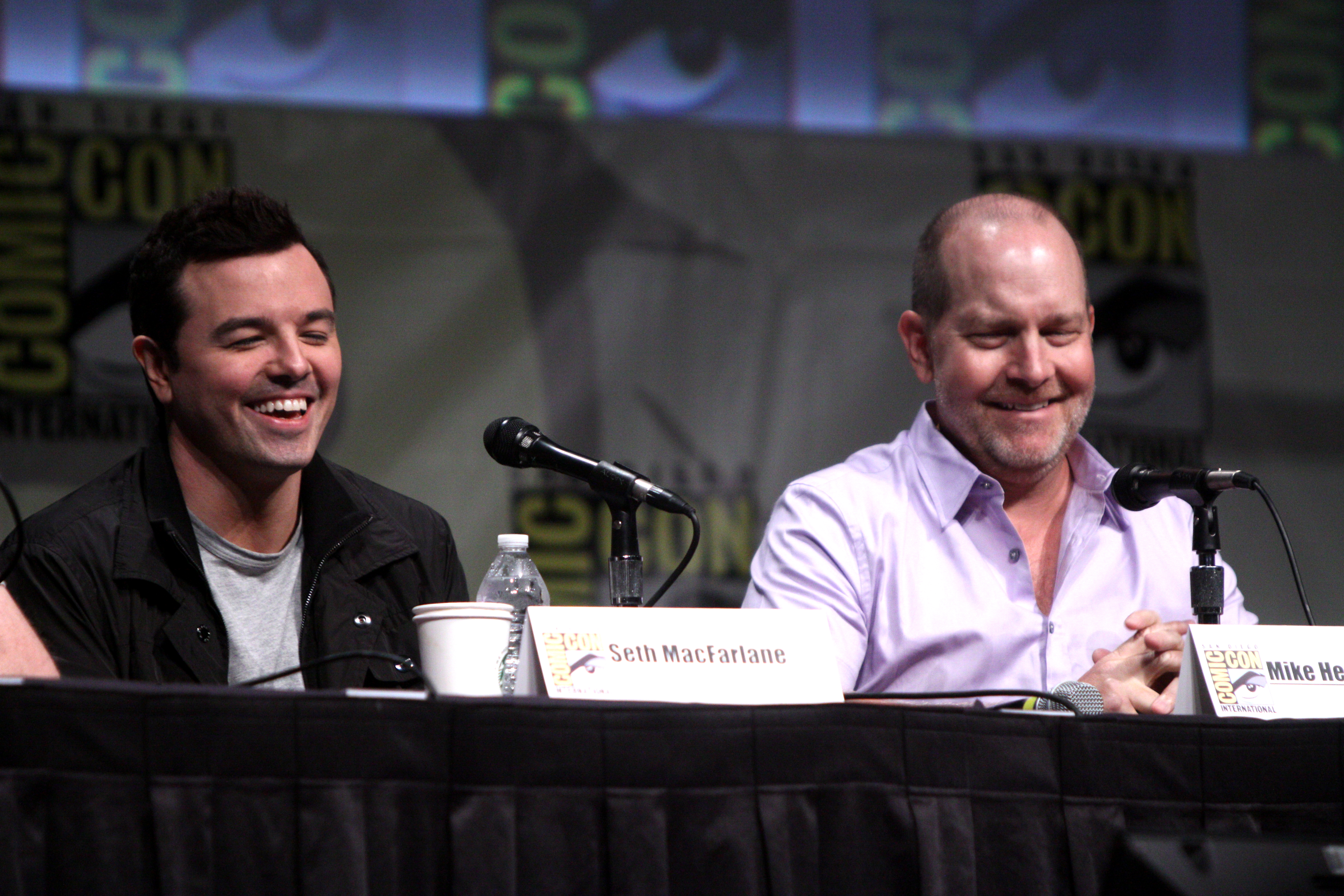
Mike Henry speaking in the San Diego Comic Con

== Early life and education ==
Henry was born in Pontiac, Michigan, on November 7, 1965, to artist parents and raised in Richmond, Virginia, with his younger brother Patrick. Their parents divorced when Henry was eight years old and the boys were primarily raised by their mother. He was awarded a scholarship and attended the nearby preparatory Collegiate School. Henry graduated from Washington and Lee University (1988), where he earned his B.A. in history and served as class president his sophomore to senior years. Although interested in comedy, Henry never believed he could make a career of it so instead opted for more "business stuff".

== Career ==
=== Early career ===
At 24, after a brief career in advertising, Henry moved to California to pursue acting. There he began taking classes at the Groundlings Theater and performing stand-up comedy. After three years in Los Angeles, Henry returned to Virginia to shoot short comedy films that he wrote and acted in. During that time, Henry often acted in his brother Patrick's student films at the Rhode Island School of Design, where he was introduced to his brother's college roommate, Seth MacFarlane. Henry recalled in 2018, "We immediately hit it off and cracked each other up and kept in touch."

Henry later moved to New York City, where he acted in commercials, studied improvisation at the Upright Citizens Brigade Theater and wrote, produced, starred in and co-directed (with his brother Patrick) comedy shorts for Lorne Michaels' Burly Bear Network.

=== Family Guy ===
Henry’s break came in 1998, when MacFarlane contacted him about being part of a new show called Family Guy. Mike agreed and joined the project as a writer and voice actor. Henry has stated that the inspiration for Cleveland's voice was based on "this guy that [he] had once played basketball with". During the show's first four seasons, he was credited as a guest star, but beginning with season five's "Prick Up Your Ears" he has been credited as a main cast member.

Two episodes into the second season, Family Guy was taken off the network's permanent schedule and shown irregularly thereafter. The show returned in March 2000 to finish airing the second season which contained 21 episodes; all the cast came back for the series return. During its second season, Fox publicly announced that the show had been cancelled. Despite the announced cancellation, in 2001 Fox decided to make the third season. During the third season, Fox announced that the show was canceled for good. Soon after Family Guy was cancelled, Henry and his brother created the popular web series Kicked in the Nuts!, a spoof of hidden camera shows. Family Guy was renewed again in 2005 for its fourth season due to strong DVD sales and its syndication on basic cable networks. Once again Henry and the rest of the cast came back for their voice works. In October 2017, Family Guy was renewed for its 16th season.

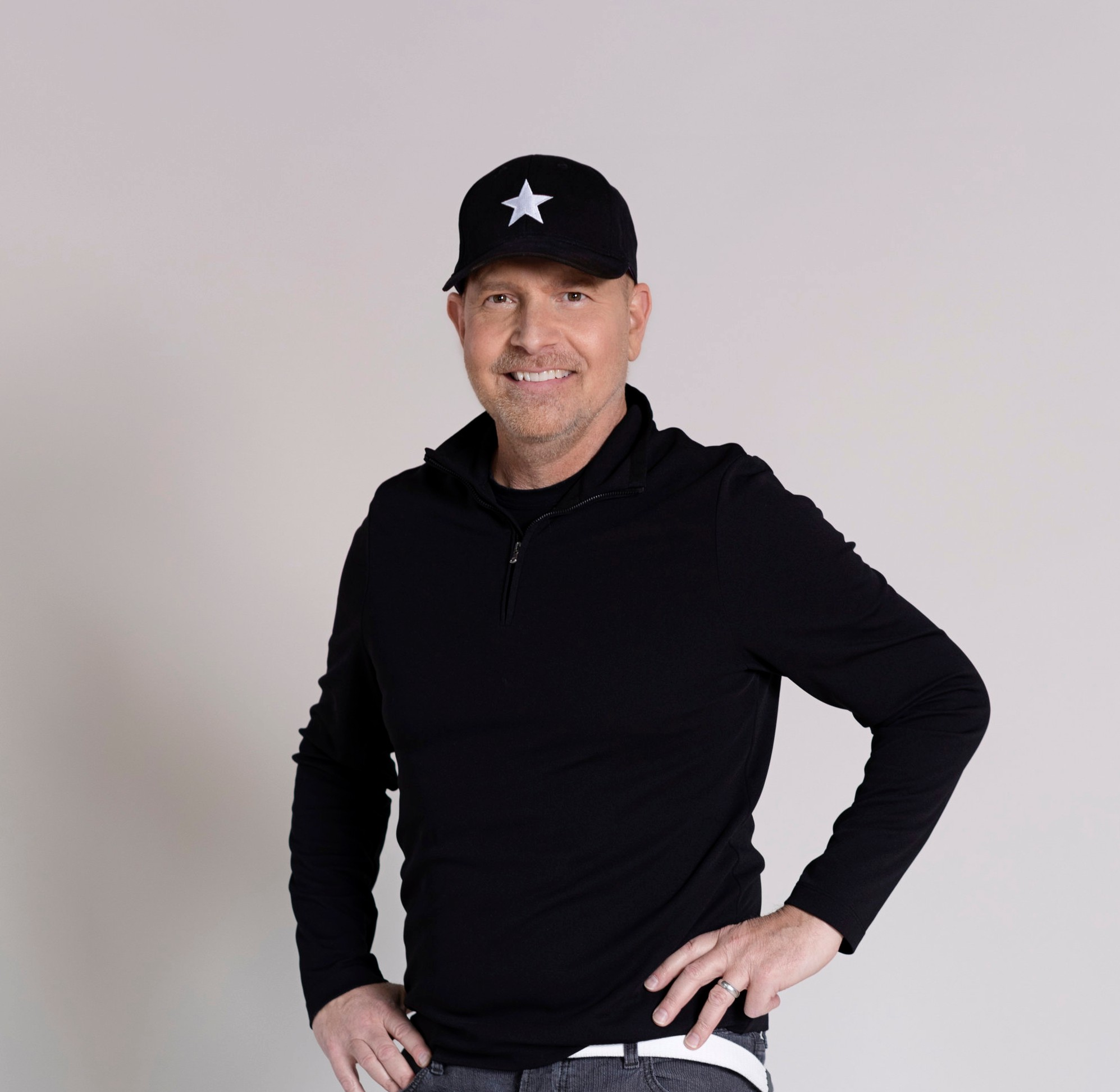
Mike Henry in 2018

=== The Cleveland Show ===
On September 27, 2009, The Cleveland Show premiered on Fox. The project was created and executive-produced by Henry, Seth MacFarlane and American Dad! showrunner Rich Appel. The show focused on the Family Guy character Cleveland Brown, who referenced the spin-off at the end of the Family Guy episode "Baby Not on Board". The first season consisted of 22 episodes and was picked up by Fox for a second 13-episode season. The announcement was made on May 3, 2009 before the first season even premiered. Due to strong ratings, Fox picked up two additional nine-episode seasons, bringing the total episode count of the show to 44. The show was renewed for a third and fourth season on May 9, 2011. The series was canceled after its fourth season on May 19, 2013, but reruns aired until 2024. The series ran for a total of four seasons and 88 episodes.

=== Departure from voicing Cleveland ===
On June 26, 2020, after twenty-one years of voicing the character, Henry announced on Twitter that he was stepping down from voicing Cleveland, stating "persons of color should play characters of color" due to heightening of the Black Lives Matter movement in the summer of that year following the police murder of George Floyd. On September 25, 2020, it was announced that YouTube personality Arif Zahir, who is African American, would replace Henry as Cleveland, but some episodes produced before Henry's departure from the role would still see Henry voicing the character. Speaking to Henry, who would continue to do other voices for the show, Zahir, who is a longtime fan of both the character and the show said, "you created something truly special, and I promise I will do my absolute best to honor your legacy." To the fans he said, "I promise not to let you down."

== Personal life ==
Henry married Linda Murray in 2002. They divorced in 2005 after three years of marriage. They have a son together. Henry has been married to his second wife, Sara Voelker, since 2007. They have a daughter.

== Filmography ==
=== Film ===
Year	Title	Role	Notes
2005	Stewie Griffin: The Untold Story	Cleveland Brown, Herbert, Bruce, The Greased-up Deaf Guy, Fred Rogers, Various characters (voices)	Direct-to-DVD; Also co-producer
2012	Ted	Southern Newscaster	Cameo
2014	A Million Ways to Die in the West	Cowboy	Cameo

=== Television ===
Year	Title	Role	Notes
1999–present	Family Guy	John Herbert, Bruce Straight, Consuela, The Greased-up Deaf Guy, Various characters (voices)	Also co-producer, producer, supervising producer, story editor, executive story editor, consultant, and writer; Nominated–Primetime Emmy Award for Outstanding Animated Program (2008); Nominated–Primetime Emmy Award for Outstanding Comedy Series (2009)
1999–2021	Family Guy	Cleveland Brown, Rallo Tubbs	Stepped down from voicing these characters on June 26, 2020
2003	Kicked in the Nuts!	Kicked in the Nuts Guy	Also co-creator, producer, director, editor, and writer
2003–2006	Gilmore Girls	Ed	4 episodes
2005–2010	Robot Chicken	Various characters (voices)	4 episodes
2005–present	American Dad!	Jackson, Various characters (voices)	79 episodes
2007	Scrubs	Urologist	Episode: "My Point of No Return"
2009–2013	The Cleveland Show	Cleveland Brown, Rallo Tubbs, Various characters (voices)	88 episodes; Also co-creator, executive producer, and writer; ASCAP Award for Top Television Series (2013); Nominated–Teen Choice Award for Choice Animated Series (2010); Nominated–Annie Award for Voice Acting in an Animated Television Production (2011); Nominated–Teen Choice Award for Choice Animated Series (2011); Nominated–Primetime Emmy Award for Outstanding Animated Program (2011)
2010	Robot Chicken: Star Wars Episode III	Yaddle (voice)	Television special
2017–2022	The Orville	Dann	11 episodes
2024	Ted	Bank Teller	Season 1 Episode 1 "Just Say Yes"
2027	Stewie	BJ (voice)	

=== Web ===
Year	Title	Role	Notes
2008–2009	Seth MacFarlane's Cavalcade of Cartoon Comedy	Various characters (voices)	3 episodes
2026	SPIDER-MAN 2 with a Talking Train	Narrator	Video by Hat-Loving Gamer

=== Video games ===
Year	Title	Voice role	Notes
2006	Family Guy Video Game!	Cleveland Brown, Herbert, The Greased-up Deaf Guy, Various characters (voices)	
2012	Family Guy: Back to the Multiverse	Cleveland Brown, Herbert, Consuela, Various characters (voices)	
2014	Family Guy: The Quest for Stuff	Cleveland Brown, Herbert; Bruce, Consuela, Rallo Tubbs, Various characters (voices)	
