= The Cleveland Show =

American animated sitcom (2009–2013)

- Genre: Animated sitcom Black sitcom
- Created by: Seth MacFarlane; Richard Appel; Mike Henry
- Based on: Characters by Seth MacFarlane
- Voices of: Mike Henry; Sanaa Lathan; Kevin Michael Richardson; Nia Long; Reagan Gomez-Preston; Jason Sudeikis; Seth MacFarlane; Will Forte; Jess Harnell
- Theme music composer: Walter Murphy
- Opening theme: "The Cleveland Show" (performed by Mike Henry)
- Composer: Walter Murphy
- Country of origin: United States
- Original language: English
- No. of seasons: 4
- No. of episodes: 88 (list of episodes)

Production
- Executive producers: Seth MacFarlane; Richard Appel; Mike Henry
- Producers: Kara Vallow; Courtney Lilly (season 3); Daniel Dratch (season 4)
- Editors: Kirk Benson; Dennis McElroy (season 4)
- Running time: 21–22 minutes
- Production companies: Persons Unknown Productions; Happy Jack Productions; Fuzzy Door Productions; 20th Century Fox Television

Original release
- Network: Fox
- Release: September 27, 2009 – May 19, 2013

Related
- Family Guy; Stewie

The Cleveland Show is an American animated sitcom created by Seth MacFarlane, Richard Appel, and Mike Henry, produced by Fox Television Animation for the Fox Broadcasting Company. A spin-off of Family Guy, and the second television series in the franchise, the series centers on Cleveland Brown, his new wife Donna Tubbs-Brown, and their children Cleveland Brown Jr., Roberta Tubbs, and Rallo Tubbs.

The series was conceived by MacFarlane in 2007 after developing Family Guy and American Dad! for the Fox network. MacFarlane centered the show on Family Guy character Cleveland Brown and created new characters for Cleveland's family members. One preexisting character, Cleveland's son Cleveland Jr. (Junior), was redesigned as an obese, soft-spoken teen, as opposed to his depiction as a younger, hyperactive child with average body weight on Family Guy.

The series premiered on September 27, 2009, and ended on May 19, 2013, after four seasons consisting of 88 episodes. The Cleveland Show was nominated for one Annie Award, one Primetime Emmy Award, and two Teen Choice Awards, but received mixed reviews from media critics. Fox cancelled the series after four seasons. Nearly a year after the series' cancelation, Cleveland returned to Family Guy, accompanied by the rest of the Brown-Tubbs family, in the season 12 episode "He's Bla-ack!".

== Production ==
=== Development ===
Seth MacFarlane initially conceived The Cleveland Show in 2007 while working on his other two animated series, Family Guy and American Dad!.

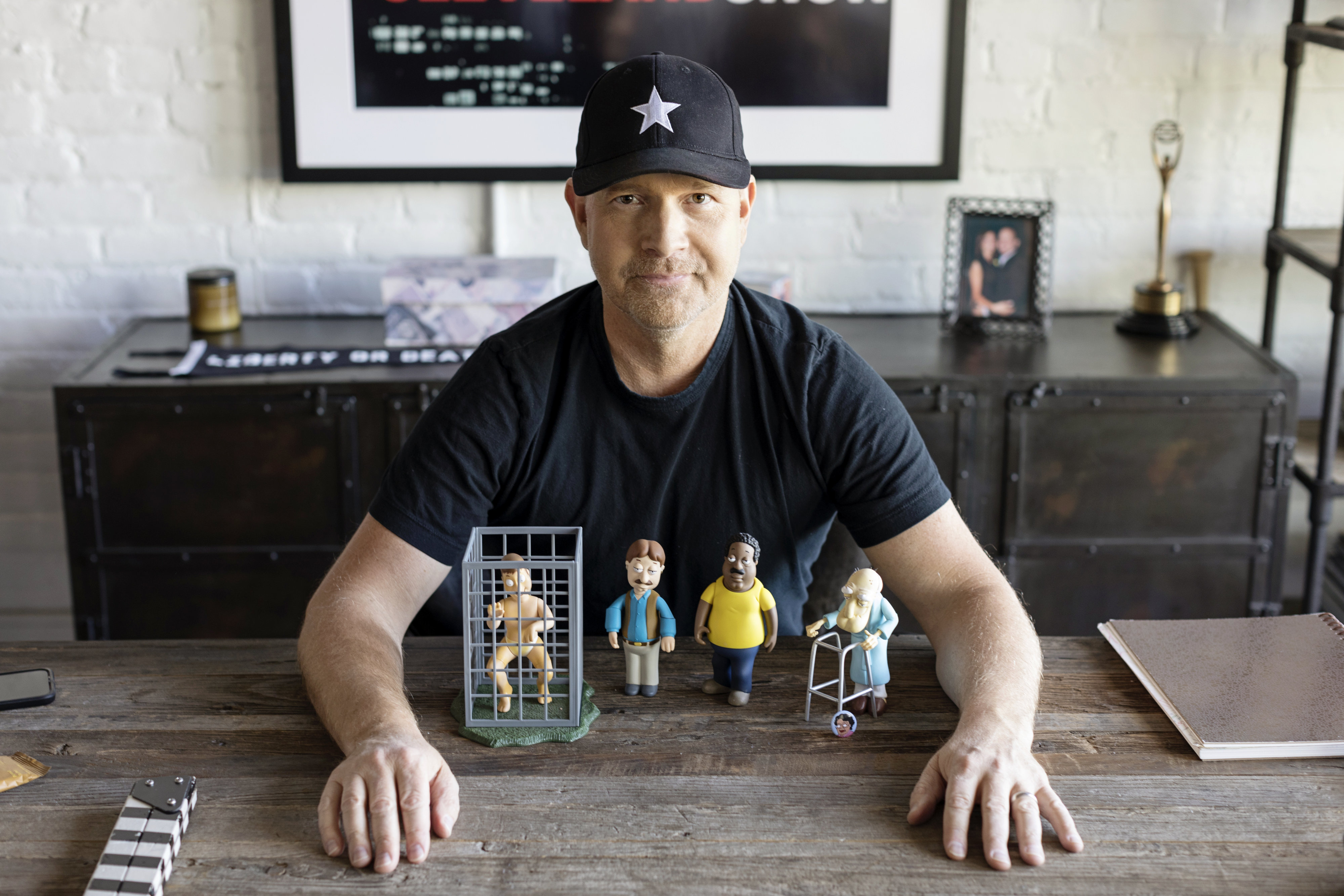
Mike Henry and his characters

The Cleveland Show first appeared on the development slate at Fox in early 2008, under no official name for the pilot, after a report that Fox had purchased the series from creators. The pilot was named The Cleveland Show in May 2008, when it appeared on the primetime slate for the 2008–09 television season, although it was not officially on the network schedule. Shortly after a report that King of the Hill just ended, leaving air time for The Cleveland Show, the show was picked up for a full season after an additional nine episodes of the show were ordered. In May 2009, The Cleveland Show appeared on the primetime slate for the 2009–10 television season, for airing on Sunday nights at 8:30 pm. On June 15, 2009, it was announced that The Cleveland Show would premiere on September 27, 2009.

MacFarlane and Henry pitched a 22-minute pilot to Fox which aired on September 27, 2009, but had been leaked online in June 2009. Even before the pilot episode premiered, the show had already been renewed for a 22-episode second season. After the first season of the show aired, it was given the green light to start production. On June 10, 2010, less than three weeks into the first season's summer hiatus, it was announced that Fox was ordering a third season. A fourth season was announced on May 9, 2011, just a few days before the second season concluded.

=== Executive producers ===
Seth MacFarlane, Mike Henry and Richard Appel served as executive producers on the series for its entire run.

=== Voice cast ===
Mike Henry voices two of the show's main characters: Cleveland Brown and Rallo Tubbs. The voice of Cleveland was developed originally for Family Guy by Henry after being influenced by one of his best friends who had a very distinct regional accent. For the voice of Rallo, Henry stated that he created the voice over twenty years before; he had used it while making prank phone calls.

Sanaa Lathan voices Donna Tubbs, the wife of Cleveland, stepmother of Cleveland Brown Jr., and mother of Roberta and Rallo Tubbs. In developing the character, Lathan said that the producers "wanted her to be educated, but to have some edge." Prior to voicing Donna, Lathan had only one other voice credit in a relatively low-budget film entitled The Golden Blaze. In addition to the show, she also primarily worked as an actress in such films as Alien vs. Predator, Blade, Love & Basketball and The Family That Preys.

Reagan Gomez-Preston plays Roberta Tubbs, the stepdaughter of Cleveland. Gomez has stated that she uses her own voice to portray Roberta and that she herself gets mistaken for a fifteen-year-old over the phone "all the time." Before Gomez was cast as Roberta, Nia Long (who co-starred with Lathan in The Best Man franchise) provided the character's voice during the first thirteen episodes. According to Long, she was replaced because producers decided they wanted an actress with a younger-sounding voice, given that the character is a teenager.

Kevin Michael Richardson, a recurring guest voice on Family Guy and American Dad!, portrays Cleveland, Jr., as well as Cleveland's next-door neighbor Lester Krinklesac. In portraying Cleveland, Jr., Richardson drew inspiration from a character named Patrick that he had played on the NBC drama series ER who was mentally impaired and wore a football helmet. For Lester, Richardson stated in an interview that, being African American, he had "run into a few rednecks in [his] time", and decided to simply perform a stereotypical redneck impression for the voice of Lester.

Jason Sudeikis plays Holt Richter, one of Cleveland's drinking buddies with short stature, and Terry Kimple, one of Cleveland's longtime friends who now works with him at Waterman Cable. Sudeikis originally began as a recurring cast member, but starting with the episode "Harder, Better, Faster, Browner", he was promoted to a series regular.

Seth MacFarlane played Tim the Bear up until season 3 episode 10, which MacFarlane admits is a "Steve Martin impression [...] a Wild and Crazy Guy impression". Jess Harnell voices the character for the rest of the series from the next episode onward, as MacFarlane had a busy schedule which kept him away from voicing the character, while he was working on Ted. Seth had also voiced the character Dr. Fist in seasons one to two, but was replaced by Tom Kenny, in both episodes "Skip Day" and "'Til Deaf", and Bryan Cranston for the remainder of the series.

Other voices include that of Arianna Huffington as Tim's wife Arianna the Bear, Nat Faxon as Tim and Arianna's son Raymond the Bear, Jamie Kennedy as Roberta's boyfriend Gabriel Friedman, a.k.a. "Federline Jones", Will Forte as Principal Wally, Frances Callier as Evelyn "Cookie" Brown, Craig Robinson as LeVar "Freight Train" Brown and David Lynch as Gus the bartender.

Main cast members
Mike Henry	Sanaa Lathan	Reagan Gomez-Preston	Kevin Michael Richardson	Jason Sudeikis	Seth MacFarlane
Cleveland Brown and Rallo Tubbs	Donna Tubbs	Roberta Tubbs	Cleveland Brown, Jr. and Lester Krinklesac	Holt Richter and Terry Kimple	Tim the Bear (seasons 1–3) and Dr. Fist (seasons 1–2)

== Characters ==
The Brown-Tubbs family. Clockwise from top left: Cleveland, Donna, Roberta, Rallo, and Cleveland, Jr.

Cleveland's newly introduced family includes his new wife, Donna Tubbs-Brown (voiced by Sanaa Lathan); Donna's daughter Roberta (originally voiced by Nia Long, but later voiced by Reagan Gomez-Preston); and Donna's son Rallo (voiced by Mike Henry). Cleveland, Jr. (voiced by Kevin Michael Richardson) underwent a complete redesign for the show, becoming sensitive and soft-spoken.

== Episodes ==
Season	Episodes	Originally released		Rank	Average viewership (in millions)
Season	Episodes	First released	Last released	Rank	Average viewership (in millions)
1	21	September 27, 2009	May 23, 2010	72	6.38
2	22	September 26, 2010	May 15, 2011	90	6.12
3	22	September 25, 2011	May 20, 2012	144	4.03
4	23	October 7, 2012	May 19, 2013	129	3.05

== Release ==
=== Syndication ===
In July 2010, the Turner Broadcasting System picked up syndication rights, for their networks TBS and later, Adult Swim. The series first aired on Adult Swim in the United States on September 29, 2012. On July 14, 2018, Viacom later picked up the rights to the series and the series left Adult Swim and TBS on September 9, 2018. The series began airing on Comedy Central in the United States on October 8, 2018, until April 29, 2022, and then again since November 6, 2023, airing sporadically on the network, with the most recent airings in 2025. Comedy Central shares the show along with BET and VH1.

The series aired on FXX from September 20, 2021, to September 20, 2024.

==== Cancellation ====
On April 17, 2013, Fox dismissed increasing rumors that The Cleveland Show had been canceled, reporting rather that renewal of the series was undetermined as of that time. However, on May 13, 2013, in the New York Daily News, Fox Chairman of Entertainment Kevin Reilly confirmed the show's cancellation. Following the series cancellation, it was confirmed by Seth MacFarlane that Cleveland would be moving back to Quahog with the rest of the Brown-Tubbs family to rejoin the Family Guy cast during the show's 12th season.

=== Home media ===
The series is available for streaming on Hulu and Hulu on Disney+. Internationally, The Cleveland Show is available to stream on Star on Disney+.

DVD Title	# of Disc(s)	Years active	# of Episodes	DVD release		
DVD Title	# of Disc(s)	Years active	# of Episodes	Region 1	Region 2	Region 4
Season One	4	2009 & 2010	21	September 28, 2010	October 11, 2010	June 29, 2011
Season Two	4	2010 & 2011	22	September 27, 2011	January 30, 2012	November 2, 2011
Season Three	3	2011 & 2012	22	March 1, 2013; Manufactured on demand (MOD) on DVD-R	N/A	N/A
Season Four	3	2012 & 2013	23	December 17, 2013; Manufactured on demand (MOD) on DVD-R	N/A	N/A

== Reception ==
=== Critical response ===
The Cleveland Show initially received mixed reviews from critics. The review aggregator website Rotten Tomatoes reported a 44% approval rating for the first season, with an average rating of 5.10/10 and based on 18 critic reviews. The website's critics consensus reads, "The Cleveland Show is simply not interesting enough to capture the same comedic lightning of Seth MacFarlane's Family Guy." Metacritic, which uses a weighted average, gave the season a score of 57 out of 100 based on 18 critic reviews, indicating "mixed or average reviews."

Ahsan Haque of IGN gave the pilot episode a grade of 8.3 out of 10, praised the opening theme and the humor of the show, and said, "While it seems to be missing some of the over-the-top offensive bite we're used to on Family Guy, and Cleveland's new drinking buddies aren't quite as amusing as the Quagmire, Joe and Peter combination - there's a lot to like here. It might take a while for the show to grow out of its Family Guy shadow, but with a greater focus on wacky family focused stories, we might get to see much personality burst out of the normally sedate Cleveland." Jonathan Storm of The Philadelphia Inquirer found The Cleveland Show to be "a little warmer and sillier" than Family Guy. Rob Owen of the Pittsburgh Post-Gazette stated that although The Cleveland Show is "just as rude-crude" as Family Guy, it also had "more warmth" due to Cleveland being a more likable character than Peter Griffin. Owen also praised the character of Tim the Bear, stating that "Tim is by far the most amusing creation."

Tom Shales of The Washington Post spoke very negatively about both the show and MacFarlane himself, describing him as "no better than the dirty old man hanging around playgrounds with naughty pictures or risque jokes as lures". Roberto Bianco of USA Today wrote a similarly negative review, suggesting that the easiest fix for its problem was "cancellation". John McWhorter of The New Republic called it "a patronizing mess" and "basically Family Guy in blackface". He added: "What isn't black in it is so shamelessly ripped off from Family Guy that it's hard to believe it's the product of creators who are usually so studiously 'post-' obvious stunts of the sort." Matt Rouse of TV Guide wrote, "The lamest, most unnecessary spin-off since Private Practice, Cleveland rests on the shoulders of the hopelessly bland title character."

=== Nielsen ratings ===
Season		No. of episodes	Timeslot (ET)	First aired		Last aired		Overall ratings	
Season		No. of episodes	Timeslot (ET)	Date	Premiere viewers (in millions)	Date	Finale viewers (in millions)	Rank	Viewers (in millions)
1	2009–10	21	Sunday 8:30 pm (Episodes 1–4, 6–10, 12–21); Sunday 9:30 pm (Episodes 5, 11)	September 27, 2009	9.51	May 23, 2010	4.94	72	6.38
2	2010–11	22	Sunday 8:30 pm (Episodes 1–8); Sunday 9:00 pm (Episode 9); Sunday 9:30 pm (Episodes 10–22)	September 26, 2010	6.61	May 15, 2011	4.90	90	6.12
3	2011–12	22	Sunday 8:30 pm (Episodes 1–2, 7–8); Sunday 9:30 pm (Episodes 3, 6, 17, 19); Sunday 7:30 pm (4–5, 8–16, 18, 20–22)	September 25, 2011	6.13	May 20, 2012	3.01	144	4.03
4	2012–13	23	Sunday 7:30 pm (Episodes 1–3, 5–11, 14, 17–19, 21, 23); Sunday 9:30 pm (Episodes 4, 16); Sunday 8:30 pm (Episodes 12–13, 15); Sunday 7:00 pm (Episodes 20, 22)	October 7, 2012	4.47	May 19, 2013	2.43	129	3.05

=== Accolades ===
Year	Award	Category	Recipients and nominees	Result	Ref.
2010	Teen Choice Awards	Choice TV: Animated Show	The Cleveland Show	Nominated	
2010	People's Choice Awards	Favorite New TV Comedy	The Cleveland Show	Nominated	
2011	Annie Awards	Best Voice Acting in an Animated Television Production	Mike Henry as Cleveland Brown	Nominated	
2011	Primetime Emmy Awards	Outstanding Animated Program	"Murray Christmas"	Nominated	
2011	NAMIC Vision Awards	Animation	The Cleveland Show	Nominated	
2011	Teen Choice Awards	Choice TV: Animated Show	The Cleveland Show	Nominated	
2012	Artios Award	Outstanding Achievement in Casting – Television Animation	Robert McGee and Ruth Lambert	Nominated	
2013	American Society of Composers, Authors and Publishers	Top Television Series	The Cleveland Show	Won	
2013	People's Choice Awards	Favorite Cartoon Show	The Cleveland Show	Nominated	

== In other media ==
The Cleveland Show characters have appeared on other animated sitcoms and vice versa. The Cleveland Show crossovers have all involved two other animated programs. Both the other two animated programs were also created by Seth MacFarlane—Family Guy and American Dad!. There are also many brief cameos of characters from three other Fox animated shows, The Simpsons, Futurama, and King of the Hill.
