= Cleveland Brown =

Fictional character from the Family Guy franchise

- Family Guy / The Cleveland Show character
- First appearance: "Death Has a Shadow"; Family Guy; January 31, 1999
- Created by: Mike Henry; Seth MacFarlane
- Designed by: Seth MacFarlane
- Voiced by: Phil LaMarr (1998; original pilot); Mike Henry (1999–2021); Arif Zahir (2021–present)

In-universe information
- Full name: Cleveland Orenthal Brown Sr.
- Gender: Male
- Occupation: Deli owner (formerly); Musician (formerly); Toronto Blue Jays Baseball player (formerly); Cable television installer (formerly); High school baseball coach (formerly); Therapist (formerly); Brewery Transport Manager (formerly); Postal worker (currently)
- Family: LeVar "Freight Train" Brown (father); Evelyn "Cookie" Brown (mother); Broderick Brown (brother)
- Spouses: Donna Tubbs-Brown; Loretta Brown (ex-wife/deceased)
- Children: Cleveland Brown Jr. (son) Roberta Tubbs (step-daughter); Rallo Tubbs (step-son)
- Home: Quahog, Rhode Island
- Nationality: Afro-Cuban
- Age: 42

Cleveland Orenthal Brown Sr. is a fictional character from the animated television series Family Guy, and its spin-off series The Cleveland Show. He is a neighbor and friend of the Griffin family and is best known for his mild-mannered deadpan delivery. His established profession was that of a deli owner, before he switched over to being a postal worker after his return to Family Guy.

In the earlier seasons of Family Guy, Cleveland frequently appeared alongside his wife Loretta Brown (voiced by Alex Borstein), until their divorce was portrayed in the Family Guy season 4 episode "The Cleveland–Loretta Quagmire". The pilot episode of The Cleveland Show depicts Cleveland's farewell to the familiar characters and settings of Family Guy. The Cleveland Show establishes its setting of Stoolbend, Virginia as Cleveland's childhood home town. Following The Cleveland Show's cancellation in 2013, Cleveland returned to Family Guy the following year.

== Personality ==
Cleveland is usually depicted as exceedingly patient and sweet-natured, and only on rare occasions has he been known to lose his temper and resort to violence. However, Cleveland gets visibly annoyed with racist behavior. He often acts as the voice of caution when other characters hatch harebrained schemes. Cleveland's speech is slow, almost elongated. Various flashbacks give conflicting histories of his speech patterns. A flashback in the episode "Death Lives" shows that Peter Griffin met Cleveland in the 1970s, when Cleveland already spoke in the slow manner that he is known for. Likewise, in the premiere of his spin-off, it is revealed that Cleveland talked in a slow manner when he was in high school. In the fourth season episode "Blind Ambition", an out-of-continuity flashback depicts Cleveland as a fast-talking auctioneer when a totem pole falls over onto his head, resulting in a slower rate of speech. He was conceived during the seventh-inning stretch of a Cleveland Indians (now Guardians) game.

One of the running gags throughout the series is that Peter's shenanigans frequently destroy the front wall of Cleveland's house, revealing him in the bathtub. He then exclaims: "No, no, no, no, no, no!!!!!" as the upstairs floor tilts and the tub crashes to the ground and shatters. In the pilot of his spin-off, this gag was the last straw that convinced Cleveland to leave Quahog. However, even several states away, the Griffins' antics are still seen to cause this event, such as when debris from the missile that Brian, Stewie, Dan Aykroyd and Chevy Chase destroy happens to fall right on Cleveland's new house in the episode "Spies Reminiscent of Us". In "Brian's Got a Brand New Bag", Cleveland's now-unoccupied house is destroyed when Peter watches the movie Road House and beats up Brian, which results in a car crashing into the house, and the empty bathtub crashes to the ground. Afterward, Peter says "Oh, that's right. Cleveland moved." In the Cleveland Show episode "Gone with the Wind", the same running gag affects his former wife Loretta Brown, and she breaks her neck on the ground, causing her death.

Cleveland's bathtub accidents have been caused by Peter's giraffe stumbling backwards into his house, the flying missile as stated above, Peter and Lois trying to move their mentally disabled horse by driving into it, missing, and driving into his house, and other accidents. Cleveland has acknowledged that he ought not to take baths during Peter's shenanigans.

Cleveland sometimes will show some sexual deviance or arousal towards attractive women. This is shown in the episode "Petarded", when Peter brings seven prostitutes into his house to get back custody of his children and prove to child services that Cleveland is an unfit father. Cleveland responds, "Peter! You and five of those prostitutes get out!" In the Family Guy episode "Love Blactually", it is suggested that he may have contracted genital warts by having sex with a woman with whom Brian was previously involved. Additionally, Cleveland has "no toenails anyhow" according to season 14 episode 19 "Run, Chris, Run" in which he and Jerome discuss a toenail fungus commercial.

== Development ==
=== Creation ===
Writers may have named the character Cleveland Brown in reference to the similarly named football team, although his last name was not revealed until after Family Guy returned from cancellation in 2005. Furthering this connection, a commercial aired during Super Bowl XLV that showed many TV characters wearing NFL jerseys, with everyone in Quahog wearing New England Patriots jerseys except Cleveland, who is wearing a Cleveland Browns jersey in reference to his name.

During a live broadcast of "Loveline", Seth MacFarlane announced that a Family Guy spin-off featuring Cleveland was currently in the works with the studio and writers. The series was the first new product of MacFarlane's $100 million deal with Fox. The series was mentioned in the final moments of the Family Guy season 7 episode "Baby Not on Board", with Cleveland telling Quagmire "Did I tell you I'm getting a spin-off". It premiered on Fox on September 27, 2009, right after The Simpsons. The Cleveland Show is an animated series focusing on the character of Cleveland Brown and his family as Cleveland moves from Rhode Island to Virginia. His newly introduced family includes his high school sweetheart, Donna, who is now his second wife, her 15-year-old daughter, Roberta, and her 5-year-old son, Montclair, who goes by his nickname Rallo. Cleveland Jr. is also in the family, but is now much fatter than he appeared on Family Guy, and also suffers from astigmatism. Though several of these details were changed, it was announced that Cleveland's neighbours would include a family of talking anthropomorphic bears, a redneck couple and a Victorian-era British family, and one of his son's soccer rivals includes a boy voiced by Kanye West.

Cleveland was officially written out of Family Guy during Season 8 before The Cleveland Show was broadcast; however, it had been hinted that he might come back for a visit in the future, including the episode "Something, Something, Something, Dark Side", although fantasies and film parodies are generally accepted as non-canon Family Guy episodes. He appeared in a cameo in "Spies Reminiscent of Us", in which he dealt with the indignity of having his new house wrecked in the same fashion as his old one in Quahog, as well as appearing in the season 8 episode "The Splendid Source", where he joins the gang on a road trip to find the source of a dirty joke Chris Griffin told at school. In the Family Guy episode "Life of Brian", Cleveland and Donna are seen mourning over Brian's (now undone) death. Again he appears for a full episode in season 10, "Cool Hand Peter" where he, Peter, Joe, and Quagmire go on a road trip to Louisiana together. Cleveland makes yet another short appearance in season 8, Episode 13 "Go Stewie Go", where Cleveland appears in the Griffins' house along with other characters just to investigate Meg's normal boyfriend. Another idea had been that Peter Griffin and possibly other Family Guy characters would be traveling in the South and make a guest appearance on The Cleveland Show.

Additionally, Cleveland appeared at the end of the American Dad! episode "Hurricane!", which was part of a crossover storyline with Family Guy and The Cleveland Show called Night of the Hurricane.

Cleveland and his family appeared in The Simpsons episode "Homerland", as guests into the season 25 premiere. They were denied admission at first, but the bouncer then changes his mind and lets them in. Homer is not let into the premiere.

The Cleveland Show aired its last episode on May 19, 2013, and was cancelled on July 16. On the same day, Seth MacFarlane revealed that Cleveland would return to Family Guy during the 12th season in the episode "He's Bla-ack!". In that episode, Peter, Quagmire, and Joe mock The Cleveland Show, but still accept him back into their group of friends. Lois and Donna have an argument about parenting which ends with the two women forbidding their husbands to be friends with each other anymore. However the fight is eventually resolved and Peter and Cleveland can be friends again. Cleveland replaces Mort Goldman in the opening credits soon after the episode on-wards.

=== Voice ===
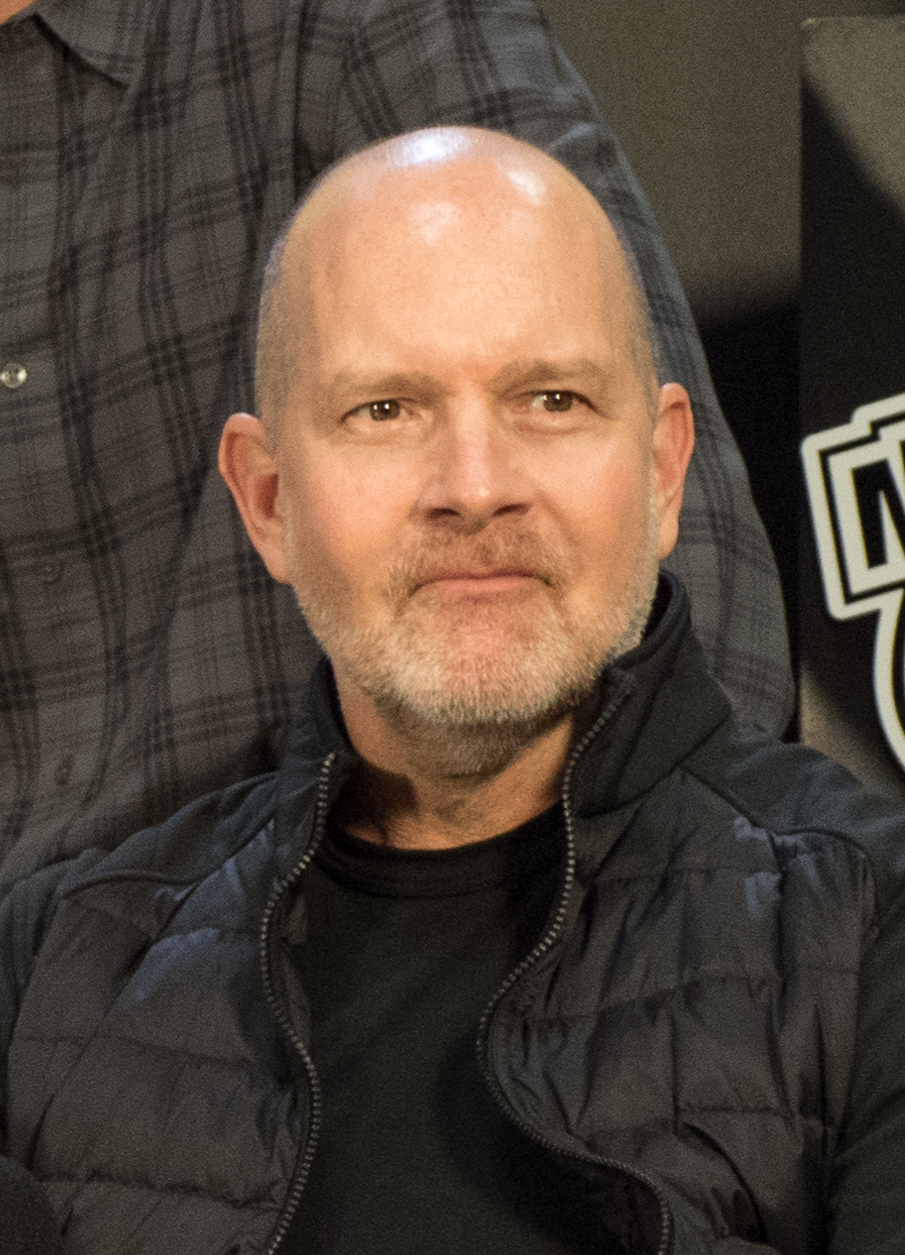
Cleveland's original voice actor, Mike Henry in 2018

Mike Henry was the original voice of Cleveland Brown, and also continues to voice John Herbert and Bruce Straight, as well as some minor recurring characters like the Greased-Up Deaf Guy. Henry met MacFarlane at the Rhode Island School of Design and kept in touch with him after they graduated. A few years later, MacFarlane contacted him about being part of the show; he agreed and came on as both a writer and voice actor. Henry based Cleveland's voice on one of his basketball partners in Virginia. During the show's first four seasons, he was credited as a guest star, but beginning with season five's "Prick Up Your Ears", he has been credited as a main cast member.

On June 26, 2020, amidst racial tensions in the United States due to the police murder of George Floyd, Henry, who is white, announced on Twitter that he was stepping down from voicing the character after twenty-one years, stating "persons of color should play characters of color." Actor Wendell Pierce launched a campaign to become Henry's replacement afterward. On September 25, 2020, it was announced that Arif Zahir would take over as Cleveland, starting in the show's 20th season. Zahir had previously gained Internet popularity with voice impressions of the character. Speaking to Henry, who was to continue doing other voices for the show, Zahir, who was a longtime fan of both the character and the show, said: "...you created something truly special, and I promise I will do my absolute best to honor your legacy." To the fans he said, "I promise not to let you down." Before the 20th season premiere in 2021, Henry sent a video on Twitter saying that he was "handing the torch" to Zahir and said a farewell message in Cleveland's voice.
