= Family Guy season 1 =

Episode list for a season of an animated series

Family Guy
- Season 1
- DVD cover
- Showrunners: Seth MacFarlane; David Zuckerman
- Starring: Seth MacFarlane; Alex Borstein; Seth Green; Lacey Chabert
- No. of episodes: 7

Release
- Original network: Fox
- Original release: January 31 – May 16, 1999

Season chronology
- Next → Season 2

The first season of Family Guy aired on Fox from January 31 to May 16, 1999, and consisted of only seven episodes, making it the shortest season to date. The series follows the dysfunctional Griffin family—father Peter, mother Lois, daughter Meg, son Chris, son Stewie and their anthropomorphic dog Brian, all of whom reside in their hometown of Quahog, a fictional city in the U.S. state of Rhode Island. The show features the voices of series creator Seth MacFarlane, Alex Borstein, Seth Green, and Lacey Chabert in the roles of the Griffin family. The executive producers for the first season were David Zuckerman and MacFarlane. It is also the only full season to feature Chabert, before she was replaced by Mila Kunis for the rest of the series' run, starting with the season two episode "Da Boom".

The series premiere, "Death Has a Shadow", was broadcast directly after Super Bowl XXXIII and was watched by 22.01 million viewers. The rest of the first season would then air between 11 April and 16 May 1999, with all of its episodes airing on Sundays; following the first season, the show left Sunday nights, and would not return to airing on Sundays until 2005. The series received praise from most critics, particularly "I Never Met the Dead Man" and "Brian: Portrait of a Dog", however some critics disliked the themes of the episodes. The Volume One DVD box set, including all seven episodes and the second season, was released in Region 1 on April 15, 2003, Region 2 on November 12, 2001, and Region 4 on October 20, 2003. The series has since been released in syndication.

MacFarlane conceived the idea for Family Guy in 1995, while studying animation at the Rhode Island School of Design (RISD). There, he created his thesis film The Life of Larry, which his professor at RISD later submitted to Hanna-Barbera; this led to MacFarlane being hired by the company. Executives at Fox saw the Larry shorts and contracted MacFarlane to create a series based on the characters entitled Family Guy. While working on the series, Larry and his dog Steve slowly evolved into Peter and Brian; the rest of the series characters were added later.

== Voice cast and characters ==
- Seth MacFarlane as Peter Griffin, Brian Griffin, Stewie Griffin, Glenn Quagmire, Tom Tucker
- Alex Borstein as Lois Griffin
- Seth Green as Chris Griffin
- Lacey Chabert as Meg Griffin

=== Supporting characters ===
- Lori Alan as Diane Simmons
- Carlos Alazraqui as Jonathan Weed
- Mike Henry as Cleveland Brown, Bruce
- Phil LaMarr as Ollie Williams
- Jennifer Tilly as Bonnie Swanson
- Patrick Warburton as Joe Swanson

== Episodes ==
No. overall	No. in season	Title	Directed by	Written by	Original release date	Prod. code	U.S. viewers (millions)
1	1	"Death Has a Shadow"	Peter Shin	Seth MacFarlane	January 31, 1999	1ACX01	22.00
Peter applies for welfare to support his family after losing his job. He receives a check for $150,000 due to a misplaced decimal point, and uses it to buy lavish presents for his family. Lois is upset when she finds out after receiving a new welfare check in the mail; Peter attempts to make her happy by dropping his surplus money out of a blimp above Super Bowl XXXIII with the help of Brian. Both are arrested by security guards and prosecuted for welfare fraud. At the courthouse, Lois pleads with the judge not to imprison Peter; Stewie, grudgingly coming to realize his dependence on his parents, influences the judge to reconsider the sentence.
2	2	"I Never Met the Dead Man"	Michael Dante DiMartino	Chris Sheridan	April 11, 1999	1ACX02	14.50
Peter has become addicted to television. While driving Meg home, he is distracted by a show he wanted to watch on a television in a nearby house, and crashes into the city's cable transmitter, cutting reception for the entire town of Quahog. Peter panics and steals the transmitter and convinces Meg to take blame for the outage. Stewie steals the satellite dish in a plan to create a weather control device. Suffering withdrawal syndrome from lack of television, Peter straps a cardboard cutout to himself, making it appear as though the world is a television program. Meg confesses that her father actually was to blame for the cable outage, causing the town to turn against him; he is saved when Lois gives a heartfelt speech to the community. Inspired, Peter brings the family to various outdoor activities, quickly exhausting them; he then goes off with William Shatner. Meanwhile, Stewie's weather machine creates a rainstorm; while Meg is practicing driving, the storm causes her to accidentally hit Shatner and Peter, killing Shatner and hospitalizing Peter. As her father recovers in a full-body cast, he is forced to watch television, causing him to become addicted once again.
3	3	"Chitty Chitty Death Bang"	Dominic Polcino	Danny Smith	April 18, 1999	1ACX04	13.78
Peter accidentally loses the reservation for Stewie's first birthday party at a local restaurant, and must create a new party. Meanwhile, Stewie misinterprets "birthday", assuming that the mysterious Man in White who delivered him as an infant will return to force him back into Lois' womb. Peter fails to put together a party in time for Stewie's birthday, and reroutes a circus parade into the Griffins' backyard. He gives Meg permission to go to a "party" at her friend's house, not realizing that it is a cult meeting where the attendees will commit mass suicide by drinking poisoned fruit punch. Peter retrieves Meg before the cult members drink the punch. The cult leader notices that Meg did not drink; he puts on his white robe and goes to the Griffins' house. Stewie traps and kills the cult leader, thinking he is the Man in White.
4	4	"Mind Over Murder"	Roy Allen Smith	Neil Goldman & Garrett Donovan	April 25, 1999	1ACX03	11.69
Stewie has begun teething; Lois explains to him that the pain will pass with time, so he decides to build a time machine. Lois asks Peter to take Chris to a soccer game; there, Peter punches a pregnant woman and is put under house arrest. Peter decides to open a bar in his basement so that his friends will come to visit; it becomes a hot spot and Lois becomes upset until she sings at the bar. Peter becomes jealous and has his friends' wives to drag them out of the bar. A cigarette starts a fire; when Peter and Lois become aware of it and attempt to escape, Stewie's time machine takes everyone back to the point when Lois asks Peter to take Chris to the game. This time, Peter trips over the time machine and destroys it.
5	5	"A Hero Sits Next Door"	Monte Young	Mike Barker & Matt Weitzman	May 2, 1999	1ACX05	12.61
After Peter injures the Happy-Go-Lucky Toy Factory's new employee Guillermo during softball practice, he is forced by his boss Mr. Weed to find a replacement for the upcoming softball game. Meanwhile, Lois meets the Griffin family's new neighbors, the Swansons. Peter is initially annoyed by Joe Swanson and has no interest in becoming his friend, but convinces Joe to play for the softball team once Lois mentions that he played baseball in college. Next morning at the game, Peter is surprised to learn that Joe uses a wheelchair. Joe's experience helps the team win. Peter becomes jealous of Joe and tries to become a hero by stopping a robbery; he ends up as a hostage until Joe convinces the robbers to surrender. Peter is disappointed, but his family tells him that he is their hero.
6	6	"The Son Also Draws"	Neil Affleck	Ricky Blitt	May 9, 1999	1ACX06	11.20
Chris is ejected from the Youth Scouts (Family Guy's version of the Boy Scouts) when he runs over the troop leader at the Soap Box Derby. Although Chris dislikes scouts and prefers drawing, he fears telling Peter. When Peter finds out, he drives the family to the scout headquarters in Manhattan to get Chris readmitted. On a rest stop at a Native American casino, Lois becomes a gambling addict and loses the family car. Since each Native American receives a share of the casino profits, Peter pretends to be a Native American, and he is sent on a vision quest to prove his heritage. Chris accompanies Peter to explain that he only likes drawing. Delirious from hunger, Peter begins talking to anthropomorphic trees and has a vision of his spiritual guide, the Fonz. Peter recognizes his son's talent for drawing; they return to the casino and reclaim the car.
7	7	"Brian: Portrait of a Dog"	Michael Dante DiMartino	Gary Janetti	May 16, 1999	1ACX07	13.10
Quahog is in the grip of an unusual heat wave. The Griffins ask Brian to enter a dog show, offering a top prize of $500, so they are able to buy air conditioning. Brian performs his tricks at the show; Peter asks Brian to beg for a treat, but Brian finds it demeaning and exits quickly. On the way home, Peter and Brian argue until Brian exits the car; the police give Brian a ticket for violating the local leash law. Another debate ensues and Peter mentions that he found Brian as a stray dog. Angry that Peter had brought that up, Brian leaves the house, whereupon he is treated by the community as a second-class citizen and must sleep at a bus stop. Peter purchases a new cat which turns out to be abusive, so the Griffins abandon it and search for Brian. By the time Peter decides to apologize to Brian, he has been taken away by the police and awaits his death sentence. Brian begins to plead his case but is interrupted when the court decides "it is stupid" to listen to a dog. As he is about to be dismissed, Peter steps in and delivers a last-ditch emotional appeal on his behalf. The city council members hearing the case remain unmoved, but once Peter bribes them $20 each, Brian is immediately freed, with all charges against him dropped as the town shows him new respect.

== Development ==
=== Conception ===
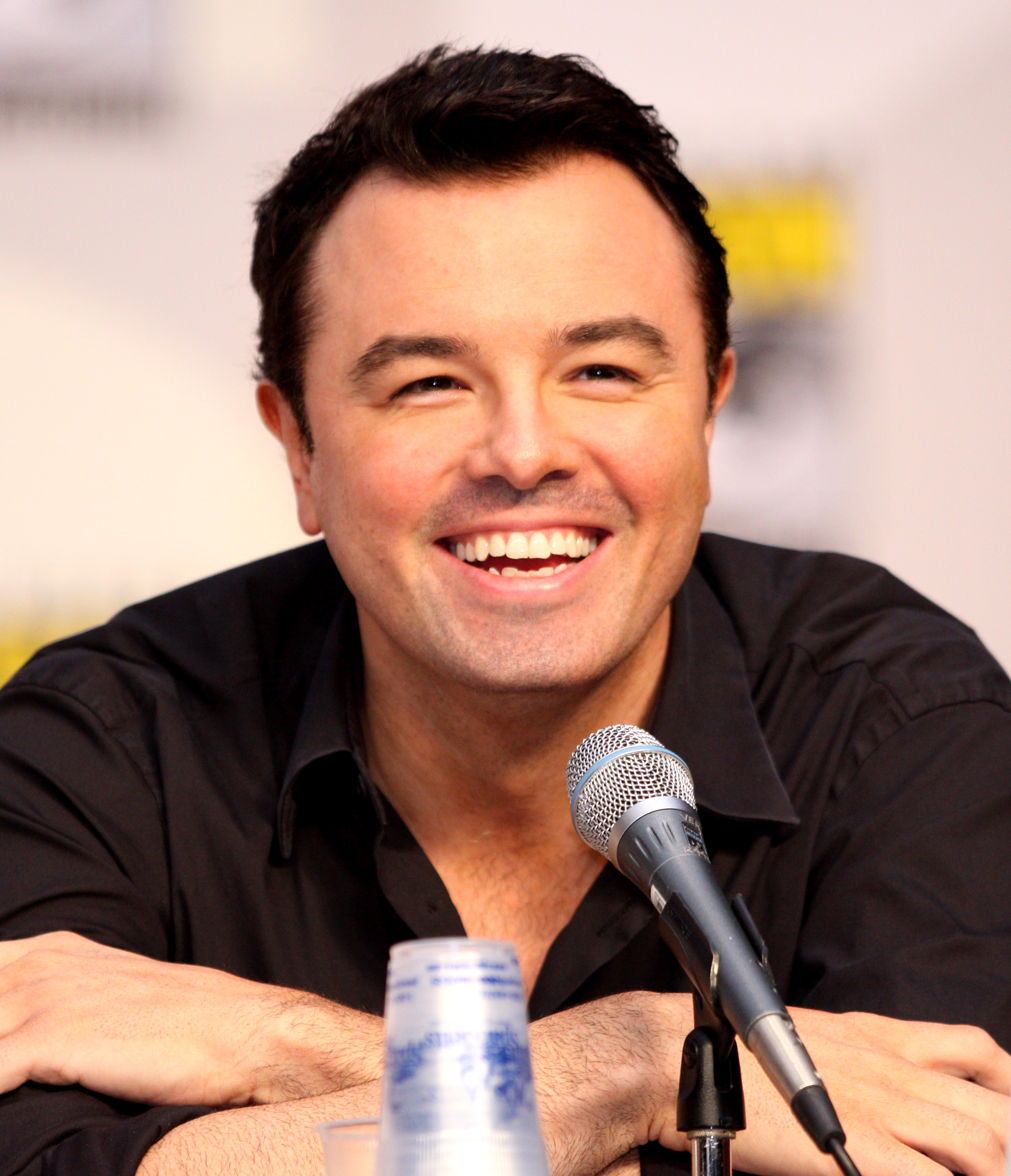
Seth MacFarlane conceived the idea for Family Guy while working on his thesis film for college.

Seth MacFarlane conceived the idea for Family Guy in 1995 while studying animation at the Rhode Island School of Design (RISD). There he created his thesis film The Life of Larry, which his professor at RISD later submitted to Hanna-Barbera; this led to MacFarlane being hired by the company. In 1996, MacFarlane created a sequel to The Life of Larry entitled Larry and Steve, which featured a middle-aged character named Larry and an intellectual dog, Steve; the short was broadcast in 1997 as one of Cartoon Network's World Premiere Toons.

Executives at Fox saw the Larry shorts and contracted MacFarlane to create a series based on the characters entitled Family Guy. Fox proposed that MacFarlane complete a 15-minute short, and gave him a budget of $50,000. Several aspects of Family Guy were inspired by the Larry shorts. While working on the series, Larry and Steve slowly evolved into Peter and Brian. After the pilot aired, the series was green-lit.

=== Crew ===
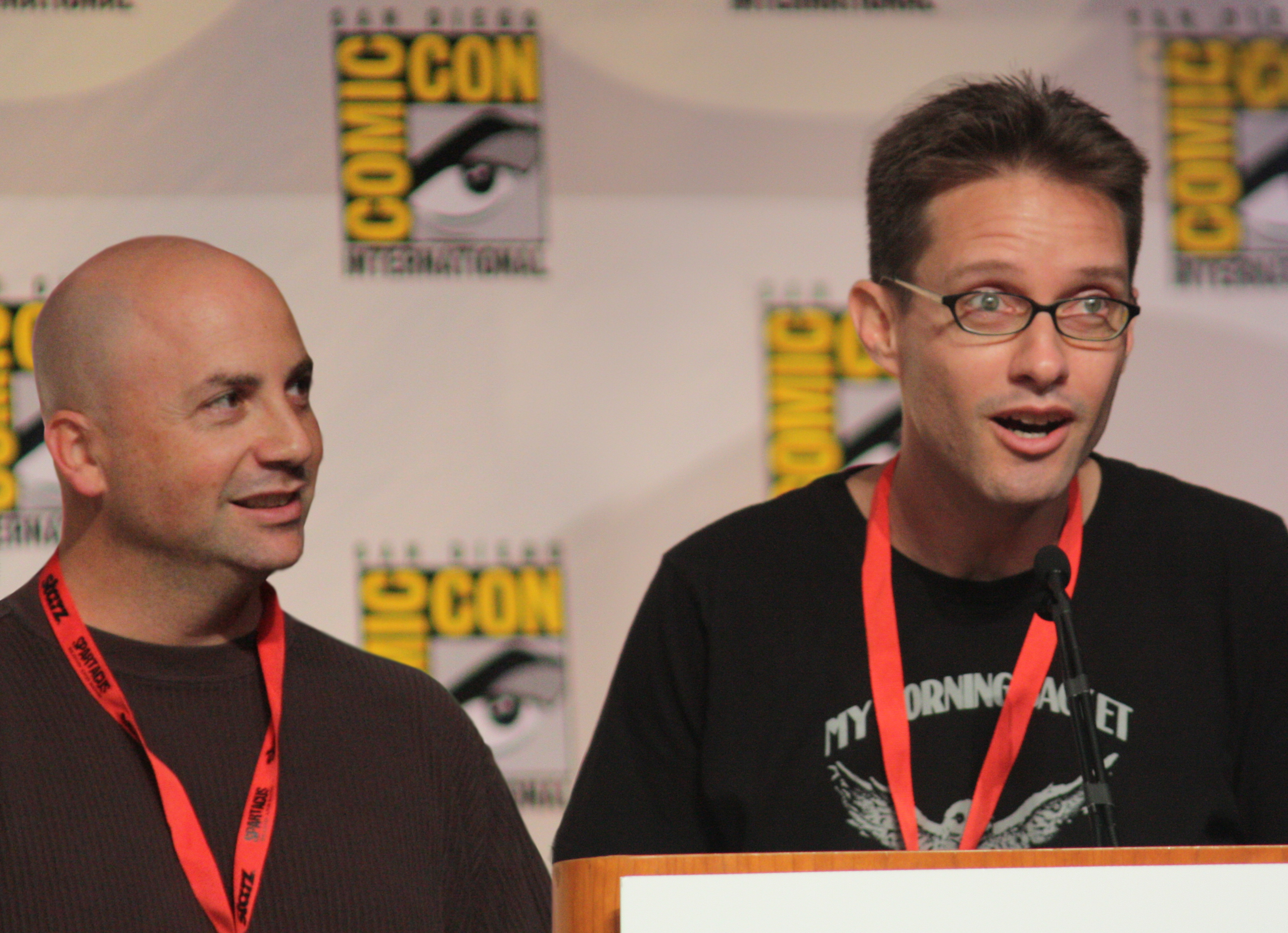
Matt Weitzman (left) and Mike Barker worked as co-producers for the season.

The season aired on Fox Broadcasting Company in the United States. David Zuckerman and MacFarlane were the executive producers for the season; the latter also acted as showrunner. The producer for the season was Sherry Gunther, with Mike Barker and Matthew Weitzman serving as co-producers. Other producers included Craig Hoffman, Danny Smith, Gary Janetti, and John Riggi.

The writing staff included MacFarlane, Chris Sheridan, Neil Goldman, Garrett Donovan, Ricky Blitt, Andrew Gormley, supervising producers Danny Smith and Gary Janetti, co-producers Matt Weitzman and Mike Barker, and voice actor Mike Henry. There were six directors for the seven episodes, with Michael DiMartino directing two. Peter Shin acted as the supervising director for the entire season. Walter Murphy composed the season's music tracks, while Stan Jones edited them.

Film Roman originally provided animation for the series for this season in production order but had cut ties from the series due to "production differences". As such, Fox Television Animation took over starting with the second season.

=== Casting ===
Season one had a cast of four main actors. MacFarlane voiced Peter Griffin, a blue-collar worker and the patriarch of the Griffin family. The family's evil-genius baby Stewie and their anthropromorphic pet dog Brian, were also voiced by MacFarlane. Other members of the family include Peter's responsible but rebellious wife Lois Griffin, voiced by Alex Borstein; their angsty and self-loathing teenage daughter Meg, voiced by Lacey Chabert; and their goofy but lovable teenage son Chris, voiced by Seth Green. Starting with the third episode of the second season, Chabert was eventually replaced by Mila Kunis for the rest of the series' run.

The season had a number of secondary characters including Lori Alan as Diane Simmons, a local news anchor; Mike Henry as Cleveland Brown, a neighbor and friend of the Griffins; Patrick Warburton as Joe Swanson, a handicapped neighbor; and Jennifer Tilly as Bonnie Swanson, Joe's pregnant wife. Other recurring characters included Carlos Alazraqui as Peter's boss Jonathan Weed, and Phil LaMarr as Ollie Williams. Cartoonist Butch Hartman voiced several minor characters.

=== Writing ===
For the first season, the writers shared a single office lent to them by the King of the Hill production crew. A majority of the writers had to agree on an episode idea before sending it to MacFarlane for approval; the concepts ultimately had to receive endorsement from Fox before production could begin. In interviews and on the DVD commentary of season one, MacFarlane explained that he is a fan of 1930s and 1940s radio programs, particularly the radio thriller anthology Suspense; thus the early episode had titles such as "Death Has a Shadow" and "Mind Over Murder". The team eventually dropped this naming convention after the novelty wore off.

== Reception ==
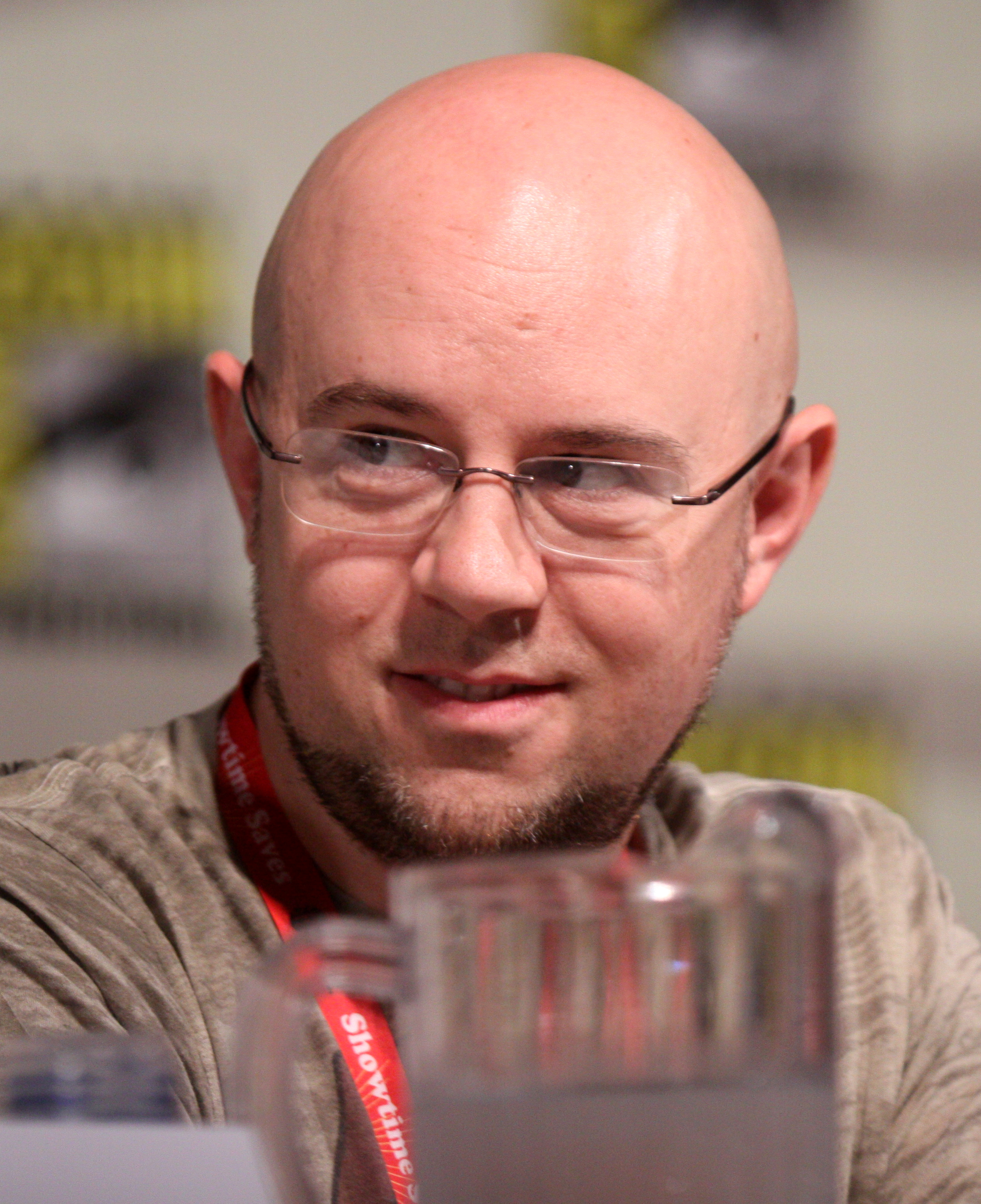
Michael Dante DiMartino directed the two best-received episodes of the season, "I Never Met the Dead Man" and "Brian: Portrait of a Dog".

The first season of Family Guy received mostly positive reviews. Ahsan Haque of IGN called the first season of Family Guy "extremely short but groundbreaking". Haque also named "Brian: Portrait of a Dog" and "I Never Met the Dead Man" as two of the best in the series. In 2008, IGN included Peter's idea of attaching a cardboard cutout of a television set around his waist from "I Never Met the Dead Man" in their list of "Peter Griffin's Top 10 Craziest Ideas". Later in 2009, they included Stewie's plan to freeze broccoli crops from the same episode in their list of "Stewie's Top 10 Most Diabolical Evil Plans". Another IGN editor, Jeremy Conrad, stated: "There aren't many shows on TV that are this sharp, or brave enough to offend everyone on the face of the planet. [...] If you find offensive humor funny, chances are you'll love this show."

David Williams from the DVD Movie Guide gave Volume One of the Family Guy a positive review, saying that the first season did well in introducing the characters of the series; he ended his review as "If you’re a fan of shows like The Simpsons, South Park, Futurama, or Married... with Children and enjoy your humor topical, dry, and with tongue firmly planted in cheek, then Family Guy is right up your alley". Aaron Beierle of DVD Talk said at the end of his review, "Often brilliant, extremely witty and darkly hilarious, Family Guy was unfortunately cancelled after Fox bumped it around six or seven different time slots. Fans of the show should definitely pick up this terrific sets [sic], while those who haven't seen it should consider giving it a look. Highly recommended". Josh Wolk of Entertainment Weekly gave volume one a B, saying that "Family Guy Volume One: Seasons 1 & 2 rips through edgy gags, TV references, and fantasy sequences (some of which are hilariously inspired), but Fox's other buffoonish family has none of The Simpsons' heart. As Homer and family have shown, a cartoon doesn't always have to be this cartoonish".

Mixed assessments came from Robin Pierson of The TV Critic, giving the season an overall mixed score of 59 out of 100. Though he praised the series as "a different kind of animated comedy which clearly sets out to do jokes which other cartoons can't do" and found "enough promise to believe the show could become really funny", he criticized the season's "slightly lame collection of flashback jokes." Pierson considered "I Never Met the Dead Man" to be the best episode of the season, and regarded "The Son Also Draws" as the season's poorest. The ending joke of "The Son Also Draws" (which consisted of Peter stating that "Canada sucks"), caused controversy with Canadian viewers. Ken Tucker gave the series a D in Entertainment Weekly, calling the animation clunky, which he said made Hanna-Barbera's animation look state-of-the-art. He also hoped that smart people would use the Family Guy half hour to turn off the television set and start a debate over the air strikes in Kosovo. The premiere of Family Guy was the Super Bowl XXXIII lead out program, achieving a total of 22.01 million viewers.

== Home media release ==
The first and second seasons were released under the title Family Guy Volume One; this standard four-disc DVD box set debuted in Region 1 on April 15, 2003. Distributed by 20th Century Fox Home Entertainment, it included several DVD extras such as episode commentaries, behind-the-scenes footage, and online promo spots. The same episodes, without the special features, were released in Region 2 on November 12, 2001, and in Region 4 on October 20, 2003.
