= I Never Met the Dead Man =

- Family Guy episode
- Peter blaming Meg for his mistake.
- Episode no.: Season 1 Episode 2
- Directed by: Michael Dante DiMartino
- Written by: Chris Sheridan
- Production code: 1ACX02
- Original air date: April 11, 1999
- Running time: 22 minutes

Guest appearances
- Butch Hartman; Aaron Lustig; Joey Slotnick; Frank Welker as Fred Jones; Erik Estrada as Officer Ponch

Episode chronology
← Previous "Death Has a Shadow"	Next → "Chitty Chitty Death Bang"
- Family Guy season 1

"I Never Met the Dead Man" is the second episode of the first season of the animated comedy series Family Guy. It originally aired on Fox in the United States on April 11, 1999, stating in a promo that it is the official series premiere of the show. The episode follows Peter Griffin as he teaches his daughter Meg how to drive. Due to his terrible advice, Meg fails her driving test, and as Peter drives her home, he crashes the car into a satellite dish, disrupting the city's cable. Peter begins to suffer from television withdrawal but finds new life in outdoor activities, driving his family to exhaustion. Meanwhile, Stewie plots to destroy the world's supply of broccoli with a weather control device so Lois cannot force him to eat the vegetable.

"I Never Met the Dead Man" was written by Chris Sheridan and directed by Michael Dante DiMartino, both firsts in the Family Guy series. Much of the episode's humor, in standard Family Guy usage, is structured around cutaway sequences that parody pop culture, including those focused on Looney Tunes, Star Trek, Wizard of Oz, ALF, Gilligan's Island, Bewitched, and Beverly Hills, 90210. The title "I Never Met the Dead Man" was derived from 1930s and 1940s radio programs, particularly the radio thriller anthology Suspense, which featured several elements pertaining to death and murder. The episode featured guest performances by Erik Estrada, Butch Hartman, Aaron Lustig and Joey Slotnick, along with several recurring voice actors for the series.

Critical responses to the episode were favorable; several television critics singled it out as among the "most memorable" episodes in the series.

== Plot ==
In a cold open, Stewie plays with his Sesame Street telephone. As the phone says to count to three, Stewie uses his laser gun to destroy the phone three times.

Annoyed that Peter spends more time watching television than with his own family, Lois suggests that he teach Meg how to drive. Peter reluctantly agrees and unwittingly gives Meg a list of lousy driving tips, including instructing her to "rev" her engine twice at traffic lights and challenge other drivers to a race, which causes her to eventually fail her driving test. As Peter drives her home from the DMV, he notices that a show he wanted to watch is on television in a nearby house. Distracted by the show, he crashes the car into the main cable television transmitter, breaking out reception for the entire town of Quahog. As Peter and Meg realize this, angry citizens of Quahog approach. In response, Peter promises Meg that if she takes the blame for breaking the cable transmitter, she will get a new convertible when she finally gets her license. Once they arrive home with the transmitter still attached to the car, Lois becomes furious with Peter for placing the blame on his daughter. At school, Meg is publicly blamed by her teacher for the broken transmitter and is about to admit the truth, but she decides to keep quiet to get the convertible, reflecting with an inner voice, a reference to The Wonder Years. Meanwhile, Stewie (seeing the opportunity of the dish attached to the car), steals the satellite dish in a plan to create a weather control device capable of destroying the world's supply of broccoli, since Lois had forced him to eat the vegetable earlier that day.

Suffering withdrawal syndrome from the lack of cable, Peter straps a television-sized cardboard cutout to himself, making it appear as though his entire world is a television program. When Meg cannot deal with the public scorn, she reveals that her father is truly responsible for Quahog's loss of television, causing the town to turn against him. To save Peter from further scorn and verbal attacks, Lois gives a heartfelt speech to the community about how television has kept them all from enjoying one another. Inspired by the speech, Peter drags the family to one outdoor activity after another, which quickly exhausts them. Once the family cannot keep up with him, Peter decides to go off with William Shatner, who has appeared on the Griffin family's doorstep after experiencing a flat tire, to a nearby festival. Meanwhile, Stewie's weather machine creates a huge storm. The storm's lightning strike destroys Stewie's weather machine and blows Stewie off the roof and onto the ground. While Meg is practicing driving with Lois, the storm causes her to accidentally hit Shatner and Peter, killing Shatner and hospitalizing Peter. As her father recovers, in a full-body cast, he is forced to watch television, causing him to become addicted once again, much to his family's relief.

During the credits, Stewie tries (and fails) to fake having eaten his broccoli while pouring it onto Brian's plate.

== Production ==
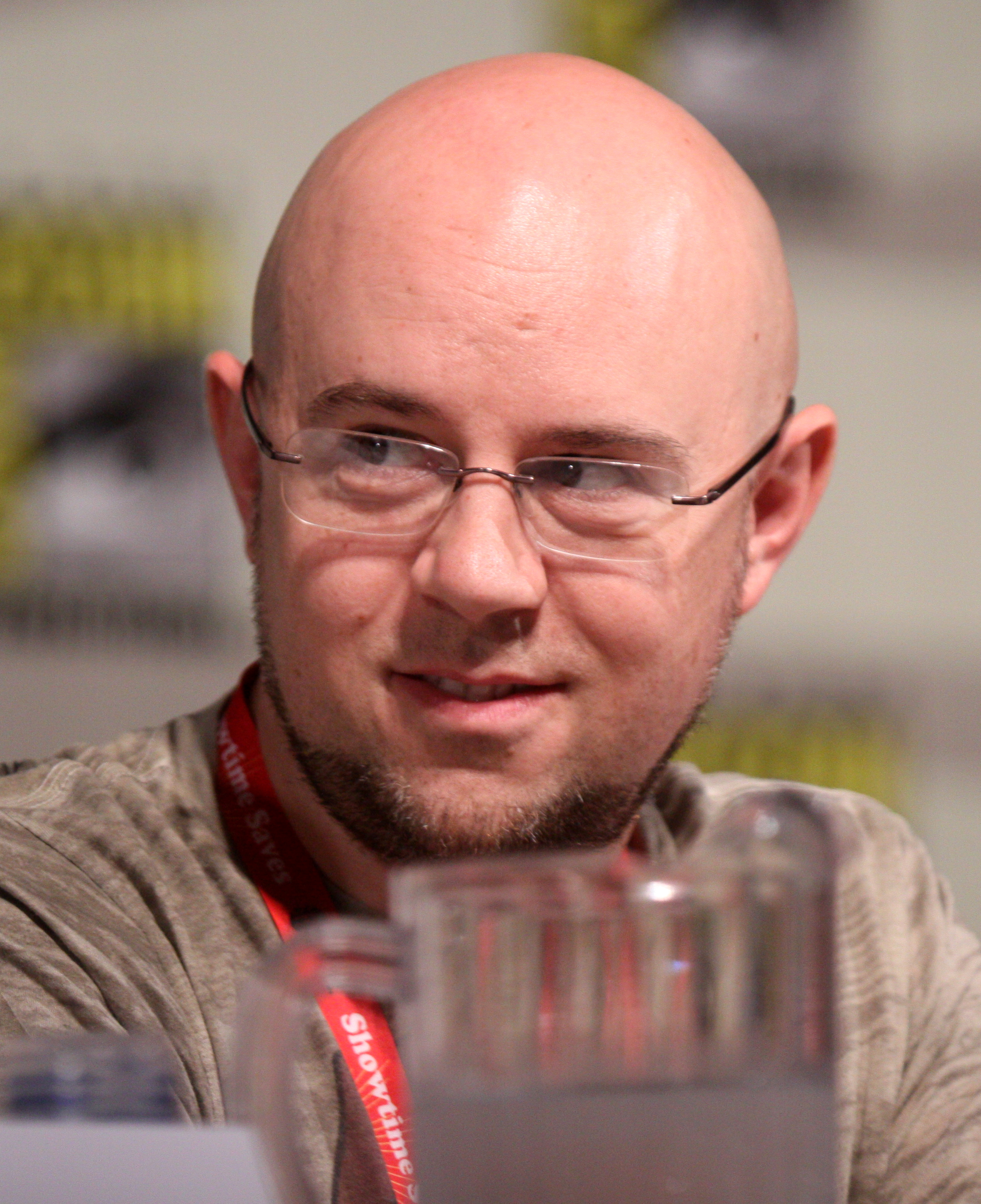
Michael Dante DiMartino directed the episode

"I Never Met the Dead Man" was the first episode of Family Guy for both writer Chris Sheridan and director Michael Dante DiMartino. For the first months of production, the writers shared one office lent to them by the King of the Hill production crew. As with the remaining first four episodes of the season, the title of the episode was derived from 1930s and 1940s radio programs, particularly the radio thriller anthology "Suspense", which featured several elements pertaining to death and murder. This convention was later dropped following the fourth episode of the season. In addition to the regular cast, actor Erik Estrada, writer and animator Butch Hartman, actor Aaron Lustig, actor Joey Slotnick and voice actor Frank Welker guest starred in the episode; Welker's role, as Fred Jones from Scooby-Doo, was a bit of stunt casting on the show's part, especially with the non-kid-friendly line "we're dealing with one sick son of a bitch". Recurring guest voice actress Lori Alan also made minor appearances. The episode originally aired on April 11, 1999, nearly three months after the series premiere.

== Cultural references ==
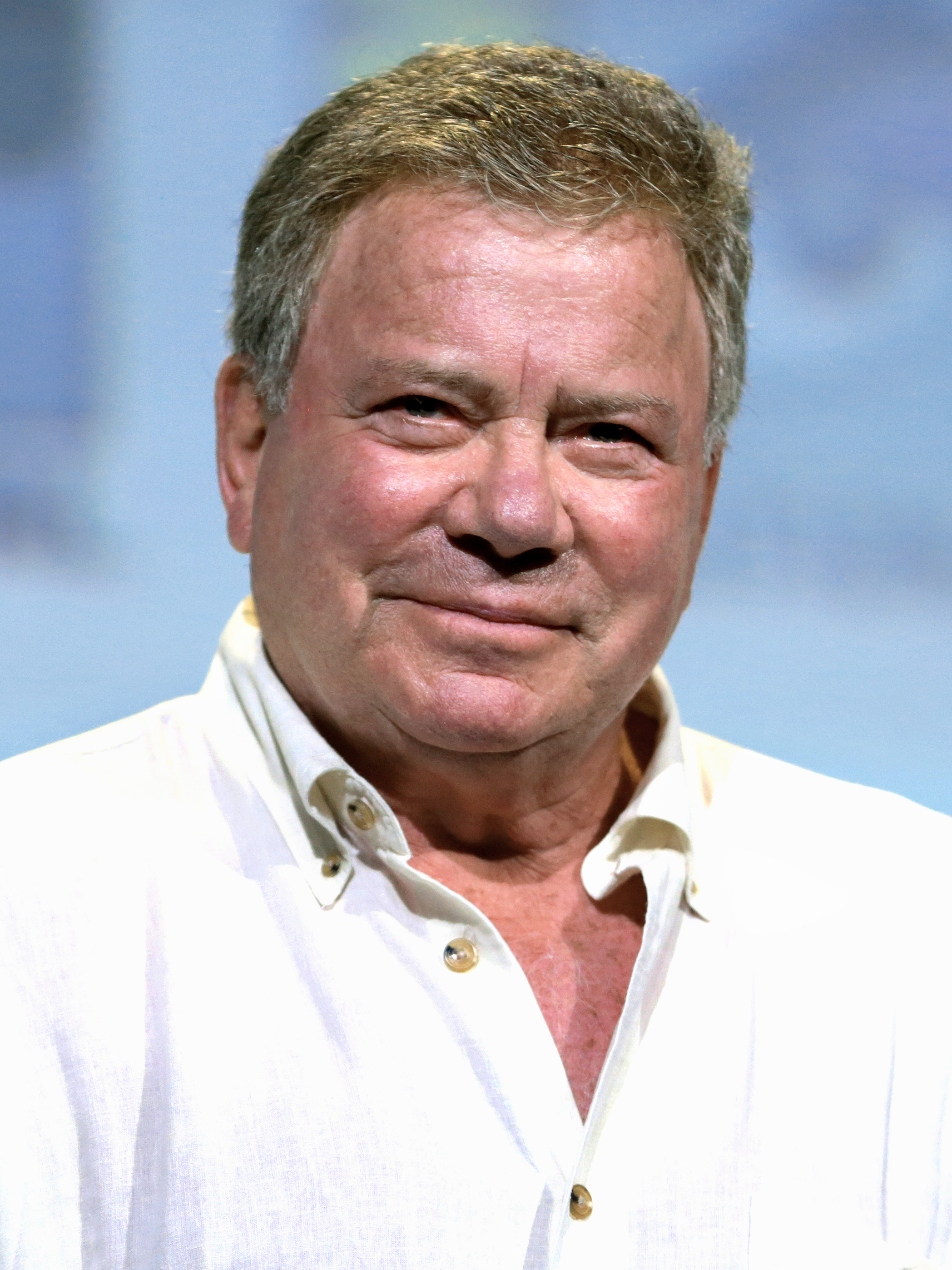
An animated likeness of actor William Shatner was featured in the episode.

When Meg asks her mother to help teach her how to drive, Lois suggests Peter take her driving instead. With Peter refusing in order to continue watching an episode of Star Trek, actor William Shatner, as portrayed by series creator Seth MacFarlane, then appears on the screen.

Going on to suggest her father is not the best driver, Brian recalls a previous driving incident Peter had with Wile E. Coyote, in which he accidentally ran over the Road Runner in the middle of the desert. When Peter becomes concerned about the "ostrich" he just hit, Wile E. tells him to keep going.

In school, when Meg is about to confess that her father was actually the one who crashed the car, she reflects with an inner voice, a reference to the 1990s hit TV show The Wonder Years.

Continuing to suffer a withdrawal from not being able to watch television, Peter has a Wizard of Oz-inspired nightmare featuring Alf from the 1986 NBC sitcom ALF, Gilligan from the 1964 CBS series Gilligan's Island, The Robot from Lost in Space, and Jeannie from I Dream of Jeannie, who promptly transforms into Samantha from the 1964 ABC series Bewitched.

After creating a cardboard cutout in the shape of a television, Peter walks around town with the contraption strapped to his waist, perceiving the actions around him as television. Two women talking over lunch suggests that he is watching the television station Lifetime, two elderly people out walking reminds him of CBS, a group of Black people playing basketball suggests UPN, and James Woods High School reminds him of Beverly Hills, 90210.

After TV service is restored and most of the Griffin family is watching Star Trek, James T. Kirk tells his crew that there is a dangerous mission in that someone will surely be killed. He explains the landing party will consist of himself, Mr. Spock, Dr. McCoy, and Ensign Ricky (a redshirt), who, upon being called, cynically says "Oh crap!", due to the television trope of oft-related instances of redshirt ensigns being killed on the show. At the end of the episode, after Meg accidentally hits and kills Shatner with the Griffin family car, the group of people looking over includes the actor who played Ensign Ricky, stating, "Wow, I did not see that one coming." The Star Trek scene in the episode is an almost shot for shot recreation of a scene that appeared in MacFarlane's thesis film The Life of Larry.

== Reception ==
Reviews for the episode were generally favorable. A 2008 review of the episode by Ahsan Haque of IGN was positive, calling the storyline involving Stewie "elaborate [and] creative." He gave the episode a perfect score of ten, calling it one of the most "memorable" episodes in the entire series. Haque went on to note that "the tightly woven and hilarious storyline, combined with a constant barrage of cleverly inserted random jokes, and some truly unique imagery help make this episode one of the finest in the series. This is Family Guy at its best, and definitely sets a very high bar for animated comedy." Robin Pierson of The TV Critic rated the episode a 70 out of 100, making it the highest-rated episode of Family Guy on the site. Pierson described the episode as "a really fun twenty two minutes of television. There are so many jokes to enjoy and they are more focused than the pilot", in particular praising the Fast Animals, Slow Children sequence.

In 2008, Haque later listed Stewie's plan to freeze broccoli crops as number one on his list of "Stewie's Top 10 Most Diabolical Evil Plans" and placed Peter's idea to pretend the world is a television program by attaching a cardboard cutout of a television set around his waist in sixth place on his list of "Peter Griffin's Top 10 Craziest Ideas".
