= Brian: Portrait of a Dog =

- Family Guy episode
- Episode no.: Season 1 Episode 7
- Directed by: Michael Dante DiMartino
- Written by: Gary Janetti
- Production code: 1ACX07
- Original air date: May 16, 1999

Guest appearances
- Lori Alan as Diane Simmons; Butch Hartman; Rachael MacFarlane; Dick Van Patten as Thomas Bradford; Mary Scheer as Mary Bradford; Joey Slotnick; Wally Wingert

Episode chronology
← Previous "The Son Also Draws"	Next → "Peter, Peter, Caviar Eater"
- Family Guy season 1

"Brian: Portrait of a Dog" is the seventh and final episode of the first season of the animated comedy series Family Guy. It originally aired on Fox in the United States on May 16, 1999. The episode features anthropomorphic dog Brian after he swallows his pride and joins a dog show, after much convincing, in order to win money for a new air conditioner. But after an argument with his owner, Peter Griffin, over a trick gone bad, Brian realizes he is a second-class citizen and runs away from home, landing him in the pound on death row. Desperate to save their dog, the Griffin family attempts to release Brian and prevent him from being euthanized.

The episode was written by Gary Janetti and directed by Michael Dante DiMartino. It received praise from television critic Ahsan Haque for its storyline and use of cultural references. The episode featured guest performances by Butch Hartman, Rachael MacFarlane, Dick Van Patten, Mary Scheer, Joey Slotnick and Wally Wingert, along with several recurring voice actors for the series.

== Plot ==
Quahog is in the grip of an unusual heatwave and, not having air conditioning, the Griffins are suffering. Peter learns of an upcoming dog show offering a top prize of $500, which he sees as the perfect way to be able to buy an air conditioner. He persuades a reluctant Brian to participate. Brian performs his tricks at the dog show. Peter puts a bone biscuit on Brian's nose; finding this demeaning and becoming angry, Brian refuses to "perpetuate the stereotype of the 'good dog'", as well as Peter saying he is embarrassed that Brian would not comply. Brian subsequently exits in a huff.

On the way home, Peter and Brian argue until Brian gets out of the car. A police officer gives Brian a ticket, for which Peter has to pay $10, for violating the local leash law, which only widens the rift between Peter and Brian. Another argument ensues, and Peter mentions that he found Brian on the road as a stray dog. Angry that Peter brought that up and becoming angrier when Peter then demands that Brian stop being a bad dog, Brian leaves the house, whereupon he is treated cruelly by the community, and is ultimately forced to sleep at the bus shelter. Peter buys a new pet, a cat, which turns out to be troublesome and abusive; the family gets rid of it and searches for Brian. By the time Peter decides to apologize to Brian, Brian has been kicked out of a restaurant and a public store and chased by the police when he was found drinking from a water fountain. Brian becomes homeless, having actually attacked a man on the street for treating him as a drunken hobo and for not believing that he was not a good dog but a crazy animal. He is subsequently captured by the police.

A social worker announces to Brian and the rest of his family that Brian is sentenced to death by lethal injection, which shocks everyone. While Peter works on Brian's appeal, Brian decides to study the law as much as he can, and goes to court to defend himself, and finally gets the chance to plead his case before the Quahog City Council. During his parole hearing, he references the court case Plessy v. Ferguson, but unfortunately for him, the council believes that it is stupid to listen to a dog. Just when Brian is about to be dismissed, Peter steps in and delivers a last-ditch emotional appeal on his behalf. The city council members remain unmoved until Peter bribes them with $20 each, and Brian is immediately freed. The charges against him are finally dropped, and the town shows him new respect, allowing him to finally drink out of a water fountain, showing his status to be the same as that of the other citizens of the community. The family returns home, and Stewie, in a display of respect towards Brian, bows ever so slightly towards him. Brian and Peter are then left alone. Brian licks Peter's face in an endearing dog gesture, but threatens to kill him if he ever tells anyone about it.

== Production ==
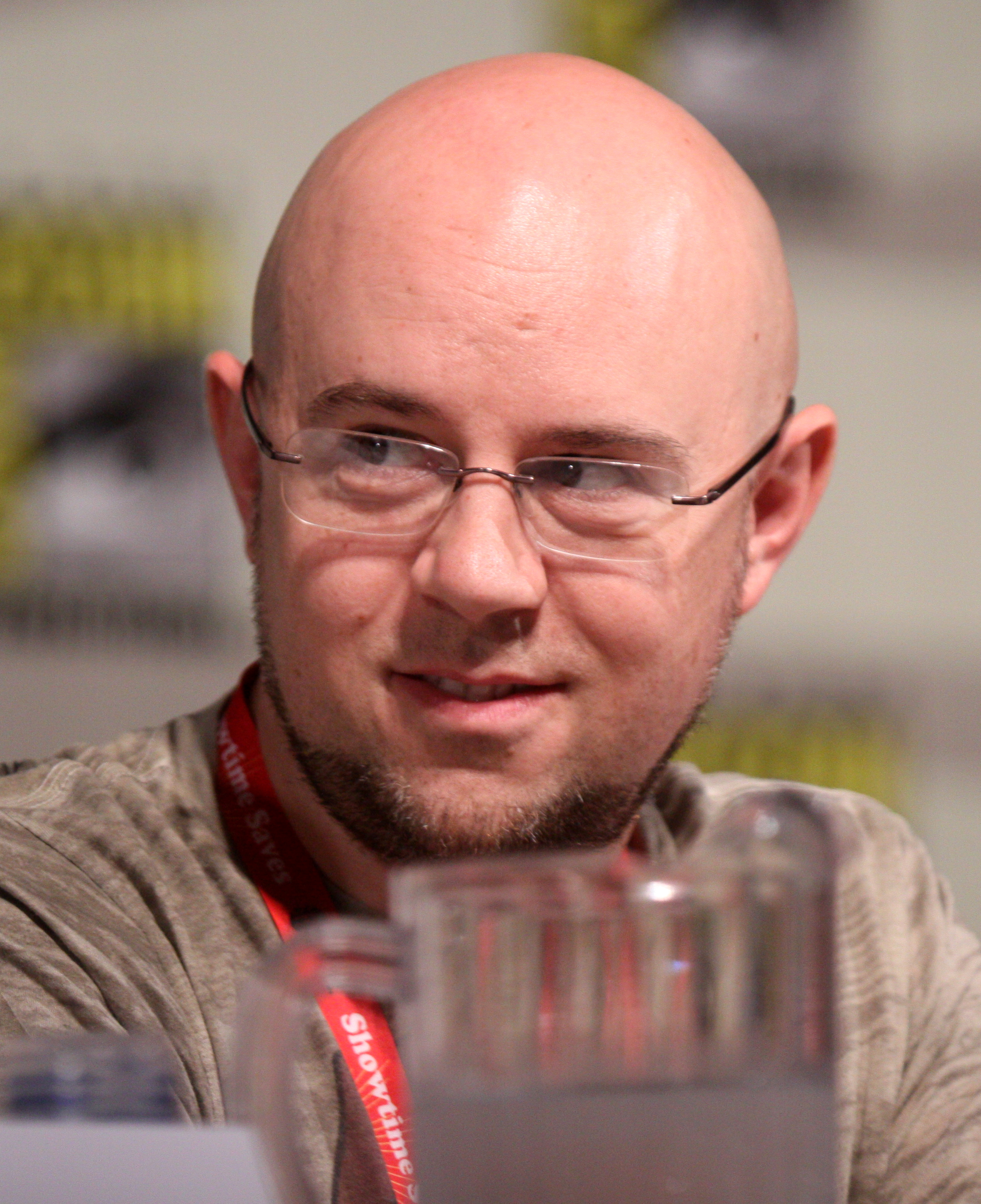
Michael Dante DiMartino directed the episode

"Brian: Portrait of a Dog" was written by Gary Janetti, his first time writing for the series, and directed by former King of the Hill director Michael Dante DiMartino, who was a newcomer to the show at the time, having directed "I Never Met the Dead Man". DiMartino would later go on to co-create and produce Avatar: The Last Airbender with Bryan Konietzko at Nickelodeon Animation Studios. Roy Allen Smith and Peter Shin (who have been supervising other episodes of the show), acted as supervising directors. Mike Henry, Andrew Gormley, Neil Goldman and Garrett Donovan worked in the episode as story editors and staff writers. Series creator Seth MacFarlane, David Zuckerman, Lolee Aries, David Pritchard and Mike Wolf worked as executive producers, while Craig Hoffman, Danny Smith and Gary Janetti worked as supervising producers. In addition to the regular cast, the episode featured the voices of actress and comedian Mary Scheer, actors Dick Van Patten, Joey Slotnick, and actress and sister of show creator Seth MacFarlane, Rachael MacFarlane. Recurring guest voice actors included actress Lori Alan, writer and animator Butch Hartman, and voice actor Wally Wingert.

== Cultural references ==
The episode makes references to the U.S. civil rights movement. While arguing his case before the city council, Brian tries to reference the landmark U.S. Supreme Court case Plessy v. Ferguson, before being cut off. Another reference comes after Brian is freed, he drinks from a drinking fountain in a defiant manner, a reference to the 1974 television movie, The Autobiography of Miss Jane Pittman. Other media references include the Griffins watching the TV show Eight Is Enough and Peter writing a letter to MacGyver, from the titular show, asking him to rescue Brian from jail. When Brian puts eye drops into his eyes before the dog show, he says "Showtime" with jazz hands. This ritual and phrase are a reference to Joe Gideon in All That Jazz.

== Reception ==
Ahsan Haque of IGN rated the episode a 9.6/10, praising the random jokes and calling it "yet another finely crafted early episode that tells a great cohesive story, has some great random jokes, and throws in a bucket of social satire for good measure. This was also the final episode of the extremely short but groundbreaking first season, and definitely ranks amongst the best in the series."

"Portrait of a Dog", along with the twenty-seven other episodes from Family Guy's first and second season, were released on a 4-disc DVD set in the U.S. on April 15, 2003. The sets included brief audio commentaries by Seth MacFarlane and various crew and cast members for several episodes. It also features French and Spanish versions of the episodes, an alteration of an episode, and deleted scenes of some episodes.
