= Death Has a Shadow =

- Family Guy episode
- The Griffin family watches television together in their first appearance. The top image is from MacFarlane’s hand-drawn pilot, while the bottom image is from the completed episode.
- Episode no.: Season 1 Episode 1
- Directed by: Peter Shin; Seth MacFarlane (pilot)
- Produced by: Jim Keeshen (pilot)
- Written by: Seth MacFarlane
- Production code: 1ACX01
- Original air date: January 31, 1999
- Running time: 16 minutes (pilot); 22 minutes (episode)

Guest appearances
- Lori Alan as Diane Simmons; Carlos Alazraqui as Mr. Weed; Phil LaMarr as Judge; Butch Hartman as various characters; Billy West as Church Father; Fred Tatasciore as John Madden; Joey Slotnick as Dick Clark/various characters; Wally Wingert as Pat Summerall

Episode chronology
| ← Previous — | Next → "I Never Met the Dead Man" |
- Family Guy season 1

"Death Has a Shadow" is the series premiere and the first episode of the first season of the American animated television series Family Guy. Written by series creator Seth MacFarlane and directed by Peter Shin, the episode aired as a sneak peek on Fox in the United States on January 31, 1999, following Super Bowl XXXIII. In the episode, Peter loses his job after drinking too much at a stag party and falling asleep at work. He signs up for welfare to keep his wife, Lois, from finding out, but receives far more money than he expected. After spending the money recklessly, Lois discovers the truth, prompting Peter to dump the remaining cash from a blimp at the Super Bowl. He is arrested for welfare fraud and must await rescue from his family, alongside various performers who would later become recurring and guest voice actors on the series.

The episode was the first overall episode to be animated by Film Roman, Inc. and Sunwoo Digital International through its animation division, Grimsaem Animation Co.

The basis for "Death Has a Shadow", as well as Family Guy as a whole, was MacFarlane’s thesis film The Life of Larry, created in 1995 while he was a student at the Rhode Island School of Design. A sequel, titled Larry & Steve, was conceived in 1996 and aired in 1997 as a segment of Cartoon Network’s World Premiere Toons. Both shorts caught the attention of Fox, which contacted MacFarlane in 1998 to develop a series based on the films. A hand-drawn pilot was created by MacFarlane with a budget of $50,000, leading to the series being accepted for production and the pilot being remade and expanded into its broadcast form.

Critical responses to the episode were mostly positive. According to Nielsen ratings, it was viewed by 22 million viewers during its original airing in the United States. In the tenth-season episode "Back to the Pilot", which premiered on November 13, 2011, Stewie and Brian travel back in time to the events of this episode.

== Plot ==
As Lois prepares dinner, Stewie puts the final touches on his mind control device, only for it to be taken away from him by Lois, who will not allow "toys" at the table. Later, Peter asks Lois for permission to attend an upcoming stag party. After he promises he will not drink alcohol, Lois allows him to go. However, Peter forgets his promise to Lois and plays the drinking game "Drink the Beer". He goes to work the next day with a hangover and falls asleep on the job as a safety inspector in a toy factory. Peter misses dangerous objects such as a butcher knife, a surge protector, a gasoline can, razor blades, a porcupine and a toaster with forks inside. The company receives bad press after releasing unsafe toy products, and Peter is promptly fired by Mr. Weed.

At dinner, Peter breaks the news to his children but hides it from Lois. He tries different jobs, such as cereal mascot and sneeze guard, but fails miserably. Brian pressures him to tell her the truth, but all he manages to do is to tell Lois how fat she is. Brian insists that Peter must look out for his family's welfare. With the word "welfare" in his mind, Peter soon applies for government assistance at a welfare office; however, a processing error creates a weekly check for $150,000. Telling Lois he received a big raise, Peter spends his money on many foolish and extravagant things, such as renting the Statue of David, treating Meg to cosmetic surgery and even going so far as to surround his house with a moat to protect them from the Black Knight.

However, Lois discovers the truth when she is given the welfare check by the mail lady. With Lois angry at him, Peter decides to return the money to the taxpayers by dumping it from a blimp during Super Bowl XXXIII with Brian. After the commotion they cause, they are immediately shot down.

Eventually, Peter must stand trial for the welfare fraud, and Lois goes to the courthouse for his hearing, still angry at Peter for lying to her in the first place. After Peter apologizes for lying to Lois and accepting the money instead of reporting the welfare error, the judge sentences him to 24 months. Lois tries to explain that he is not that bad, and she loves him and insists that, no matter what, she will always stand by her husband. The judge agrees and sends her to jail with him. Stewie, knowing that he is dependent on his parents despite his hatred for them, admits he cannot allow them to go to prison, and whips out his mind control device, using it on the judge and forcing him into letting his father go free and giving him his job back.

Back at home, Peter states that he has learned his lesson and will never commit welfare fraud again. Instead, he is going to try for such things as a minority scholarship, a sexual harassment suit, and a disability claim, much to his family's disapproval.

== Background ==
MacFarlane initially conceived Family Guy in 1995 while studying animation under the Rhode Island School of Design (RISD). During college, he created his thesis film entitled The Life of Larry, which was later submitted by his professor at RISD to Hanna-Barbera, which led to MacFarlane being hired by the company. In 1996, MacFarlane created a sequel to The Life of Larry entitled Larry & Steve, which featured a middle-aged character named Larry and an intellectual dog, Steve. The short was broadcast in 1997 as one of Cartoon Network's World Premiere Toons.

In 1997, MacFarlane planned to develop the Larry shorts into a short film series for MADtv; however, the project was abandoned because the show did not possess a large enough budget to make any kind of animation. As development continued, the genre gradually shifted to a prime-time series, while the characters of Larry and Steve formed the basis for Peter and Brian, respectively. During the year, a Hanna-Barbera development executive introduced MacFarlane to alternative comedians Mike Darnell and Leslie Collins in an attempt to get Hanna-Barbera back into the prime-time business. The executives were unimpressed; a year later, MacFarlane contacted Collins at Fox; she arranged a meeting with him and the company executives to create a series based on the characters entitled Family Guy.

Fox proposed MacFarlane complete a 16-minute short and gave him a budget of $50,000. After the pilot aired, the series was green-lit, with King of the Hill writer and executive producer David Zuckerman to develop the show along with (and also acting as the show's executive producer). Premises were drawn from several 1980s Saturday-morning cartoons MacFarlane had watched as a child, such as The Fonz and the Happy Days Gang and Rubik, the Amazing Cube.

A cut-down seven-minute version of the original pilot was released on the Volume 2 DVD as a bonus feature. The full 16-minute version was unavailable and considered lost until March 20, 2025, when an Internet user named "GhostTheDeadGirl" found the full pilot on the personal portfolio website of Robert Paulson, an animator and designer who worked on the pilot. It was originally uploaded to his site in September 2022, but went completely unnoticed for over 2 1/2 years prior to its discovery. It would be reuploaded to YouTube and shared elsewhere on the Internet the following day.

== Production ==
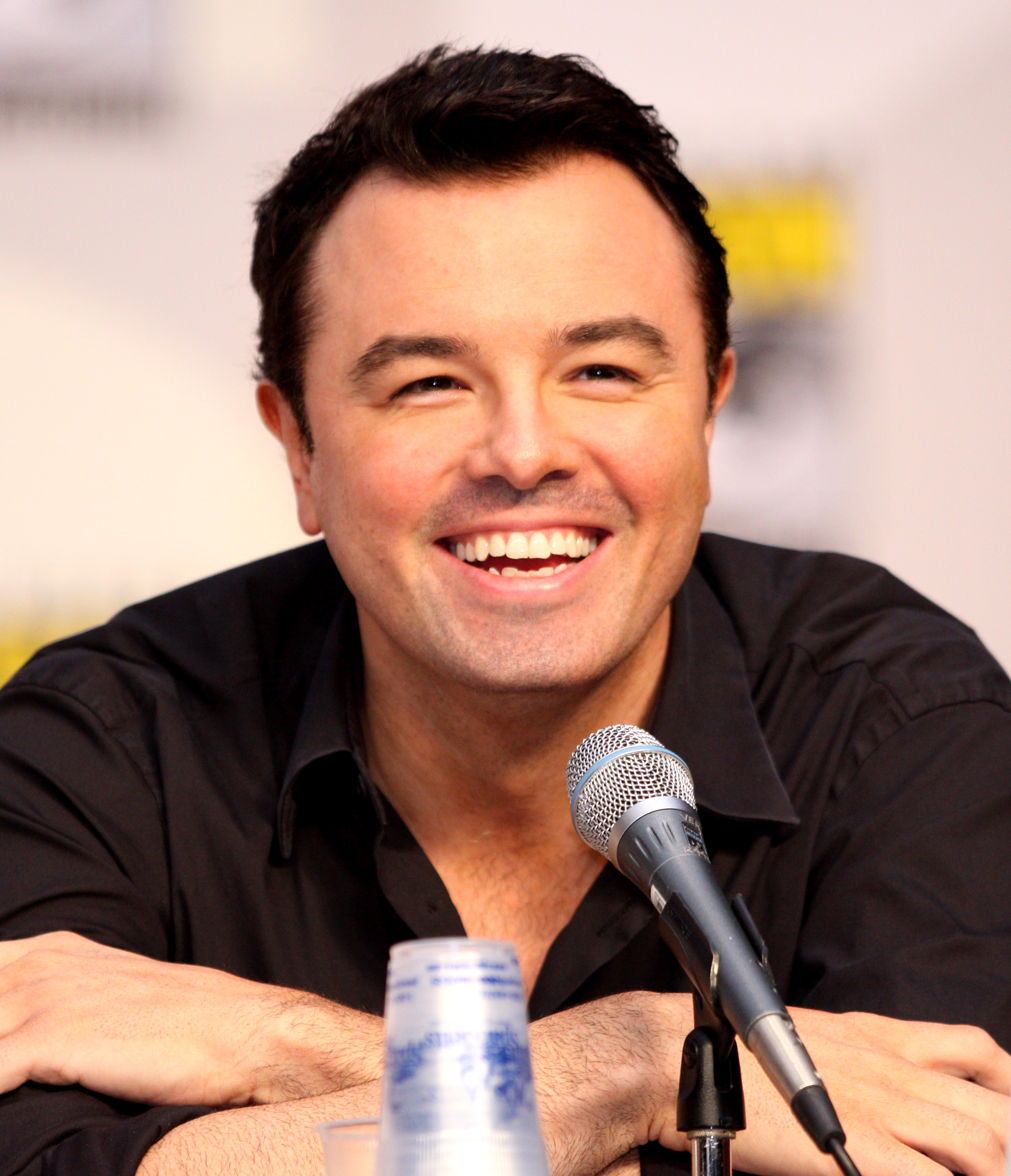
Family Guy creator Seth MacFarlane wrote the episode.

Production of the pilot for Family Guy began in 1998, and took six months. Recalling the experience in an interview with The New York Times, MacFarlane stated,

I spent about six months with no sleep and no life, just drawing like crazy in my kitchen and doing this pilot.

— Seth MacFarlane, interview with The New York Times

Upon completion of the pilot, the series went on the air. "Death Has a Shadow" was the first episode of Family Guy to be aired. It was written by creator MacFarlane and was the first episode to be directed by Peter Shin. The episode guest-starred Lori Alan as Diane Simmons, Carlos Alazraqui as Mr. Weed, Mike Henry as Cleveland Brown, Billy West, Fred Tatasciore, Joey Slotnick, Phil LaMarr, Wally Wingert, and fellow cartoonist Butch Hartman. The episode aired after Super Bowl XXXIII on January 31, 1999.

For "Death Has a Shadow", several changes were made from the original pilot pitch. For the series, Lois was a redhead, as opposed to the original pilot, where she was a blonde. In the original pilot, Lois discovered that Peter lost his job, and by the end of the episode, he fails to get a new one, nor does he apply for welfare. The idea for Peter to apply for welfare and unintentionally become wealthy was suggested by executive producer David Zuckerman, who suggested the idea in order to add a larger amount of plot to the episode. Several sequences and gags were integrated into the episode from creator MacFarlane's 1995 thesis film The Life of Larry, including the sequence where the Griffin family sees Philadelphia, and a brief cutaway where Peter farts for the first time at the age of 30.

MacFarlane was cast as four of the show's main characters: Peter Griffin, Brian Griffin, Stewie Griffin, and Glenn Quagmire. MacFarlane chose to voice these characters himself, believing it would be easier to portray the voices he already envisioned than for someone else to attempt it. MacFarlane drew inspiration for the voice of Peter from a security guard he overheard talking while attending the Rhode Island School of Design. Stewie's voice was based on the voice of English actor Rex Harrison, especially his performance in the 1964 musical My Fair Lady. MacFarlane uses his regular speaking voice when playing Brian. The voice of Quagmire was inspired by fast-speaking radio advertising spokesmen from the 1950s. MacFarlane also provides voices for various other recurring and one-time characters, including news anchor Tom Tucker and Lois' father Carter Pewterschmidt.

Alex Borstein was cast as Lois Griffin, Tricia Takanawa, Loretta Brown, and Lois' mother Barbara Pewterschmidt. Borstein was asked to provide a voice for the original pilot while she was working on MADtv. She had not met MacFarlane or seen any of his artwork and said it was "really sight unseen". At the time, Borstein performed in a stage show in Los Angeles, in which she played a redheaded mother whose voice she had based on one of her cousins. The voice was originally slower, but when MacFarlane heard it, he replied "Make it a little less [...] annoying...and speed it up, or every episode will last four hours". Seth Green was chosen to play Chris Griffin and Neil Goldman. Green stated that he did an impression of the "Buffalo Bill" character from the thriller film The Silence of the Lambs during his audition. His main inspiration for Chris' voice came from envisioning how "Buffalo Bill" would sound if he were speaking through a public address system at a McDonald's. Lacey Chabert was cast as Meg Griffin. Chabert voiced Meg Griffin for the first production season (15 episodes), but due to a contractual agreement was never credited. Chabert left the series because of time conflicts with schoolwork and her role on Party of Five, and was replaced by That '70s Show star Mila Kunis for the remainder of the series.

== Reception ==
"Another surreal and imaginative running gag involves Peter's attack of conscience. The devil on his shoulder instructs him to keep lying but when he turns to hear the angel's perspective no one appears. We cut to the small angel stuck in traffic on the conscience's highway. Later in the show the conscience arrives and Peter seeks his advice. So the small angel gets advice from the small devil on his shoulder and then turns to his other shoulder and again no angel appears. Cut to an even smaller angel stuck in traffic. Pretty memorable".

— Robin Pierson, TV Critic describing his favorite joke of the episode

The episode has received mostly positive reviews from television critics. In a 2008 review, Ahsan Haque of IGN rated the episode an 8.9/10, praising the integration of humor into the episode's storyline. Haque noted that the episode was "a very strong start to this long running classic series, and revisiting it serves as a reminder that, unlike many other television shows, there are very few awkward moments, and much of the show's brilliance is immediately apparent." In 2009, the site singled out "Death Has a Shadow" as a "strong start [to Family Guy]".

Robin Pierson of The TV Critic gave the episode a mixed review, rating the episode a 67/100, calling it one of the most densely packed pilots on television. He mentioned that it was entertaining but said that there were many jokes that followed the quality-does-not-win-out-over-quantity saying. He compared Peter to Homer Simpson, and he compared the show to The Simpsons and King of the Hill. He criticized the amount of unfunny jokes while praising the surreal moments. At the end of his review he stated that Family Guy was a different kind of animated comedy which set out to do jokes that other cartoons couldn't do, also mentioning that the show had promised to become really funny.

A more negative review came from Entertainment Weekly's Ken Tucker, who called the animation clunky, which he said made Hanna-Barbera's animation look state-of-the-art. Tucker also said in his review that he hoped that smart people would use the Family Guy half-hour to turn off the television set and start a debate over the air strikes in Kosovo. He also called the show "The Simpsons as conceived by a singularly sophomoric mind that lacks any reference point beyond other TV shows". Even before it aired the pilot had received some criticism from the Parents Television Council, a watchdog; the creator of this website, L. Brent Bozell III, wrote that he initially speculated that Family Guy would be "pushing the envelope". The episode was watched by 22 million people after the Super Bowl.

In December 2024, the Hong Kong-based airline Cathay Pacific removed the episode from its in-flight entertainment system following a social media complaint regarding a cutaway gag parodying Tank Man during the 1989 Tiananmen Square protests, due to the political sensitivity of the event in China. The airline subsequently issued an apology, stating that the program's content did not represent the company's standpoint.
