= The Son Also Draws =

- Family Guy episode
- Episode no.: Season 1 Episode 6
- Directed by: Neil Affleck
- Written by: Ricky Blitt
- Production code: 1ACX06
- Original air date: May 9, 1999

Guest appearances
- Suzie Plakson; Kevin Michael Richardson as Howard Cunningham; Fred Tatasciore as Fonzie; Wally Wingert; Bobby Slayton as Leonard Cornfeathers

Episode chronology
| ← Previous "A Hero Sits Next Door" | Next → "Brian: Portrait of a Dog" |
- Family Guy season 1

"The Son Also Draws" is the sixth and penultimate episode of the first season of the animated comedy series Family Guy. It originally aired on Fox in the United States on May 9, 1999. The episode follows Chris as he is ejected from the Youth Scouts, and Peter drives the family to Scout headquarters to get him readmitted. During a rest stop at a Native American casino, Lois gambles away the family car. Peter pretends to be a member of the tribe in an attempt to get it back, and is sent on a vision quest to prove his heritage, giving him and Chris an opportunity to bond.

"The Son Also Draws" was written by Ricky Blitt and directed by Neil Affleck, both working on their first Family Guy episode. The episode guest starred actors Suzie Plakson, Kevin Michael Richardson, Fred Tatasciore and Wally Wingert. Recurring guest voice actors included writer and animator Butch Hartman and actor Patrick Bristow. Much of the episode's humor is structured around cutaway sequences that parody popular culture, including references to Speed Racer, Happy Days, Nova, One Day at a Time, and The More You Know.

Critical reception for the episode was favorable; certain critics believed the episode was not an "instant classic" in contrast to the other episodes of the season, but called it "memorable" and "brilliant" nevertheless, while others regarded it as the black sheep of the season. The episode caused controversy in Canada for the episode's final gag, in which Peter states that "Canada sucks." Ricky Blitt, the episode's writer, is himself Canadian.

== Plot ==
Chris hates being in the Youth Scouts and wants to quit, but is afraid to tell his father Peter. Chris is finally kicked out when he runs over the troop leader during a Soap Box Derby. Peter insists on driving Chris and the rest of the family (Peter's wife Lois, their daughter Meg and their infant Stewie) to the Youth Scout headquarters in Manhattan, to get Chris readmitted. While they are gone, their talking dog Brian is watching Nova just as the show is interrupted to show several episodes of the sitcom One Day at a Time. He tries to change the channel, but is unable to do so (nor can he turn the TV off), losing his intelligence shortly after watching a few episodes.

The family stops at a Native American casino as Peter needs to use the bathroom, Lois quickly becomes addicted to gambling, and loses the family car. Peter tries to get the car back by claiming to be Native American. The doubtful Indian elders demand that he go on a vision quest to prove his heritage. Chris accompanies Peter into the wilderness, hoping to tell him that he only wants to draw instead of being in the Scouts. Delirious from hunger, Peter begins talking to anthropomorphic trees and sees a vision of his spiritual guide, Fonzie. After hearing Fonzie's advice, Peter finally listens to Chris's complaints and realizes his son is a talented artist.

Peter and Chris return to the casino and reclaim the car. The episode ends with Lois, Stewie, and Meg counteracting stereotypes about Native Americans, Mexicans, and Swedes, respectively, before Peter comments that "Canada sucks."

== Production ==
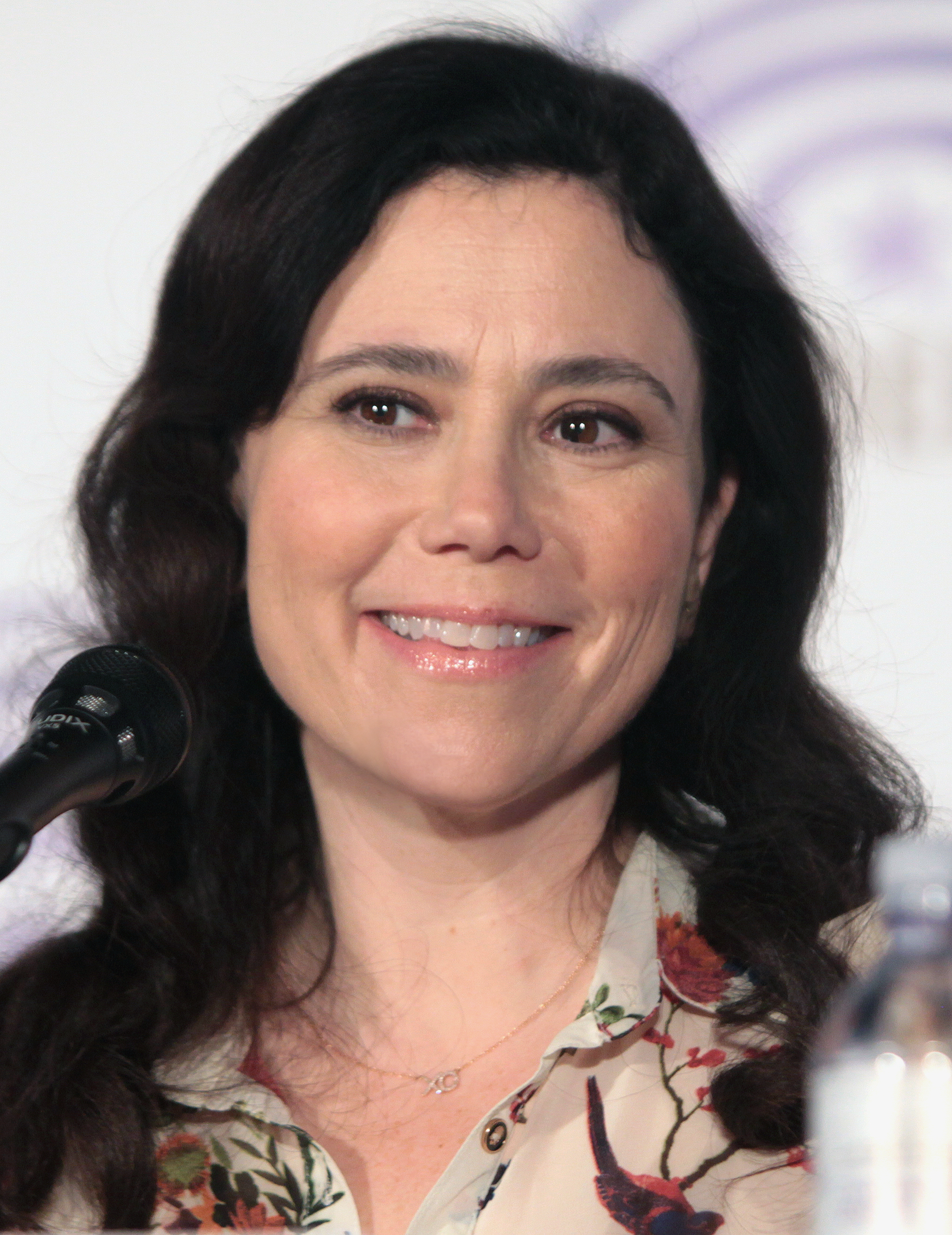
Alex Borstein helped in the writing of the episode.

"The Son Also Draws" was written by Ricky Blitt, his first episode in the Family Guy series, and directed by former Simpsons director Neil Affleck, also in his first Family Guy episode. Peter Shin and Roy Allen Smith, who have since supervised other episodes of Family Guy, both acted as supervising directors on this episode. Alex Borstein, the voice of Lois, helped write this episode, making her the first female member in the Family Guy writing staff; show creator Seth MacFarlane mentioned that her input on the character of Lois was particularly helpful. Andrew Gormley and voice actor Mike Henry acted as staff writers for this episode, while Ricky Blitt, Neil Goldman and Chris Sheridan worked as the story editors. The subplot of "The Son Also Draws" that involved Lois losing the car was based on the 1985 comedy film Lost in America. The part where Peter pretends to be an Indian to get the family car back was inspired by real-life instances of people who were "1/64th" Native American receiving money from wealthy casino tribes.

In addition to the regular cast, "The Son Also Draws" featured the voices of actors Suzie Plakson, Kevin Michael Richardson, Fred Tatasciore and Wally Wingert. Recurring guest voice actors included writer and animator Butch Hartman and actor Patrick Bristow.

== Cultural references ==
The television show the family is watching near the beginning of the show is an episode from the 1974 ABC sitcom Happy Days.

When the rest of the family is gone on the trip to Manhattan, Brian watches an episode of Nova, which is interrupted by a PBS announcement that they will be showing various episodes of One Day at a Time.

Speed and Pops from Speed Racer make an appearance at the Soap Box Derby starting line and again when the Griffins prepare to leave for Manhattan.

When Peter has to search for his spiritual guide, it turns out to be Fonzie from Happy Days.

The song sung by trees is "Cat's in the Cradle" by Harry Chapin.

The end of the episode features a parody of the series of public service announcements The More You Know.

== Reception ==
Reviews for "The Son Also Draws" were mixed to favorable. In a 2008 review, Ahsan Haque of IGN rated the episode an 8/10, stating that while the episode is not an "instant classic", it is "still quite strong" and has "more than a few clever moments". He also notes that the cutaways are "kept to a minimum", and much of the humor comes from the storyline. He commented that the episode did not have as many laugh-out-loud moments as other episodes, but stated that it had bolder humor than the show would later be known for. In his review of the first volume DVD collection of Family Guy, Aaron Beierle of DVD Talk listed "The Son Also Draws" as one of the series' "most brilliant moments", praising the spiritual vision sequence and naming the conversation between Peter and Brian among the best moments of the series, calling the conversation "rolling-on-the-floor funny."

Robin Pierson of The TV Critic, however, was far more hostile towards the episode, giving it the lowest rating of the season, a 44 out of 100. Pierson believed the episode was "very poor" and called the storyline "lame" and "unfocussed [sic]," with "a bunch of jokes to match." The gag at the end of the episode, in which Peter states that "Canada sucks", inspired anger from Canadian viewers of the show, which led them to send letters to the show's producers. Ricky Blitt, the writer of the episode and the person responsible for the controversial gag, is Canadian.

== Home media ==
"The Son Also Draws" and the complete first and second seasons of the series were released under the title Family Guy Volume One; this standard four-disc DVD box set debuted in Region 1 on April 15, 2003, three months before the premiere of the third season. Distributed by 20th Century Fox Television, it included several DVD extras such as episode commentaries, behind-the-scenes footage, and online promo spots. The same episodes, without the special features, were released in Region 2 on November 12, 2001 and in Region 4 on October 20, 2003.
