= Chitty Chitty Death Bang =

- Family Guy episode
- Episode no.: Season 1 Episode 3
- Directed by: Dominic Polcino
- Written by: Danny Smith
- Production code: 1ACX04
- Original air date: April 18, 1999

Guest appearances
- Lori Alan as Diane Simmons; Patrick Bristow as Cheesie Charlie's Manager; Butch Hartman as various characters; Mike Henry as Bruce the Performance Artist; Gary Janetti as various characters; Waylon Jennings as himself; Rachael MacFarlane as Jennifer; John O'Hurley as Cult Leader

Episode chronology
← Previous "I Never Met the Dead Man"	Next → "Mind Over Murder"
- Family Guy season 1

"Chitty Chitty Death Bang" is the third episode of the first season of the animated comedy series Family Guy. It was originally shown on Fox in the United States on April 18, 1999. The episode follows Peter after he tries to make amends for his son, Stewie's, first birthday party when he loses their reservation at a popular kids' restaurant known as Cheesie Charlie's. Meanwhile, Meg becomes friends with an excitable girl named Jennifer, who leads her to join a death cult (inspired by the 1997 Heaven's Gate mass suicide) in an attempt to fit in.

The episode was written by Danny Smith and directed by Dominic Polcino, both firsts in the Family Guy series. The episode featured guest performances by Butch Hartman, Waylon Jennings, Rachael MacFarlane and John O'Hurley, along with several recurring voice actors for the series. Much of the episode features a cutaway style of humor that is typically used in Family Guy, many of which feature cultural references including the Incredible Hulk, The Dukes of Hazzard, Three Little Pigs, and Couplehood.

The title "Chitty Chitty Death Bang" is a variation on that of the 1968 musical film Chitty Chitty Bang Bang.

== Plot ==
Lois books Cheesie Charlie's for Stewie's upcoming first birthday party and sends Peter, along with Chris, to drop off the deposit check at the restaurant. However, once they arrive, they decide to play the arcade machines, causing Peter to lose his watch in a claw machine. A young boy wins the watch, which annoys Peter, who attempts to forcibly take it back. Five minutes later, the manager notices the incident and asks Peter to leave. When Peter produces the deposit check, however, the manager immediately apologizes and enthusiastically states how excited they are to host Stewie's birthday party. Angered by the change in treatment, Peter declares that they will no longer be celebrating Stewie's party there. This prompts a crowd of customers to surround the manager, shouting for the reservation. Realizing what he has done, Peter rushes home and fabricates a poorly constructed lie to avoid Lois's anger, claiming that Cheesie Charlie's is run by Nazis who torture, kill, and kidnap people. He further claims that he has already planned an extravagant party at home so that Lois does not have to do any work.

Meanwhile, Stewie misunderstands the meaning of his birthday and believes that the mysterious "Man in White" who delivered him as an infant will return to force him back into Lois's womb, from which he escaped one year earlier. Meg cries on the way home from cheerleading practice with Peter, revealing that she has been struggling to fit in at school. Later, she meets a new friend named Jennifer. Meanwhile, Stewie makes his way to the airport in search of tickets but is stopped by a staff member, who offers him advice, explaining that running away from one's problems never solves anything. Stewie reflects on this and decides to face the "Man in White", wishing the man good luck before freezing him in carbonite.

Peter desperately but unsuccessfully attempts to assemble a birthday party in time for Stewie's celebration. He ultimately reroutes a circus into the Griffins' backyard, saving the party—until he reveals to Lois that he allowed Meg to attend a party at her friend's house. Lois, who wanted the entire family present, becomes upset with Peter for letting Meg go. Unbeknownst to them, Meg's "party" is actually a cult meeting in which the members plan to commit group suicide.

Peter goes to retrieve Meg and asks her to come home, explaining that Lois wants her there. Meg dismisses the request, saying it is only a birthday party and questioning whether anyone would notice if she were absent. Peter replies that Lois would, noting that she remembers everything and that her happiest memories are of when Meg and her brothers were born. He then realizes that having the entire family present is more important to Lois than to Stewie. Acknowledging how poorly she has been acting, Meg agrees to return home, and the cult members follow along. Peter gives a toast, then checks his watch before drinking the poisoned punch and pulls Meg away before she can drink hers, unknowingly saving her life as the cult members die. The cult leader, wearing a ceremonial white robe, pursues them and is mistaken by Stewie for the "Man in White". Stewie corners him in the Griffin household and vaporizes him with a laser rifle. Feeling victorious, Stewie joins the family to enjoy his party.

== Production ==
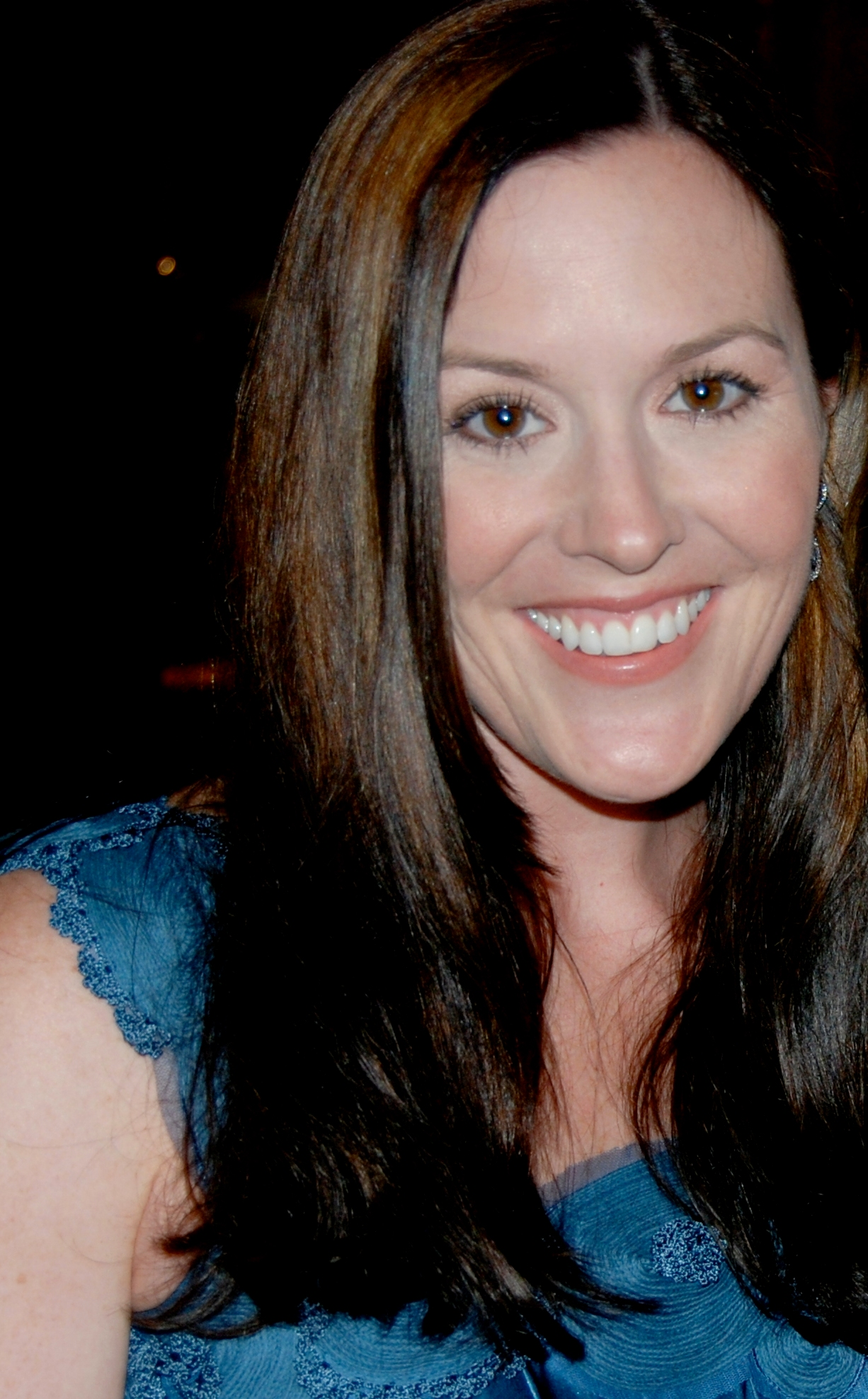
This was the first episode to include show creator Seth MacFarlane's sister Rachael as a guest voice actress.

"Chitty Chitty Death Bang" was written by Danny Smith and directed by Dominic Polcino, both their first episodes in the Family Guy series. Staff writers included voice actor Mike Henry and Andrew Gormley, while Ricky Blitt, Chris Sheridan as executive story editors, and Neil Goldman and Garrett Donovan acted as the story editors. To help Polcino direct the episode were supervising directors Peter Shin and Roy Allen Smith.

In addition to the regular cast, guest stars included actor and comedian Patrick Bristow, animator, executive producer, animation director, storyboard artist and producer Butch Hartman (who played Mr. Weed, Peter's boss, and various other characters), writer Gary Janetti (who played the Demon and Riff), actor John O'Hurley (who played the Cult Leader), and Waylon Jennings (who played himself). Recurring cast members included Mike Henry who played Cleveland Brown and Lori Alan who played Dianne Simons. This is the first episode Seth MacFarlane's sister, Rachael MacFarlane guest starred in the episode as the voice of Jennifer. In future episodes, she would become a recurring voice actor for the series. Rachel has noted that she was asked by Seth to lend her voice for the show, but she did have to audition for the role.

As with the remaining first four episodes of the season, the title of the episode, "Chitty Chitty Death Bang", was derived from 1930s and 1940s radio programs, particularly the radio thriller anthology "Suspense", which featured several elements pertaining to death and murder. This convention was later dropped following the fifth episode of the season, "A Hero Sits Next Door". due to individual episodes becoming difficult to identify and distinguish.

== Cultural references ==
When Peter explains to Lois why he canceled the party at Cheesie Charlie's, he said he had been kidnapped by them and that they are Nazis. He explains to Lois that he escaped by turning into the Incredible Hulk.

The place where Lois had planned Stewie's birthday party is called Cheesie Charlie's, which is a reference to the food chain Chuck E. Cheese's.

When Stewie recalls how he was conceived, he tells the story of which he was in a sperm ship and gets into a fight with other sperm ships is a reference to fights in the Star Wars trilogy.

Peter loses his Dukes of Hazzard watch.

When Peter is looking for pigs for a petting zoo he takes down a house of straw and a house made of sticks, this is a reference to the fairy tale Three Little Pigs.

Peter is also struck in the head by a paint can on a string, a reference to the film Home Alone.

Items added to the suicide cult punch mix by Jennifer include cyanide, arsenic, rat poison, and the book Couplehood by Paul Reiser.

The episode title is a reference to the 1968 musical film Chitty Chitty Bang Bang.

== Reception ==
A 2008 review of the episode written by Ahsan Haque of IGN was generally positive; Haque stated that while he did not believe "Chitty Chitty Death Bang" was an "instant classic", it has "plenty of memorable moments" and "a nicely crafted storyline". Haque went on to praise Peter's attempt to "convince [Lois] that the people at Cheesie Charlie's are Nazi devils who kidnapped him and that he only manages to escape because he was able to turn into the Incredible Hulk", as well as Stewie's role in the episode, calling it "extremely clever". Haque concluded his review by rating the episode an 8.4/10. David Williams from the DVD Movie Guide said that this and other episodes of the first season did a marvelous job of introducing the characters of the series to the viewers.

In his review of "Chitty Chitty Death Bang" the TV Critic called the writing in the episode wittier than in previous ones. He found the Stewie storyline very enjoyable, and also commented positively on the moral of the story. He criticized the Meg storyline as he did not find mass suicide funny; he also commented that Peter felt a lot like Homer from The Simpsons. In his final comments he said it had some odd moments but it was a fun story.
