= Griffin family =

Fictional family in the Family Guy series

The Griffins (Family Guy)
- Family Guy family
- The Griffin family. From left to right: Chris, Peter, Stewie, Lois, Brian, and Meg.
- First appearance: "Death Has a Shadow" (1999)
- Created by: Seth MacFarlane
- Duration: 1999–present

The Griffin family is a fictional family and main characters in the animated television series Family Guy, and who also appear in The Cleveland Show. The Griffins are a dysfunctional family consisting of the married couple Peter and Lois, their three children Meg, Chris, and Stewie, and their anthropomorphic dog Brian. They live at 31 Spooner Street in the fictional town of Quahog, Rhode Island. Their family car resembles a red seventh-generation Ford Country Sedan. They were created by Seth MacFarlane, in model of his two animated films, The Life of Larry and Larry & Steve. The family and the show itself debuted on January 31, 1999, after Super Bowl XXXIII, in the episode "Death Has a Shadow".

Alongside the six main family members, there are a number of other major and minor characters in their family. The most common recurring characters are Lois's parents Carter and Barbara Pewterschmidt, and Peter's now-deceased parents Francis and Thelma Griffin, except for his biological father named Mickey McFinnigan. Other recurring family members include Lois's two siblings, Carol and Patrick, as well as Brian's cousin Jasper. Peter and Lois also have two late children: Peter Griffin Jr., who died due to Peter shaking him too much, and Dave Griffin, the twin of Stewie whom Stewie killed in Lois' womb. Peter also has several more children, such as Bertram, due to his sperm donation.

== Creation ==
MacFarlane conceived the idea for Family Guy in 1998, developing it out of his two short films. MacFarlane caught the attention of Fox, and was given $50,000 to make a pilot episode. MacFarlane completed the 11-minute pilot after six months of hand animation. Upon review, Fox gave the green light to Family Guy as a series. Although Family Guy's cancellation was initially announced after the second season, Fox decided to make a third season, after which it was cancelled in 2002. However, reruns on Adult Swim drove up interest in the show, and its DVD releases did quite well, selling over 2.2 million copies in one year, which renewed network interest.

Family Guy returned to production in 2004, making four more seasons (for a total of seven) and a straight-to-DVD special, Stewie Griffin: The Untold Story. The show celebrated its official 100th episode during its sixth season in November 2007, resulting in the show's syndication. The show is contracted to continue producing episodes.

== Casting ==
Seth MacFarlane voices three of the show's main characters, Peter Griffin, Brian Griffin and Stewie Griffin. He has stated that he already knew what kind of voice he was looking for the main characters so it was easier to do it himself. Peter's voice is inspired by the voice of a security guard MacFarlane overheard talking while attending the Rhode Island School of Design. Stewie's voice was based on the voice of English actor Rex Harrison, particularly based on Harrison's performance in the 1964 musical drama film My Fair Lady. Brian's voice is MacFarlane's regular speaking voice. In addition MacFarlane provides the voice of various recurring and one-time characters, most prominently those of the Griffins' neighbor Glenn Quagmire, news anchor Tom Tucker and Lois' father Carter Pewterschmidt. Alex Borstein voices Lois Griffin, television correspondent Tricia Takanawa, Loretta Brown and Lois' mother Barbara Pewterschmidt. Borstein was asked to provide a voice for the pilot while she was working on Mad TV. She had not met MacFarlane or seen any artwork and said it was "really sight unseen". At the time, she was doing a stage show in Los Angeles, in which she played a redhead mother, whose voice she had based on one of her cousins. The voice was originally slower, when MacFarlane heard it, he replied "Make it a little less ... annoying ... and speed it up, or every episode will last four hours".

Seth Green primarily plays Chris Griffin and Jewish pharmacist Mort Goldman's nerdy son Neil Goldman. Green admittedly did an impression of the Buffalo Bill character from the thriller film The Silence of the Lambs during his audition. His main inspiration for Chris' voice was how "Buffalo Bill" would sound if he worked at a drive-thru in a McDonald's (speaking through a PA system). Mila Kunis and Lacey Chabert have both played the voices of Meg Griffin. Lacey Chabert voiced Meg Griffin for the first production season (15 episodes). However, because of a contractual agreement, she was never credited. Chabert left the series due to time constraints with her acting role in Party of Five, as well as schoolwork, while Kunis won the role after auditions, a slight rewrite of the character and because of her performance on That '70s Show. MacFarlane called Kunis back after her initial audition asking her to speak slower; she was called back again later, this time instructed to enunciate more. Kunis said that she had it under control, and MacFarlane hired her. In an interview with a Sun Media correspondent in 2007, Kunis was asked about her character and said: "She's the scapegoat". "Meg gets picked on a lot. But it's funny. It's like the middle child. She is constantly in the state of being an awkward 14-year-old, when you're kind of going through puberty and what-not. She's just in perpetual mode of humiliation. And it's fun."

== Main family ==
The show revolves around the adventures and activities of the family of Peter Griffin, a bumbling, but well-intentioned, blue-collar worker. Peter is an Irish-American Catholic born in Mexico with a prominent Rhode Island and Eastern Massachusetts accent. His wife Lois is a stay-at-home mother and piano teacher, and has a distinct New England accent from being a member of the Pewterschmidt family of wealthy socialites. Peter and Lois have three children: Meg, their teenage daughter, who is frequently the butt of Peter's jokes due to her "homeliness" and lack of popularity; Chris, their teenage son, who in many respects, appears as a younger version of his father; and Stewie, their diabolical infant son of ambiguous sexual orientation who has adult mannerisms and speaks fluently with an upper-class affected English accent and stereotypical archvillain phrases. Living with the family is Brian, the family dog, who is highly anthropomorphized, drinks martinis, occasionally smokes cigarettes, drives a car, and engages in human conversation, though he occasionally acts like a normal dog; for example, he cannot resist chasing a ball.

=== Peter Griffin ===
Peter Löwenbräu Griffin, voiced by Seth MacFarlane. Peter is the father and patriarch of the Griffin family (hence the show's "family guy") and is a stereotypical blue-collar worker. Leader of the Griffin family, he is Irish-American Catholic. Peter is also an obese and bespectacled man who is just a big child. He has other roots beside his Irish ones, including African American, Spanish, Scottish and German. In an interview with The Advocate, MacFarlane described him as "Archie Bunker without the knowledge of what he's doing. He has the mind of a child, basically, and a source of big laughs is when he does not realize he's doing something inappropriate." In the season four episode "Petarded", Peter takes an IQ test, and discovers that his low intellect places him in a category slightly below intellectually disabled, but higher than a creationist. He is incredibly jealous of other attractions Lois has in her life, an attitude that tends to get out of hand in most cases, even assaulting a whale that kissed Lois at SeaWorld. In the season three episode "Stuck Together, Torn Apart", Peter and Lois split up because of Peter's jealousy only to discover that Lois has the same character flaw and the two decide to live with their mutually jealous nature. Peter has a very short attention span and frequently ends up in bizarre situations, as Chris points out in "Long John Peter", after Peter's parrot dies "He will get over it pretty quickly and then move on to another wacky thing", to which Peter finds a pipe organ and forgets about his parrot.

=== Lois Griffin ===
Lois Patrice Griffin (née Pewterschmidt), voiced by Alex Borstein. Lois is the mother and matriarch of the Griffin family. Lois' morals are often questionable, as she went through a brief period of kleptomania in the episode "Breaking Out Is Hard to Do", for which she went to prison. She also showed a gambling addiction when the family went to an Indian casino in "The Son Also Draws" during the first season. Various episodes have hinted that Lois is an avid drug user, but this is shown most clearly in "Deep Throats", where she revealed that she smoked marijuana when she was pregnant with Stewie, a claim backed-up by series creator Seth MacFarlane on a DVD commentary. Also, when asked by Peter where she got a tattoo on her lower back, she replied, "Oh, I don't know Peter, meth is a hell of a drug" ("Prick Up Your Ears"). When Meg is thought to have become pregnant, Lois tells her to "smoke and drink a lot" (when Meg does not want to have an abortion, which Lois hinted at beforehand) "but don't start, then chicken out halfway throughout the pregnancy, 'cause then you'll wind up with Chris", which suggests she smoked and consumed alcohol while pregnant with Chris.

=== Meg Griffin ===
Megan (Note: In the episode "A Fistful of Meg", it is revealed that Peter Griffin put the name "Megatron" on her birth certificate, though Lois Griffin had already chosen the name Megan, by which she is still commonly known.) "Meg" Griffin, voiced by Mila Kunis. Meg is a self-conscious and emotionally vulnerable teenage girl. She is currently 18 years old and enrolled at James Woods Regional High School. Her numerous insecurities cause her to desperately try to be part of the "in-crowd", but this only results in her getting rebuffed by Connie D'Amico, the bullying head cheerleader of her school. Initially valued to the family in earlier seasons, her standing in the family's "pecking order" is now much more similar to that of the stereotypical "middle child" (despite being the oldest of the Griffin children by age) such as being the butt of Peter's jokes due to her "homeliness" and lack of self-confidence, despite frequently proving to be more responsible and reasonable than the rest of the family, although there is one episode where she is sent to prison. Despite all this, Meg has proven in various episodes throughout the show that she is surprisingly more talented, most notably in terms of music and even sports, than her family usually bothers to realize. However, another student named Neil Goldman has a crush on her. At times, she has been shown to be so self-conscious that she has engaged in dangerous sexual behavior just for attention.

=== Chris Griffin ===
Christopher Cross "Chris" Griffin, voiced by Seth Green. Chris is a friendly and laid-back teenage boy. Physically, he is a younger version of Peter, but intellectually, he often shows better potential, as shown from moments of articulation and coherence within his speech, and makes good points when especially talking about films, TV series, actors and actresses, etc. Similar to Meg, Chris deals with the problems that most teenage boys face: acne, girls, and school. He is currently 15 years old and, like Meg, is enrolled at James Woods Regional High School. On the volume 1 DVD box set, it's stated that Chris "would not hurt a fly, unless it landed on his hot dog". Chris is also willing to take drastic measures to get what he wants or needs, especially when it comes to getting good grades. He, at one point, believed that he got a bad grade on a mathematics test when he tickled his brain by sticking an army man's rifle into his nose and accidentally puncturing a lobe.

=== Stewie Griffin ===
Stewart Gilligan "Stewie" Griffin, voiced by Seth MacFarlane. Stewie is the youngest Griffin family member as a one-year-old. Stewie originally served as the main villain of the show. Though he was originally an antagonistic child-genius sociopath, hell-bent on killing his mother and taking over the world, in more recent episodes he is a much more friendly yet flamboyant (and possibly homosexual) character, though nonetheless still rambunctious and disrespecting towards his elders and peers. Despite having a rivalry with the family dog, Brian, this seems to have ended as he and Brian now share a very close friendship, and they admitted that they loved each other, in the episode "Brian & Stewie". Stewie is considered to be the show's breakout character. Wizard magazine rated him the 95th-greatest villain of all time.

=== Brian Griffin ===
Brian Griffin, voiced by Seth MacFarlane, is the Griffin family's pet dog. Brian has lived with the Griffin family since Peter picked him up as a stray. He is the best friend of both Peter and Stewie, despite Brian's superior intelligence over the former. Brian is often the voice of reason for the family, frequently reminding Peter how stupid or corrupt his ideas are. His close friendship with Stewie is often a focal point, and the two of them have been at the center of some of the most critically acclaimed episodes during the series, most notably the "Road to ..." episodes. Seth MacFarlane has once described Brian as "a dog who has a wit as dry as the martinis he drinks". MacFarlane also revealed that Brian is his favorite character from the series, as he feels most comfortable when playing that role.
