= Chris Griffin =

Fictional character from the Family Guy franchise

- Family Guy character
- First appearance: "Death Has a Shadow" (1999)
- Created by: Seth MacFarlane
- Designed by: Seth MacFarlane
- Voiced by: Seth MacFarlane (1998; original pilot); Seth Green (1999–present)

In-universe information
- Full name: Christopher Cross Griffin
- Gender: Male
- Occupation: 10th grader at Adam West High School; Former paperboy; Former Supervisor of Quahog Mini-Mart; Middle school student (seasons 1-4)
- Family: Peter Griffin (father); Lois Griffin (mother); Meg Griffin (sister); Stewie Griffin (brother); Brian Griffin (dog)
- Relatives: Carter Pewterschmidt (maternal grandfather); Barbara Pewterschmidt (maternal grandmother); Thelma Griffin (paternal grandmother); Francis Griffin (adoptive paternal grandfather); Mickey McFinnigan (biological paternal grandfather); Patrick Pewterschmidt (maternal uncle); Carol Pewterschmidt (maternal aunt); Chip Griffin (paternal uncle); Karen Griffin (paternal aunt); Bertram (half brother); Boston Stewie (half brother)
- Home: Quahog, Rhode Island
- Nationality: American
- Age: 16

Christopher Cross "Chris" Griffin is a fictional character from the animated television series Family Guy. He is the second of three children of Peter and Lois Griffin and is the older brother of Stewie Griffin and the younger brother of Meg Griffin. He is voiced by the American actor, producer, and writer Seth Green and first appeared on television, along with the rest of the Griffin family, in the episode "Death Has a Shadow" on January 31, 1999.

Chris Griffin was created and designed by the series' creator, Seth MacFarlane, who was asked to pitch a pilot to the Fox Broadcasting Company. The series' pilot episode was based on The Life of Larry and Larry & Steve, two shorts made by MacFarlane which featured a middle-aged man named Larry and an intellectual dog, Steve. Chris was based on Milt, the teenage son character in The Life of Larry. Chris is an overweight adult boy with long, shaggy blond hair and medium skin. He wears a blue t-shirt, black sweatpants, white sneakers with red stripes, and an orange baseball cap with black on the back. His face looks similar to his father's, having the same kind of eyes, nose and chin. In the first three seasons, he wore golden hoop earrings.

Originally designed as a somewhat gregarious, yet unintelligent teenager, Chris has become more awkward and idiotic over the course of the show. Running gags in the series involving Chris include the existence of an 'Evil Monkey' in his closet (though it is later revealed that the monkey is not evil), his frequent masturbation, and his perverted admirer, the elderly Herbert who lusts after and repeatedly tries to prey on him throughout the show's run.

== Character origins ==
The character of Chris Griffin resembles that of Milt's, the son of the main character Larry Cummings in The Life of Larry. The animated short film was created by Seth MacFarlane at the Rhode Island School of Design in 1995 which later led to the development of Family Guy, which aired three years later.

Seth Green has stated that his main inspiration for Chris' voice came from envisioning how the Buffalo Bill character from the thriller film The Silence of the Lambs would sound if he were speaking through a PA system at a McDonald's restaurant.

== Personality ==
Similar to his older sister Meg, Chris is portrayed as a typical adolescent, albeit one who comes off as being good-natured and easy-going. As such, the character tends to take things in his stride, not worrying about much, seemingly enjoying his position in life. On the Volume 1 DVD box set Family Guy edition, it is stated that Chris "wouldn't hurt a fly, unless it landed on his hot dog".

Chris is seemingly willing to take drastic measures to meet his academic needs, especially to address his below-average grades. In one episode, he thinks he got a bad grade on his geometry test when he tickled his brain with a plastic army man's rifle inserted into his nose, accidentally puncturing a lobe.

Despite frequently displaying Peter's characteristic stupidity, Chris is usually portrayed as a faster learner than Peter, and has a variety of talents, such as filmmaking, video editing, etc. In "Patriot Games", when the family moves to London, Chris is the only member of the family who learns how to speak cockney English in a matter of seconds. Conversely, however, when his brother Stewie tries to help him prepare for a history exam in "Stewie, Chris, & Brian's Excellent Adventure", he seems to show great difficulty in grasping new ideas. Chris and Stewie are often shown to share a strong bond: with Stewie claiming the two are a team who look out for one another like "Owl and Costello". On Season: 23, Episode: 14, Chris was confirmed to have Autism. Chris stated in this episode that he was "on the spectrum."

He also shares his father's cartoonish lack of common sense, tends to be absent-minded, gets confused easily, and appears to be extremely naïve; in "Lethal Weapons", when Peter and Lois are having a fist fight, Chris cheers for the former, telling him to "kick her ass!". Earlier in the episode, after Chris breaks a vase with his basketball and Lois tells Peter to punish him with a spanking, Peter tells him to "punish [himself]" and subsequently spanks himself. In Stewie Griffin: The Untold Story, when the children watch Lois and Peter trying to have sex, Chris mistakes it for a fight and says, "Meg, why do you think they're fighting?", but Meg angrily whispers to him "They're not." In the episode "Trading Places", after Chris accidentally damages Peter's dirt bike, Peter "punishes" him by making him start smoking.

Although Meg is often humiliated or embarrassed by his actions like she is with Peter's actions, Chris usually loves and cares for her deeply, and the two are frequently shown to get along very well. Up until sometime during the sixth season, Chris is more socially active at school than Meg, having various friends, including several girls, while attending Buddy Cianci Junior High School, and later at James Woods Regional High School (now called Adam West High School).

As the series progresses and Meg is seen more often with her group of friends, Chris's social status is greatly reduced to the point of being unpopular and virtually friendless at James Woods Regional High School. While just as socially looked down upon as Meg (though to a lesser extent of being bullied), he is outwardly confident and spirited, mostly when dealing with the ups and downs of being a teenager, such as running for Homecoming King, standing up to bullies, lashing out against his date, and frequently acting out against Peter's hurtful ways.

In "Stew-Roids", Chris's popularity increases drastically when the school's queen bee, Connie D'Amico, dates him. At first, she does this to be more popular since "dating a loser" improves her self confidence, however she begins to develop feelings towards Chris when he confesses his feelings towards her. Later in the episode, however, Chris's popularity turns him mean and shallow, and he dumps Connie after making out with two other girls at a house party. Connie and Meg then briefly team up to humiliate Chris by having Neil Goldman show the school a video of him re-enacting a scene from The Silence of the Lambs in which Buffalo Bill dances nude in front of a mirror, which results in Connie regaining her popularity, while Chris is socially demoted back to being an outcast.

In "Once Bitten", Chris befriends Neil Goldman, the Jewish resident "nerd/geek" and Meg's self-proclaimed love interest. Although their friendship was initially a ploy for Neil to get closer to Meg, Neil feels bad for using Chris and returns to him to resume their friendship.

== Evil Monkey ==
As a running gag, starting in the episode "Dammit Janet!", Chris is regularly tormented by the Evil Monkey, who lives in his closet, though whenever he complains about it to anyone, they often laugh along with him instead thinking it is a joke, after which the monkey appears with a malevolent grimace and points at Chris in a threatening and intimidating manner. In "Hannah Banana", Chris proves the monkey's existence to the family, though ends up becoming friends with him after the monkey (who appears not to be evil at all, but just a poor creature who was depressed after his ex-wife cheated on him with another monkey) helps him write out a book report and subsequently pass.

The simian explains his frightening mannerisms as a result of various conditions and unintended actions. Chris introduces him to his friends, they hang out with each other in "fun" places, and the monkey helps Chris in his studies in school, which Peter does not do. This, however, causes a rift between Chris and Peter when the former realizes that the monkey cares more for him than his father. Eventually, the Evil Monkey helps the two characters to patch things up, especially after Peter saves the monkey from Miley Cyrus (who is depicted as an android) who had kidnapped him the live action King Kong. After that, the monkey happily moves out of Chris' closet to live in the closet of Tom Tucker's son, Jake, where the cycle will start in anew, as Jake himself experiences difficulty with his father.

In a 2003 interview, Seth MacFarlane stated that the writers thought it would be funny to give Chris a childhood fear that is actually real, since he has "a childlike mind". The monkey's trademark grimace and pointing was the idea of writer Mike Barker.

== Identification with Seth Green ==
Another running gag, which began in the Star Wars remake episode "Blue Harvest", has Chris defend the overall career of voice actor Seth Green, along with the animated series Robot Chicken: an Adult Swim show Green co-created as an in-joke where Green and Seth MacFarlane are jokingly portrayed as 'bitter competitors' in the field of adult animation.

When Peter (MacFarlane) methodically denigrates Robot Chicken in "Blue Harvest", Chris loses his temper and storms off. This gag is continued in "Something, Something, Something, Dark Side": though Chris attempts to maintain a cool head, he storms off again when Peter offers to tell the story of Without a Paddle, a critically panned film that featured Green. Both these scenes happen in the framing device of the episode (in which the family recounts the events of the original Star Wars trilogy whilst they have lost power during a storm) and not in the interior Star Wars narrative, in which Green portrays Chris as Star Wars hero Luke Skywalker.

In the final Star Wars parody, "It's a Trap!", mocking Green's career provokes further dismay in Chris: who attempts to defend Green from Carter Pewterschmidt, who claims the actor "really gets under [his] skin" and has failed to be part of any successful project, by citing Buffy the Vampire Slayer and the Austin Powers film series as prominent examples of success in Green's career. Chris is rebuffed by Pewterschmidt: who argues that the popularity of Buffy was largely over-stated by coverage of the show by Entertainment Weekly and that moviegoers were largely uninterested in Green's involvement in the Austin Powers films.

Furthermore, after Chris refuses to fight Stewie, the latter claims to be unfazed, as Stewie could simply "get Seth Green to fight [him]", claiming Green will "do anything for money" citing Sex Drive: a critically and commercially unsuccessful film starring Green as an example of the actor's greed, and deriding the film due to its obscurity. These taunts give Chris (in character as Skywalker) the conviction to retaliate against Stewie/Darth Vader and Carter/Darth Sidious (both played by MacFarlane).

In the closing scenes of the episode's framing device, an irritated Chris asks his father Peter about his various derisions of Seth Green, to which Peter retorts that he simply finds Green to be a "douche". An agitated Chris thus discusses his opinion of Family Guy creator Seth MacFarlane's career suggesting the animated sitcom is a rip-off of The Simpsons; MacFarlane is then defended by the characters whom he voices (Peter, Brian and Stewie): who refer to MacFarlane as handsome and talented.

Outside of the Star Wars-themed episodes, "Road to the Multiverse" plays on the running gag, but with Stewie provoking the Robot Chicken universe counterpart of Chris by asking "How does it feel to be on a major network for thirty seconds?", which prompts Chris to scream "Fuck you!"

Chris and Green's birthdays are on the same day, February 8.
