= The Life of Larry and Larry & Steve =

Short films made by Seth MacFarlane

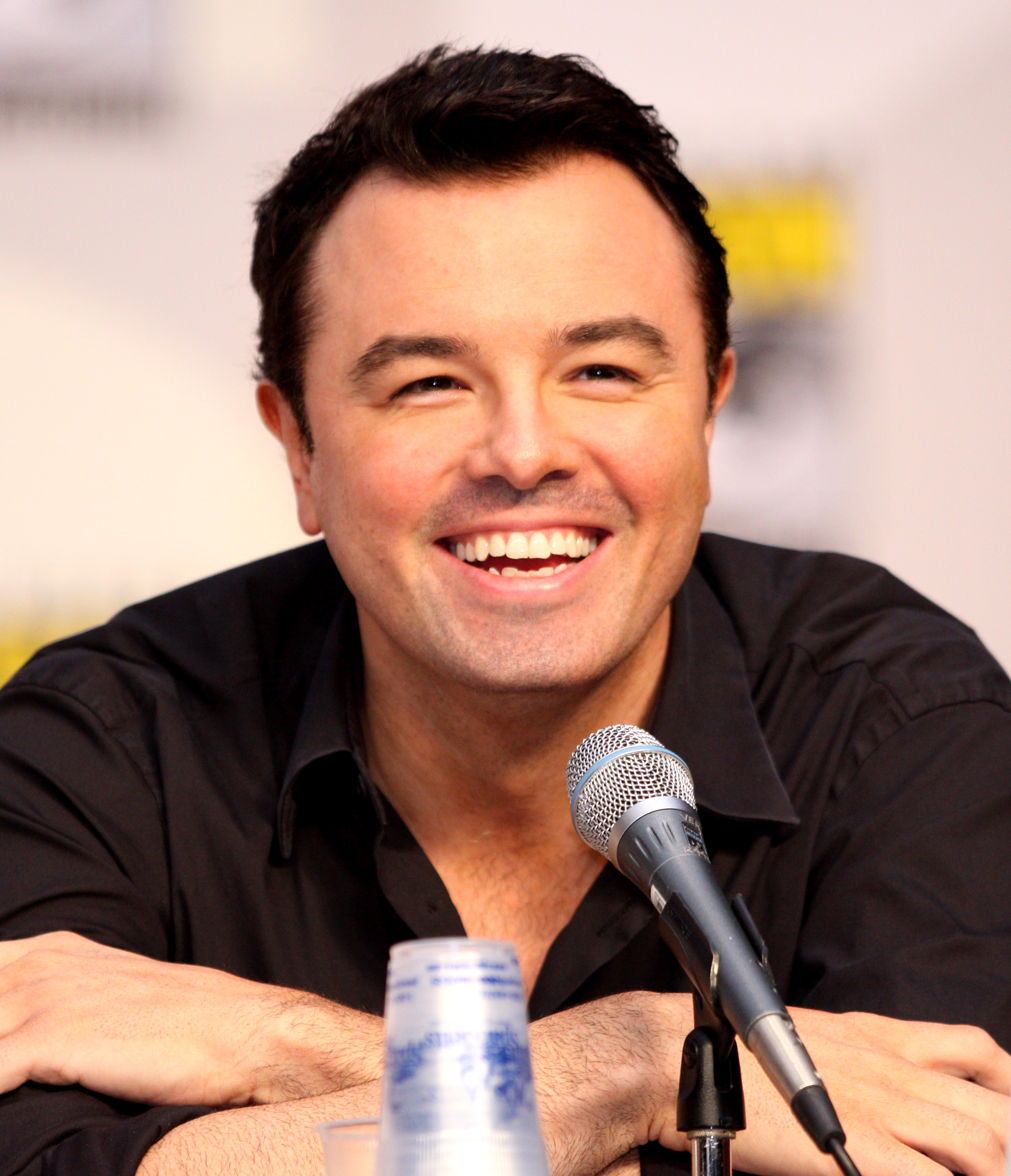
Seth MacFarlane, creator of The Life of Larry and Larry & Steve

The Life of Larry and Larry & Steve are two animated short films created by Seth MacFarlane in the mid-1990s, eventually leading to the development of the animated sitcom Family Guy. He originally created The Life of Larry as a thesis film in 1995 while attending the Rhode Island School of Design. His professor at RISD submitted MacFarlane's cartoon to Hanna-Barbera, where he was hired a year later.

Later that year, MacFarlane created a retool of The Life of Larry called Larry & Steve that features the main character of his first film, the dim-witted, middle-aged Larry, and an intellectual dog named Steve. MacFarlane was also hired as a writer for Disney's Jungle Cubs. The short was broadcast as one of Cartoon Network's What a Cartoon! in 1997. Executives at Fox saw both Larry shorts and contracted MacFarlane to create a series based on the characters, to be called Family Guy.

Peter Griffin, one of the main characters in Family Guy, is largely based on Larry, while Steve is the main inspiration behind the Griffin family dog, Brian. Fox proposed MacFarlane complete a 15-minute short, giving him a budget of $50,000. MacFarlane stated that the pilot for Family Guy took half a year to create and produce.

Recalling the experience in an interview with The New York Times, MacFarlane stated, "I spent about six months with no sleep and no life, just drawing like crazy in my kitchen and doing this pilot." Upon completion of the pilot, the series went on the air. The network executives were impressed with the pilot and ordered thirteen episodes, seven of which aired during the first season of Family Guy. MacFarlane was offered a $2-million-per-season contract.

== The Life of Larry (1995) ==
The Life of Larry
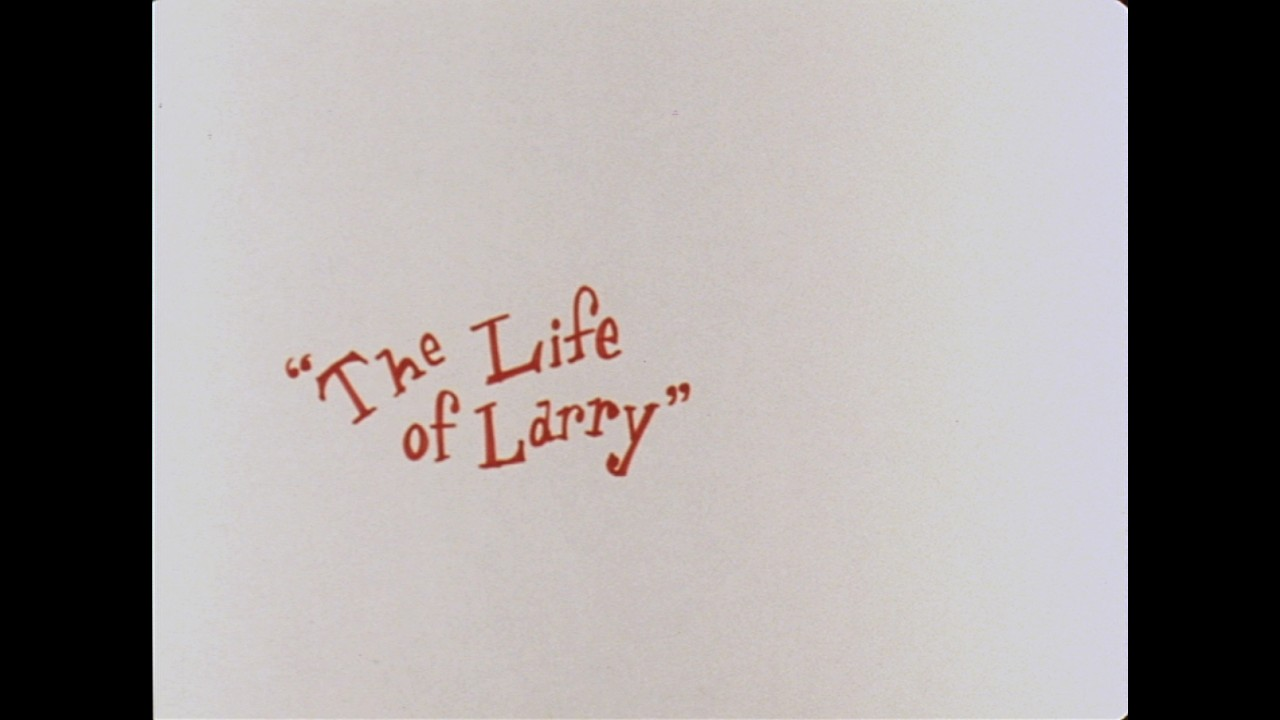
- Title card for The Life of Larry
- Directed by: Seth Woodbury MacFarlane
- Written by: Seth MacFarlane
- Produced by: Seth MacFarlane; Davis Doi (supervising)
- Starring: Seth MacFarlane; Chang S. Han
- Edited by: Seth MacFarlane
- Music by: Seth MacFarlane
- Production company: Rhode Island School of Design
- Distributed by: Rhode Island School of Design
- Release date: July 26, 1995
- Running time: 11 minutes
- Country: United States
- Language: English

The Life of Larry is a 1995 animated film directed by Seth MacFarlane, who also stars as the majority of the characters. It also features a brief appearance from American politician Newt Gingrich in a cutaway gag that employs audio of one of Gingrich's speeches. The short features a middle-aged everyman named Larry Cummings, his cynical talking dog, Steve, patient wife Lois, and overweight teenage son Milt.

The film also features live-action segments shot at MacFarlane's home in Kent, Connecticut, where he describes the film and its characters in the form of a pitch to a television network. During the live action segments, MacFarlane is being served cheesecake by his Asian servant, Wang, played by fellow student Chang S. Han.

The Life of Larry was created as MacFarlane's thesis film during 1994–1995, while he was studying at the Rhode Island School of Design. The animated film was created almost entirely by MacFarlane alone, with the exception being the live action sequence, which was filmed by classmates Sean Leahy and Greg Scalzo.

Many jokes and cutaway gags used in The Life of Larry were later used in the first season of Family Guy.

== Larry & Steve (1997) ==
The Life of Larry and Larry & Steve
- Title card
- Written by: Seth MacFarlane
- Directed by: Seth MacFarlane
- Starring: Seth MacFarlane; Lori Alan
- Music by: Ron Jones; Gary Lionelli (Theme); Bodie Chandler (director)
- Country of origin: United States
- Original language: English

Production
- Executive producers: Larry Huber; Sherry Gunther
- Running time: 7 minutes
- Production company: Cartoon Network Studios

Original release
- Network: Cartoon Network
- Release: February 5, 1997

Hanna-Barbera's head of development, Ellen Cockrill, saw The Life of Larry and met MacFarlane during a senior screening at RISD. Cockrill offered him a development position at What a Cartoon! to create a sequel of sorts to The Life of Larry, which Cartoon Network broadcast in 1997. He went on staff at the studio afterwards, developing a still-born revival of The Jetsons and becoming a staff writer on the Johnny Bravo series, partnered with writer/director Butch Hartman, under story editor Steve Marmel.

The plot of Larry & Steve is that Larry adopts Steve from the dog pound, after noticing that he was the only talking dog (although to everybody else throughout the cartoon, Steve is just barking, similar to Stewie in Family Guy), and the two have a drawn out, slapstick-filled misadventure trying to buy furniture and appliances for Larry's apartment.

There is also an airline pilot in this cartoon, whose voice and appearance is very similar to the Family Guy character Glenn Quagmire who is also a commercial airline pilot in Family Guy. Larry mentions a furniture store called "Stewie's", a name that will later be used for the character of Peter Griffin's infant son.

A man who resembles Peter's father (in reality his stepfather) Francis also appears in the short.

== Relationship with Family Guy ==
In basic form, The Life of Larry is very similar in format to Family Guy. Steve would be the main inspiration behind Brian. MacFarlane based Peter's voice, which was similar to Larry's, on the voice of a security guard he once overheard talking while he was attending the RISD. While Larry and Peter's wives share the same name, they do not resemble one another.

Larry's son Milt, by contrast, harbors a basic design similarity to Peter's son Chris. The pilot of the plane that crashes in the store in Larry & Steve has a chin and voice that are both similar to Quagmire's, who is also a pilot. Two characters from both films, Shelley Boothbishop and Larry, made their way into the Family Guy episodes, with Shelley appearing in "There's Something About Paulie", "North by North Quahog" and "Long John Peter". Larry also appeared in the episode "Happy Holo-ween" as one of the forms a malfunctioning Holo-Peter takes on upon his demise. Larry was also the name of one of Peter's sperm donors in the episode "A House Full of Peters".

== See also ==
- Family Guy
- What a Cartoon!
