= Peter Griffin =

Fictional character from Family Guy

- Family Guy character
- First appearance: "Death Has a Shadow" (1999)
- Created by: Seth MacFarlane
- Designed by: Seth MacFarlane
- Voiced by: Seth MacFarlane

In-universe information
- Full name: Peter Löwenbräu Griffin Sr. (Note: In the season 13 episode Quagmire's Mom, Peter's birth name is revealed to be Justin Peter Griffin. He reluctantly changes it to Peter when Lois suggests it. His birth name is never mentioned again.)
- Gender: Male
- Occupation: Brewery shipping clerk; Former safety inspector at the Happy-Go-Lucky toy factory; Former fisherman
- Family: Thelma Griffin (mother); Francis Griffin (adoptive father); Mickey McFinnigan (biological father); Karen Griffin (sister); Chip Griffin (twin brother)
- Spouse: Lois Griffin
- Children: Meg Griffin (daughter); Chris Griffin (son); Stewie Griffin (son); Bertram and dozens of other children from peter's sperm donations
- Home: Quahog, Rhode Island
- Nationality: Mexican (by birth); Irish (by father); American (by marriage) (Note: In the episode "Padre de Familia" (season 6, episode 6), Peter finds out that he was born in Mexico City and that his mother never legally granted him American citizenship. So, Peter tries to obtain citizenship through a naturalization test, but he fails. In the end, Peter obtains American citizenship by naturalization thanks to his marriage to Lois.)
- Age: 45

Peter Löwenbräu Griffin Sr. (Born Justin Peter Griffin) is a fictional character and the protagonist of the American animated sitcom Family Guy. He is voiced by series creator Seth MacFarlane, and first appeared on television, along with the rest of the Griffin family, in the episode "Death Has a Shadow" on January 31, 1999. Peter was created and designed by MacFarlane himself. MacFarlane was asked to pitch a pilot to the Fox Broadcasting Company based on Larry & Steve, a short made by MacFarlane which featured a middle-aged character named Larry and an intellectual dog, Steve. For the series, Larry was renamed Peter.

Peter is married to Lois and is the father of Meg, Chris, and Stewie. He also has a dog named Brian, with whom he is best friends. He has worked at a toy factory and at Quahog's Brewery. Peter's voice was inspired by the security guards that MacFarlane heard at his school. His appearance was a redesign of the protagonist Larry from MacFarlane's previous animated short films The Life of Larry and Larry & Steve. He has appeared in several pieces of Family Guy merchandise—including toys, T-shirts, and video games—and he has made crossover appearances in other shows, including The Simpsons, Drawn Together and South Park, in addition to fellow MacFarlane-associated series American Dad!, Bordertown and Family Guy spin-off The Cleveland Show.

As a character, Peter Griffin was initially praised by critics for his outrageous humor, absurd anecdotes, slapstick antics, and over-the-top, goofy yet endearing personality. Over time, however, his reception has become more mixed, with criticism for his increasingly crude, mean-spirited, and offensive behavior, as well as his similarities to Homer Simpson in both personality and comedic style.

== Role in Family Guy ==
Peter Griffin is a middle-class Mexican-born Irish American in his mid‑forties, who is a bespectacled, obese blue-collar worker with a prominent Rhode Island and Eastern Massachusetts accent. Peter's age has never been officially confirmed and has fluctuated throughout the series, although he is consistently referred to as being in his early-to-mid 40s. Peter and his wife, Lois, have three children: Meg, Chris, and Stewie. He also has three deceased children: (Note: Peter's children other than Meg, Chris and Stewie generally only appear in one-off jokes.) Peter Jr., who was shaken to death; Dave, Stewie's twin who is implied to have been killed by Stewie during childbirth; and Tmas, Chris's stillborn twin brother. He is the illegitimate son of Thelma Griffin and Mickey McFinnigan, and was raised by Thelma and his stepfather, Francis Griffin. It is uncertain whether Peter's legal parents were married before he was conceived, however, as Peter has a flashback in which Francis directly tells him "I'm not your father!" in the episode "Peter's Two Dads", in which Peter realizes that Francis is not his true father, implying he knew that Peter is not his biological son. On several occasions Peter has made reference to several ancestors who he notes to have been historically important figures, such as Moses Griffin, Angus Griffin (who Peter claimed invented golfing), Ella Fitzgerald Griffin, Peter Hitler (Adolf Hitler's younger brother), Jabba the Griffin, Ulysses S. Griffin, King Arthur Griffin, Ponce de León Griffin, Huck Griffin, John Wilkes "Photo Booth" Griffin, "Guy in the White Hat" Griffin, King of Denmark Griffin, and Queen of Burlesque Griffin, among others.

Peter and his family live in the fictional town of Quahog, Rhode Island, which is modeled after Providence, Rhode Island.

Peter primarily worked as a safety inspector at the Happy-Go-Lucky Toy Factory until his boss, Jonathan Weed, choked to death on a dinner roll while dining with Peter and Lois; he then became a fisherman on his own boat, which was known as the "S.S. More Powerful than Superman, Batman, Spider-Man, and The Incredible Hulk Put Together", with the help of two Portuguese immigrants, Santos and Pasqual, until his boat was destroyed. He now works in the shipping department of the Pawtucket Patriot brewery. Peter briefly played for the NFL's New England Patriots until his behavior resulted in his being kicked off the team in the episode "Patriot Games". Despite the unassuming nature of his occupation, he has had a variety of absurd and often surreal life experiences, which he candidly recounts frequently to his peers.

In several cutaway gags, Peter is shown to have previously held many jobs which require higher education, despite the blue-collar nature of most of his previous jobs: for instance working as a United Nations interpreter, a sonologist, an opera singer (with a band composed of four identical-looking men who call themselves "The Four Peters"), a bomb defuser, etc.

In a running gag, storylines are randomly interrupted by extremely long, unexpected fights between Peter and Ernie the Giant Chicken, an anthropomorphic chicken who serves as an archenemy to Peter. These battles parody the action film genre, with explosions, high-speed chases, and immense devastation to the town of Quahog.

== Character ==
=== Creation ===
MacFarlane initially conceived Family Guy in 1995 while studying animation at the Rhode Island School of Design (RISD). During college, he created his thesis film entitled The Life of Larry, which was submitted by his professor at RISD to Hanna-Barbera. MacFarlane was hired by the company. Then in 1996, MacFarlane created a sequel to The Life of Larry entitled Larry & Steve, which featured a middle-aged character named Larry and an intellectual dog, Steve; the short was broadcast in 1997 as one of Cartoon Network's World Premiere Toons. Executives at Fox saw the Larry shorts and contracted MacFarlane to create a series, entitled Family Guy, based on the characters. Fox proposed MacFarlane complete a 15-minute short, and gave him a budget of $50,000. Several aspects of Family Guy were inspired by the Larry shorts. While working on the series, the characters of Larry and his dog Steve slowly evolved into Peter and Brian. MacFarlane stated that the difference between The Life of Larry and Family Guy was that "Life of Larry was shown primarily in my dorm room and Family Guy was shown after the Super Bowl."

=== Voice ===
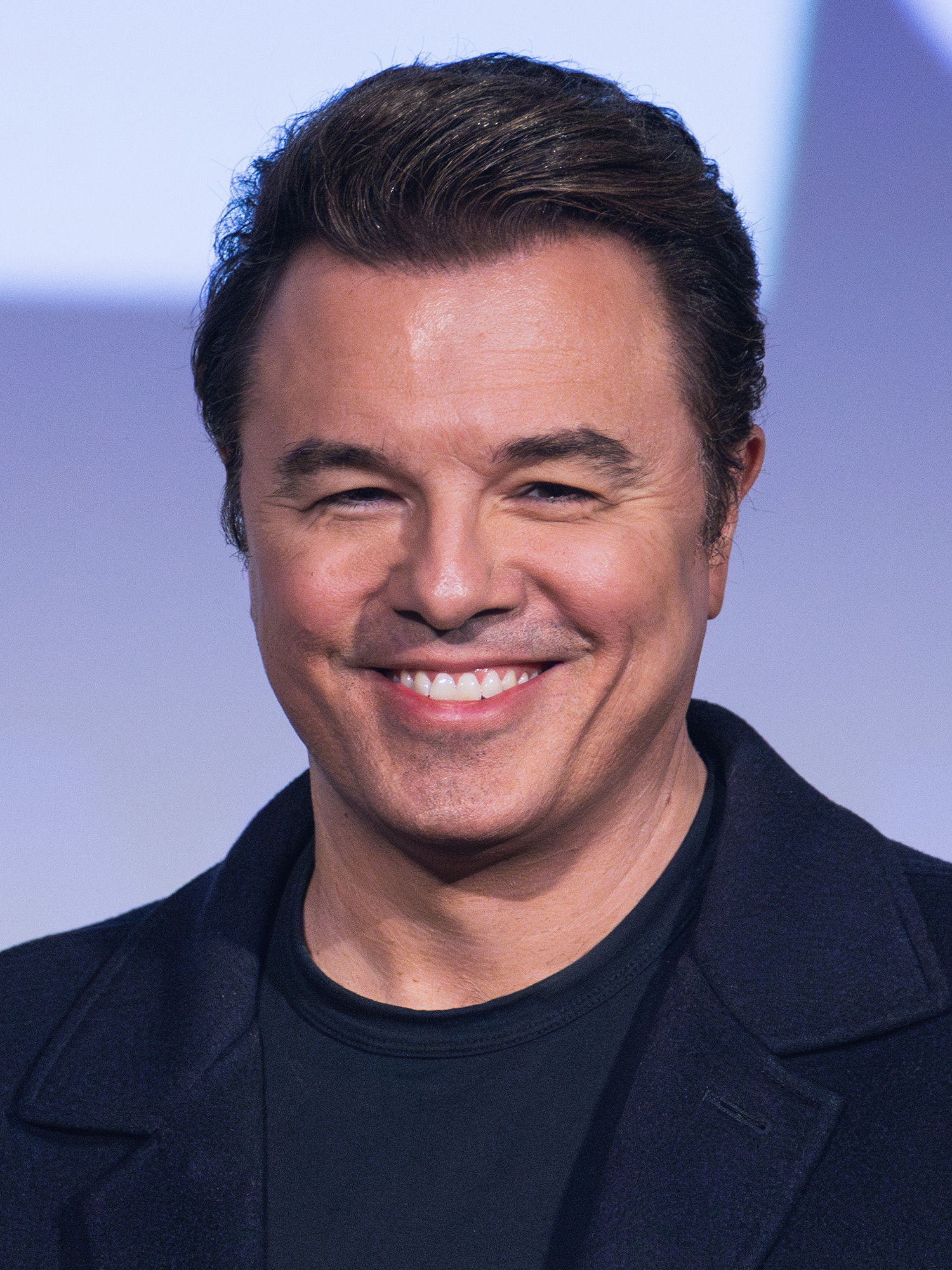
MacFarlane based Peter's voice on the voices of security guards he heard while he was attending the Rhode Island School of Design.

The voice of Peter is provided by MacFarlane, who also provides the voice for Brian, Stewie, Quagmire, Tom Tucker, Carter Pewterschmidt, Dr. Hartman, and others. MacFarlane has been part of the main voice cast from the beginning of the series including the pilot, and has voiced Peter from the start. MacFarlane chose to voice Peter and several other characters himself, believing it would be easier to portray the voices he already envisioned than for someone else to attempt it. MacFarlane's speaking voice is not very close to Peter's; he uses his normal voice as the voice of Brian. MacFarlane drew inspiration for the voice of Peter from the security guards he overheard talking while he was attending the Rhode Island School of Design; according to him, "I knew a thousand Peter Griffins growing up in New England. Guys who would not think before they spoke, like [switching to Peter's voice] there was no self-editing mechanism. [Pointing to himself] Everything in here, [pointing to his front] it's coming out here, with no gateway". MacFarlane also voices many of Peter's ancestors who share the same type of voice. He noted in an interview that he voices Peter and the rest of the characters partly because they initially had a small budget, but also that he prefers to have the freedom to do it himself. In another interview, he said that Peter's voice is one of the most difficult to do.

There have been rare occasions where MacFarlane does not voice Peter. In the episode "No Meals on Wheels" (season 5, 2007), Patrick Stewart voiced Peter in a cutscene, but MacFarlane voices Peter for the rest of the episode. In the episode "Family Gay" (season 7, 2009), Seth Rogen provided a guest-voice as Peter under the effects of the "Seth Rogen gene". In "Road to the Multiverse" (season 8, 2009), he was voiced by Jamison Yang, who was required for a scene where everything in the world was Japanese. In "Friends of Peter G" (season 9, 2011), John Viener voiced Peter in an alternate timeline where he gave up drinking.

=== Personality ===
Peter Griffin is a stereotypical blue-collar worker who frequently goes to a local bar with his neighbors and friends Cleveland Brown, Joe Swanson and Glenn Quagmire named "The Drunken Clam," Quahog's main tavern. In the season 4 episode "Petarded", Peter discovered his low intellect falls slightly below the level for intellectual disability after taking an I.Q. test, which places his I.Q. at around 70. In that same episode, Peter is declared intellectually disabled because of his low I.Q. level. Peter also might have brain damage in Wernicke's area as he cuts away into seemingly random situations and speaks in perfect grammar, but cannot seem to choose how to create a sentence. Peter is known for his brash impulsiveness, which has led to several awkward situations, such as attempting to molest Meg in order to adopt a redneck lifestyle. He is easily influenced by anyone he finds interesting and will often try to replicate their lifestyle and behavior merely out of curiosity. He is incredibly jealous of other attractions Lois has in her life, an attitude which has led to extreme situations, such as when he assaulted a whale that kissed Lois at SeaWorld. In the third season episode "Stuck Together, Torn Apart", Peter and Lois split up because of Peter's jealousy, only to discover that Lois has the same character flaw and the two decide to live together with their mutually jealous nature. Peter has a very short attention span which frequently leads him to bizarre situations, as Chris points out in "Long John Peter", after Peter's parrot dies "He will get over it pretty quickly and then move on to another wacky thing", to which Peter finds a pipe organ and forgets about his parrot (Peter then destroys the pipe organ within seconds and then finds a deed to a cattle ranch). Peter is also naïve with one example in "Airport '07" where he thinks his truck will fly by filling it with airplane fuel.

Peter has complex relationships with all three of his children. He normally makes fun of Meg since season six and treats her with neglect, such as in the episode "FOX-y Lady", where he, Meg and Chris try to create a cartoon and they exclude Meg and her ideas. Though in some episodes Peter has had a good relationship with Meg, in "Hell Comes to Quahog" (season 5, 2006), Peter almost tells Meg he loves her and in "Road to Rupert" (season 5, 2007), he told Meg that he would mistreat in front of the family, but that he would be her friend in secret. It was presumed though that in "Peter's Sister" (season 14, 2015), that Peter would stop bullying Meg. Peter has a much better, but usually one-sided, relationship with Stewie. Peter and Stewie had their adventures when he took him to Walt Disney World Resort in the episode "The Courtship of Stewie's Father" (season 4, 2005). With Chris, Peter communicates well, but at times when in need of advice or in an adventure Peter tells Chris to do the opposite of what he should do, like in "Long John Peter" (season 6, 2008), where Chris is asking for dating advice, and Peter tells him to treat women horribly.

Peter is best friends with his human-like dog, Brian. In earlier seasons, Brian often served as a voice of reason for Peter, helping him out with issues. Brian is extremely grateful to Peter for picking him up on the side of the road as a stray, shown during a flashback in the episode, "Brian: Portrait of a Dog". His gratitude was affirmed in "New Kidney in Town", where Brian offers to give up both his kidneys and his life so that Peter could undergo a kidney transplant, although he did not have to do it thanks to another, more suitable donor being found. At Brian's funeral in "Life of Brian", Peter said that Brian was his "best friend in the whole world" and "like a brother to him". In the episode "Forget-Me-Not", Stewie puts Brian and Peter, along with Joe and Quagmire, in a simulation to prove that they would have never been friends if Peter weren't Brian's owner, wherein they all wake up in a hospital after a great disaster of some kind and forget both their names. In the simulation, Joe and Quagmire believe that Peter was the cause of everybody in Quahog disappearing in the great disaster due to a fake newspaper clipping from a laser tag arena that they had visited with Peter earlier in the episode. Brian, who learns of Joe and Quagmire's plans, goes to talk to Peter to warn him, only for them to quickly bond and become great friends with each other. When Joe and Quagmire come to kill him, Brian saves Peter's life by taking a bullet for Peter, wherein the simulation then ends, and Stewie reveals what happened to him.

Beyond Brian and his main trio of Joe, Quagmire, and Cleveland, Peter is shown to be good friends with a few other characters in the show. Peter is shown to be acquainted with local pharmacist Mort Goldman, even going far as to assist Mort in committing insurance fraud by burning down his pharmacy. Mort even becomes Peter's manager when Peter and Quagmire become a musical duo in the episode "Into Harmony's Way". Peter and his core friend group are also shown to be good friends with Jerome, who initially served as Cleveland's temporary replacement in the episode he was first introduced (due to Cleveland living in Virginia at the time). Jerome would later buy the Drunken Clam in the episode "Save the Clam" and often interacts with Peter and the gang at the Clam. Peter and his friends even watch over the bar for Jerome in the episode "The Woof of Wall Street". Peter also maintains a friendly relationship with his co-workers, Opie and Stella.

=== Ancestry ===
"Head of the Griffin family is Irish-American Catholic Peter, an obese and bespectacled man who is just a big child – and has other roots besides his Irish ones, including African-American, Spanish, Scottish and German."

— James Bartlett, The Great Reporter.

Before Peter was born, his mother Thelma went to Mexico City to have an abortion but gave birth during the procedure, and smuggled him home to Providence, Rhode Island, where he spent his childhood. Peter was raised by Francis and Thelma Griffin in the Roman Catholic faith. In "Peter's Two Dads", he discovers that his biological father is an Irishman named Mickey McFinnigan. Peter visits Mickey, who initially rejects him. Mickey later accepts him as his son after beating him in the "game of drink" (the game of drink referring to matching shots until one passes out). Mickey is based on the friends of MacFarlane's father. MacFarlane said: "When I was growing up, my father had lots of friends: big, vocal, opinionated New England Irish Catholics. They were all bursting at the seams with personality, and Family Guy came out of a lot of those archetypes that I spent years observing."

Prior to the discovery of his true biological father, it was implied that Griffin had a black ancestor named Nate Griffin, who he discovered was a slave who was owned by his wife Lois' ancestors.

== Reception ==
=== Praise ===
"Many of the show's funniest moments come courtesy of Peter's shenanigans. Peter practically invented the "manatee joke," those signature cutaway gags that usually have nothing to do with the episode's plot but offer plenty of laughs anyway. These jokes have revealed, among other things, that Peter wasn't born a man, that he only recently graduated the fourth grade, and that even he doesn't find the comedic stylings of Paul Reiser funny".

— Ahsan Haque, IGN

Editors of Variety put Family Guy in their contenders for the 2011 Primetime Emmy Award for Outstanding Comedy Series; they stated that, depending on your sense of humor, Peter is either "a comedy genius" or "an obnoxious idiot". MacFarlane has been nominated for a Primetime Emmy Award in the Outstanding Voice-Over Performance category several times for voicing Peter and other characters; he won in 2016. He was also nominated in 2008 for an Annie Award in the Voice Acting in an Animated Television Production or Short Form for voicing Peter.

Peter has ranked in several of IGN's top 10s (generally these lists are related to the show). Among these, Peter ranked the third spot on IGN's "Top 25 Family Guy Characters," in which it was stated that many of the show's best gags come from Peter and his shenanigans and that "Peter practically invented the "manatee joke". Entertainment Weekly placed Peter in its "18 Bad TV Dads" list (the list also included characters like Homer Simpson and Al Bundy).

=== Criticism and controversy ===
Peter has been criticized for being too similar to Homer Simpson. Peter has appeared in some episodes of The Simpsons; in some of the episodes he has been featured in, he has been depicted as Homer Simpson's clone or accused of plagiarism. Ken Tucker of Entertainment Weekly wrote that Peter is Homer Simpson "as conceived by a singularly sophomoric mind that lacks any reference point beyond other TV shows". Robin Pierson from The TV Critic criticized the Griffin family for being too similar to the Simpson family, and said that Peter "has Homer Simpson written all over him". This is eventually made fun of in the episode "Ratings Guy" when, after Peter ruins television and goes to the networks to reverse the changes, Homer Simpson shows up with the same plight, with Peter going "A-ha! Looks like this is one we beat you to!" In "The Simpsons Guy", a crossover episode between Family Guy and The Simpsons, the Griffins end up in the town of Springfield after their car is stolen, where they meet the Simpsons. In the Simpsons episode "The Italian Bob", Peter is shown as an example of plagiarism, while American Dad! protagonist Stan Smith is labeled as plagiarism of plagiarism.

Peter has created some controversy in various episodes of Family Guy. The episode "The Cleveland–Loretta Quagmire" (season 4, 2005) featured a sequence titled "You Have AIDS", in which Peter dances and sings in a barbershop quartet fashion around the bed of a man with end-stage AIDS about his diagnosis, which drew protests from several AIDS service organizations. In the episode "When You Wish Upon a Weinstein" (season 3, 2003), Peter sings a parody song of "When You Wish upon a Star", entitled "I Need a Jew"; on October 3, 2007, Bourne Co. Music Publishers filed a lawsuit accusing the show of infringing its copyright on the original song; Bourne Co., the sole United States copyright owner of the song, alleged the parody pairs a "thinly veiled" copy of their music with antisemitic lyrics. The complaint was not upheld.

== Cultural influence ==
=== Appearances in the media ===
Peter has made several television appearances outside of Family Guy, often in the form of direct parody. Peter has appeared in two episodes of The Simpsons, poking fun at how the two shows are frequently compared to each other. In the fourteenth season episode "Treehouse of Horror XIII", Peter is depicted as one of Homer Simpson's clones, and in the seventeenth season episode, "The Italian Bob", photos of Peter and Stan Smith are in a book of criminals, which says they are wanted for "plagiarismo" and "plagiarismo di plagiarismo" respectively. In the Futurama direct to video film "Bender's Big Score", Philip J. Fry is seen nailing a "Family Guy 12 laughs a year" calendar which has Peter and Stewie on the cover. Peter also appeared in various episodes of the show's spin-off The Cleveland Show. In addition, Peter has appeared at the end of the American Dad! episode "Hurricane!" with guns on both Stan Smith and former neighbor Cleveland Brown. During the stand-off, Stan accidentally shoots his wife Francine, which Peter declares as "classic American Dad!".

=== Merchandise ===
Peter is also featured on the Family Guy: Live in Vegas CD, and plays a significant part in Family Guy Video Game!, the first Family Guy video game, which was released by 2K Games in 2006. Peter was used in the game Family Guy Online as a character class for the game's character creator. In December 2023, Peter was featured as a battle pass skin in the first season of the fifth chapter of Fortnite. Files containing clips of Peter were data mined from the game as early as February 2021.

MacFarlane recorded exclusive material of Peter's voice and other Family Guy characters for a 2007 pinball machine based the show, created by Stern Pinball. In 2004, the first series of Family Guy toy figurines was released by Mezco Toyz; each member of the Griffin family had their own toy, with the exception of Stewie, of whom two different figures were made. Over the course of two years, four more series of toy figures have been released, with various forms of Peter. Alongside the action figures, Peter has been included in various other Family Guy-related merchandise.

As of 2009, six books have been released about the Family Guy universe, all published by HarperCollins since 2005. This include Family Guy: It Takes a Village Idiot, and I Married One (ISBN 978-0-7528-7593-4), which covers the entire events of the episode "It Takes a Village Idiot, and I Married One", and Family Guy and Philosophy: A Cure for the Petarded (ISBN 978-1-4051-6316-3), a collection of 17 essays exploring the connections between the series and historical philosophers. which include Peter as a character. Peter appears in a comic book based on the Family Guy universe; by Titan Comics. The first comic book was released July 27, 2011.

In 2008, the character appeared in advertisements for Subway, promoting the restaurant's massive feast sandwich. Chief marketing officer Tony Pace commented "Peter's a good representation of the people who are interested in the Feast, and Family Guy is a show "that appeals to that target audience." The Boston Globe critic Brian Steinberg praised the restaurant's use of the character for the commercials.
