= Friends of Peter G. =

- Family Guy episode
- Episode no.: Season 9 Episode 10
- Directed by: John Holmquist
- Written by: Brian Scully
- Production code: 8ACX13
- Original air date: February 13, 2011

Guest appearances
- H. Jon Benjamin as Carl; Adam Carolla as Death; Chris Cox as AA member; Carrie Fisher as Angela; Phil LaMarr as Ollie Williams; Jessica Stroup as Crowd member; Laura Vandervoort as Jenny

Episode chronology
← Previous "And I'm Joyce Kinney"	Next → "German Guy"
- Family Guy season 9

"Friends of Peter G." is the tenth episode of the ninth season of the animated comedy series Family Guy. It aired on Fox in the United States on February 13, 2011. The episode follows Peter and Brian as they are forced to attend Alcoholics Anonymous meetings after causing an alcohol-fueled disruption at a movie theatre, which they do reluctantly. Eventually, after Peter crashes his car while driving home drunk, he is approached by Death, who shows him what his life will be like if he continues to drink heavily, as well as if he had never drank at all. Death persuades Peter that he has the willpower to put the bottle down sometimes.

The episode was written by Brian Scully and directed by John Holmquist. It received mostly mixed reviews from critics for its storyline and many cultural references. According to Nielsen ratings, it was viewed in 5.99 million homes in its original airing. The episode featured guest performances by H. Jon Benjamin, Adam Carolla, Carrie Fisher, Phil LaMarr, Jessica Stroup and Laura Vandervoort, along with several recurring guest voice actors for the series. It was first announced at the 2010 San Diego Comic-Con.

== Plot ==
When Brian and Peter decide to go and see The Sound of Music together, Peter sneaks in liquor, and the two become extremely intoxicated and disruptive, resulting in Joe being called upon to arrest them. In court, the two are ordered to attend Alcoholics Anonymous meetings for thirty days, much to their dismay. At the first meeting at the community center, Peter is told that alcohol is a bad part of his life, with Brian being reluctant to give up drinking. Realizing that the people in Alcoholics Anonymous have nowhere to drink without being judged, Brian and Peter decide to bring several cases of beer to their next meeting. Joe is once again called upon due to a noise complaint, causing everyone to transform the center into a church and spring into a large musical number ("Mr. Booze") in order to trick Joe into leaving.

Afterwards, Peter decides to drive home drunk, and ends up crashing into a tree, killing him instantly. Death arrives, and Peter's soul exits his body. Death decides to give Peter a second chance, and takes Peter into the future, where he sees what will result from his continued excessive drinking: an abusive, drunken and filthy man who tortures his family with cigar burns (which Stewie enjoys) and has sex with his boss Angela while at work. After seeing this, Peter wishes that he had never touched a drop of alcohol in his life, so Death also shows Peter what his life would be like without alcohol: he is extremely cheerful, has a different voice and drinks milk with uptight friends at the Drunken Clam, and he also does not know Joe or Quagmire, but instead looks at them as noisy and uncouth. Peter does not like this version of himself either. Death explains to Peter that he does not need to give up alcohol altogether, but to drink responsibly, and persuades him that he can live his life without being totally dependent on alcohol. Peter agrees to try, and is resurrected.

Afterwards, whenever Peter buys a 6-pack of beer, he takes three cans and throws them in the garbage, thus allowing him to drink in moderation, much to Lois' delight. The episode ends at a landfill site, where the seagulls become extremely intoxicated from drinking the beer that Peter threw away.

== Production and development ==
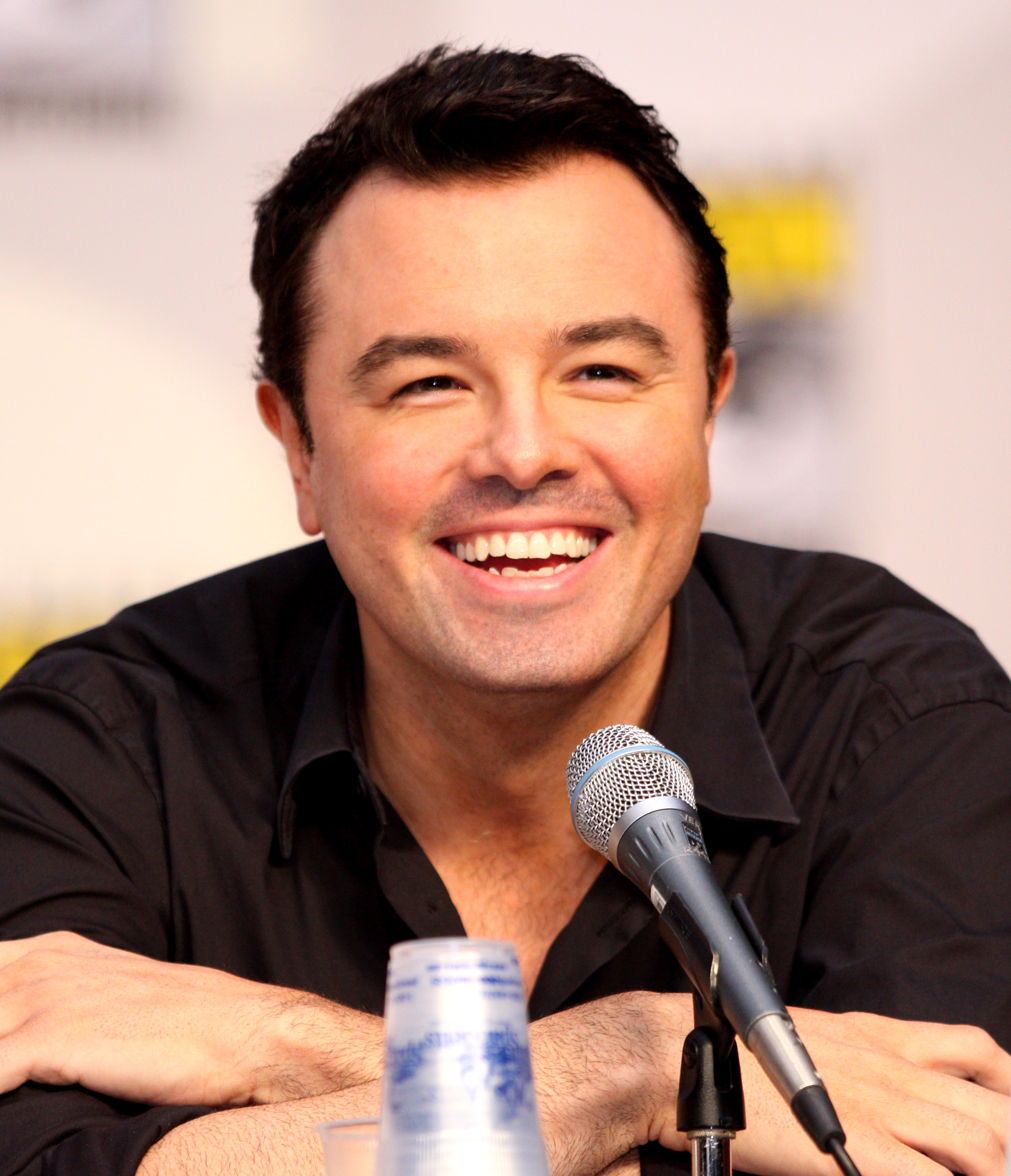
Seth MacFarlane announced the episode at the 2010 San Diego Comic-Con.

First announced at the 2010 San Diego Comic-Con by series creator and executive producer Seth MacFarlane, the episode was written by series regular Brian Scully and directed by series regular John Holmquist during the course of the ninth production season. Series veterans Peter Shin and James Purdum, both of whom having previously served as animation directors, served as supervising directors for the episode, with Andrew Goldberg, Alex Carter, Elaine Ko, Spencer Porter and Aaron Blitzstein serving as staff writers for the episode. Composer Walter Murphy, who has worked on the series since its inception, returned to compose the music for "Friends of Peter G".

In addition to the regular cast, voice actor H. Jon Benjamin, actor and radio host Adam Carolla, actor Chris Cox, actress Carrie Fisher, voice actor Phil LaMarr, actress Jessica Stroup and actress Laura Vandervoort guest starred in the episode. Recurring guest voice actors Ralph Garman, writer Steve Callaghan, writer Danny Smith, writer Alec Sulkin and writer John Viener made minor appearances throughout the episode.

== Cultural references ==
Peter refers to Rolf in The Sound of Music as "Ian Ziering." In a cutaway, 19th-century poet William Wordsworth writes the lyrics to "Gold Digger" by Kanye West. Peter says sarcastically that his drinking ruined his television show, 24, a reference to Kiefer Sutherland's drinking. Peter leads his Alcoholic Anonymous group in an elaborate rendition of the song "Mister Booze" from the 1964 film Robin and the 7 Hoods. Death tells Peter that humanity's greatest achievements include sending a man to the moon and making Justin Long a movie star, and Peter replies, "We did it with Justin Long, didn't we? America said no but we kept at it."

The episode's title comes from "Friends of Bill W.", a term used by Alcoholics Anonymous members to refer discreetly to each other.

== Reception ==
"Friends of Peter G." was broadcast on February 13, 2011, as a part of an animated television night on Fox, and was preceded by American Dad!, The Simpsons and Bob's Burgers, and followed by Family Guy creator and executive producer Seth MacFarlane's spin-off, The Cleveland Show. It was watched by 5.99 million viewers, according to Nielsen ratings, despite airing simultaneously with Desperate Housewives on ABC, the 53rd Grammy Awards on CBS and Harry's Law on NBC. The episode also acquired a 3.2 rating in the 18–49 demographic, beating American Dad!, The Simpsons, Bob's Burgers and The Cleveland Show in addition to significantly edging out all four shows in total viewership. The episode's ratings decreased significantly from the previous week's episode, largely due to the episode's airing simultaneously with the Grammy Awards.

Rowan Kaiser of The A.V. Club gave "Friends of Peter G." a negative review, calling it unfunny and stating that its message is "vaguely offensive", and he rated the episode D. Jason Hughes of TV Squad reacted positively to the episode, praising the musical number and the appearance of Adam Carolla as Death.
