= List of Family Guy characters =

Cast of American animated comedy franchise

Family Guy is an American animated sitcom originally conceived and created by Seth MacFarlane for the Fox Broadcasting Company.

Set in the fictional town of Quahog, Rhode Island, the show exhibits much of its humor in the form of metafictional cutaway gags often lampooning American culture. The following is an abridged list of characters consisting of the starring family (Griffins) and supporting characters. Characters are only listed once, normally under the first applicable subsection in the list; very minor characters are listed with a more regular character with whom they are associated.

== Appearances ==
Character	Voice actor	Family Guy																							
Character	Voice actor	1	2	3	4	5	6	7	8	9	10	11	12	13	14	15	16	17	18	19	20	21	22	23	24
Main characters
M Main R Recurring G Guest
Peter Griffin	Seth MacFarlane	M	M	M	M	M	M	M	M	M	M	M	M	M	M	M	M	M	M	M	M	M	M	M	M
Stewie Griffin	Seth MacFarlane	M	M	M	M	M	M	M	M	M	M	M	M	M	M	M	M	M	M	M	M	M	M	M	M
Brian Griffin	Seth MacFarlane	M	M	M	M	M	M	M	M	M	M	M	M	M	M	M	M	M	M	M	M	M	M	M	M
Lois Griffin	Alex Borstein	M	M	M	M	M	M	M	M	M	M	M	M	M	M	M	M	M	M	M	M	M	M	M	M
Chris Griffin	Seth Green	M	M	M	M	M	M	M	M	M	M	M	M	M	M	M	M	M	M	M	M	M	M	M	M
Meg Griffin	Lacey Chabert	M	M									G													
Meg Griffin	Mila Kunis		M	M	M	M	M	M	M	M	M	M	M	M	M	M	M	M	M	M	M	M	M	M	M
Cleveland Brown	Mike Henry	R	R	R	M	M	M	M	R	R	R	R	R	M	M	M	M	M	M	M					
Cleveland Brown	Arif Zahir																				M	M	M	M	M
Glenn Quagmire	Seth MacFarlane	R	R	R	M	M	M	M	M	M	M	M	M	M	M	M	M	M	M	M	M	M	M	M	M
Joe Swanson	Patrick Warburton	G	R	R	M	M	M	M	M	M	M	M	M	M	M	M	M	M	M	M	M	M	M	M	M
Recurring characters
R Recurring G Guest
Tom Tucker	Seth MacFarlane	R	R	R	R	R	R	R	R	R	R	R	R	R	R	R	R	R	R	R	R	R	R	R	R
Diane Simmons	Lori Alan	R	R	R	R	R	R	R	R	G									G						
Jonathan Weed	Carlos Alazraqui	R	R	R															G						
Loretta Brown	Alex Borstein	G	R	R	R			G											G						
Bonnie Swanson	Jennifer Tilly	G	R	R	R	R	R	R	R	R	R	R	R	R	R	R	R	R	R	R	R	R	R	R	R
Rupert	David Boat	G	R	R	R	R	R	R	R	R	R	R	R	R	R	R	R	R	R	R	R	R	R	R	G
Kevin Swanson	Scott Grimes	G	R	R	R	G					R	R	R	R	G			R	R	R	R			G	
Bruce	Mike Henry	G	G	G	R	R	R	R	R	R	R	R	R	R	R	R	R	R	R	R	R	R	R	R	R
Jake Tucker	Seth MacFarlane	G	R	R	R	R	G	G	R						G										
Judge Dignified Q. Blackman	Phil LaMarr	G	G	R	R	G	R	G	G	G	G	G	G				G		G						
God	Seth MacFarlane	G	R	R	R		G	R	R		G	R	R	R			R		G	R			G		
Jesus	Seth MacFarlane	G	G	R	R	R		R	R	G		G	R	G		R	G	G		G	G		G	R	
Carter Pewterschmidt	Seth MacFarlane		R	R	R	R	R	R	R	R	R	R	R	R	R	R	R	R	R	R	R	R	R	R	R
Babs Pewterschmidt	Alex Borstein		R	R	R	G	R	G	R	R	R	R	R	R	G	R	R	R	R	G	G	R		R	
Mayor Adam West	Adam West		R	R	R	R	R	R	R	R	R	R	R	R	R	R	R	R	G						
Tricia Takanawa	Alex Borstein		R	R	R	R	G	G	R	R	R	R	R	R	R	R	R	R	R	G	G				
Death	Adam Carolla (Note: Death was voiced by Norm MacDonald in his first appearance, "Death is a Bitch".)		R	R	R	G				G	G	G	G												
Dr. Elmer Hartman	Seth MacFarlane		R	R	R	R	R	R	R	R	R	R	R	R	R	R	R	R	R	R	R	R	R	R	R
Evil Monkey	Danny Smith		R	R	R	R	R	G	R											G					
Horace	John G. Brennan		R	R	R	R			R	R	R	R							G						
Jim Kaplan	Danny Smith		R	R	G	R		G		G					G										
Neil Goldman	Seth Green		R	R	R		G	G	G	G	G	G	R	R	R	R	G	R	R	R	G	G		G	G
Cleveland Brown, Jr.	Kevin Michael Richardson		R	G	G				G				G	R	R	R	R	G	R	G	R	R	R	R	
Ernie The Giant Chicken	Danny Smith		G		G	R		G	R	R	G	R			G	G	R	G	R	R	G	G		G	R
Connie D'Amico	Lisa Wilhoit		G	R	R	G	R	R	G	R	G					G	G	G	G					R	
Jasper	Seth MacFarlane		G	R	R							G	G					G		G					
Principal John Shepherd	Gary Cole		G	R		R		G	G	R	G	G	R	R	R	R	R	R	R	R	R	R	R	R	R
Francis Griffin	Charles Durning		G		R	G			G										G						
Thelma Griffin	Phyllis Diller		G	G	R	R	G					G	G				G		G						
John Herbert	Mike Henry			R	R	R	R	R	R	R	R	R	R	R	R	R	R	R	R	R	R	G		R	R
Mort Goldman	John Brennan			R	R	R	R	R	R	R	R	R	R	R	R	R	R	R	R	R	R	R	R	R	R
Muriel Goldman	Nicole Sullivan			R	R	G	G	R	G	G								G	G	G	G				
Seamus Levine	Seth MacFarlane			G	R	R	R	R	G	R	R	R	R	R	R	R	R	R	R	R	R	R	G	R	R
Ollie Williams	Phil LaMarr			G	R	R	R	R	G	R	G			G	G	G	R	G	R	G					G
Carol West	Julie Hagerty			G						G	R	R	R	R	G			G			G				
Greased-Up Deaf Guy	Mike Henry			G	R							G				G				G					
Angela	Carrie Fisher				R	R	G	G	R	R	R		R	R	R	R	R	R	G						
Esther	Christina Milian				R	R	G			G		G	G	G	G	R	R	G		G					R
Patty	Martha MacIsaac				R	R	G			G		G	G	G	G	R	R	G	G	G	G	G			G
Ruth Cochamer	Emily Osment				R	R	G			G	G	G	G	G	G	R	R	G	G	G	G				G
Opie	Mark Hentemann				R	R	G	R	R	G	R			G	R		R	R	R	G	G	G		R	G
James William Bottomtooth III	Chris Sheridan				R			R		G														G	
Jesse	Mike Henry				G	R			G	R			G		G			G							
Al Harrington	Danny Smith						R	R	G		G			R		G		G		R					
James Woods	James Woods				G		G		R	G	G			G		G									
Elle Hitler	Alex Borstein				G		G												R	R	G	R	R	R	R
Carl	H. Jon Benjamin				G	G	G	G	R	R	R	R	G	R	G	R	R	R	R	G	G			G	
Jillian Russell-Wilcox	Drew Barrymore					R	G	R		R		G	G				G								
Fouad	Mike Henry					G	R	G							G		R					G			
R.J.	Mike Henry					G	G		G	G					R	G	G								
Consuela	Mike Henry						R	G	R	R	R	R	R	R	R	G	R	R	G	R				R	G
Tomik & Bellgarde	John Viener						G		R	R	G		G	G			G								G
Tomik & Bellgarde	Alec Sulkin						G		R	R	G		G	G			G								G
Susie Swanson	Patrick Stewart							R		R	R	R	R	R	R	R		R		R	R	R			G
Ida Davis	Seth MacFarlane								G		G	G	R	G	R	G	R	G	R	R	R	G			G
Jerome	Kevin Michael Richardson								G			G	R	R	R	R	R	R	R	R	R	R	R	R	R
Donna Tubbs-Brown	Sanaa Lathan								G		G		R	R	R	R	R	R	R	R	R	R	R	R	R
Rallo Tubbs	Mike Henry								G	G			R	G	R	R	R	G	R		R	G	R	G	
Joyce Kinney	Christine Lakin									R	R	R	G	R	G	R	G	R		G				G	
Stella	Marlee Matlin										G		R	G		G	R		G	G	G				
Vinny	Tony Sirico												R			G									
Roberta Tubbs	Reagan Gomez-Preston												G	R	R	R	R	G	R		G	R	R	R	
Miss Tammy	Rachael MacFarlane													R	R	R		G			R	G			G
Bert & Sheila	Bryan Cranston																	R	R	G					
Bert & Sheila	Niecy Nash																	R	R	G					
Doug	Chris Parnell																	G	G	R	R	R			
Wild West	Sam Elliott																			R	R	R	R	R	R
Preston Lloyd	Peter Macon																				R	R	R	R	G

== The Griffin Family ==
=== Peter Griffin ===
Peter Löwenbräu Griffin Sr. (voiced by Seth MacFarlane) is the boisterous patriarch of the Griffin family and the titular "family guy" of the series. A 45-year-old Irish-American of blue-collar stock, he works at the Pawtucket Brewery and is most often portrayed as an obese, dim-witted, lazy yet energetic, outspoken, immature, and endearingly eccentric alcoholic whose antics drive much of the show's chaotic humor.

=== Lois Griffin ===
Lois Patrice Griffin (née Pewterschmidt), (voiced by Alex Borstein) is the volatile matriarch of the Griffin family and wife of Peter Griffin, serving as the mother of Meg, Chris, and Stewie. Born into the wealthy Pewterschmidt family, Lois rebelled against her privileged upbringing by marrying Peter, much to her father Carter’s disapproval. A 43-year-old housewife and former piano teacher, Lois is typically portrayed as warm, nurturing, sharp-witted, and the family’s voice of reason, but she sometimes displays moral ambiguity, impulsive behavior, hot-headedness, emotional detachment and a darker edge that can out rival Peter’s recklessness. Despite her outwardly composed demeanor, she has shown a taste for sadomasochism, gambling, and kleptomania, and has admitted to occasional bisexual experiences. Over the series, Lois has also been depicted pursuing various careers and hobbies—including theatre director, flight attendant, school board, modeling, church organist, teacher, professional boxing, journalism, and politics (former mayor of Quahog)—and holds a black belt in Taijutsu. Her relationships with her children, particularly Meg, oscillate between affection and coldness, underscoring her complex, satirical role as both caregiver and enabler within the show’s dysfunctional dynamic.

=== Meg Griffin ===
Megan "Meg" Griffin (voiced by Lacey Chabert in seasons 1 and 2 and by Mila Kunis from season 2 onward) is the Griffins’ 18-year-old daughter and eldest child. She is portrayed as a socially awkward and insecure teenager who attends Adam West High School. Throughout the series, Meg is frequently ridiculed and mistreated by her family and peers—particularly by her father Peter, and school bully Connie D’Amico. Her character is often used to satirize teenage insecurity and social alienation. Despite her negative treatment, Meg occasionally displays moments of confidence, assertiveness and talents that contrast with her usual portrayal.

=== Chris Griffin ===
Christopher Cross "Chris" Griffin (voiced by Seth Green) is the Griffins' 16-year-old son. He is a friendly, laid-back and slow-witted teenage boy who is a younger version of Peter physically, but intellectually, he often shows more potential, as demonstrated from moments of coherence and articulation within his speech.

=== Stewie Griffin ===
Stewart "Stewie" Gilligan Griffin (voiced by Seth MacFarlane) is the Griffins’ one-year-old youngest child, portrayed as an intelligent, intellectually gifted, sharp-witted, and articulate infant with an upper-class British accent and adult mannerisms. Originally depicted as a diabolical genius bent on world domination and matricide, Stewie has since evolved into a more complex character whose storylines often center on his scientific inventions, time-travel and multiverse adventures, and his close, sometimes adversarial friendship with the family dog, Brian. His ambiguous sexuality is a recurring theme, with creator Seth MacFarlane describing him as "almost certainly gay" but later clarifying that his orientation remains fluid and undefined. A recurring gag involves whether other characters can understand Stewie’s speech, as family members alternately appear to comprehend or ignore him depending on the episode. Stewie has become one of the series’ most recognizable and critically discussed characters.

=== Brian Griffin ===
Brian Edward Griffin (voiced by Seth MacFarlane) is the Griffins’ anthropomorphic white Labrador Retriever and the family's 10-year-old pet. Known for his sardonic wit and trademark martini, Brian exhibits humanlike intelligence and mannerisms, including the ability to speak, drive, and engage in complex reasoning. Brian is characterized as a cultured, intellectual figure with a fondness for literature, music, and philosophy, and is portrayed as an aspiring writer who once attended Brown University. He is also depicted as a drinker and smoker who occasionally struggles with substance abuse and romantic failures. A self-proclaimed atheist and political liberal, Brian often serves as the show’s voice of reason, contrasting with Peter’s impulsive nature, though his hypocrisy and insecurities are frequent comedic targets. His close friendship with Stewie is a central focus of the series, explored in numerous "Road to…" episodes. Despite his anthropomorphism, Brian retains several canine traits, such as fear of vacuums and attraction to female dogs.

=== Extended Griffin family members ===
The characters listed below are the extended family of the Griffin family that come from either Peter's side of the family, Lois's side of the family, and the occasional members of Brian's family:

- Francis Griffin (voiced by Charles Durning) is Peter's grouchy, stubborn and abusive 82-year-old Irish stepfather, Lois's stepfather-in-law and the step paternal grandfather of Meg, Chris and Stewie. He was married to Peter's biological mother Thelma Griffin. An obsessively devout Irish American Catholic, he hates Lois because she is not a Catholic, and often calls her a "Protestant whore", disapproves of his stepson's family's lifestyle, and frequently attempts to force his religious views on them. In "Peter's Two Dads", Francis attends Meg's 17th birthday party, and is crushed by a drunk Peter while attempting a unicycle trick to entertain the party guests as "Pee-Pants the Inebriated Hobo Clown". The injuries prove fatal, and as Francis is dying in the hospital, his last words to Peter before his death are, "Peter… you're a fat, stinking drunk." Shortly after, while Peter partakes in a hypnotherapy session, he realizes Francis was not his biological father when he recalls a childhood memory of him being explicitly told so by Francis. He appears once more as a vision of Peter's in "Family Goy".
- Mickey McFinnigan (voiced by Seth MacFarlane) is Peter's biological father, Lois' father-in-law and the biological paternal grandfather of Meg, Chris and Stewie. He lives in Ireland and is regarded as the town drunk (a highly respected position) in his neighborhood. Peter travels to meet him after he learns that Francis, who had just died, was not his biological father. He looks just like Peter, albeit he also wears a green vest and has a red beard, and has a talking sheep named O'Brian, with similar mannerisms to Brian. Despite that, he refuses to believe Peter is his son, so Peter then challenges him to a drinking contest and wins, which convinces him he is Peter's father.
- Thelma Griffin (voiced by Florence Stanley in the first appearance, Phyllis Diller in later appearances, Alex Borstein as a young woman in "Don't Be a Dickens at Christmas") is married to Francis, mother of Peter, mother-in-law of Lois and paternal grandmother of Meg, Chris and Stewie. She is an 85-year-old Irish American Catholic. "Mom's the Word" reveals that Thelma has died of a stroke.
- Aunt Helen (voiced by Ellen Albertini Dow) is Peter Griffin and Karen Griffin's aunt and Thelma Griffin's sister, the aunt-in-law of Lois Griffin and paternal great-aunt of Meg Griffin, Chris Griffin and Stewie Griffin. The Griffin family call her up in "Jesus, Mary, and Joseph".
- Chip Griffin (voiced by Seth MacFarlane) is Peter's vestigial twin brother, who appears in "Vestigial Peter". After he is surgically separated from the side of Peter's neck, Chip lives in the Griffin household for a short while before leaving, eventually landing a role on The Middle.
- Karen "Heavy Flo" Griffin (voiced by Kate McKinnon) is Peter's abusive older sister, who only appears in "Peter's Sister". She is the paternal aunt of Meg, Chris and Stewie and the sister-in-law of Lois. She is a professional wrestler and a catalyst for Peter’s behavior toward Meg. She ends up in a coma after Meg knocks her out in a match with a real chair instead of a fake one. Karen is hospitalized and is in need of a blood transfusion, but Peter refuses to check if he is the same blood type as her, leaving her fate unknown.
- Carter Pewterschmidt (voiced by Seth MacFarlane) is Lois, Carol and Patrick's father, Babs's husband, Peter's father-in-law and the maternal grandfather of Meg, Chris and Stewie. He is a cruel, selfish, petty, and prejudiced WASP old money multibillionaire industrialist, shipping mogul, and owner of several major companies. Though he generally despises Peter and disapproves of his marriage to Lois, he has occasionally teamed up with him to achieve some common purpose.
- Barbara "Babs" Pewterschmidt (née Hebrewberg) (voiced by Alex Borstein) is Carter's wife, the mother of Lois, Carol and Patrick, the maternal grandmother of Meg, Chris and Stewie and the mother-in-law of Peter. She is a Jewish American Holocaust survivor who concealed her identity to marry Carter.
- Carol Pewterschmidt-West (voiced by Carol Kane in the first appearance, Julie Hagerty in later appearances) is Lois and Patrick's sister, Peter's sister-in-law and the maternal aunt of Meg, Chris and Stewie. She has been married and divorced nine times. Due to all of her marriages and divorces, her full formal name is Carol Pewterschmidt-Johnson-Carrington-Stone-O'Craggity-Canseco-Shteinholtz-Washington-Proudfoot-Fong-West.
- Patrick Pewterschmidt (voiced by Robert Downey Jr. in the first appearance, Oliver Vaquer in the second appearance) is the 46-year-old older brother of Lois and Carol, the maternal uncle of Meg, Chris and Stewie and Peter's brother-in-law. His mother and father kept him secret from Lois as he was committed to a mental institution as a result of trauma from witnessing his mother having an affair with Jackie Gleason. After Peter unintentionally causes him to snap, he begins murdering fat men by strangling them and becomes known as "The Fat Guy Strangler". In the episode "Killer Queen", Patrick helps the Griffins track down an assailant who is trying to strangle Chris to death.
- Marguerite Pewterschmidt (voiced by Alex Borstein) was Lois’s wealthy, aristocratic great-aunt and Carter’s aunt. She was responsible for introducing Lois to Peter, whom she hired as one of her towel boys. Marguerite visited the Griffin family in the episode "Peter, Peter, Caviar Eater." Upon her arrival, she passed out and died, presumably from old age. In her will, she left Lois her Cherrywood Manor estate in Newport, allowing her to experience the Pewterschmidt lifestyle she had been missing out on.
- Lillian ("Lil") is Lois’s great-aunt. In the episode "I Am Peter, Hear Me Roar", Lois mentions that she had sent her wedding video cassette to Great-Aunt Lil, after Peter revealed that he had taped over it with soft-core cable porn. Not much is known about Lillian, other than the fact she lives in a nursing home. it’s unclear whether she is related to Lois’s father or mother.
- Jasper (voiced by Seth MacFarlane) is Brian's stereotypical flamboyantly homosexual 4-year-old cousin. Brian stays with him in Hollywood in "Brian Does Hollywood". Jasper's partner is a Filipino man named Ricardo, whom he marries in "You May Now Kiss the... Uh... Guy Who Receives".
- Bertram (voiced by Wallace Shawn) is the infant son of a gym teacher and her partner through artificial insemination. Bertram's biological father is Peter Griffin, and he holds a grudge against his half-brother Stewie. Bertram appears in "Emission Impossible", "Sibling Rivalry" and "The Big Bang Theory", the latter of which sees him traveling back in time to attempt to kill Stewie's ancestor, Leonardo da Vinci; although he succeeds, Stewie kills him and saves his own existence, as well as the entire universe (as Stewie became responsible for the Big Bang in the events of the episode).
- "Boston Stewie" is the result of an egg donation Lois made in 1997. He had been abandoned by his birth mother. Stewie tracked him down in Boston and tried to bring him into the family, without success. Boston Stewie ends up being adopted by Mark Wahlberg's sisters. His real name is never given.
- Dylan Flannigan (voiced by Seth Green) is Brian's human son. He first appears in "The Former Life of Brian". His mother Tracy was devastated when Brian left her. After Brian apologizes to Dylan for not being there for him, Brian turns his son's life around, making him into a charming, polite young man. Dylan then decides to leave the Griffin house and change his mother like Brian changed him. In "Brian's a Bad Father", Dylan returns as the star of a Disney Channel show.
- Biscuit is Brian's deceased mother, who appears in a flashback of "Road to Rhode Island". She was stuffed by her owners after her death. Brian went on to give her a proper burial. Biscuit is also in a flashback in "Chris Cross".
- Coco is Brian's deceased father who has never appeared on screen, but has been mentioned several times by Brian. According to Brian, Coco was racist towards African-Americans, and died after being run over by a milk truck.

Throughout the series, mainly during the first seasons, Peter mentions various ancestors of the Griffin family who are shown in cutaway gags.

== The Brown/Tubbs family ==
Brown/Tubbs families; from left to right: Cleveland Brown, Cleveland Jr., Donna Tubbs-Brown, Rallo and Roberta Tubbs.

=== Cleveland Brown ===
Cleveland Orenthal Brown Sr. (voiced by Mike Henry from 1999 to 2021, Arif Zahir from 2021 on) is a portly 42-year-old African-American man who is very polite to everyone and has a unique laugh. He was one of Peter Griffin's best friends in Family Guy and also owned and ran a deli. In the "Pilot" of The Cleveland Show, he moves to the town of Stoolbend, Virginia to show his son where he grew up, unintentionally meeting up with his old friend Donna, whom he was in love with despite her being unaware. Eventually re-sparking his relationship with her, they get married and he and his son move in with her and her two children. Cleveland is usually depicted as exceedingly gentle and patient, and it is only on rare occasions that he has been known to lose his temper and resort to violence. However, Cleveland gets visibly annoyed with racist behavior. He often acts as the voice of caution when other characters hatch harebrained schemes. Cleveland's speech is slow and almost elongated in Family Guy, but in The Cleveland Show his voice has a wide variety. Various flashbacks give conflicting histories of his speech patterns. He is a more sexual, obnoxious, unintelligent, selfish, and violent character in his new form than he was originally. After the show was not renewed for a fifth season, Cleveland moved back to Quahog (and Family Guy) in the twelfth season, now working as a mailman.

=== Loretta Brown ===
Loretta Marie Callender Brown (voiced by Alex Borstein) is Cleveland's late ex-wife and the mother of Cleveland Brown Jr. in Family Guy. In early episodes, Loretta had few lines, the bulk of which were "Mm-hmm!". She treated Cleveland harshly, and eventually cheated on him with Glenn Quagmire, leading them to divorce. She had a liking for cricket and the television program Friends. In The Cleveland Show episode "Gone With the Wind", she dies in a freak accident back in Quahog when in her 40s because Peter accidentally swings a Brontosaurus skeleton found by Brian from a mobile crane into her house, destroying it and causing her to fall from the second floor in her bathtub (in a similar manner to Cleveland in a running gag on Family Guy), only for her neck to snap. She was buried in Stoolbend, and left her fortune to Cleveland Jr. in her will.

=== Donna Tubbs-Brown ===
Donna Lou Retten Tubbs-Brown (voiced by Sanaa Lathan), is the second and current wife of Cleveland Brown and the stepmother of Cleveland Brown Jr.. She is 42 years old and works as the principal's secretary at Stoolbend High School. She has two biological children, Roberta and Rallo, from her previous marriage with Robert Unknown (his last name is literally "Unknown", which is a joke later in the series), and she has kept her maiden name (in "Pilot", Cleveland says, "Back in high school, I would have given anything to spend the night at Donna Tubbs' house."). While one of the main characters of The Cleveland Show, as of "He's Bla-ack!", she has now taken on the former role of the late Loretta as a recurring character of Family Guy.

=== Cleveland Brown Jr. ===
Cleveland Brown Jr.
- Family Guy / The Cleveland Show character
- First appearance: "Love Thy Trophy" (2000; Family Guy) "Pilot" (2009; The Cleveland Show)
- Created by: Mike Baker; Matt Weitzman; Seth MacFarlane
- Designed by: Seth MacFarlane
- Voiced by: Mike Henry (2000–2008; 2013); Kevin Michael Richardson (2009–present)

In-universe information
- Full name: Cleveland Raj Rerun Dwayne Brown Jr.
- Alias: Agent 14
- Nicknames: Junior, Chubster Dumbdumb
- Family: Cleveland Brown (father); Loretta Brown (deceased mother); Donna Tubbs (stepmother); Roberta Tubbs (stepsister); Rallo Tubbs (stepbrother)
- Spouse: Cecilia Brown (née Moreno) (m. 2012)
- Home: Quahog, Rhode Island
- Nationality: American
- Age: 14

Cleveland Orenthal Brown Jr. (also referred to as Cleveland Raj Rerun Dwayne Brown), better known simply as Junior (voiced by Mike Henry in early appearances in Family Guy, Kevin Michael Richardson in The Cleveland Show and later appearances in Family Guy), is the obese 14-year-old biological son of Cleveland Brown and his late ex-wife Loretta. He debuted in the second-season episode "Love Thy Trophy" on the animated TV show Family Guy. During his time in Family Guy before The Cleveland Show he was skinny, hyperactive, and athletic. He was presumably taken into Loretta's custody after she and Cleveland divorced in "The Cleveland-Loretta Quagmire" and has since become severely obese. He suffers from mild seizure-like episodes, which he calls "brainstorms", and takes medication to control them. The episode "The Hurricane!" reveals that he "doesn't believe in God", although he claims he is not an atheist either, which he calls "another religion". Junior is one of the main characters of The Cleveland Show and returns to the Family Guy cast as of "He's Bla-ack!" as a recurring minor character.

At 14 years old, Junior is the only child of Cleveland, the stepson of Donna Tubbs, and the stepbrother of Roberta and Rallo Tubbs. Upon his parents' divorce, Loretta gave custody of Cleveland Jr. to Cleveland and forced him to move. Cleveland and Junior left for California. However, en route, they decided to live in Stoolbend, Virginia, instead, where Cleveland married Donna Tubbs, and Rallo and Roberta became his stepsiblings. Junior's most prominent character traits are his laziness, obesity, and low social intelligence (although there are occasional references to him being academically bright).

==== Role in The Cleveland Show ====
Cleveland Jr. is a frequent target of weight-related jokes from a variety of characters in the series, in particular his stepbrother Rallo. When Rallo met Cleveland Jr. and his father, he often called them "fat". In the second episode, Cleveland Jr. served as a door in the bathroom so that he could earn his classmates' respect, which angered Cleveland. He exhibits a nervous and overly sensitive nature.

While Junior is not as active as he was in Family Guy, he has other hobbies and interests; he enjoys science and playing the tuba in the Stoolbend High School band, and is the leader of a troop of Freedom Scouts, Stoolbend's version of the Boy Scouts.

Cleveland Brown Jr. is married to Cecilia, as shown in "Y Tu Junior También", to prevent her deportation.

==== Character ====
===== Creation =====
Cleveland Jr. debuted in the season 2 Family Guy episode "Love Thy Trophy", but only made minor appearances thereafter. He was presumably taken into Loretta's custody after she cheated on Cleveland in "The Cleveland–Loretta Quagmire" and had since undergone a major character reinvention upon becoming a leading character in The Cleveland Show. After Cleveland and Loretta's divorce is finalized in the pilot episode of The Cleveland Show, a now-overweight Junior is placed in Cleveland's custody, and they move out of Quahog, Rhode Island to Stoolbend, Virginia where Cleveland rekindles a relationship with, and subsequently marries, his high school sweetheart, Donna Tubbs.

===== Design =====
In Family Guy, Cleveland Jr. was a hyperactive child of average size, but in The Cleveland Show, he had aged, gained weight, appeared potentially smarter, and wore glasses. In Family Guy, he wore a pink/light purple T-shirt, blue jeans and white sneakers, but in The Cleveland Show, he wears a red T-shirt, blue shorts, sneakers and glasses. He is also notably shorter, as Family Guy shows him to be of average height for his age, while in The Cleveland Show, he appears to be no more than 5 ft. at the age of 14.

Cleveland Jr. was a minor character who had a short time with Peter Griffin in the episode, "Fore Father", where he showed a talent for playing golf. After that episode, he made short appearances later in the show, with his last on Family Guy, until 2010 at his father's supposed funeral, along with Loretta.

===== Voice =====
Junior's voice is provided by Kevin Michael Richardson, who voiced other characters on The Cleveland Show, including Lester Krinklesac, Julius, and P-Hound. Prior to The Cleveland Show, Junior's voice was initially provided by Mike Henry in early Family Guy episodes.

Richardson stated that he describes voicing Cleveland Jr. as "a character he did on ER named Patrick, who was mentally impaired and wore a football helmet." Before the show aired in 2009, the show's panel appeared at the 2009 Comic Con International, and held a discussion about the show. When describing Junior's change in physical appearance and age, Mike Henry said "Cleveland Jr. really didn't have much to him and so he didn't appear for a while and so we sort of aged him up and made room for Rallo to be the younger one for a while." The show's creators later gave an explanation of Junior's altered look in "A Rodent Like This".

=== Roberta Tubbs ===
Roberta Coretta Tubbs (sometimes Roberta Benigni Tubbs; voiced by Nia Long in earlier episodes, Reagan Gomez-Preston in later episodes) is the 15-year-old biological daughter of Donna and her ex-husband, Robert, Rallo's sister, Cleveland's stepdaughter and Cleveland Jr.'s stepsister. She looks up to Tyra Banks, hoping to one day become her co-hostess. A relatively popular girl in school, Roberta is often seen socializing with her friends, both in person, and using phones/social networking websites. She has been dating a less-than-respectable boy named Gabriel "Federline Jones" Friedman. Donna does not approve of Federline, though Cleveland has since managed to bully him into submission. As with many popular students, Roberta often acts as a bully and a self-centered character, even towards her own family members. She is revealed to be a genius in The Cleveland Show season 3 episode "B.M.O.C.", when she went on a college tour to Cleveland's alma mater, State.

Neither Roberta nor her brother Rallo are initially pleased with the arrival of Cleveland and Cleveland Brown Jr., though both appear to accept their mother marrying Cleveland without much issue. Roberta and Cleveland seem to fall into a rather stereotypical stepfather/stepdaughter relationship, with Roberta being embarrassed by her stepfather's behavior when he attends social functions at her school. Eventually she accepts Cleveland as her father. While one of the main characters of The Cleveland Show, as of "He's Bla-ack!", she is now occasionally referred to and less frequently seen on Family Guy. She is the only member of the Tubbs family that has yet to speak in Family Guy.

=== Rallo Tubbs ===
Montclair "Rallo" Tubbs (voiced by Mike Henry from 2009 to 2014) is the 5-year-old biological son of Donna and her husband, Robert, Roberta's brother, Cleveland's stepson and Cleveland Jr.'s stepbrother. Despite his age, and the fact that his father has been mostly absent most of his life, Rallo acts much like Robert, at times very articulate, yet hormonally charged. He seems to get along fairly well with his mother, Donna, and has a normal love/hate relationship with Roberta, who at times seems to neglect him, yet at other times speaks to him as an intellectual equal.

In The Cleveland Show season 3 episode "American Prankster", Cleveland asks Donna why his name is Rallo. Donna replies that it was from "that guy from Sanford and Son" (referring to Rollo Lawson). One of the main characters of The Cleveland Show, as of "He's Bla-ack!", he is now an infrequently appearing cast member of Family Guy.

=== Extended Brown family members ===
- Evelyn "Cookie" Brown (voiced by Frances Callier) is Cleveland's mother, Donna's mother-in-law, Roberta and Rallo's step-grandmother and Cleveland Brown Jr.'s paternal grandmother. Her first appearance was in the episode "A Brown Thanksgiving". She deeply cares about her son and is prone to babying him, but also often stands by her husband. She is hypercritical of her new daughter-in-law Donna, having never forgiven her for spurning Cleveland in favor of Robert in high school, although Cleveland is oblivious to their rough relationship. In "Baby Stewie", Cookie is stated to have died of a heart attack, though this is revealed to be false in "Karenheit 451" by her presence as being alive and well.
- LeVar "Freight Train" Brown (voiced by Craig Robinson) is Cleveland's 63-year-old father, Cookie's husband, Donna's father-in-law, Roberta and Rallo's step-grandfather and Cleveland Brown Jr.'s paternal grandfather, whose first appearance is in the episode "A Brown Thanksgiving". He tends to take his wife for granted and is often verbally and physically abusive to Cleveland; the latter is revealed to be because of the latter's ineptitude at a family game show when he was a kid, costing the Browns a victory.
- Broderick Brown is Cleveland's brother and Cleveland Brown Jr.'s uncle who is a doctor who first appears in the Family Guy episode "He's Too Sexy for His Fat". In The Cleveland Show he appears in the episode "Our Gang", which reveals that he left his career as a plastic surgeon in Quahog to enlist in the navy, and he rescues Cleveland and Cleveland Jr. from a drug gang by trading Afghani heroin to the gang for their freedom.
- Robert (voiced by Corey Holcomb) is Donna's 42-year-old ex-husband and the biological father of Roberta and Rallo. At the start of the show, he had grown negligent of the statuses of his children, not even knowing their names or ages, which convinced Donna to accept Cleveland as her true love.
- Kevin "Auntie Momma" Tubbs (voiced by Kym Whitley as a female, Kevin Michael Richardson as a male) is Donna's caring, lovable, eccentric aunt who is in her 60s. She is a large, fat woman whose appearance and mannerisms are a parody of Tyler Perry's character Madea. Auntie Momma was originally Donna's Uncle Kevin and when Donna was younger, her parents were never around. So Uncle Kevin creates the character of Auntie Momma in order to provide Donna with a strong female influence in her life.
- Dorothy "Dee Dee" Tubbs (voiced by Phylicia Rashad) is Donna Tubbs' long-lost mother, Cleveland's mother-in-law, Cleveland Brown Jr.'s step-grandmother and Roberta and Rallo's grandmother. In the season three episode "Mama Drama", they are reunited, and she becomes a recurring character for the remainder of the series. In the last episode of season 4, Dee Dee begins a relationship with Robert (her daughter's ex-husband), and they adopt a 5-year-old Chinese boy named Quang Quang. The season 14 episode "Candy, Quahog, Marshmallow!" reveals Dee Dee committed suicide.
- Quang Quang (later Hong-Kong-Phooey) is the 5-year-old adopted Chinese boy of Dee Dee and Robert. This makes him Donna's adopted brother, Cleveland's adopted brother-in-law, Cleveland Brown Jr.'s adopted step-uncle, and both the adopted brother and uncle of Roberta and Rallo, whom Donna refers to as their "bruncle". Near the end of the episode, Quang Quang was christened with the new name Hong-Kong-Phooey by Reverend Jenkins.

== Neighbors and their relatives ==
=== Spooner Street ===
==== Quagmire family ====
- Glenn Quagmire (voiced by Seth MacFarlane) is the Griffins' sex-addicted, next-door neighbor and one of Peter's best friends. He is an airline pilot for Spirit Airlines (as revealed at the end of "Passenger Fatty-Seven") and a former member of the US Navy, but is best known for his extreme sexuality and saying "giggity" and "all right" or yelling "oh!" after innuendos.
- Crystal Quagmire (voiced by Alex Borstein in "Fore, Father", Allison Janney in "Quagmire's Mom") is the mother of Glenn, Gary and Brenda Quagmire, the grandmother of Anna Lee and Courtney, and the ex-wife of Dan. Her first appearance was in "Fore Father", where she is in a flashback breastfeeding Glenn. Crystal was once very promiscuous and neglectful of her son, but it is revealed that prior to the events of the episode "Quagmire's Mom", she has become a born-again Christian.
- Ida Davis (voiced by Seth MacFarlane), born Daniel Quagmire, is the transgender parent of Glenn, Gary and Brenda Quagmire, the grandparent of Anna Lee and Courtney, and the ex-spouse of Crystal Quagmire, first appearing in the episode "Quagmire's Dad", where she undergoes a sex-change operation. Like her son, Ida is a military veteran and was a war hero in the Vietnam War. She has an on-again off-again relationship with Brian.
- Brenda Quagmire (voiced by Alex Borstein in "Jerome Is the New Black", Kaitlin Olson in "Screams of Silence: The Story of Brenda Q") is the sister of Glenn and Gary Quagmire, the aunt of Anna Lee and Courtney, and the daughter of Dan and Crystal, who used to be in an abusive relationship with a man named Jeff Fecalman, whom Quagmire murders in retribution.
- Gary Quagmire is the brother of Quagmire and Brenda, the uncle of Anna Lee and Courtney, and the son of Dan and Crystal that was mentioned in "Jerome Is the New Black" and "Screams of Silence: The Story of Brenda Q". In "Jerome Is the New Black", he is stated to be deaf.
- Anna Lee (voiced by Mae Whitman) is Quagmire's infant daughter that was revealed in "Quagmire's Baby". She was the result of a one-night stand and was left on his doorstep.
- Courtney Quagmire (voiced by Mandy Moore) is the biological daughter of Glenn Quagmire as revealed in the episode "No Giggity, No Doubt". She is one of Quagmire's several daughters like Anna Lee.

==== Swanson family ====
- Joseph "Joe" Swanson (voiced by Patrick Warburton) is the Griffins' neighbor and Peter's friend. He is a 46-year-old "macho", paraplegic police officer in the Quahog Police Department. Despite his condition, and the constant mockery he endures from Peter and their friends, Joe still proves to be an extremely skilled police officer, as he is constantly pursuing criminals or rescuing victims with the aid of his wheelchair and even goes so far as to abandon it to complete his work. In spite of their close friendship, Joe has never hesitated to arrest Peter, Lois, Brian, Meg, or Stewie when they break the law.
- Bonnie Swanson (voiced by Jennifer Tilly) is Joe's calm and soft-spoken 46-year-old wife who is the mother of Kevin and Susie Swanson, and the daughter-in-law of Bud Swanson. She is pregnant from her first appearance in "A Hero Sits Next Door" in season one until "Ocean's Three and a Half" in season seven, in which she gives birth to her and Joe's daughter Susie.
- Kevin Swanson (voiced by Seth MacFarlane in early appearances, Scott Grimes in later appearances) is Joe and Bonnie's 25-year-old son and Susie's brother. He was mainly in the first three seasons, only making occasional appearances after that with no speaking parts. He enlisted in the US Army and served in the Iraq War but after witnessing American treatment of Iraqi civilians he chooses to desert, faking his death after a cellphone bomb attached to a turkey kills his platoon on Thanksgiving. He returns to his parents in episode "Thanksgiving". He has depression, behavioral disorders and PTSD.
- Susan "Susie" Swanson (inner monologue provided by Patrick Stewart) is Joe and Bonnie's 1-year-old daughter who was born in the episode "Ocean's Three and a Half".
- Bud Swanson (voiced by Ed O'Neill) is Joe's father, Bonnie's father-in-law, and Kevin and Susie's grandfather, whose only appearance so far was in "Papa Has a Rollin' Son". Peter and friends set up Bud to visit his son in Quahog for Father's Day, only to learn from Joe that his father frequently makes fun of handicapped people and he doesn't know his own son is now a paraplegic, so Peter and Joe pretend to be each other in front of Bud in hopes that he won't find out the truth.

==== Goldman family ====
- Mortimer "Mort" Goldman (voiced by Johnny Brennan) is a pharmacist who is of Polish-Jewish descent, and one of Peter's friends. He runs Goldman's Pharmacy and was married to Muriel Goldman, with whom he had one son, Neil. Mort's family are stereotypes of American Jews. He gets remarried to a woman named Rachel in season 19.
- Neil Goldman (voiced by Seth Green) is Mort and Muriel's stereotypically nerdy son, who is Chris' best friend at Adam West Regional High School, despite differing ages. He is also a classmate of Meg's and has a borderline-obsessive crush on her, although he seems to have gotten over this crush as of "Once Bitten". He is the editor of the school's newspaper, is a member of the A/V Club, and works at his father's pharmacy, where he is employee of the month.
- Muriel Goldman (voiced by Nicole Sullivan) is Mort's 42-year-old wife and Neil's mother, whose physical appearance is very similar to her husband's. She met Mort via a video dating service, and they had their first kiss at age fourteen while both were suffering from a cold. Muriel died in "And Then There Were Fewer" where she is stabbed by Diane Simmons upon becoming a witness to her plot to kill James Woods and frame Tom Tucker.
- Rachel Goldman (voiced by Courtenay Taylor) is Mort's second wife and Neil's stepmother. She makes her appearance in the episode "The Marrying Kind", where she and Mort have their wedding in New Orleans.

==== Other residents ====
- John Herbert (voiced by Mike Henry) is an elderly pedophile (more specifically, a pederast) who is often referred to solely by his last name. He resides down the street from the Griffin family and distributes Popsicle ice pops to small children in his basement. He has a particular interest in Chris; in the episode "Play It Again, Brian", Chris finally begins to show some level of suspicion and asks Herbert, "Are you a pedophile?", to no onscreen answer. Also, in "Spies Reminiscent of Us", Stewie refers to a "pedophile who lives down the street" about which nobody is taking any action "because he's so funny", clearly talking about Herbert. He has a dog named Jesse, who is also very old and is unable to use his hind legs. He has a high-pitched, very soft effeminate voice and pronounces sibilant consonants with a high-pitched whistle. Herbert is often wearing a light blue robe and slippers, walks with a walker and frequently makes inappropriate, sexually tinged comments to teenage boys (in "Road to the North Pole", Herbert wants a little drummer boy for Christmas, while staring at a poster of Nick Jonas). It is revealed later that he is the eldest member of the Skull and Bones secret society. He was a corporal in the United States Army and a POW during World War II. Herbert plays Obi-Wan Kenobi in the Star Wars episodes. In "And Then There Were Fewer", he drove an ice cream truck which in past episodes he has used to lure little boys. In "Internal Affairs", Herbert's ice cream truck is hijacked and destroyed during one of Peter and the Giant Chicken's fighting rampages. In an interview, Henry stated that he based Herbert's voice on an old man he used to meet at a grocery store. Before the character was used for the show, Mike would use the Herbert voice to motivate stalled writers at meetings. He also appeared in The Cleveland Show episode "It's the Great Pancake, Cleveland Brown" as Cleveland Jr.'s first house when he was trick or treating. "Valentine's Day in Quahog" reveals that Herbert's first name is John and that he has a grandniece named Sandy.
- Doug (voiced by Chris Parnell) is a smug, condescending and insufferable toddler who lives in the Griffins' neighborhood and attends day care with Stewie, with whom he shares a rivalry. He was first introduced in "Island Adventure", and in most of his appearances, he usually shows up for the sole purpose of insulting Stewie. In "LASIK Instinct", Doug is hit by Lois' car due to her waning vision, and the men of the Griffin household are tasked with looking after him in his father's absence. Doug eventually reveals that he was faking the list of demands, as his parents are neglectful to both him and each other, and he just wanted to have fun. Stewie agrees to be friends with him privately, so long as they agree to remain rivals in public. During a heart-to-heart in "80's Guy", Doug reveals that he mainly antagonizes Stewie because he's intimidated by his brilliance and envious of his hair. Doug dies offscreen in a commuter plane crash in "The Candidate", as casually revealed by Stewie.

=== Grace Street ===
The principal supporting characters of The Cleveland Show (2009–2013). Left to right: Ernie Krinklesac, Tim the Bear, Cleveland Jr., Arianna the Bear, Terry Kimple, Rallo Tubbs, Donna Tubbs-Brown, Cleveland Brown, Roberta Tubbs, Federline Jones, Lester Krinklesac, and Holt Richter.

In The Cleveland Show, a number of characters live on the same street as the Brown family. All attended the wedding of Cleveland and Donna Brown.

==== Bear family ====
- Tim (voiced by Seth MacFarlane in seasons 1–3, Jess Harnell in seasons 3–4) is one of Cleveland and Donna's neighbors in Stoolbend who happens to be an anthropomorphic brown bear. He is 39 years old (as revealed in the season 3 episode "Skip Day") and lives with his wife, Arianna, and his son, Raymond. He becomes Cleveland's drinking buddy at The Broken Stool, where he also converses with Holt and Lester.
- Arianna (voiced by Arianna Huffington) is married to Tim and one of Cleveland and Donna's neighbors in Stoolbend. Arianna has a son named Raymond. Like her son and husband, Arianna is a brown bear.
- Raymond (voiced by Nat Faxon) is the teenage son of Tim and Arianna and neighbors with Cleveland and Donna in Stoolbend. He appears briefly in the pilot at Cleveland and Donna's wedding.

==== Krinklesac family ====
- Lester Krinklesac (voiced by Kevin Michael Richardson) is one of Cleveland and Donna's neighbors in Stoolbend, Lester is a hillbilly with a large beer gut. He becomes Cleveland's drinking buddy at The Broken Stool, conversing with Tim and Holt.
- Kendra Krinklesac (voiced by Aseem Batra) is married to Lester and the mother of Ernie. While having been slender in her early life, Kendra is now morbidly obese and uses a mobility scooter to get around.
- Ernie Krinklesac (voiced by Glenn Howerton) is the 17-year-old son of Lester and Kendra, and Cleveland Jr.'s best friend. Ernie first appeared in the episode "Pilot" at Cleveland and Donna's wedding.
- (Unnamed Sister) is Lester's unnamed sister, Kendra's sister-in-law and Ernie's aunt who is a stripper.
- Princess is Krinklesac family's pet opossum.

==== Richter family ====
- Holt Richter (voiced by Jason Sudeikis) is a short frat-boy wannabe.
- Mrs. Richter (voiced by Fergie) is the unnamed and unseen mother of Holt, who lives with him and still treats him like a child.
- General Richter (voiced by Will Arnett) is the strict father of Holt, who works in the military.

==== Choni's family ====
- Choni (voiced by Rosie Perez) is the aunt of Cecilia, the aunt-in-law of Cleveland Brown Jr., and the mother of Marco. She is the owner of a Mexican restaurant called Choni's Cantina.
- Cecilia Moreno-Brown (voiced by Elia Saldana) is the 16-year-old niece of Choni and wife of Cleveland Jr. who works at her aunt's restaurant but wants to go to college to become a nurse.
- Marco is Choni's young son, Cleveland Brown Jr.'s cousin-in-law and Cecilia's cousin. He is only shown in the episode "There Goes El Neighborhood" when Choni asks Cleveland to babysit him while she went out.
- Sofía Vergara (voiced by herself) is depicted as the fictional aunt of Cecilia. In The Cleveland Show, Sofía Vergara appears in the Mexican segment of "Wide World of Cleveland Show".

== Co-workers ==
The following characters have worked with Peter and Cleveland at different jobs:

=== Happy-Go-Lucky Toy Factory ===
- Mr. Jonathan Weed (voiced by Butch Hartman in the pilot pitch, Carlos Alazraqui in the TV series) is the owner of the Happy-Go-Lucky Toy Factory, where Peter originally worked under his supervision. He spoke with a strong Spanish accent and was described as an "effeminate weirdo" by his employees. He disapproved of nearly all of Peter's actions, mainly because most of them were detrimental to the company, and fired or came close to firing Peter on multiple occasions. In "Mr. Saturday Knight", he is invited to the Griffins' house for dinner. He promotes Peter to head of toy development and minutes later chokes to death on a dinner roll after it was Heimlich maneuvered out of Brian's throat and into Mr. Weed's throat; the half-eaten dinner roll was taken into police custody. His video will describes how the factory will be replaced by a children's hospital starting "now", at which point the demolition machinery promptly starts tearing through the factory, endangering everyone present. His great-grandfather's surname was "Bermudagrass" but was changed to Weed at Ellis Island. In the episode "Lois Kills Stewie", Stewie tells Lois, before attempting to shoot her, "Say hello to Cleveland for me, Oh, and Mr. Weed".

=== Peter's ship ===
- Santos and Pasquale (voiced by Denis Martell and Mark Peredes) are a pair of Portuguese immigrants who do not speak English. All of their dialogue is subtitled and not understood by the other characters. In "From Method to Madness", they lament leaving Portugal for various low-paying jobs in Quahog such as caterers, fishermen, janitors, and babysitters. Peter treats them poorly while they worked for him as fishermen aboard his ship. In return, they urinate in his refreshments when the opportunity arises, as in "The Cleveland-Loretta Quagmire". In this episode, Pasquale saves Joe's life after he nearly drowns by using CPR. This prompts Lois to demand that Peter take CPR classes in order to learn what to do should the situation happen again.

=== Pawtucket Brewery ===
- Pawtucket Pat (voiced by Michael McKean) is the original Willy Wonka-like owner and mascot of the Pawtucket Patriot Brewery. So far, he has only appeared in the season 2 episode "Wasted Talent" and was mentioned in the season 4 episode "Jungle Love" when Peter started working at his brewery stating that Pat sold his brewery. A public statue of his ancestor – also called Pawtucket Pat – in the eponymous episode "Pawtucket Pat" becomes the center of controversy when it is revealed that he stole the recipe for Pawtucket Patriot Ale from the Narragansett tribe. After a publicized debate on whether the statue should be torn down, a group of Narragansett descendants intervene and their leader gives his say, stating that the pressing issue is not the injustices that Native Americans have faced in the past, but how society can help Native Americans today. Following this, the statue is relocated to the Quahog Museum.
- Angela (voiced by Carrie Fisher) was the former overseer of the Pawtucket Brewery's shipping department, and the supervisor of Peter, Opie, and later Stella. She likes Opie far better than Peter, and treats Peter very coldly, repeatedly rewarding Opie as employee of the month. However, Angela fires Opie in "The Blind Side". Peter tried to befriend her based on her love of animals, but ended up horrifying her by staging a bloody cockfight in her house. In "Peter-assment", Angela sexually assaults Peter after he comes to work without wearing his glasses (which were broken at the time). After Peter refused to have sex with her and cheat on Lois, she tried to gas herself in her car. After Peter rescued her, it was revealed that she has not dated anyone in ten years. Feeling sorry for her, Peter disguised himself as a stereotypical 1920s New York billionaire and had sex with her. Angela knew it was really Peter, but what she did not know was that Peter, as a means of remaining faithful to Lois, hid Mort Goldman (who did it for $2) in his pants so it was Mort who actually had sex with her, not Peter. In "The Simpsons Guy", Angela attended the trial in Springfield between Duff Beer and Pawtucket Patriot Ale. Following Carrie Fisher's unexpected death on December 27, 2016, Seth MacFarlane revealed that Angela would appear on at least two more episodes that Fisher had already done voiceover work on in season 15, but would not comment on the character's future except by saying that "Family Guy will miss [Fisher] immensely." Her final appearance was during the sixteenth-season episode "Don't Be A Dickens At Christmas", aired on December 10, 2017. The episode "Pawtucket Pete" states that Angela had died after going swimming less than 20 minutes after she had eaten, presumably by way of getting a stomach cramp and drowning, as claimed in Peter's eulogy for her. Peter mentions to the audience, "That's a real thing, kids – listen to your mothers."
- Opie (voiced by Mark Hentemann) is a seemingly mentally disabled and gibberish-speaking co-worker of Peter at the Pawtucket Brewery and ward of the state. He has won "Employee of the Month" at least twenty times and has been promoted ahead of Peter. He appears to have intellectual disability and never really does anything about it. He sometimes tells Peter to stick his finger in his mouth, only to bite it. He wears two different shoes on each foot. He once went for a haircut that went horribly awry. No one other than Angela seems to understand what he is saying. However, Peter has understood him in some instances, such as when he gets fired. In "Whistle While Your Wife Works", Opie was forced to watch Peter and Lois have sex in his office at the brewery. In "Blue Harvest", he played a Tusken Raider. In "New Kidney in Town", Peter sends him a shout-out on The Price is Right. In "It's a Trap!", he plays a small amphibious alien that swallows the door droid, voiced by Consuela, from Jabba the Hutt's (Joe Swanson) palace. In "The Blind Side", Opie is fired from his position for masturbating on the job (Peter comments that "the underside of [his] desk looks like Carlsbad Caverns") and is replaced by a deaf woman named Stella. However, he has since been rehired as he has been seen employed at the brewery in later episodes such as "The Birthday Bootlegger". He makes a cameo crowd appearance when Peter proposes reinstating the city government in "Tea Peter". Opie can also be seen as Stewie rides through town under Brian's car in "Family Guy Viewer Mail 2". In "The Simpsons Guy", Opie attended the trial in Springfield between Duff Beer and Pawtucket Patriot Ale. "Underage Peter" reveals that Opie is not disabled, but rather spoke gibberish due to being constantly under the influence of alcohol.
- Fouad (voiced by Mike Henry) is one of Peter Griffin's co-workers at the Pawtucket Brewery. He is a recent immigrant to the United States, apparently of Arab ethnicity. In all his appearances, he has demonstrated that he is extremely earnest in his attempts to learn a Western sense of humor and understand its subtleties, such as the nature of a sarcastic or ironic comment. He laughs in a loud manner at sarcastic or ironic statements before explaining why the joke was funny (for example, "Ahh! Is funny because..."). Peter does not seem to have a strong relationship with Fouad, likely due to his comparatively short time employed at the Pawtucket Brewery, but Peter gets along much better with Fouad than he does with Opie or Angela. Fouad first appears in "Chick Cancer", being introduced by Peter as that foreign guy at work who helped him understand sarcasm. In "Blue Harvest", Fouad plays Lieutenant Shann Childsen on the Death Star prison deck, who laughs when Chewbacca (played by Brian) asks for a cell by the pool, stating that it is funny because prisons do not have luxury areas such as swimming pools. In "Padre de Familia", Peter suspects that Fouad may be an illegal immigrant and is angered because of it. Fouad's voice is heard off-camera in a DVD-exclusive scene in "Three Kings". In "The Shawshank Redemption" segment, Captain Byron Hadley (played by Seamus) yells for lights out, calling the inmates "ladies", and Fouad remarks that it is funny because they are men.
- Stella (voiced by Marlee Matlin) is an attractive deaf worker at the Pawtucket Brewery. She debuted in "The Blind Side" as Opie's successor.
- Bert and Sheila (voiced by Bryan Cranston and Niecy Nash) are an interracial married couple who become the new managers of the Pawtucket Brewery Shipping Department in "Pawtucket Pete" following the death of Angela. They were hired to replace Angela because Paul McCartney and Stevie Wonder's "Ebony and Ivory" was the favorite song of one of the Pawtucket Brewery's shareholders. The characters were dropped before season 20 for unknown reasons and they were succeeded by Preston Lloyd.
- Preston Lloyd (voiced by Peter Macon) is the no-nonsense overall manager of the Pawtucket Brewery who succeeds Bert and Sheila in season 20. Despite managing a brewery, he finds alcohol repulsive and does not drink. He speaks in a deep, monotone voice.

=== Waterman Cable ===
- Lloyd Waterman (voiced by Bruce McGill) is the head of Waterman Cable, who hires Cleveland to be a salesman. His workers are Terry and Tim the Bear.
- Terry Kimple (voiced by Jason Sudeikis) is Cleveland's 42-year-old best friend from high school, who once took the fall for him when the two were busted for smoking marijuana.
- Arch (voiced by Mike Henry) is an employee of Waterman Cable. He seems to be very serious, being quite a stickler when it comes to office etiquette.
- Aaron (voiced by Alec Sulkin) is one of Cleveland's co-workers. He once helped Cleveland win a Civil War reenactment of "The Battle of Stoolbend" against B. Emerson Plunkett V.
- Florence (voiced by Mike Henry) is Lloyd Waterman's assistant who seems to be more favored than the other employees.
- Jane (voiced by Fergie) is a worker at Waterman Cable.
- Tori (voiced by Rutina Wesley) is a worker who first appears in "Frapp Attack". She becomes friends with everyone in the office, especially Cleveland (much to Donna's dismay).

== Students and teachers ==
=== Adam West High School ===
The following characters make up the school body of Adam West High School (previously named James Woods Regional High School):

- Principal John Shepherd (voiced by Gary Cole) is the principal of Adam West High School. He was revealed to be Jewish in "When You Wish Upon a Weinstein". In "The Simpsons Guy", Principal Shepherd attended the trial in Springfield between Duff Beer and Pawtucket Patriot Ale, where he was placed next to Principal Skinner. In "The Peter Principal", Principal Shepherd had a bitter divorce and breakdown causing the board of education to put him on an indefinite paid leave. As Vice-Principal Brenda McGuire was found dead in her car, the board of education asks for someone to come forward to be the interim principal until a permanent replacement for Principal Shepherd can be found. When Lois anonymously tipped off the board of education about how Peter was helping Meg and her friends on their revenge on the mean students, the board of education intervenes causing them to fire him and reinstate Principal Shepherd after he recovered from his divorce following his sex trip to Thailand. "Crimes and Meg's Demeanor" reveals Principal Shepherd's first name to be John, and he lives in an apartment building across from the building that is managed by Lou Spinazola. After a confrontation with Stewie and Brian over what appeared to have been him killing his ex-wife Fiona, which ended with Brian falling out of the window, Principal Shepherd admitted to the police and the medic about him living off food taken from the school to make ends meet when the police find the bag that supposedly leaked blood.
- Mr. Berler (voiced by Seth MacFarlane) is one of Meg's teachers at Adam West High School. In "The Kiss Seen Around the World", he disagrees with Neil Goldman's selection of James T. Kirk as the better Star Trek captain, supporting Captain Jean-Luc Picard as the superior officer. In "The Simpsons Guy", Mr. Berler made a cameo at the trial in Springfield between Duff Beer and Pawtucket Patriot Ale.
- Connie D'Amico (voiced by Fairuza Balk in "Let's Go to the Hop" and Lisa Wilhoit in all subsequent appearances) is the head cheerleader and most popular girl at Adam West High School. Connie is a beautiful and popular yet narcissistic and mean-spirited girl who tends to look down on those who are either socially inept or unpopular and encourages the other popular students who she is friends with to bully them, with Meg being a favorite target of this abuse. She is most often seen with her closest friends: Gina, Scott, and Doug. While a bully to most students lacking popularity and confidence, Connie does have a softer side; in "Stew-Roids", Connie begs Meg for help after she realizes what it is like to be shunned and ridiculed by her classmates. In the same episode, she fell in love with (and dated) Chris when she realized how nice and kind he can be. In "Let's Go to the Hop", she dances with Peter when he went undercover as "Lando Griffin" at the Winter Snowball dance. In "Connie's Celica", her harassment of Lois as the school's new music teacher earns her expulsion. In revenge, she attempts to fake her death in a car accident by putting Peppa Pig in a blonde wig in the driver's seat and frame Lois for murdering her by dismantling the brakes. She later appears in season 23's "Live, Laugh, Love" as part of a school trip to Washington, D.C., implying that her expulsion was reversed.
- Gina (voiced by Alex Borstein in earlier appearances, Camille Guaty in later appearances, and Nina Dobrev in "Trading Places") is a popular student and cheerleader at Adam West High School who is Connie D'Amico's best friend.
- Beth (voiced by Lisa Wilhoit) is a blonde girl who is one of Meg's friends in the early seasons.
- Esther (voiced by Tamera Mowry in "Barely Legal" and "Peter's Daughter", Christina Milian in later episodes) is an African-American girl who is one of Meg's friends.
- Patty (voiced by Alexandra Breckenridge in "Barely Legal", Barclay DeVeau in "Halloween on Spooner Street", Martha MacIsaac in later episodes) is a redheaded girl who is one of Meg's friends. She has two mothers, implying that her biological mother is a lesbian. Brian briefly had a crush on her after realizing she has a more attractive body than she seems.
- Ruth Cochamer (voiced by Natasha Melnick in earlier appearances, Emily Osment in later appearances) is one of Meg's friends. Her tongue is supposedly cut off during her and Meg's trip to Paris when they are kidnapped in "Leggo My Meg-O".

=== Stoolbend High School ===
- Principal Wally Farquhar (voiced by Will Forte) is the 42-year-old Principal of Stoolbend High and a former high-school classmate of Cleveland's. He hates both Cleveland and Terry because they bullied him in high school.
- Gabriel Friedman (voiced by Jamie Kennedy), more commonly known as Federline Jones, is Roberta's Jewish classmate and boyfriend. He is a reference to rapper Kevin Federline/"K-Fed".
- Oliver Wilkerson (voiced by Mike Henry) is a popular deaf jock and school bully at Stoolbend High School. He is the captain of the school football team and often teases and torments Cleveland Jr. He leads the popular kids at his school and his closest friends are apparently Derek, Laine, and Reggie, although they are often seen without him.
- Derek (voiced by Julius Sharpe) is one of Oliver's friends at Stoolbend High School. He is also possibly his right-hand man and like Oliver, he wears a letterman's jacket and is on the school softball team and possibly the football team as well. When he attempts to join the others in making fun of other students (notably Cleveland Jr.), he goes much too far by often making incredibly inappropriate comments (such as describing things as "gay"), much to Laine's anger.
- Laine (voiced by Alec Sulkin) is one of Oliver's friends at Stoolbend High School. He is apparently the most intelligent of Oliver's main group of friends.
- Reggie (voiced by Clarence Livingston) is one of Oliver's friends at Stoolbend High School. He is most likely the most humorous of Oliver's gang. His catchphrase is "Whoa!" and he reveals early in the series to have testicular cancer.
- Kenny West (voiced by Kanye West) is the slick rapper of Stoolbend High. He first appears in "Brotherly Love". Cleveland Jr. and Kenny get in a rap battle to impress a girl. Then he re-appeared in the first episode in season 2 where Cleveland Brown helped to jump start Kenny's musical career. He has a daughter named Candace who is the same age as Rallo.

=== Harper Elementary School ===
- Mrs. Hadassah Lowenstein (voiced by Alex Borstein) is Rallo's kindergarten teacher at Harper Elementary School. In the pilot episode, she expelled Rallo from school for pulling down her pants, but Cleveland convinced her to give him another chance. She is a stereotypical Jew; when Cleveland asks if he can call her Hadassah, she says "Ochay", referring to the stereotypical "ch' sound heard in Hebrew and Yiddish.
- Julius Nemeth (voiced by Kevin Michael Richardson) is one of Rallo's best friends, along with Walt, who attends Harper Elementary School. He writes a blog titled "Out & About with Julius".
- Walt Fuller (voiced by Al Thompson) is one of Rallo's best friends, along with Julius, who attends Harper Elementary School.
- Theodore Parker Jr. III (voiced by T-Pain) is one of Rallo's friends at Harper Elementary School. He is good friends with Bernard.
- Bernard Bernard (voiced by will.i.am) is one of Rallo's friends at Harper Elementary School. He is good friends with Theodore.
- Hot Wheels (voiced by Mike Henry) is one of the kids at Harper Elementary School. He wears roller blades. Despite being in kindergarten, he already shows signs of being part of an "alternative lifestyle". He resembles former American Idol contestant Adam Lambert.

== Other recurring characters ==
=== Quahog Channel 5 News ===
- Tom Tucker (voiced by Seth MacFarlane) is the arrogant, baritone male news anchor at Channel 5. He was an actor before moving to Quahog.
- Diane Simmons (voiced by Lori Alan) is the station's 40-year-old former news co-anchor and talk show hostess. In "And Then There Were Fewer", Diane orchestrates a plot to murder James Woods and frame Tom Tucker for the crime; in the process, she murders Quagmire's date Stephanie, Woods' girlfriend Priscilla, Muriel Goldman, and Derek Wilcox. When Lois finds out, Diane takes Lois hostage and attempts to kill her on a cliffside, but she is shot with a sniper rifle by Stewie, who wishes to kill Lois himself, and falls to her death.
- Joyce Kinney (voiced by Christine Lakin) is the station's latest news co-anchor, who was introduced in the episode "Excellence in Broadcasting" as a successor to the late Diane Simmons. She is 45 years old and went to the same high school as Lois, who pulled a prank on her in front of the entire school, and as revenge, years later, she broadcast a news story about Lois having starred in a pornographic film in an attempt to get the entire city of Quahog to shun her and her family. This lasted until Lois showed the film in the church, which impressed everyone but Joyce. Her birth name was Joyce Chevapravatdumrong; she uses the surname Kinney in professional work.
- Tricia Takanawa (voiced by Alex Borstein (from 1999 to 2021)), typically referred to as "Asian reporter Tricia Takanawa" by her colleagues, speaks in a nasal monotone cadence that Borstein has described as "all presentation and no substance". She is confirmed as being Japanese in Stewie Griffin: The Untold Story.
- Ollie Williams (voiced by Phil LaMarr) is Channel 5's Blaccu-Weather Forecast meteorologist. Ollie Williams is a fast-talking African-American man who rarely speaks for more than about 3 seconds. His news reports are always rapidly spoken and loud. His hyperkinetic style was a result of alcoholism. Ollie has only spoken for longer than a few seconds on two occasions, one in an episode where Ollie and Tom were talking about him stuck in a rainstorm with his umbrella blown away, and in "Lois Kills Stewie" where he recaps the previous episode, "Stewie Kills Lois".

=== West family ===
- Mayor Adam West (voiced by Adam West) is the Mayor of Quahog, named after the actor who provides his voice. He is a highly odd and delusional politician. He is good-natured but generally irresponsible. He has a love affair with Meg in "Deep Throats". Mayor West played Grand Moff Tarkin in "Blue Harvest". As of "Brothers & Sisters", he marries Lois' sister Carol, making him Peter and Lois' brother-in-law and the uncle by marriage of Meg, Chris and Stewie. In "The Simpsons Guy", Mayor Adam West attended the trial in Springfield between Duff Beer and Pawtucket Patriot Ale, where he was sitting next to Mayor Joe Quimby. In "Adam West High", Mayor Adam West has died, as Brian persuades Principal Shepherd to rename his high school after West. The episode "Wild Wild West" marked the debut of Mayor West's cousin Wild West.
- Wild West (voiced by Sam Elliott) is Mayor Adam West's rural cousin who is in his 60s like his cousin. In his titular debut episode, Peter requests he run for mayor of Quahog following the death of Adam and he chooses to run, defeating his competitor, the librarian Elle Hitler (who claims she is of "no relation"). He offhandedly mentions killing a man twice in his debut and owns a farm where he raises livestock including sentient mustaches.
- Old West (voiced by Gerald McRaney) is Mayor Wild West's father and Mayor Adam West's uncle. He is an outlaw who abandoned his family to keep his own son from becoming one himself. Every year on Father's Day Mayor Wild West ambushes his father for abandoning him and his mother. They eventually make up. He appears in episode 12 of season 21.
- Allen (voiced by Tony Hale) is Mayor Wild West's stepfather, who steps in to fill the void in Mayor Wild West's life after being abandoned by Old West. Episode 12 of season 21 reveals that he doesn't believe in vaccines.

=== Quahog residents ===
- Bruce Straight (voiced by Mike Henry) is a 52-year-old mustached man who speaks effeminately in a calm, drawn-out voice with a slight lisp, as well as occasionally smacking his lips before a sentence. Though he was not given a name until the episode "No Chris Left Behind", he has appeared in several episodes without being named on-screen; however, he is referred to in commentary tracks prior to that episode as "the Performance Artist". He even comments on it the first time his name is spoken in the series. He has several catchphrases, the most notable being "Oh, no!" He first appeared as the clerk of an "exotic entertainment" shop in the season 1 episode "Chitty Chitty Death Bang", and was then sitting astride an obese donkey at the Renaissance fair when Peter fought the Black Knight. He has since had a variety of jobs including a deacon, a therapist, a medium, a lawyer, a masseur and a barman. More recently, he was working at the bowling alley renting shoes in "The Splendid Source", refereeing the boxing match where Lois fought Deirdre Jackson in "Baby, You Knock Me Out", and working at Quahog Laser Tag in "Forget-Me-Not". He has also trained to be a police officer, taught a CPR course, chaired the Quahog Alcoholics Anonymous meetings and entertained children at the Quahog Library. He is a member of the school board committee of Adam West Regional High School. Although Bruce himself generally makes limited appearances, his voice is lent to a number of anthropomorphic creatures including a large bee, the shark in a parody of Jaws, a Xenomorph from a parody of Aliens, a Tetris block, and a giant mutant rat. In "Blue Harvest", he played the role of Greedo. He makes an appearance as Admiral Piett on the Imperial Star Destroyer in the episode "Something, Something, Something, Dark Side". Bruce is openly gay, although he initially does not want to admit it to his parents, Phil and Candy Straight, who insisted on him meeting a woman. His partner/fiancé is his roommate Jeffrey (in "Road to the North Pole", Bruce states in the song "All I Want for Christmas" that his Christmas wish is a wedding ring from Jeffrey). In the episode "BFFs" of The Cleveland Show, Peter says that Bruce was his therapist and referred to him as "that gay guy who has, like, a thousand jobs". Another character voiced by Mike Henry who was heavily implied to be Jeffrey appeared in both the Family Guy episodes "Friends of Peter G." and "Finders Keepers", and The Cleveland Show episode "Die Semi-Hard" before being confirmed to be Jeffrey in "Underage Peter". He also appeared in a deleted scene of the episode "Stewie is Enceinte", adopting Stewie's human-dog hybrid puppies at an animal shelter with Bruce. Bruce tends to give unsolicited advice about mundane subjects, often during critical events. This occurs most notably during his training as a 911 operator. When a victim calls to report a man in her home, he provides tips for being a good host to unexpected guests. In "The Simpsons Guy", Bruce attended the trial in Springfield between Duff Beer and Pawtucket Patriot Ale, where he was sitting next to Waylon Smithers. In "Meg's Wedding", Bruce briefly had a romantic relationship with Meg. However, they ended it on the wedding day and Bruce finally got engaged to Jeffrey, and they marry in the parking lot outside of the church, since the priest wouldn't allow them to marry in the church. Bruce is widowed in "The Fat Lotus" when Jeffrey is killed by a shark.
- Carl (voiced by H. Jon Benjamin) is the manager of the local gas station and convenience store called the Quahog Mini Mart. He speaks in a calm, monotone voice and shows almost no emotion regarding anything happening around him. Carl is a cinephile, having an obsession with films and attractive actresses. In "Road to the North Pole", he wants a Blu-ray of The Wiz for Christmas. He goes out of his way to discuss exciting movies. He becomes friends with Chris, when Chris worked for him in "Movin' Out (Brian's Song)". Their friendship is based on their mutual interest in movies. He does not get along well with Meg, although he did once hire her to work in the store. "Friends of Peter G." reveals that he knows so much about movies because he is an alcoholic and he spent so much time in his house and watched every film he could get his hands on. In the Star Wars episodes, Carl plays Master Yoda.
- Consuela (voiced by Mike Henry) is a Hispanic maid who, in one cut-away gag, is shown as the head of the Maids' Union. She speaks broken English and usually says "No, no, no...", whenever asked to do anything. She first appears in "Believe It or Not, Joe's Walking on Air" demanding Lemon Pledge in a court case. She answers the door as Superman's maid at the Fortress of Solitude in "Stewie Kills Lois", telling Joe and the police officers that Superman is not home. She appears in a cutaway in "Ocean's Three and a Half" on the game show Are You Smarter Than a Hispanic Maid?. In "Dog Gone", she goes to work for the Griffin family, but proves to be so annoying that they drug her with chloroform and leave her with Joe. She has a nephew named Mikey, who sells light-up yo-yos, and a son named Rodrigo, who is in prison. Another of her nephews was molested by James Woods before he committed suicide, as revealed in "And Then There Were Fewer" when she was working as Woods' maid. In "Stewie Goes for a Drive", Stewie runs away from home and ends up in a bad neighborhood. Consuela finds and takes him to her home and puts him in her bathtub, which is also being used to make soup for a quinceañera celebration being held at her house. Brian tracks Stewie to Consuela's house but she refuses to let him go, claiming that Stewie is her son "Ernesto". Consuela appears as Darth Vader's maid in "Something, Something, Something, Dark Side", and as the controller of the security system at the palace of Jabba the Hutt in "It's a Trap!". She also appears as Donna's housekeeper in The Cleveland Show season 3 episode "Die Semi-Hard". "Valentine's Day in Quahog" reveals that Consuela has a husband who is still living in Mexico, and to see him annually on Valentine's Day, she crosses the border illegally into Mexico. In "The Simpsons Guy", Consuela attended the trial in Springfield between Duff Beer and Pawtucket Patriot Ale, where she was sitting next to Bumblebee Man due to their both being Hispanic. "Dearly Deported" reveals that Consuela has an attractive niece named Isabella who has two sons of her own.
- Death (voiced by Norm Macdonald in the first appearance, Adam Carolla in later appearances) is the Grim Reaper figure in the form of a skeleton in a black robe who seldom removes his hood. Underneath his hood is a human skull with spiders and snakes crawling in and out of the eye sockets, mouth, and ear cavities as seen in "Death Lives". He is in "Mr. Saturday Knight" when Mr. Weed dies after choking during dinner at the Griffins'. "I Take Thee Quagmire" reveals that anyone who touches his bones dies instantly (though "Death Is a Bitch" seems to contradict this, but while Stewie rubs his ankle to heal it faster, Death being out of commission, no one at all is able to die). In "Wasted Talent", Death comes to a college campus where a party had taken place and everybody is dead with beer bottles around the room. After doing his deed, he drinks some beer bottles to try to find a silver scroll (for Pawtucket Pat's contest). He ends up getting drunk and crashes his car. In "Friends of Peter G.", Death shows Peter what his life would be like if he continues to drink as much as he does, and if he does not drink at all. Peter learns to control his drinking from this. Death later ends up in a car crash in "Grumpy Old Man", leading him to be taken away by "Super Death" (a larger version of himself), who tells him he was going to be reincarnated as a Chinese child. He disappears only to reappear seconds later, as he was reincarnated a Chinese baby girl. In "3 Acts of God", Death takes Peter, Quagmire, Cleveland, and Joe to speak to God.
- Elle Hitler (voiced by Alex Borstein) is Quahog's local librarian, originally named Joanna in her earlier appearances. She first makes two minor appearances in "Petergeist" and "Movin' Out (Brian's Song)", before making her first major appearance many seasons later in the episode "Wild Wild West" where this episode had her renamed Elle Hitler. She claims to be of no relation to infamous dictator Adolf Hitler. When the townspeople greet her with "Hi, Elle Hitler", it is a homophone of "Heil Hitler".
- Dr. Elmer Hartman (voiced by Seth MacFarlane) is the Griffins' incompetent doctor who works at Quahog's hospital. Dr. Hartman is generally an unskilled doctor, though his skills fluctuate from episode to episode. In one episode, he mentions his Yale Medical School degree, but then implies it is a product of his calligraphy skills. Occasionally, he seems to know exactly what he is doing and performs great medical feats, such as plastic surgery to restore Peter's face; in other episodes, he does not even understand common medical terminology, or needs a chart to find body parts and lets Meg take care of patients while he is gone, as in "You Can't Do That on Television, Peter". He temporarily loses his medical license in "Stewie Loves Lois" when Peter accuses him of rape (it turns out that Hartman had merely performed a normal prostate exam, though Peter did not understand the procedure). He regains his license after treating Peter's urination problem. In "Believe It or Not, Joe's Walking on Air", Peter brought up the fact that Hartman sounds very similar to Carter Pewterschmidt when he speaks. Hartman responds that Carter is one of his patients and that there are only so many voices in the world; some are bound to be similar and that he never noticed because they do not talk all that much despite the fact that Carter is a patient of his. This was brought up to turn the fact that MacFarlane voices both Hartman and Carter into a comical situation. His name comes from MacFarlane's close friend and fellow animator Elmer "Butch" Hartman. In "New Kidney in Town", Hartman gives Peter one of his kidneys because the Griffin family are his last paying customers. Also in the episode, Hartman reveals that while attempting to clone a chicken, he inadvertently created the Giant Chicken, which Peter says he will want to discuss with Dr. Hartman later. "Secondhand Spoke" reveals that Hartman has a gay son. "Ratings Guy" reveals that Hartman is the worst doctor at Quahog's hospital. Dr. Hartman is implied to have a history of alcohol misuse, as he is shown attending Alcoholics Anonymous meetings in "Friends of Peter G.". In "The Simpsons Guy", Dr. Hartman was among the Quahog citizens to attend the trial between Pawtucket Patriot Ale and Duff Beer in Springfield. He was seated next to Dr. Nick Riviera (who was also an incompetent doctor). In "Once Bitten", Dr. Hartman enlisted his dad to get him and Seamus into a movie theater. "Papa Has a Rollin' Son" reveals that Hartman has dyslexia. Hartman is the general doctor for the Griffin family, and they usually go to him for emergencies and surgeries.
- Frank Sinatra Jr. (voiced by himself) is a singer, songwriter and conductor who meets Brian Griffin in "Brian Sings and Swings" following his near-death experience. Frank gives him some words of wisdom before taking the stage at the Quahog Cabana Club. Brian and Frank start to sing together, and eventually Stewie Griffin joins them, forming the "New Rat Pack". In "Tales of a Third Grade Nothing", Frank and Brian purchase the Quahog Cabana Club. When business fails to improve, the two look to Stewie to bring in more customers. Stewie turns the club into a trendy Hollywood-style night club called pLace that ultimately fails when Andy Dick shows up to party. The episode "Bookie of the Year" was posthumously Frank Sinatra Jr.'s final role, where he helps Brian and Stewie with a restaurant plan. The episode is dedicated to him.
- God (voiced by Seth MacFarlane) is the father of Jesus Christ and the creator of life. He is a central part of the basic tenets in the religion of Christianity. Although the basic concept of God exists in other monotheistic and polytheistic religions, it is the Christian God that serves as the basis for the character in Family Guy. His appearance in the show is the stereotypical appearance of an Abrahamic god in the Western world: a bald Caucasian man with long white hair, a huge white beard and a white robe. Contrary to the widespread belief of a benevolent and pure God, the God character in Family Guy often displays several human flaws, especially being socially irresponsible and sexually perverted. In the episode "Fifteen Minutes of Shame", he aims a sniper rifle with red dot sight at Meg from the clouds after she says, "Oh God, kill me now", but is interrupted by a phone call. In the episode "Blind Ambition", God flirts with a woman at the Drunken Clam, and lights her a cigarette with lightning before accidentally vaporizing her and setting the bar on fire, to which he exclaims, "Jesus Christ!" Jesus then arrives, and hastily leaves the area with God in a Cadillac Escalade before they can be caught up in the blaze. In "Untitled Griffin Family History", God asks his roommate Chuggs for a lighter, using it to light a fart. On his second attempt, the lit fart sets in motion the Big Bang that creates the universe. In "The Courtship of Stewie's Father", Joseph quarrels with a teenage Jesus, before Jesus storms out of the room shouting, "You're not my real father!". He then goes on to give God a phone call asking if he can go back to live with him in Heaven, but is rejected. God then turns to a young woman named Janet lying in his bed, hoping to have sex with her. Janet hands him a condom to his disappointment, and asks her to reconsider, saying it is his birthday, but Janet refuses. In "Partial Terms of Endearment", Peter thanks God thinking he is set to participate in a threesome with Lois and her friend Naomi, to which God replies "Don't mention it, Peter". A jingle is then heard singing, "God! He knows what turns you on!", after which God says, "Have fun!" In "Into Fat Air", God and Jesus discuss how to name a country in the Himalayas. God says that the mountains look like nipples, to which Jesus replies that he cannot call a country "Nipples". In response, God suggests the name Nepal, to Jesus' approval. In "Faith No More", Brian and Stewie try to go back in time to the Biblical times to prevent Christianity where Brian has Jesus persuade God to let him to do stand-up comedy. When Stewie uses the time machine to prevent Judaism, God visits the Griffin family house disguised as a delivery man where he beats them up for his actions. When Brian is reluctant to undo his and Stewie's actions, God angrily descends upon them as the final scene shows an injured Brian and Stewie singing hymns at church. Other episodes show God's serious side on occasion, such as in "If I'm Dyin', I'm Lyin'", where he curses Peter with six of the 10 plagues after he lied to the people of Quahog about being a healer and is then worshipped as a god.
- Horace (voiced by Johnny Brennan) is the proprietor and bartender of The Drunken Clam for 30 years. He has been working there for at least as long as Peter and his friends have been regulars. Horace has been shot a handful of times, but has recovered from each incident. In "One If by Clam, Two If by Sea", Horace sold The Drunken Clam following a storm and moved to Florida. He later repurchased it after moving back to Quahog. In "Blind Ambition", Horace's life is saved by Peter (who was blind at the time) when The Drunken Clam was on fire. In "Save the Clam", Horace is accidentally killed when a baseball hit by Jerome hits him during a baseball game between The Drunken Clam and Mort's Pharmacy. His death causes the bank to close The Drunken Clam, which causes Peter, Joe and Quagmire to protest this until Jerome buys The Drunken Clam to keep Horace's legacy alive.
- Jake Tucker (voiced by Seth MacFarlane) is Tom Tucker's deformed son and Chris' former classmate. Jake's many appearances show him with an "upside-down face": a mouth near the top of his head and eyes near the bottom. In "It Takes a Village Idiot, and I Married One", he gets a normal face, via toxic waste. Although typically depicted as a demanding and obnoxious brat, Jake craves his father's attention, which he rarely gets. "Peter Griffin: Husband, Father...Brother?" reveals that he "doesn't have a bottom". Though Tom often neglects him, he often shows that he cares, such as when Brian accused Jake of giving Chris alcohol. However, when Chris gets back at Jake by planting drugs in his locker, an enraged Tom declares him a "bad boy" and loses faith in him. In "Mother Tucker", Jake is noticeably neglected by Tom when Tom pays more attention to Peter. But Peter then realizes that Tom should pay more attention to Jake.
- James Woods (voiced by himself) is a 58-year-old actor whose fictional persona becomes a criminal sociopath. In "Peter's Got Woods", he is invited by Peter to help deal with the local high school being named for Woods, i.e. James Woods Regional High School. While Brian's attentions are turned to his girlfriend, Peter becomes friends with Woods. This friendship ends when Woods becomes jealous of Brian. Peter and Brian manage to trap Woods inside a crate (using Reese's Pieces as bait), and ship him off to be studied by "top men". Woods returns in "Back to the Woods", stealing Peter's wallet and assuming his identity. Peter retaliates by assuming Woods' identity and ruining his reputation on the Late Show with David Letterman by announcing a comedy film about the September 11th attacks, resulting in massive backlash from the public. When Woods shows up to fight Peter, he is again thwarted when Peter and Brian trap him inside a crate exactly as they had done before. In "Something, Something, Something, Dark Side", Woods makes an appearance as General Maximilian Veers. In "Brian Griffin's House of Payne", the CBS producers hire Woods to star in Brian Griffin's television show, Woods making multiple changes to Brian's original script that prompt Brian to back out of the project. James Woods reappears in "And Then There Were Fewer", in which he becomes a born-again Christian due to his new relationship with a young news intern named Priscilla. Woods turns his life over to Jesus wishing to make amends for his sins. Woods is later killed as part of an elaborate murder plot orchestrated by Diane Simmons. "Tom Tucker: The Man and His Dream" reveals that the paramedics who loaded Woods' body into the ambulance recognized him and had his body rushed to a special Hollywood hospital where a teenage girl's life force was drained into Woods, which resurrected him. He is still a born-again Christian when he encounters Peter Griffin and Tom Tucker in Hollywood. In "The Simpsons Guy", James Woods was in Springfield at the trial between Duff Beer and Pawtucket Patriot Ale. During this time, he interacted with his Simpsons counterpart from "Homer and Apu". The episode "Inside Family Guy" had James Woods hosting the behind-the-scenes theme of the episode.
- Jeffrey (voiced by Mike Henry) is Bruce's boyfriend and was initially an offscreen character before making his first official appearance in "Underage Peter". In "Meg's Wedding", he and Bruce finally get married. However, he's killed by a shark in "The Fat Lotus".
- Jerome (voiced by Kevin Michael Richardson) is a 42-year-old African-American man, who first appeared in "Jerome is the New Black", in which he won the audition as a temporary replacement for Cleveland. It is revealed he was involved with Lois Griffin in their younger days before she met Peter, which made Peter jealous enough to burn down Jerome's house, so Lois invited him to come live with them. Peter believed that Jerome was trying to steal Lois from him and became jealous. He kicked Jerome out of his house, but later apologized to him and they remained friends. Jerome also tells Peter that he had some "nasty-ass sex" with Meg when he was staying with the Griffins, but Peter told him that he does not care about that. He returns in "Save the Clam", playing for Mort Goldman's softball team against Peter and his team from The Drunken Clam. He accidentally kills Horace by swinging the ball towards his face. Jerome appears at the funeral, where he apologizes for accidentally killing Horace. When it came to the demolition of The Drunken Clam which Peter, Quagmire, and Joe were protesting, Jerome appears and uses his sports earnings from lacrosse (which also happens to be his brother's name) to buy The Drunken Clam in order to keep Horace's legacy alive. "Baby Got Black" reveals that Jerome has a daughter named Pam and at first disapproved of her relationship with Chris. In "Follow the Money", Jerome reveals that he lost both his childhood sweetheart and their daughter shortly after their wedding. "Pawtucket Pete" reveals that Jerome's voice is unaffected by helium, as seen when Peter fired a harpoon gun at Brian Griffin's parade balloon.
- Jesus Christ (voiced by Seth MacFarlane in early episodes, David Goodman in "Stu and Stewie's Excellent Adventure", Seth Green in "The Courtship of Stewie's Father", Alec Sulkin in later episodes) is the central figure of Christianity. Throughout the series, a running gag has been that Jesus drives a Cadillac Escalade. This is first seen in the episode "Blind Ambition", in which he uses it to pick up God from the Drunken Clam after He accidentally set the bar on fire. In "North by North Quahog", he is in the car in a trailer for the action film The Passion of the Christ 2: Crucify This starring Jim Caviezel as Jesus and Chris Tucker, and directed by Mel Gibson. Jesus Christ's most prominent appearance on the show came in the episode "I Dream of Jesus", where he worked in disguise at a vinyl record store called "Dead Format Records" before being recognized by Peter. After a public display of his powers, including walking on water, he becomes a huge celebrity in Quahog. While having dinner with the Griffins, Jesus proves to Brian that he actually is Jesus Christ by turning their dinners into ice cream sundaes, before immensely enlarging Lois' breasts at Peter's request, to the absolute shock of Brian. As the episode progresses, Jesus lets fame get to his head more and more while becoming more distant from Peter and his family, and ultimately gets himself incarcerated for drug abuse. When Peter visits him in prison, Jesus apologizes for his actions and decides that he probably was not mature enough to return to the world. He then gives Peter another record of "Surfin' Bird" as a gift after the first one he had was destroyed by Brian and Stewie. In "Chitty Chitty Death Bang", he turned water into funk. In the episode "Holy Crap", Francis repeatedly gives Jesus the employee of the week award, and is himself later seen in a golf course going for a fourth birdie. Upon missing his putt, he uses his power to move the ball into the hole. In the episode "And the Wiener is...", Jesus and Moses use guns to defeat the Romans in a film by the National Gun Association. In the episode "Deep Throats", Lois asks "What if Jesus had given up?", after which Jesus is seen in a shabby-looking house sitting lazily in a chair, with several children running around him, and calls out to their mother asking why their ironing board is still out. In "Stu and Stewie's Excellent Adventure", the adult Stewie tells his infant self of a time when he went back in time on vacation to see Jesus, saying that his abilities may have been exaggerated a bit. A cutaway shows adult Stewie and other members of the public watching Jesus perform Art Metrano's "tricks" while humming the song "Fine and Dandy". In "Boys Do Cry", Stewie imagines what it would be like meeting Jesus, and in a cutaway enters a room in Jesus' house to find him naked washing himself in a tub. Despite noticing Stewie, he carries on. In "Jerome is the New Black", he has an African-American counterpart in "Black Jesus", who is portrayed as a cool laid-back character wearing sunglasses. In "Go, Stewie, Go", he is in a dodgeball game on the side of the jocks pelting numerous balls at the nerds. In "Life of Brian", Stewie is at the Last Supper suggesting the idea of rebellion to Judas Iscariot, pointing out that Jesus ordered five margaritas while all Judas had was the salad. In other episodes, Jesus has been portrayed as a voice of reason, such as in "Family Goy", where he tells Peter about his Jewish identity after Peter and Lois quarreled over whether their family should be Christian or Jewish. However, in response to Peter's question asking which religion his family should follow, Jesus says "6 of 1, they're all complete crap". In "3 Acts of God", Jesus is dating Carrie Underwood. In "The 2000-Year-Old Virgin", Jesus has broken up with Carrie Underwood.
- Jillian Russell-Wilcox (voiced by Drew Barrymore) is Brian's cute, bulimic, and dimwitted 26-year-old girlfriend who is portrayed as a stereotypical blonde. She is quite ignorant; for example, she does not understand that Adolf Hitler died decades ago. She has a close friendship with Peter, who treats her more like a daughter than he does Meg, due to their similar levels of intelligence. The remainder of the Griffin family look on her as a figure of mockery and symbol of Brian's shallowness, although she has affection for them, involving them all in her wedding. She first appeared in "Whistle While Your Wife Works". She is the only girlfriend that Brian has dated for more than one episode, and was a recurring character in season 5. He stays with her purely for sex, though after they split, he felt strong feelings of love for her. In "Prick Up Your Ears", when Brian talks about Jillian's bulimia, he goes on to compare her to Karen from The Carpenters, who succumbed to anorexia in 1983, claiming she "overdid it" but he thinks "Jillian's found a good balance". She breaks up with Brian in "Movin' Out" when it is revealed that Brian did not want a committed relationship with her, and she briefly dated Mayor Adam West. She got married in the episode "We Love You, Conrad". In "And Then There Were Fewer", her husband Derek Wilcox was murdered by Diane Simmons, making Jillian a widow. She is dating again in "Tiegs for Two", where Quagmire attempts to date her to make Brian jealous, but she and Cheryl Tiegs leave together when they realize how immature both men are acting. In "Valentine's Day in Quahog", Jillian is among the ex-girlfriends of Brian that Stewie assembles.
- Jim Kaplan (voiced by Danny Smith) is a con man who tricks Peter into spending money on various useless things on many occasions. He was first introduced as Doug but has been referred to as Jim in later episodes. First appearing in "There's Something About Paulie", he sells a car to Peter that does not have an engine under the hood but rather a picture of one by claiming that the car belonged to James Bond. He later sells Peter volcano insurance in "When You Wish Upon a Weinstein", for which Peter paid with Lois' rainy-day money (which she planned to use after Stewie broke Meg's glasses). With help from the accountant Max Weinstein, Peter reclaimed the money. Jim later sells Peter a TiVo in "Bango Was His Name Oh!" In "A Fish out of Water", he gives Peter a loan for Peter's new fishing boat and Peter offers up his house as collateral, which later gets taken over by the bank and sold to a fashionable, artsy, neo-hippie-ish new couple named Jim and Abby. In "Hell Comes to Quahog", he sells Peter a tank for Meg at a car dealership for her first car and finally convinces him by saying "Did I mention it's a tank?"
- Judge Dignified Q. Blackman (voiced by Phil LaMarr) is the African-American judge who presides over trials involving any of this show's characters. His full name was revealed by the bailiff in "Veteran Guy" when Peter, Cleveland, and Joe were on trial for violating the Stolen Valor Act of 2013.
- Lou Spinazola (voiced by Ralph Garman) is the building manager of the seedy apartment building that Brian Griffin resides in from "The D in Apartment 23" to "Crimes and Meg's Demeanor". Lou's one rule in his apartment building is to never kiss the mail carrier. In "Married... with Cancer", Lou allows Brian and his terminal cancer-recovered wife Jess Schlotz to move in while having developed a sitcom catchphrase.
- Olivia Fuller (voiced by Rachael MacFarlane) is a child actress and local Quahog celebrity. She debuts in "From Method to Madness" when Stewie attends the same theatre school as her, and while they do perform together at first, they eventually become rivals. She moves away prior to the episode "Chick Cancer" but returns to Quahog as her career wanes. Stewie goes to the Quahog Mall, where she is scheduled to appear, intent on humiliating her, but instead ends up falling in love with her. With advice from Brian, Stewie attempts to woo her until she gives in to his efforts, and the two of them get "married". Unfortunately, their past rivalry and Stewie's jealousy of Olivia's success hinders their relationship, leading to Olivia "cheating" on Stewie with her old friend Victor. In retaliation, Stewie burns down their cardboard house with Olivia and Victor inside. She returns alive and well in "The Boys in the Band"; after once again running into Stewie, who is now performing with Brian as a children's music duo named Red Shirt, Blue Shirt, Olivia tricks them into breaking up, and takes Stewie's place as Red Shirt. However, Brian quits performing with Olivia during a concert, after seeing Stewie in the front row of the audience crying while they play one of Stewie's original songs. Unfazed, she replaces Brian with another dog, who turns out to be Vinny.
- Paddy Tanniger (voiced by Seth MacFarlane) is a short red-haired angry man who has been a caddy manager and a Hummer salesman. He generally ends his statements with "Big whoop, wanna fight about it?" He was eventually killed when he was run over by a tank piloted by Brian and Stewie in "Hell Comes to Quahog". The DVD commentary for "The Perfect Castaway" mentions that nearly all the writing staff disliked the character, which led to his death.
- Rupert (voiced by David Boat in "Stewie Loves Lois", "Stewie Kills Lois, "Lois Kills Stewie", and "Road to the North Pole", Derek Jacobi in "Peter, Peter, Pumpkin Cheater") is a stuffed teddy bear that belongs to one-year-old Stewie Griffin. Though inanimate, Rupert has become his personal confidant and best friend. Stewie confides all his secrets and machinations in Rupert, and often gets upset when Rupert does not respond. Rupert has been known to double as a pistol when needed ("Peter, Peter, Caviar Eater"). Rupert has been damaged several times. The first time, in a flashback in "Stu & Stewie's Excellent Adventure", Stewie argued with Brian about the economy and Brian ate one of Rupert's legs. Stewie got the leg back after a while. The second time involved encountering an unfamiliar Rottweiler dog in "Stewie Loves Lois". Rupert was torn to shreds but was later sewn back together by Lois. In "A Very Special Family Guy Freakin' Christmas", Stewie tears Rupert in two, after waking up from a Santa Claus–themed nightmare. In "Killer Queen", Stewie shoots Rupert in the head with a gun rather than risk letting him die a worse death when he sees the cover of a Queen album. In "The Man with Two Brians", he is humped by New Brian for two hours. Stewie then drags a body into the garbage, later revealed to be New Brian. At the end of the episode Stewie is crying in the shower and washing Rupert in despair, constantly reassuring him that it was not his fault. In "Chick Cancer", when Stewie married Olivia Fuller, he had Rupert officiate the ceremony. "8 Simple Rules for Buying My Teenage Daughter" had the creation of Stewpert, a being where Stewie and Rupert were fused together after Stewie activated his teleportation device before he realized Rupert was inside, in reference to Brundlefly of The Fly. Stewie had several times referred to him as gay. Stewie accused Rupert of choosing to watch the boys in "Road to Rhode Island" as opposed to watching their bags as Stewie has told him to, much to Stewie's chagrin. In the episode "Road to Rupert", Brian accidentally sells Rupert, causing both Brian and Stewie (after Brian confesses to selling Rupert by accident) to head to the Swiss Alps to retrieve him from the family that he was sold to, eventually challenging the father of the family to a ski race to either get him back or give the family Brian as the stakes. Stewie does not respect the rules and throws hot tea in the other young boy's eyes, blinding him long enough to grab Rupert, but Stewie later says that he was through with Rupert and was too old for him, saying "...after all, Brian, I'm nearly one." Stewie has also imagined Rupert as a muscular, human male a few times, including in "Road to the North Pole", where he builds a buff Rupert snowman in the opening credit sequence. However, Rupert retains his Teddy Bear head. In a DVD-exclusive scene in "Excellence in Broadcasting", Stewie explores the experience of fantasizing and in his fantasy buff Rupert makes out with an equally buff Brian while Stewie is tied to the bed. In the episode "Lois Comes Out of Her Shell", Rupert's head is ripped off by Stewie's evil pet turtle Sheldon, who Stewie fights with in return. In "Total Recall", the factory that made Rupert demands all bears be returned to them, as they were a choking hazard. Lois sends him back, and Brian and Stewie go on a life-threatening quest to get him back, only just saving Rupert (and Stewie) from death in a furnace. As they return home, Stewie celebrates with Rupert, only for Rupert's eye to come off and Stewie to swallow it, supposedly killing him, with Chris, who witnessed the scene, casually shouting, "Mom, Stewie's dead". In the episode "Quagmire's Quagmire", Stewie must decide whether to "play" with Rupert anymore after Lois finds his newborn plush toy, a blue, scruffy-looking, bow-tied teddy bear named Oscar who was apparently given to him by Babs Pewterschmidt (his maternal grandmother) when Stewie was born. This fact is stated by Meg, who is in the attic, organizing items from boxes along with Lois. Stewie treats Rupert like a nagging wife juxtaposed to Oscar's imaginary role as the still-loved ex-girlfriend. In "The Simpsons Guy", Stewie is holding Rupert in court, while sitting next to Mr. Burns, holding his own teddy bear, Bobo. In "Stewie, Chris & Brian's Excellent Adventure", Rupert tells the other stuffed animals that he is straight after Stewie and Brian leave with Chris in the time machine. In "Dog Bites Bear", Brian accidentally destroys Rupert while drunk. He later replaces him with an identical-looking bear that Stewie believes to be Rupert having returned from the dead. In the season 19 episode "The Talented Mr. Stewie" Stewie "breaks up" with Rupert after having found out he belonged to Chris before Stewie was born. Stewie then returns Rupert to Chris and in trying to fill the void starts playing with different stuffed animals, but to no avail. Eventually Stewie is driven by jealousy to kill Chris and Rupert. After realizing Chris planned on returning Rupert, Stewie saves a drowning Chris and reconciles with Rupert.
- Seamus Levine (voiced by Seth MacFarlane) is a tough fisherman who is in his 60s and has two peg-legs as well as two peg arms. He wears a black eye patch over his right eye. He first appears in the episode "A Fish Out of Water". While spending time with Peter and the gang in a steam room, it is revealed his whole body from the neck down is wood. He tends to warn Peter of danger. Seamus had his own talk show in "Perfect Castaway". In his premiere episode, he jokes that his father was a tree, but in the episode "And Then There Were Fewer" he blames his condition on James Woods. Seamus initially claims that Woods carved him from wood and did not wish hard enough for him to be a real boy, but he later revealed that they both got high on acid one day and Woods ate off Seamus' arms and legs, thinking that he was a steak. In "Ocean's Three and a Half", when Seamus is seen naked, his body is entirely wooden while his head is human. He played Byron Hadley in the series' portrayal of The Shawshank Redemption, the second of the "Three Kings". In a DVD-exclusive scene, Seamus tries out for Fox News Channel in "FOX-y Lady". He gets a ship in a bottle for Christmas in "Road to the North Pole". In "Tiegs for Two", he attends Quagmire's class on how to pick up women. In "Cool Hand Peter", Seamus attempts to join in Peter, Joe, Cleveland, and Quagmire's road trip only to be rejected by Peter. In "The Simpsons Guy", Seamus attended the trial in Springfield between Duff Beer and Pawtucket Patriot Ale, where he was sitting next to Captain Horatio McCallister. In "Christmas Is Coming" his son Woody was introduced; he also has two peg-legs and two peg arms.
- Miss Tammy (voiced by Rachael MacFarlane) is Stewie's teacher at Quahog Preschool.
- Vinny Fuller (voiced by Tony Sirico) is a 5-year-old talking Italian Greyhound whose first appearance in the franchise occurs in "Life of Brian". After Brian is killed in a tragic car accident, the Griffin family decides to find another dog at the pet store to ease their grief. They meet Vinny, a pussyhound (he is 1/16th cat) of Italian descent. Each member of the family (save Stewie) is taken with Vinny, and he is adopted into their family. Stewie, still mourning the death of Brian, rebuffs the hound and makes several attempts to get him out of the family. However, once Stewie learns that Vinny had also undergone a period of mourning when his owner died in a freak yoga accident, he comes to accept the hound as part of the family. Like Brian, Vinny is an anthropomorphized dog where he is described as being a "pooch with attitude", and according to executive producer Steve Callaghan, "Vinny is just a lot more rough around the edges" and "is a really good match for Stewie." His personality is that of a streetwise, "wise guy" Italian American. In "Christmas Guy", Vinny, upon asking around, finds out that Carter Pewterschmidt canceled an event at Quahog Mall, and reports this to the Griffin family. Vinny helps Stewie distract his past self so he can steal the return pad from his backpack and travel back in time to save Brian. Before Stewie goes back in time, he says his goodbyes to Vinny. Just before Stewie travels back in time, Vinny walks off shouting "Georgette, I'm coming home!", at which Stewie questions who "Georgette" is. At the end of "The Boys in the Band", after Brian quits performing with Olivia Fuller as Red Shirt, Blue Shirt, she replaces him with another dog, who, according to Brian, is "probably a dog neither [Stewie] or [he] has ever met"; it is then revealed that Vinny was chosen.

=== Stoolbend residents ===
- Coach Charles McFall (voiced by Mike Henry) worked as a baseball coach during Cleveland's high school days at Stoolbend High School. When Cleveland wanted to start up the Waterman Yards again, Cleveland found Coach McFall working as a janitor at the Broken Stool while missing his left cheek due to his chewing of tobacco over the years.
- Gus (voiced by David Lynch) is the 117-year-old bartender at the Broken Stool, before which he studied drama at Northwestern University. Gus seems to be on good terms with Cleveland and his friends, giving them their drinks for free.
- Larry is Cleveland Jr.'s stuffed toy leopard.
- Meadowlark Lemon was the Tubbs' former family dog. In the second episode of season one, Cleveland accidentally kills him by running over him with his car several times. His body was later eaten by Lester and his family.
- Murray (voiced by Carl Reiner) is a Jewish senior citizen who Rallo meets at the retirement home around Christmas time. He teaches Rallo about the Jewish holiday of Hanukkah. In the episode "Sex and the Biddy" he has a girlfriend named Hazel, but does not know until after he marries her that she is a gold digger. Near the end of the episode, Murray and Rallo get revenge on Hazel by filling her apartment with cats to make her seem that she lost her mind and being forced to go to a mental institution.
- Angus (voiced by Alec Sulkin) is a radio show host and occasional sports commentator and one of Cleveland's high school friends.
  - Gordy (voiced by John Viener) is a radio announcer who is the co-host and best friend of Angus and one of Cleveland's high school friends.
- Dr. Fist (voiced by Seth MacFarlane in seasons 1–2, Tom Kenny in season 3, Bryan Cranston in season 4) is a doctor that works at Stoolbend's hospital. Due to Seth MacFarlane working on the film Ted, Tom Kenny had to cover for Seth by voicing Dr. Fist starting with "Skip Day".
- Donny (voiced by Danny Smith) is formerly a leisure-suit-wearing patron of the Broken Stool and a former acquaintance of Cleveland's. Donny was first in "How Cleveland Got His Groove Back", when Cleveland temporarily sought a new circle of friends. He later tried to murder Cleveland and kept Cleveland Jr. and Donna hostage to lure Cleveland into a trap.
- Dwayne Meighan (voiced by Mike Henry) is the local television newscaster of Stoolbend.
- Fern Stapleton (voiced by Kristen Wiig in the first appearance, Beth Littleford in later appearances) is the mother of Lacey Stapleton and Kyle Stapleton.
- Mike (voiced by Brandon Richardson) is the band member leader who help Cleveland Brown and Kenny West find his street cred.
- Mayor Larry Box (voiced by John Slattery) is the Mayor of Stoolbend, who is casually profane.
- Mr. Flippers (voiced by Mike Henry) is a magical flying walrus that would save the characters during the "Scene Missing" parts.
- Reverend Jenkins (voiced by Kevin Michael Richardson) is a reverend who works at the Stoolbend Community Church. He first appeared in "Gone with the Wind", where he presided over Loretta Brown's funeral.
- Rock Hudson is an upbeat Bichon Frisé who was originally owned by Lloyd Waterman. When Rallo and Cleveland Jr. try to return him for a $5000 reward, Waterman reveals that he hates the dog and gives the boys the reward money to get rid of him.
- Professor Sarah Friedman (voiced by Bebe Neuwirth) is the mother of Gabriel and works as a university professor alongside her husband Saul.
- Professor Saul Friedman (voiced by Jason Alexander) is the father of Gabriel and works as a university professor alongside his wife Sarah. He allows his son to promote his CD at his house. Saul was present at LeVar and Cookie's wedding.
- Yvette (voiced by Rutina Wesley) is Donna Tubbs' best friend. She first appears in the episode "Ladies' Night". She made a second appearance in the episode "Brotherly Love".

=== Gag characters ===
- Al Harrington (voiced by Danny Smith) is the owner, president, and CEO of "Al Harrington's Wacky Waving Inflatable Arm-Flailing Tubeman Emporium and Warehouse".
- Barbershop Quartet (voiced by Jon Joyce, Bob Joyce, Rick Logan, and Randy Crenshaw) are a group of four men that sing close harmony songs in specific episodes.
- Buzz Killington (voiced by Danny Smith) is a man who dresses and acts as if he is a 19th-century British man of means. True to his name, he tends to be a buzzkill during social gatherings and other events.
- Conway Twitty is usually seen in archival footage of his performances, which are used when one of the characters needs a distraction.
- Evil Monkey (voiced by Danny Smith) is a monkey living in Chris' closet. The monkey's trademark grimace and pointing was the idea of writer Mike Barker.
- Ernie the Giant Chicken (voiced by Danny Smith) is an anthropomorphic, human-sized chicken that often fights violently with Peter Griffin, usually interrupting some unrelated event. Their rivalry began after Ernie gave Peter an expired coupon, as shown in a flashback in the episode "Da Boom". He was decapitated by Meg in Season 23's "The Chicken or the Meg"; series showrunner Alec Sulkin clarified that the character had been officially killed off, as the crew could not think of much more to do with him. Despite this, Ernie makes a reappearance in "The Lord of the Earring" segment in Season 24's "Viewer DMs", and appears again later in the season in the episode "A Few More Ways to Die in the West", though neither episode is set within the show's standard continuity.
- Fjurg van der Ploeg (voiced by John Viener) is a Swedish man who owns a bakery, who makes his first official appearance in "Love, Blactually" (although he appears in a deleted scene of the earlier episode "McStroke", as seen on DVD). He speaks in a strong Swedish accent, pronouncing words in humorous ways, such as pronouncing "pie" as "pee", or "dough" as "doo". He is the world champion of a fictional sport known as schpupel; a cutaway shows that Peter once lost to him in a schpupel match.
- The Greased-up Deaf Guy (voiced by Mike Henry) is a naked deaf man covered in grease who speaks in a shrill voice, first appearing in "The Thin White Line". His greased body and deafness were a result of being caught in an oil tank truck explosion.
- Holden Caulfield (voiced by Mark Hentemann and named by the crew after the protagonist of the J.D. Salinger novel The Catcher in the Rye) is a man who obsessively calls out anyone he deems a "phony". He debuts in "The Kiss Seen Around the World", shaming Peter in public for pretending to play a keyboard while using its autoplay feature, going so far as to spray-paint graffiti on Peter's car and standing outside the Griffin house, yelling out to passersby that "a phony lives here!". In the Star Wars episodes, he plays Admiral Ozzel.
- James William Bottomtooth III (voiced by Chris Sheridan) is a character with a severe underbite (Habsburg jaw), which has given him a comically oversized lower jaw and has made his speech impossible to understand due to his extreme Locust Valley lockjaw accent. "You May Now Kiss the... Uh... Guy Who Receives" reveals that he is a religious Christian and opposes same-sex marriage.
- Kool-Aid Man (voiced by Seth MacFarlane) is the mascot for the popular drink Kool-Aid, parodied in several episodes. A running gag sees him breaking through a wall and shouting his catchphrase "Oh, yeah!" after other characters' repeated cries of "Oh, no!"; it gets to the point where Judge Dignified Q. Blackman requests nobody yell "Oh, no!" in the courtroom to keep the Kool-Aid Man from showing up. "Valentine's Day in Quahog" reveals that he has a girlfriend, a sentient bottle of Yoo-hoo who is depicted as a stereotypical African-American woman, much to the shock of his disapproving father.
- Phineas and Barnaby (voiced by Seth MacFarlane and Wally Wingert) are two strongmen that usually pursue two goals: working out at the Quahog Gym and riding penny-farthing bicycles.
- RJ (voiced by Mike Henry) is a man with an overexaggerated, grating Wisconsin accent. His running gag is how he frequently wants to "bone his girlfriend" but due to some circumstance it never happens, as in his first appearance, where he claims to have seen Bigfoot just before he and his girlfriend could begin to have sex.
- Tomik and Bellgarde (voiced by John Viener and Alec Sulkin) are two foreign guys who have "been living in the United States almost long enough to sound American".
- Vern (voiced by Seth MacFarlane) and Johnny are two vaudeville characters who appear in cutaways and are dressed in traditional turn-of-the-century pinstripe outfits. Vern does all the talking (and singing) while Johnny is silent and provides accompanying piano music, usually the song Galloping Gertie, to Vern's acts. According to Seth MacFarlane, viewers quickly got tired of the characters, so they were killed off in "Saving Private Brian": Stewie shoots and kills them both, then turns to the audience and says "Okay, they're dead, all right? We're not gonna be seeing them again." However, they reappear as ghosts in "Back to the Woods", although Johnny is in Hell as Vern states that he was a pedophile.

== See also ==
- List of American Dad! characters
