= Blind Ambition (Family Guy) =

- Family Guy episode
- Episode no.: Season 4 Episode 3
- Directed by: Chuck Klein
- Written by: Steve Callaghan
- Production code: 4ACX04
- Original air date: May 15, 2005

Guest appearances
- Gary Cole as Security Guard; Gina Gershon as Policewoman; Judd Hirsch as himself; Rachael MacFarlane as Cheerleader; Lisa Wilhoit as Beth, Cheerleader

Episode chronology
← Previous "Fast Times at Buddy Cianci Jr. High"	Next → "Don't Make Me Over"
- Family Guy season 4

"Blind Ambition" is the third episode of the fourth season of the American animated sitcom Family Guy. It was first broadcast on Fox in the United States on May 15, 2005. In the episode, Peter swallows an excessive number of nickels, causing him to become blind. He later becomes a hero after unwittingly saving Horace the bartender from a fire at his bar, The Drunken Clam, and then regains his sight. Meanwhile, Quagmire is forced to refrain from perverse sexual behavior or risk being driven out of the neighborhood following his arrest for spying on Lois in a ladies' lavatory.

== Plot ==
At the bowling alley, Mort Goldman bowls a perfect game and becomes an overnight celebrity. Lois arrives to pick Peter up from the bowling alley, but discovers Quagmire spying on her from the ceiling of the ladies' toilet. Quagmire is arrested, but released shortly after by Joe. On his return, Lois, Bonnie and Loretta reveal that they are petitioning the city of Quahog to have Quagmire removed from their neighborhood. As Peter and the other guys are defending Quagmire, Ernie the Giant Chicken ambushes Peter and starts a fight that causes huge casualties inside and outside of Quahog. After the fight, Peter returns to the neighborhood to resume the conversation and continues his argument that Quagmire is a good guy. Eventually, the women relent and let Quagmire stay in the neighborhood so long as he manages to control his perverse behavior or else he would be kicked out.

Quagmire's taught self-control through operant conditioning by Peter and his friends, and is eventually allowed out in public. Soon, however, he is distracted by three cheerleaders playing in a fountain in the shopping mall and panics, running into a CCTV camera operation room monitoring women's changing rooms. Discovering that an attractive blonde lady in a fitting room is having a heart attack, he appears to rush to her aid, performing CPR and saving her life. Quagmire is congratulated for his heroism, but his intention had been to molest the woman while she was unconscious (which he reveals by asking "What the hell is CPR?").

This upsets Peter, who is disappointed to notice that he is the one amongst his friends who hasn't been successful. In the hope of becoming famous, Peter attempts to set a world record for eating the largest number of nickels, but develops nickel poisoning and loses his vision. Attempting to drown his sorrows, Peter visits his local bar, The Drunken Clam, with his guide dog, unaware that the bar is on fire. He ignores his guide dog and enters, accidentally saving the bartender Horace who was trapped under debris, still unaware of the fire. Peter is proclaimed a hero by local newsman Tom Tucker. For his inadvertent bravery, Peter is awarded a medal by the mayor and receives an eye transplant, the replacement eyes coming from a homeless man dragged to death when Peter accidentally tied his guide dog's leash around the man's neck, thinking he was a parking meter. The end of this episode is an unconnected parody of the closing scene from Star Wars Episode IV: A New Hope.

== Production ==
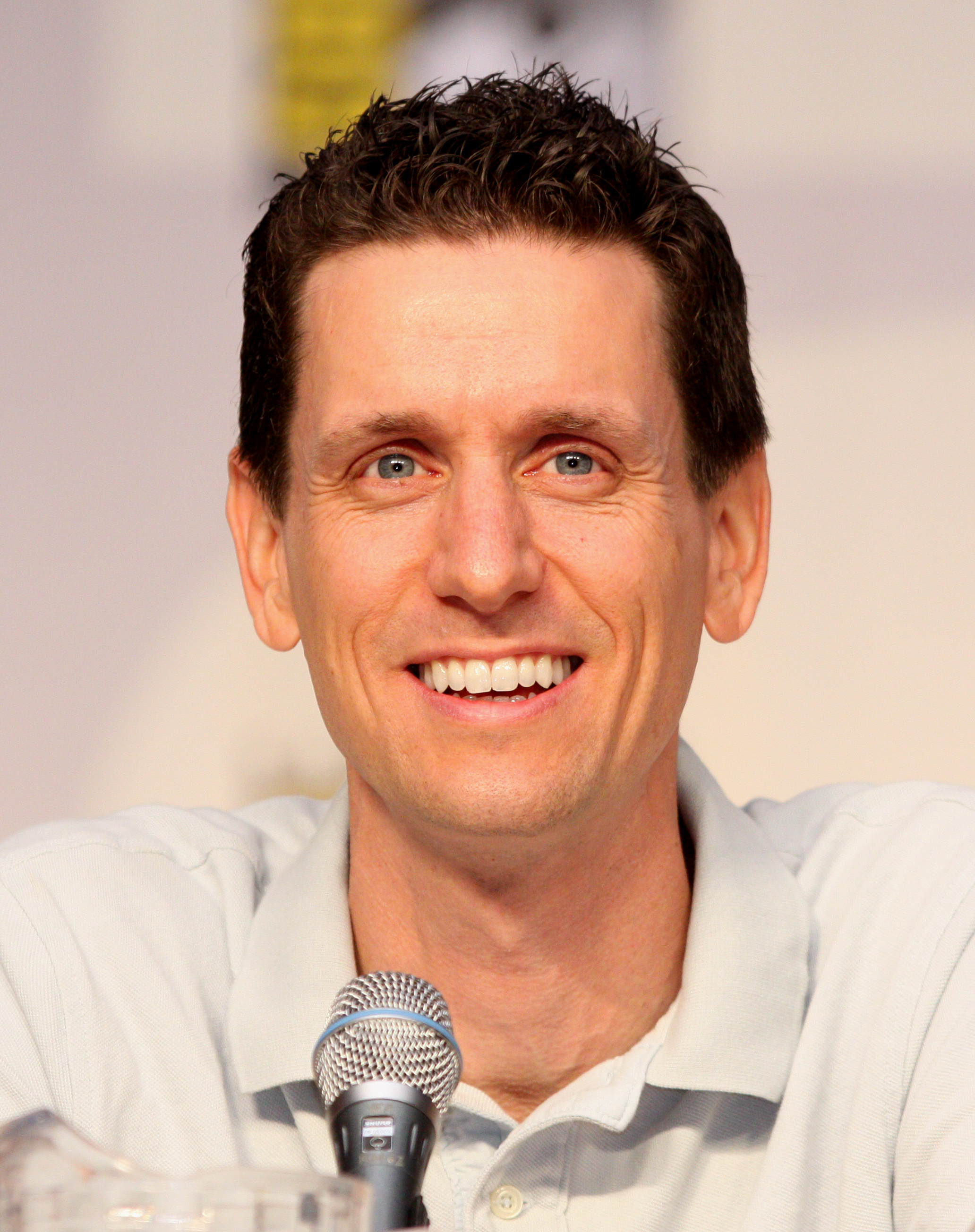
Steve Callaghan wrote the episode.

During Family Guy's third season, the show was cancelled by its network. In preparation in case the show was revived and began broadcasting again, five short scripts were written in 2001 for future episodes. Blind Ambition was developed from one of those scripts. A number of scenes in the episode were removed before broadcast and one, the reappearance of Ernie the Giant Chicken, had originally been set to broadcast in "The Cleveland–Loretta Quagmire". The scene was moved to this episode because "The Cleveland-Loretta Quagmire" already contained a lengthy fight sequence and overran its time allowance. Several of the removed scenes focused on gags showing Peter and his friends attempting to rehabilitate Quagmire, one of which saw Brian Griffin transporting a fork-lift truck load of porn magazines away from Quagmire's house. Since the episode aired, a selection of action figures have been created of Peter acting as Gary, The No Trash Cougar.

Show producer David Goodman received many telephone calls complaining about the scene where Peter attempts to seduce his son Chris, mistakenly believing him to be his wife, Lois. The scene was believed by some viewers to be encouraging child molestation. The show also received at least one letter of complaint regarding the scene where Quagmire watches Lois going to the toilet; screenwriter Chris Sheridan comments on the DVD commentary that the number of complaints about this scene exceeded one. It is prohibited on Fox to use the term 'Jesus Christ' without actually referring to the person himself, and so in the scene in which God vaporises a person and exclaims "Jesus Christ", it was necessary for Jesus to physically appear before the two run away in order for the scene to be suitable for television airing.

In addition to the regular cast, actor Gary Cole, actress Gina Gershon, actor Judd Hirsch, voice actress Rachael MacFarlane and actress Lisa Wilhoit guest starred in the episode. Recurring guest voice actors Lori Alan, actor John G. Brennan, writer Danny Smith, and actress Jennifer Tilly made minor appearances.

== Cultural references ==
- Stewie discovers the Keebler Elves after crashing into the tree, who plan to kill their competition: Snap, Crackle and Pop, with the help of Judd Hirsch's nuclear weapon, which Peter views while peeking through a ball return at the bowling alley. Later on in the bar, Crackle and Pop are seen discussing an attack by the Keebler Elves which apparently resulted in Snap's death.
- Beforehand, a ship crashes through Quahog buildings, a reference to Speed 2: Cruise Control.
- In one cutaway scene, W. Frederick Gerhardt's Cycleplane crashing is parodied.
- Peter discusses Scrubs with Horace in the bar, a show for which both Neil Goldman and Garrett Donovan have written.
- In another cutaway scene, Peter recalls living at Superman's Fortress of Solitude with Superman, Wonder Woman, Batman and Aquaman, being annoyed that they have run out of Mr. PiBB and Cheez-Its.
- The entire scene in which Peter receives his award from Mayor West is a reenactment of the ending of the original 1977 Star Wars film, A New Hope; Lucasfilm permitted the reproduction of the characters, music and sounds.
- The airplane that defeats Ernie the Giant Chicken in the fight is a mirror reference to the climactic scene in Raiders of the Lost Ark.
- Stewie being launched into a tree is a reference to The Brady Bunch.
- In the scene where the Griffins are in the car and Peter tells them he is setting a world record, he points out two guys morbidly obese guys riding motorbikes nearby. This is a reference to real life pro wrestlers, Billy and Benny McCrary, known professionally as The McGuire Twins, who legitimately hold the Guinness World Record for heaviest twins, weighing in at 723 and 745 pounds respectively, or 1,468 pounds combined.

== Reception ==
PopMatters' Kevin Wong gave the episode a positive review, feeling it was better than the two previous episodes of the season. He commented on the fight scene between Peter and Ernie the Giant Chicken as "a cartoon action sequence to end all cartoon action sequences: vehicles explode and limbs flail as Peter and the chicken beat each other senseless." "Blind Ambition" was criticized by Mike Drucker of IGN, who found that "the long fight with the chicken in Blind Ambition was funny once before, but borderline tiring here". However, Drucker also noted that the Star Wars ending was "one of my favorite jokes in the series".
