= Ocean's Three and a Half =

- Family Guy episode
- Episode no.: Season 7 Episode 7
- Directed by: John Holmquist
- Written by: Cherry Chevapravatdumrong
- Production code: 6ACX11
- Original air date: February 15, 2009

Guest appearances
- James Burkholder as child; Max Burkholder as child; Don LaFontaine as himself; J. P. Manoux as Alan Harper; Chris Parson; Cynthia Watros; Frank Welker as Megatron; Christian Bale as himself (archive voice, uncredited)

Episode chronology
← Previous "Tales of a Third Grade Nothing"	Next → "Family Gay"
- Family Guy season 7

"Ocean's Three and a Half" is the seventh episode of the seventh season of the animated television series Family Guy. It first aired in the United States on the Fox network on February 15, 2009. In the episode, Peter decides to induce his friend Joe Swanson's wife Bonnie into labor so that Joe will be able to spend more time with him. Bonnie gives birth to a baby girl named Susie, but Joe then has trouble with medical bills. Peter, Joe, Cleveland and Quagmire decide to rob Peter's father-in-law, Carter Pewterschmidt. Peter's wife and Pewterschmidt's daughter, Lois, convinces Joe to stop. Lois gets the money from Pewterschmidt by telling him she needs the money for a divorce lawyer. A subplot involves Stewie, who becomes infatuated with Bonnie's daughter Susie.

The title is a spoof of the 1960 heist film Ocean's 11, as well as its reboot film series.

== Plot ==
Frustrated that Joe is growing more concerned that Bonnie is due to give birth within days, Peter attempts to induce labor so Joe will spend more time with him, Cleveland and Quagmire. Peter plays Two and a Half Men near Bonnie, hoping that the baby will come out to change the channel. When Bonnie finally gives birth to her baby, a girl named Susie, Joe is unable to pay the $20,000 he needs for her medical bills. He turns to a loan shark for the money, but ends up in debt to him. Peter and his friends turn to Carter for the money to pay off the loan shark, but Carter refuses as he thinks it would be funnier. In one final act of desperation, Peter decides they should rob Carter. Once they reach the vault, however, Lois arrives on the scene and convinces Joe to stop.

Meanwhile, Stewie falls in love with Susie and attempts to win her over by writing songs specifically for her. This culminates in making a detailed music video featuring Stewie singing a direct version of Bryan Adams' song "(Everything I Do) I Do It for You".

The episode concludes with the Griffins' eating dinner; Stewie states to Brian that he is over his crush on Susie and now has an interest in Adams himself, and Lois explains to Peter that she talked Carter into providing the money, telling him she was using it for a divorce lawyer. When Peter asks her if she is joking, Lois says nothing, leaving Peter somewhat worried.

== Cultural references ==
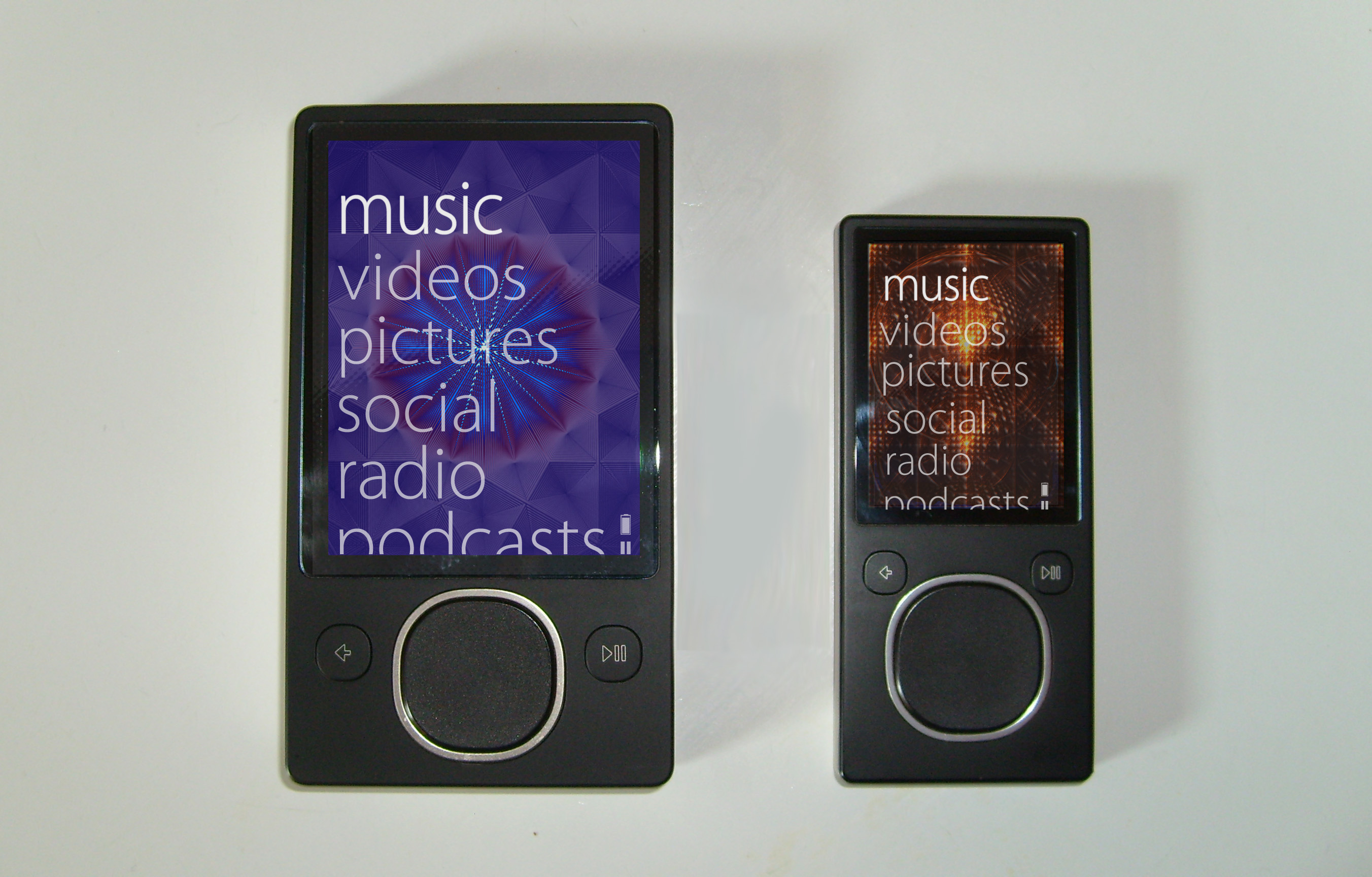
Carter mocks Microsoft's Zune MP3 player

Peter calls Christian Bale "that jerk" after encountering him on the set of Terminator Salvation, with a non-sequitur showing a tape machine playing the actual audio with Peter's voice mixed in for comedic effect. The audio includes about two minutes of an actual outburst Bale made on the set of the film, with Peter's comments interspersed throughout. "You are gonna owe a fortune to the swear jar", Peter says in response to the multiple curses from Bale. He also tells Bale: "I don't get why we need another Terminator." This scene however, was dropped from all subsequent broadcasts of the episode and was never included on the DVD release or any online streaming services, although Netflix's print kept it intact until it was replaced with a newer print. Hulu currently preserves this scene.

The episode also includes a jab at Microsoft's Zune, an MP3 player and a major competitor of the Apple iPod. Carter Pewterschmidt makes fun of Bill Gates, saying Gates actually owns an iPod rather than a Zune, "like the rest of the world".

== Reception ==
The episode received a Nielsen rating of 3.8 among viewers 18–49, in second place behind ABC's Desperate Housewives for the night. Family Guy was among the top 20 shows for the week in the 18–49 demographic, and ranked sixth among the top 17 shows on the Fox Network for the week. Ahsan Haque of IGN commented that the Bale spoof "ranks right up there with some of the best timely pop-culture references in the series". Haque concluded, "It's been a while since we've had new episodes, but it certainly feels like it's been worth the wait as 'Ocean's Three and a Half' turns out to be a triumphant return to form for the series."

Steve Heisler of The A.V. Club called the episode "fine", and graded it B−. He wrote that the Bale spoof and Stewie's music video were "funny for a while" but went on "way too long". Geoff Boucher of the Los Angeles Times wrote positively of the Bale parody, commenting, "Oh, could there possibly be a single iota of humor left in the Christian Bale on-set rant? Why yes, yes there is, thanks to Seth McFarlane and company at Family Guy." Jackie Strause of the New York Post called the exchange between Peter Griffin and Bale "typical Family Guy fashion. In commenting on the Bale spoof, Ben Child of The Guardian wrote: "Personally, I tend to find Family Guy a bit hit and miss, but the US comedy's rather facile flashback formula does at least make it easy to chuck in the topical references."
