= Pilot (The Cleveland Show) =

- The Cleveland Show episode
- Episode no.: Season 1 Episode 1
- Directed by: Anthony Lioi
- Written by: Seth MacFarlane; Mike Henry; Richard Appel
- Production code: 1APS01
- Original air date: September 27, 2009

Guest appearances
- Alex Borstein as Lois Griffin; Stacy Ferguson as Holt's mother; Seth Green as Chris Griffin; Mila Kunis as Meg Griffin; Jennifer Tilly as Bonnie Swanson; Patrick Warburton as Joe Swanson; Seth MacFarlane as Peter Griffin, Brian Griffin, Stewie Griffin and Glenn Quagmire

Episode chronology
| ← Previous — | Next → "Da Doggone Daddy-Daughter Dinner Dance" |
- The Cleveland Show season 1

"Pilot" is the pilot episode and the first episode of the first season of the American animated comedy series The Cleveland Show. Directed by Anthony Lioi and written by series creators Seth MacFarlane, Mike Henry and Richard Appel, the episode originally aired on Fox in the United States on September 27, 2009, along with the season 8 premiere of Family Guy. The episode follows Cleveland Brown, and his son, Cleveland, Jr., as they begin their journey across the country, with a final destination of California. The two give a final farewell to their friends in Quahog, Rhode Island, but along the way to their destination, they decide to stop in Cleveland's hometown of Stoolbend, Virginia. While there, Cleveland reconnects with an old crush he had in high school, named Donna Tubbs, and immediately finds love, and eventually a new family. Cleveland and Donna ultimately decide to get married, and the two families begin to accept each other into their new lives.

The series is a spin-off of the animated comedy series Family Guy, which was created by executive producer Seth MacFarlane in 1999. Cleveland Brown, voiced by Mike Henry, was a recurring character on Family Guy, and served as a neighbor to the Griffin family in Quahog. Prior to the pilot of The Cleveland Show, Cleveland last appeared in the seventh season Family Guy episode "Peter's Progress"; he made infrequent guest appearances during the run of the show.

Critical responses to the episode were mixed; critics were mixed on its storyline and numerous cultural references. According to Nielsen ratings, it was viewed in 9.42 million viewers in its original airing. The episode featured guest performances by Alex Borstein, Stacy Ferguson, Seth Green, Mila Kunis, Jennifer Tilly and Patrick Warburton, along with several recurring guest voice actors for the series. "Pilot" was released on DVD along with all twenty other episodes from the first season on September 28, 2010.

== Plot ==
At The Drunken Clam, Cleveland tells Peter, Joe, Quagmire that he has lost his house to Loretta due to their divorce settlement, and that he now has custody of Cleveland Jr., who is now 14 years old and has become incredibly overweight. After having his house damaged by Peter once again, Cleveland decides to leave Quahog and move to California to pursue his dream of being a minor league scout for a professional baseball organization. Before he leaves, Cleveland asks Lois and Bonnie to kiss each other. They do a simple one at first, but then passionately start making out. Peter, Joe, Quagmire and Brian all gaze in shock while Cleveland is happy, as it is the first time he has ever asked for something he really wanted. Later, after saying goodbye to all his friends, Cleveland and Cleveland Jr. leave Quahog.

During the journey, Cleveland makes a two-day stop at his old home town of Stoolbend, Virginia, and shows Cleveland Jr. around his old school. There, he bumps into his old flame Donna Tubbs, who works there as a secretary. She invites him to stay at her house for a couple of days, where Donna relays to Cleveland how she needs a father figure around for her kids after splitting with her delinquent ex-husband, Robert. While at Donna's house, Cleveland is introduced to Donna's kids, Rallo and Roberta, and the neighbors, which include local redneck Lester Krinklesac and his obese wife Kendra, and the family of bears, which include Tim, his wife Arianna, and their son Raymond.

Donna experiences problems with her two kids, and Cleveland agrees to help; this results in him becoming the person Donna needs around. However, a complication occurs when Donna and Robert begin rekindling their old marriage again, devastating Cleveland, who decides to leave for California a night early. However, on the drive, Cleveland Jr. reminds his father on his earlier advice on taking chances in life, and questions him why he is driving away from Donna, the woman he loves. The inevitable happens, and Cleveland races back to the house, crashing Donna and Robert's date, professes his love for her and vows that he will stick around for her and her children unlike Robert. He successfully wins her over, and after a romantic montage and the dismissal of Robert, Cleveland and Donna get married, surrounded by their new friends, neighbors and family.

== Release and reception ==
"Pilot" first aired in the United States on Fox on September 27, 2009. In its original American broadcast, "Pilot" was seen by about 9.42 million households in the US according to Nielsen, becoming the lowest rated Seth MacFarlane animated show pilot.

Reaction to the pilot was mixed. According to Nielsen, the episode's premiere was watched by 9.42 million viewers and earned a 4.9/12 rating in the 18-49 demographics. Ahsan Haque from IGN gave the premiere 8.3/10. However, it currently has a rating of 57/100 on Metacritic.

The A.V. Club graded the episode a C−, stating "There are a lot of elements that make The Cleveland Show seem like it should work better than it does, but as a whole, it hasn’t quite managed to stand up and differentiate itself enough from its parent show to be taken as its own thing".

The Parents Television Council, a conservative media watchdog group and frequent critic of MacFarlane-produced programs, named the series' premiere episode its "Worst TV Show of the Week" for the week ending October 2, 2009, due to sexually explicit humor. The authors cited a number of scenes, including the send-off scene where Lois Griffin and Bonnie Swanson oblige Cleveland's request to passionately kiss; Cleveland's remarks to his son about the sexual desires of female students at his alma mater; his demanding to Roberta's date that he bring her home exactly on time (not for her safety, but for his own sexual gratification, the PTC stated); Cleveland — after attempting to reinstate Rallo at school after he was suspended for peeking up his teacher's skirt — encouraging Rallo to continue his behavior; and the episode-closing incest joke that made reference to The Brady Bunch.
