= The Former Life of Brian =

- Family Guy episode
- Episode no.: Season 6 Episode 11
- Directed by: Pete Michels
- Written by: Steve Callaghan
- Production code: 6ACX04
- Original air date: April 27, 2008

Guest appearances
- Harvey Fierstein as Tracy; Chace Crawford as Paul; Erinn Hayes as Attractive Mom; Max Burkholder as Kid in Audience

Episode chronology
← Previous "Play It Again, Brian"	Next → "Long John Peter"
- Family Guy season 6

"The Former Life of Brian" is the eleventh episode of the sixth season of Family Guy. It was originally broadcast on Fox on April 27, 2008. The episode follows the Griffins' anthropomorphic dog, Brian (Seth MacFarlane), as he discovers that he is the biological father of a 13-year-old boy named Dylan (Seth Green). Dylan's mother, Tracy Flannigan (Harvey Fierstein), leaves him with Brian after they meet and Dylan starts causing mischief at the Griffins' house.

The episode was written by Steve Callaghan and directed by Pete Michels. The episode guest starred Harvey Fierstein, Chace Crawford, Erinn Hayes and Max Burkholder. Recurring voice actors Patrick Warburton, writer Alec Sulkin, episode writer Steve Callaghan, writer John Viener and show creator Seth MacFarlane's sister Rachael MacFarlane made minor appearances. It received mixed reviews from critics.

== Plot ==
Brian (Seth MacFarlane) decides to visit his former girlfriend Tracy Flannigan (Harvey Fierstein), who reveals that she has a son named Dylan (Seth Green) and that he is the father. Dylan proves to be quite the unruly teenager and Brian laments to Peter (MacFarlane) and Lois (Alex Borstein) about his experiences with him. Despite his objections, they attempt to convince him that he should take responsibility for his son. At this time, Dylan arrives at the Griffins' house, explaining that Tracy dropped him off for Brian to raise. There he begins tearing the house apart and acts hostile toward everyone, even attacking the Evil Monkey in Chris's closet. He especially acts hostile towards Brian, who decides to take control and kick him out. However, after he attempts to leave with a bag of Brian's cannabis, they discover a shared enjoyment of the drug and the two smoke up and bond. When Brian apologizes for not being there for Dylan when he was born, it leads to an emotional reconciliation.

Brian quickly shapes Dylan up to be a fine young man, though he himself begins to act a bit self-righteous in his newly discovered role as father. Peter feels very uncomfortable about this, so he decides to convince Tracy to take Dylan back to live with her in the hopes that Brian would go back to normal. While Brian attempts to justify his behavior, Dylan steps up, saying it is time for him to turn his mother's life around just as Brian had done for him. Brian agrees, and the two part ways.

== Production ==
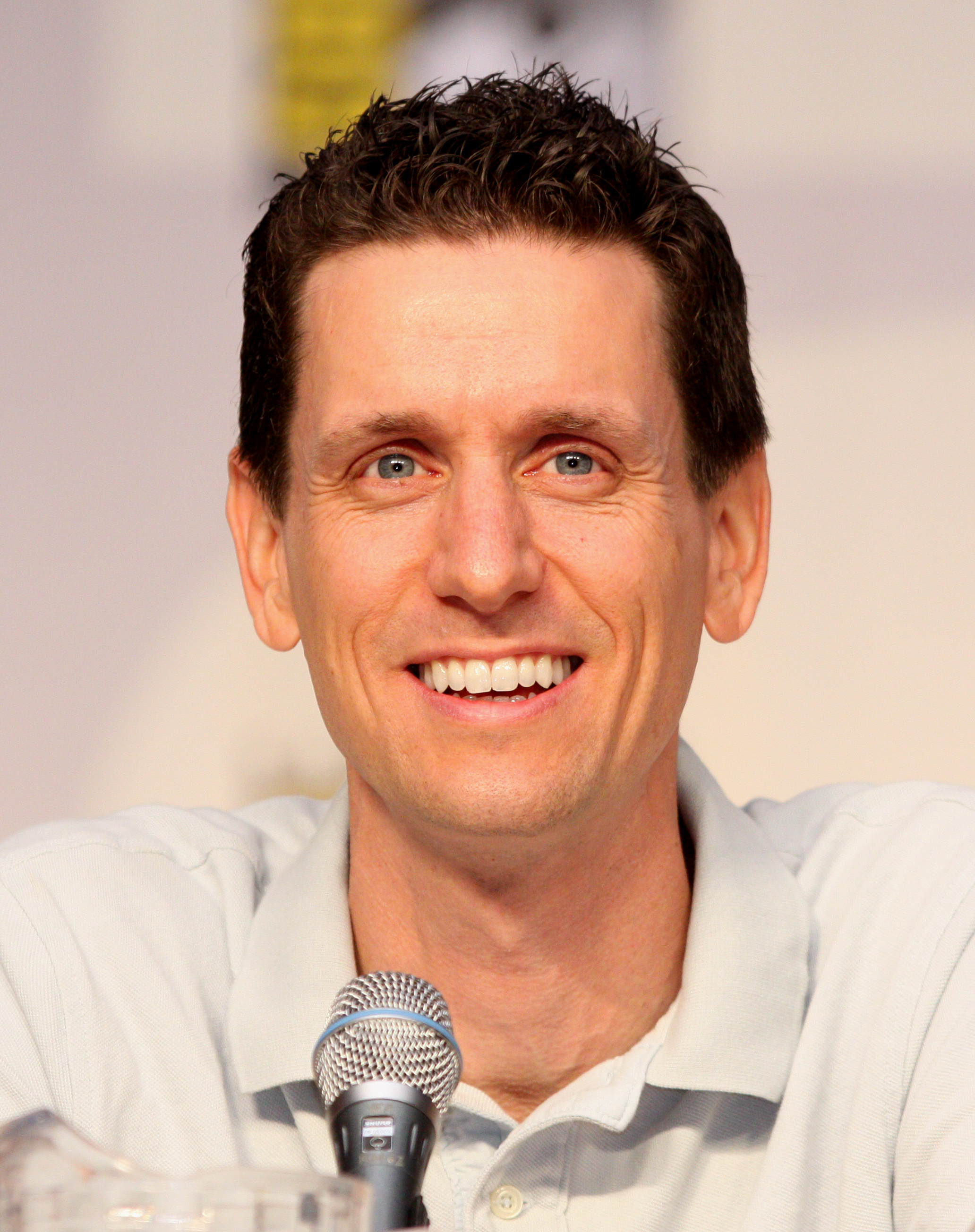
Steve Callaghan wrote the episode.

The episode was written by Steve Callaghan, in his second writing credit for the season, as he has written "Lois Kills Stewie" earlier in the season. It was directed by Pete Michels, also on his second working episode of the season (he directed "Padre de Familia" earlier in the season). Series regulars Peter Shin and James Purdun acted as supervising directors for the episode. The episode's music was composed by Walter Murphy. The episode marked the first appearance of Brian's son Dylan, voiced by one of the shows main voice actors, Seth Green.

"The Former Life of Brian", along with the last four episodes of the sixth season and the first eight episodes of the seventh season were released on DVD by 20th Century Fox Home Entertainment in the United States and Canada on June 16, 2009, one month after it had completed broadcast on television. The "Volume 7" DVD release features bonus material including deleted scenes, animatics, and commentaries for every episode.

In addition to the regular cast, actor Harvey Fierstein, actor Chace Crawford, actress Erinn Hayes and actor Max Burkholder made guest appearances in the episode. Recurring voice actors Patrick Warburton, writer Alec Sulkin, episode writer Steve Callaghan, writer John Viener and show creator Seth MacFarlane's sister Rachael MacFarlane made minor appearances.

== Cultural references ==
When Brian finds out that he has a son, Stewie, with much anticipation, yells "Jerry! Jerry! Jerry!" in reference to The Jerry Springer Show. Dylan ties Meg to a chair and makes her watch 178 hours of Monty Python that were not funny or memorable. In a scene, Sonny the Cuckoo Bird being subjected to a psychological evaluation, where the tester presents to him a bowl of the cereal to test his reaction; this is a reference to his famous motto "cuckoo for Cocoa Puffs!".

When Brian finds his magician outfit, Peter is seen wearing a "Count Crotchula" costume; this is a reference to the breakfast cereal and character of the same name, Count Chocula. In a scene Dorothy says goodbye to the Cowardly Lion, Tin Man and Scarecrow, all of them from the film The Wizard of Oz. When Peter gets his hair cut by Dylan, he is able to grow it back thanks to being "full of Play-Doh".

== Reception ==
In its original broadcast on April 27, 2008, "The Former Life of Brian" was watched by 8.42 million households according to the Nielsen ratings, the audience measurement systems developed to determine the audience size and composition of television programming in the United States. The episode acquired a 4.3 rating/10 share in the 18–49 demographic,

The episode received mixed reviews from critics. Ahsan Haque of IGN wrote that "not all of the manatee jokes were hits, but the storyline makes up for it". He graded "The Former Life of Brian" 8.3 out of 10. Brad Trechak of TV Squad called the episode "pretty good" and stated that "it had its ups and downs but it came out ahead overall".

Genevieve Koski of The A.V. Club criticized the episode, saying that it "didn't really offer many surprises or laughs", and commenting that Brian is "too much of a straight man to carry an arc with one-time character no one cares about". She graded "The Former Life of Brian" C+. Greg Rock of the Parents Television Council, an organization that has frequently criticized the series, named this episode the "Worst TV Show of the Week".
