= Love, Blactually =

- Family Guy episode
- Episode no.: Season 7 Episode 1
- Directed by: Cyndi Tang
- Written by: Mike Henry
- Production code: 6ACX03
- Original air date: September 28, 2008

Guest appearance
- Kat Foster as Carolyn

Episode chronology
← Previous "Long John Peter"	Next → "I Dream of Jesus"
- Family Guy season 7

"Love, Blactually" is the first episode in the seventh season of the American animated television series Family Guy. It originally aired on Fox in the United States on September 28, 2008. The episode features anthropomorphic dog Brian as he meets a fellow atheist named Carolyn (Kat Foster) at a book store, and the two begin dating. Heeding advice from Stewie (also voiced by MacFarlane), Brian decides not to have sex with her. Carolyn is led to believe that Brian does not want a substantive relationship, so she begins to date Cleveland (Mike Henry). The episode was originally slated to air during season six on March 2, 2008, but was replaced with "Play It Again, Brian" for unknown reasons.

The episode was written by Henry, and directed by Cyndi Tang. It received generally positive reviews from critics for its storyline. According to Nielsen ratings, it was watched by 9.2 million viewers in its original airing. The episode featured guest performances by Foster, along with several recurring voice actors from the series. "Love, Blactually" was released on DVD along with eight other episodes from the season on June 16, 2009. The title of the episode is a reference to the 2003 romantic comedy film Love Actually.

== Plot ==
After going to the bookstore to buy The God Delusion, Brian meets an atheist named Carolyn, who happens to be looking for the same book. Brian becomes interested in Carolyn, and the two begin to date. When she invites him to her house, Stewie tells Brian that his relationships fail because he has sex with his girlfriends immediately when they meet. Brian realizes that Stewie is right and decides to take things slow. However, after three weeks, he finds out that Carolyn has begun to date Cleveland, since she assumed Brian just wanted to be friends. A heartbroken Brian tries to deal with his loss, but keeps running into Cleveland and Carolyn having sex in various locations.

Feeling bad for his botched advice that cost Brian a relationship with Carolyn, Stewie suggests that he can convince Cleveland's ex-wife, Loretta, to reconcile with him. The two visit Loretta in her own home and learn that she feels guilty for cheating on him with Quagmire, and believes she can never go back to Cleveland. Later, Cleveland visits Brian to clear the air with him but reveals that he plans to elope with Carolyn in Hawaii, which makes their friendship tense. Just as Cleveland leaves, Loretta arrives and apologizes to him for her affair with Quagmire; she begs him to allow her to get their family back together and promises she will never betray him again. Cleveland seeks advice from Peter and Lois, who attempt to dissuade Cleveland from going back to Loretta, but Brian, seeing his only chance at getting back with Carolyn, says Cleveland should "forgive and forget", and lies about Loretta's good qualities, which Peter immediately sees through and points out that she cannot be trusted.

When Cleveland decides to wait until the next day to consider his thoughts, Peter recruits Quagmire to have sex with Loretta again so Cleveland can see she has not changed. Quagmire meets her at the hotel she is staying in, but this time, Loretta resists his advances and tells him to leave after smashing his face with an iron. When Cleveland shows up to her room, he forgives her, but insists that they both must move on while Loretta lives her life as amazing and wonderful as she can. Cleveland finally leaves as Loretta tearfully watches on. When Cleveland visits Carolyn, he finds her and Quagmire having sex, apparently the same way it happened to Brian. After this, Cleveland apologizes to Brian for stealing Carolyn and they make amends, with the former revealing himself to have received a genital wart.

== Production ==
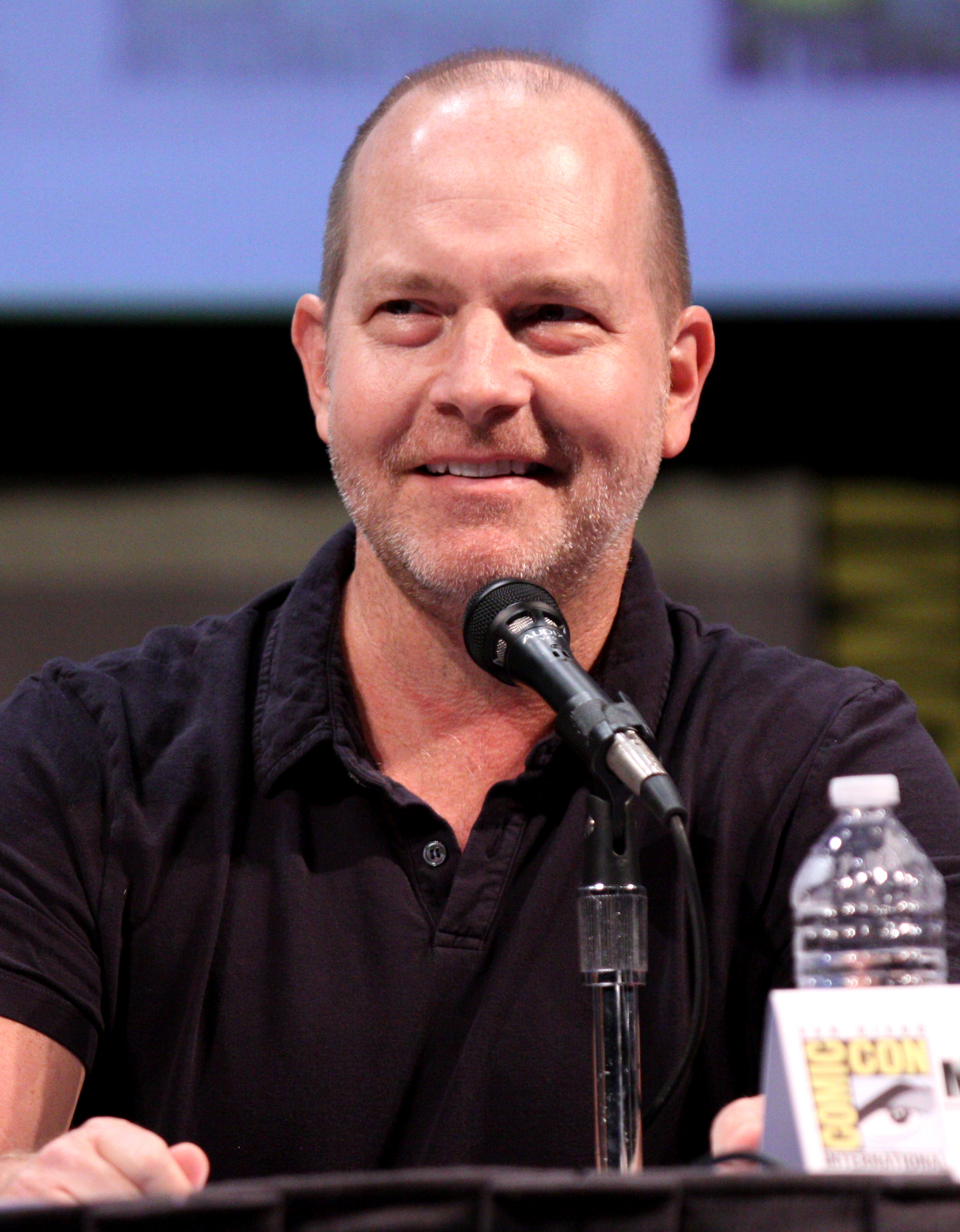
Mike Henry, who voices Cleveland, wrote the episode.

"Love, Blactually" is the season premiere of the seventh season of Family Guy. It was written by one of the show's main voice actors, Mike Henry, in his first episode of the season. The episode dealt a lot with the character of Cleveland Brown, which is one of the characters for which Henry provides the voice. The episode was directed by Cyndi Tang, who has been with the show since its fifth season. Series regulars Peter Shin and James Purdum served as supervising directors for the episode. The episode is one of the last to concentrate on the character of Cleveland, since he would be moved to The Cleveland Show (which Henry co-created).

"Love, Blactually", along with the first eight episodes of the seventh season were released on DVD by 20th Century Fox Home Entertainment in the United States and Canada on June 16, 2009, one month after it had completed broadcast on television. The "Volume 7" DVD release features bonus material including deleted scenes, animatics, and commentaries for every episode.

In addition to the regular cast, actress Kat Foster portrayed the voice of Carolyn. Recurring voice actors Ralph Garman, writer Danny Smith, writer Alec Sulkin, and writer John Viener also made minor appearances. Then-series writer and regular voice actress Alex Borstein portrayed the voice of Loretta Brown.

== Cultural references ==
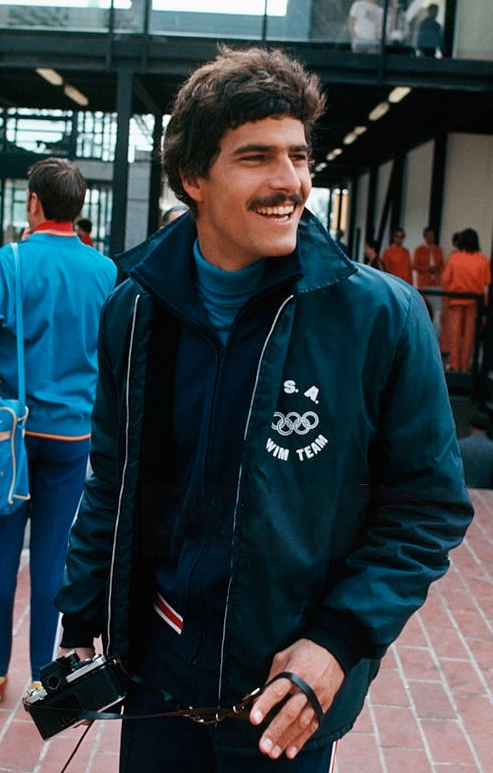
Joe goes to a costume party as swimmer Mark Spitz

The episode begins with a costume party, where Brian and Stewie are both dressed as Snoopy from Peanuts, Quagmire dresses up as Napoleon Dynamite, Peter as Laura Bush, Lois as Michael Dutton Douglas, Joe as Mark Spitz (although people believe he is a crippled Thomas Magnum), and Cleveland as Charlie Chaplin. Woodstock, another character from Peanuts also makes a cameo appearance. The popular conversation between Stewie and Brian which draws attention to a hard "h" consonant sound is directly sourced from dialogue within the film Hot Rod. Stewie finds a book entitled Horton Hears Domestic Violence in the Next Apartment and Doesn't Call 911!, a parody of Horton Hears a Who! Cleveland's deadpan exclamation of "...and boom goes the dynamite" is a reference to the popular catchphrase which became an Internet sensation. Cleveland and Carolyn meet at a Starbucks. Peter doesn't remember the name of Cleveland's ex-wife (Loretta) and he guesses that it's Jennifer Hudson.

== Reception ==
The episode was watched by 9.2 million viewers, compared to 9.3 million that tuned in to The Simpsons and 7 million that watched King of the Hill for their season openers on Fox. The episode received positive reviews. Ahsan Haque of IGN praised "Love, Blactually", writing that it had "many memorable scenes, quote-worthy dialogue, politically incorrect references, and great storyline". He graded the episode 8.9 out of 10. Steve Heisler of The A.V. Club wrote that the episode was "pretty funny overall" with "some great meta-commentary", and graded it B+. In contrast, Robin Pierson of The TV Critic gave the episode a negative review, saying that Family Guy has become like the shows it mocked in its earlier seasons and he ended his review by stating that it has become "predictable, stale and irritating to watch" and he gave it a 29 out of a possible 100.
