= Saving Private Brian =

- Family Guy episode
- Episode no.: Season 5 Episode 4
- Directed by: Cyndi Tang
- Written by: Cherry Chevapravatdumrong
- Production code: 4ACX34
- Original air date: November 5, 2006

Guest appearances
- Gary Cole; Louis Gossett Jr. as the Drill Sergeant; Juanita Jennings; Phil LaMarr as Muddy Waters; Samm Levine; Rachael MacFarlane; Denis Martel; Enn Reitel as Mickey Rooney; Stacey Scowley; Fred Tatasciore; Wally Wingert

Episode chronology
← Previous "Hell Comes to Quahog"	Next → "Whistle While Your Wife Works"
- Family Guy season 5

"Saving Private Brian" is the fourth episode of season five of Family Guy, an episode produced for Season 5. The episode originally broadcast on Fox on November 5, 2006. The episode follows Stewie and Brian after they unintentionally join the United States Army, and end up leaving to serve in Iraq, only to return home when the war ends. Meanwhile, Chris joins a heavy metal band, and develops an anti-social attitude, which requires Marilyn Manson to intervene.

The episode was written by Cherry Chevapravatdumrong and directed by Cyndi Tang. It received mostly positive reviews from critics for its storyline and many cultural references. According to Nielsen ratings, it was viewed in 8.45 million homes in its original airing. The episode featured guest performances by Gary Cole, Louis Gossett Jr., Juanita Jennings, Phil LaMarr, Samm Levine, Rachael MacFarlane, Denis Martel, Enn Reitel, Stacey Scowley, Fred Tatasciore and Wally Wingert, along with several recurring guest voice actors for the series.

== Plot ==
A U.S. Army recruitment officer comes to the high school to hold an assembly and entices the students with a glamorized, deceptive video presentation, which impresses everyone including Chris. Chris returns home and tells the family at dinner that he wants to enlist. Lois attempts to dissuade him. The next day, while driving Stewie to Gymboree Play & Music for parachute day, Brian decides to take a detour to the recruitment office to scold the recruiting officer for trying to trick Chris through devious means. The two arrive at the office but the wait is long; when Brian goes to top-up the parking meter, Stewie walks into the office. Stewie ends up enlisting in the Army and signs Brian up as well when told there "is a $100 bonus for signing up a buddy." Brian returns and is shocked. Brian and Stewie begin basic training, but Brian becomes stressed from the discipline and decides one night to leave. Stewie wakes up and finds Brian packing his suitcase, but he manages to talk him out of leaving, insisting that he had never finished anything significant in his life and that the Army will provide him the discipline he needs. With this, Brian decides to stay. After they complete their training, Stewie and Brian are immediately deployed to Iraq. The two are patrolling the streets of a village, commenting on the "good situation so far"; however, after the pair get caught up in a terrorist attack, they become dissuaded and decide to find a way to get out of the Army and return home. They first attempt to be discharged by pretending to be homosexual (only to discover that one of their superiors is gay). As a last resort, they attempt to get "Wounded in Action" by shooting each other in the foot; they do this, only to find out from another of their superiors that the Army now takes anyone no matter what, going so far as to allow two corpses to guard the ammunition. Suddenly, a soldier arrives with the news that "democracy just kicked in", and the war is over, thus meaning all the soldiers can return to the United States.

Meanwhile, to distract Chris from the Army, Peter takes him to look at extracurricular activities at his school, where he is accepted into a heavy metal band. Chris develops a rebellious and rude attitude after joining the band, and he significantly changes his appearance. Peter and Lois, worried about his behavior, search his room to find the cause of his behavioral change; Lois becomes convinced it is a result of listening to the violent lyrics from his music. In addition, they find a poster shrine to Marilyn Manson in his closet, and become convinced that his music corrupted their son. They decide to track down Manson and find him at the Grammys Music Awards. When they find Manson, Peter punches him in the face and Lois accuses him for destroying their son with his songs. Manson, played by writer Tom Devanney, laughing at "this old thing again", offers to help them with Chris. Manson returns to the Griffin house with Peter and Lois, where he tells Chris and his bandmates that it is important to respect and obey their parents, and in addition to mending the tension between them, Manson ends the episode by giving Peter some more parental advice: Peter and Chris should start fishing.

== Production ==
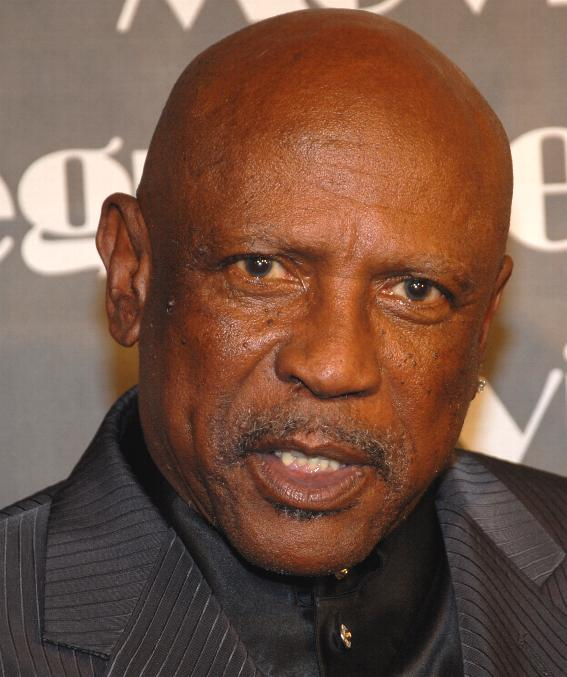
Louis Gossett Jr. guest starred in the episode.

The scene in which recruitment officers enter public schools in an attempt to recruit children is based on real life, as the Army has often sent recruiters to high schools for seniors. More recently they have started with the younger grades even though there is a minimum age for enlistment. The show also featured the last (living) appearance of Johnny and Vern, the vaudeville performers; Stewie shoots them because, as MacFarlane comments, "people were getting sick of them", with David Goodman adding that "the show was relying on them too much". The duo return in "Back to the Woods", with Vern as a ghost and Johnny in Hell.

Upon the receiving of the news that democracy has come to Iraq, one scene shows a man having a knife held to his throat, which caused some controversy after the episode was broadcast. Stewie also knowingly breaks the fourth wall in the episode, by speaking in a manner as if he were talking to the audience. In one scene, Stewie mentions the time "Peter went after that hockey coach" (making a veiled reference to "Hockey Dad" Thomas Junta), in the expectation of a cutaway gag. However, nothing happens, and Stewie comments, "Oh, no clip? Thought we had a clip". This scene was described as being a one off.

In addition to the regular cast, actor Gary Cole, actor Louis Gossett Jr., actress Juanita Jennings, voice actor Phil LaMarr, actor Samm Levine, voice actress Rachael MacFarlane, actor Denis Martel, voice actor Enn Reitel, actress Stacey Scowley, voice actor Fred Tatasciore and voice actor Wally Wingert guest starred in the episode. Recurring guest voice actors Alex Breckenridge, Chris Cox, writer Tom Devanney, actor Ralph Garman, writer Danny Smith, writer Alec Sulkin and writer John Viener made minor appearances. Actor Adam West also has a guest appearance in the episode.

== Cultural references ==
French football player Zinedine Zidane as he appears in the episode, headbutting an old lady as part of her birthday telegram.

The title is a pun on Steven Spielberg's hit war film Saving Private Ryan. Several scenes from the Army training contained real-life references; when the recruits are marching, they begin to sing and dance; this is a reference to West Side Story. Additionally, the recruitment video is set to the Def Leppard song "Pour Some Sugar On Me". When Peter visits a psychiatrist, the psychiatrist is Dr. Katz. The training is similar to that in the film Full Metal Jacket, also spoofing the scene when the Sergeant found contraband food. The Sergeant punishes Brian by informing him that he will have to listen to singles from Chris Gaines' album: this entire scene was based on a sketch from Saturday Night Live approximately 10 years ago. Peter references actor Gregory Peck and his "kids" with a cutaway gag featuring four Pecks in a car. Brian shown performing numerous different tasks to complete his army training is a reference to An Officer and a Gentleman, with the music playing in the background from Stripes. The lyrics Lois reads from the Wu-Tang Clan album is from the song "Bring Da Ruckus", the first track from their album Enter the Wu-Tang (36 Chambers). The scene where Marilyn Manson tells Chris about nutrition is a reference to an episode of Clone High, where Manson leads a musical scene about the importance of the food pyramid. The sign outside of the building where the Grammys are being held says "Welcome to the Grammys (Not You, Fred Durst)", a reference to the lead singer of Limp Bizkit. Stewie misunderstands the location of their deployment to be "Fraggle Ir-Rock", rather than Iraq, referring to the TV show Fraggle Rock. The scene where Zinedine Zidane headbutts an old lady while delivering her a birthday cake is based on the incident that happened in the 2006 FIFA World Cup final, when Zidane headbutted Marco Materazzi. When Brian is frustrated with the recruits recommending Chris to join the Army, Stewie jokes that "the bottom 10% of our high school class is off to fight another battle". After hearing Stewie, Brian says that he was plagiarizing from The Onion, since Brian read about the war in Iraq in The Onion. During the obstacle course, Brian rides a unicycle, solves a Rubik's Cube, plays Perfection, finds Waldo, offers a couple eating a salad at a dinner table some fresh pepper, and consoles a woman who was just dumped by her boyfriend.

== Reception ==
In a significant decrease from the previous week, the episode was viewed in 8.45 million homes in its original airing, according to Nielsen ratings. The episode also acquired a 3.0 rating in the 18–49 demographic, slightly being edged out by The Simpsons, while still winning over series creator Seth MacFarlane's second show American Dad!.

IGN commented that the portrayal of "service in the military is a hilarious satire of the current state of our military in Iraq". Iverson was also impressed with the episode's random flashback gags, commenting that "normally they are only groan-worthy," receiving a final rating of 9/10. Brett Love of TV Squad noted that "The Full Metal Jacket/Stripes angle for Stewie and Brian was great, right down to the Stripes music during the obstacle course. And Louis Gossett Jr. as Sergeant Angryman is a nice bit of casting."
