= Spies Reminiscent of Us =

- Family Guy episode
- Brian and Stewie with spies Chevy Chase and Dan Aykroyd on a mission in Russia
- Episode no.: Season 8 Episode 3
- Directed by: Cyndi Tang-Loveland
- Written by: Alec Sulkin
- Production code: 7ACX03
- Original air date: October 11, 2009

Guest appearances
- Dan Aykroyd as himself; Chevy Chase as himself; Gary Cole as Mike Brady; Dimitri Diatchenko as Russian Porcupine and Russian Guard #2; James Lipton as himself; Henriette Mantel as Alice Nelson; Chris Parson as B.B. King; Nicole Sullivan; Mae Whitman

Episode chronology
← Previous "Family Goy"	Next → "Brian's Got a Brand New Bag"
- Family Guy season 8

"Spies Reminiscent of Us" is the third episode of the eighth season of the animated comedy series Family Guy. It originally aired on Fox in the United States on October 11, 2009. The episode pays homage to the 1985 comedy film Spies Like Us, featuring baby Stewie and anthropomorphic dog Brian as they discover that American spies Chevy Chase and Dan Aykroyd have moved into their neighbor Cleveland Brown's old house; they eventually follow them on a secret mission to Russia. Meanwhile, Peter, Joe, and Quagmire attempt to start an improv comedy group with very little success.

The episode was written by Alec Sulkin and directed by Cyndi Tang-Loveland. It received positive reviews from critics. According to Nielsen ratings, it was viewed in 8.88 million homes in its original airing. The episode featured guest performances by Dan Aykroyd, Chevy Chase, Gary Cole, Dimitri Diatchenko, James Lipton, Henriette Mantel, Chris Parson, Nicole Sullivan, and Mae Whitman, along with several recurring guest voice actors for the series. "Spies Reminiscent of Us" was released on DVD along with seven other episodes from the season on June 15, 2010.

== Plot ==
Peter loses to Lois in a race for the bathroom and finds their other bathroom is occupied by a transfer student (a talking elephant) from Africa. Angered, Peter begins frequenting the toilet at Cleveland's old house, which he has vacated after his divorce with Loretta and moving to Virginia, and later became completely vacant after Loretta died. He tells this to Lois before proceeding to use Cleveland's bathroom while dancing to Jennifer Lopez's "Let's Get Loud". The house is eventually rented to actors Chevy Chase and Dan Aykroyd, and Peter invites the two actors to his house for dinner. Peter shows them some of his comedy bits, including a crude impersonation of John Wayne, which Chase, Aykroyd and Lois find painfully unfunny.

Suspicious as to why Chase and Aykroyd are living in their neighborhood, Stewie and Brian investigate the house and discover a secret underground military facility, eventually learning that the two actors were made real spies by Ronald Reagan after he saw their film Spies Like Us. Chase and Aykroyd explain that during the Cold War, the Soviet Union turned dozens of American citizens into sleeper agents who would fall into a trance and do the bidding of the KGB upon hearing the phrase, "Gosh, that Italian family at the next table sure is quiet," – a phrase no one would normally use. They also explain that they are looking for one of the sleeper agents, who they were informed resides in Quahog. Chase and Aykroyd ask Brian and Stewie to help them in their mission, noting that they know several people acting very strangely in Quahog. Brian and Stewie accept the offer.

The four spies head to City Hall to warn Mayor West about the sleeper agent, but they discover that the mayor is the sleeper agent when Aykroyd inadvertently uses the trigger phrase. During the ensuing fight, Aykroyd plants a homing beacon on Mayor West's leg. West escapes to Russia and the four follow him. However, they immediately stand out as US agents, and are subsequently arrested and brought into the office of Prime Minister Vladimir Putin, who explains that the sleeper agent plan would be an embarrassment to their government if revealed to the public. He offers to help them stop West from fulfilling his pre-programmed mission by providing them transportation. When the four find West, they see him launch a nuclear missile aimed at the United States before he snaps out of his trance. Mayor West holds himself responsible for America's fate, though Brian comforts him with the knowledge that he was not in control of his actions, having been brainwashed by the Soviets. Aykroyd realizes that he can hack into the missile's guidance system. This allows him to aim the missile's warhead high above the Earth's atmosphere and harmlessly explode, saving the US. The fuselage, though, crashes into Cleveland's house in Stoolbend, Virginia, while Cleveland was taking a bath, eliciting confusion from his neighbor, Tim the Bear. The episode ends with Brian and Stewie in the family living room as they recount their adventure and repeat the activation phrase, which reveals Meg to be another sleeper agent, but she is told to shut up by her contact.

Meanwhile, Peter spends the rest of the episode working in an improv comedy group with Quagmire and Joe. Quagmire attempts to educate the others on the fine art of improv comedy but when they try to do a live show, Peter's lack of conscious comedic knowledge completely gives way to his John Wayne impersonations, which the audience finds hilarious. This, along with Joe's fecal incontinence, forces Quagmire to end the show early and conclude that this is something that should never have been attempted.

== Production and development ==
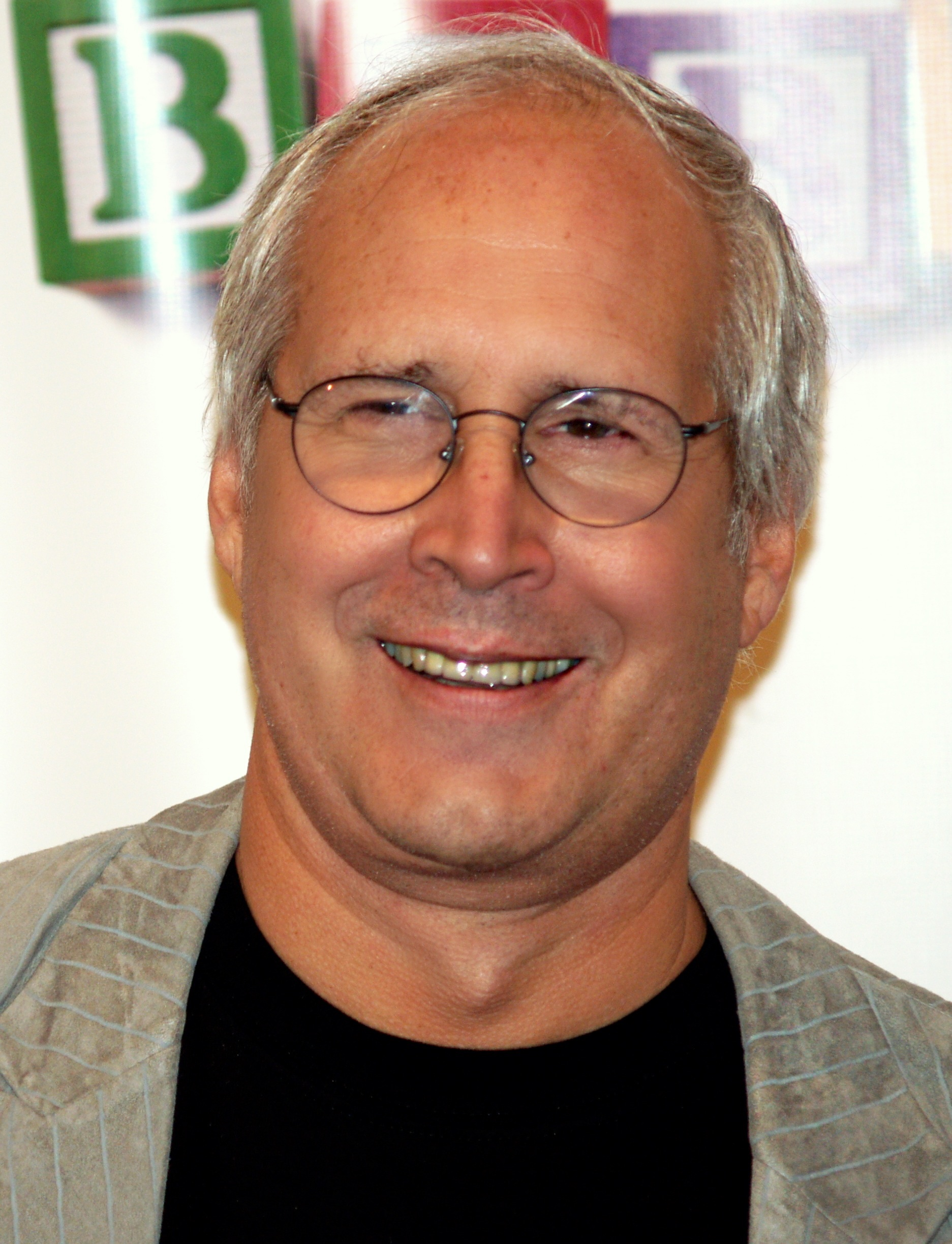
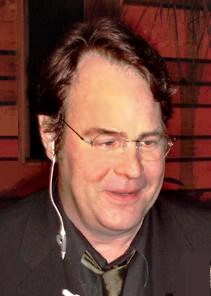
Actors Chevy Chase and Dan Aykroyd portrayed animated versions of themselves in the episode.

The episode was written by series regular Alec Sulkin and directed by Cyndi Tang-Loveland in her first episode for the eighth production season. The episode was originally intended to be a "Road to" episode, entitled "Road to '85", but was switched with "Road to the Multiverse" instead. Series creator Seth MacFarlane was convinced by "Road to the Multiverse" director Greg Colton to make the change, due to the subplot that involved Peter, which caused it to "not feel like a Road show". Series regulars Peter Shin and James Purdum served as supervising directors, and series creator and executive producer Seth MacFarlane and David Zuckerman served as the episode's staff writers.

At the end of the episode, when Meg is revealed to be another sleeper agent by speaking Russian, it gave Mila Kunis an opportunity to voice a line in her native language.

"Spies Reminiscent of Us", along with the seven other episodes from Family Guy's eighth season, were released on a three-disc DVD set in the United States on June 15, 2010. The sets included brief audio commentaries by Seth MacFarlane and various crew and cast members for several episodes, a collection of deleted scenes, a special mini-feature which discussed the process behind animating "Road to the Multiverse", and a mini-feature entitled Family Guy Karaoke.

The episode saw the second re-appearance, the first being a brief appearance in "Road to the Multiverse", by former main cast member and writer Mike Henry as the voice of Cleveland Brown. The actor had previously left the role on Family Guy to star as the character in his own spin-off The Cleveland Show, co-created by Seth MacFarlane, Mike Henry, and Richard Appel. In addition to the regular cast, actors Dan Aykroyd, Chevy Chase, and Gary Cole; voice actors Dimitri Diatchenko and Chris Parson; writer, actor, and television host James Lipton; actresses Henriette Mantel and Mae Whitman; and voice actress Nicole Sullivan guest starred in the episode. Recurring guest voice actors Johnny Brennan, actor Ralph Garman, writer and showrunner Mark Hentemann, writer Alec Sulkin and writer John Viener also made minor appearances. Actors Adam West and Patrick Warburton made appearances as well.

== Cultural references ==
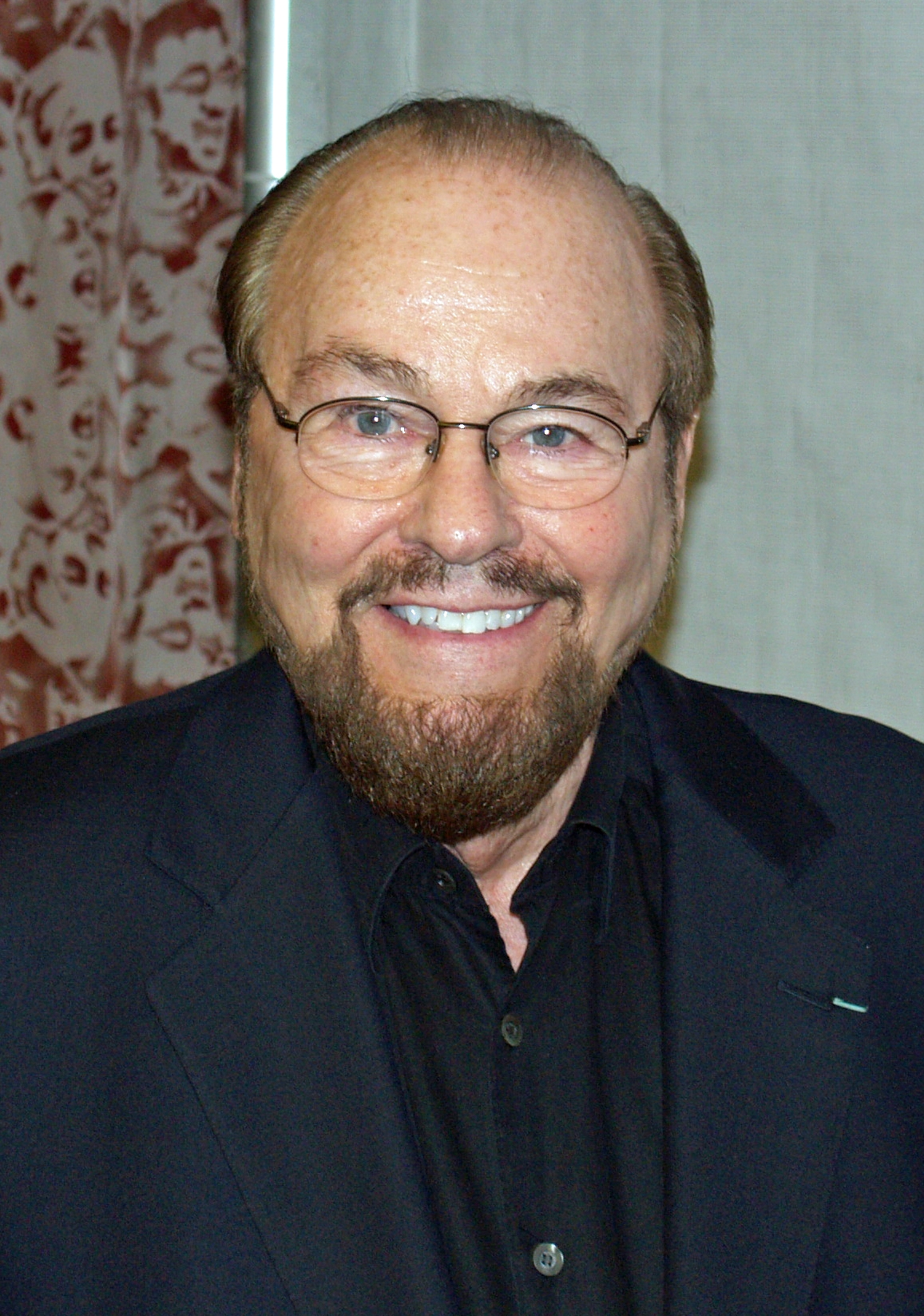
Actor and writer James Lipton appeared in this episode.

The episode was largely based upon the 1985 film Spies Like Us, which starred Chevy Chase and Dan Aykroyd, and the movie is mentioned in the episode itself. The episode was also based on the 1977 spy film Telefon about brainwashed Russian spies in the U.S. who can be activated by a special code phrase. When Peter has to go to the bathroom, he runs to Cleveland's empty home, which has been put up for sale since he left to live in Virginia with his new family. A montage of Peter going to the bathroom is shown, while Jennifer Lopez's "Let's Get Loud" plays. When Peter becomes aware that Cleveland's house is being rented by actors Chevy Chase and Dan Aykroyd, he mentions that he is honored to have dinner with "two of the three Ghostbusters." Chase then replies that he was not in that movie; Peter also notes that he is honored to meet "two of the Three Amigos," a movie starring Chase but not Aykroyd. After dinner, Stewie is seen drawing and coloring Sebastian the crab, a character from the Disney film The Little Mermaid. When Aykroyd and Chase ask Stewie and Brian if they want to be "spies like us", Stewie asks if they can be "spies like them" and points to Black Spy and White Spy from Spy vs. Spy, one of the head comic strip features of MAD magazine. When Aykroyd and Chase explain to Stewie and Brian how they were recruited as official spies by Reagan, a cutaway is shown of an event in which 1985 is awarded the "Awesomest Year of the 80's" prize and all characters spontaneously start dancing to the 1983 song "(Keep Feeling) Fascination." Later, Brian and Stewie agree to become agents, and Stewie asks if "Ron Howard's weird-looking brother is here." There is a cutaway to The Brady Bunch, in which it is revealed Mike Brady killed his first wife, and housekeeper Alice walks in and demands a raise.

Back in Quahog, when Peter, Joe, and Quagmire discuss how to prove to Chase and Aykroyd that they know what is funny, Quagmire asks what the most consistent form of comedy is, to which Joe responds "improv." This causes Peter, Joe, and Quagmire to yell "improv" repeatedly, until live-action footage of James Lipton saying the word "improv" is shown. When Stewie, Brian, Chevy, and Dan land in Russia, the device Dan uses to track the beacon in Adam West's ankle looks like a PKE meter from Ghostbusters. Vladimir Putin makes an appearance in the episode, and asks if Brian and Stewie would like to see a Russian Cutaway Gag. They agree and the viewers are presented with a hedgehog in a foggy forest. The hedgehog then goes on to say, "What kind of idiots would make a porcupine sandwich without bread? These no-good bastards!" and laughs. This is a nod to the Russian-made animated film Hedgehog in the Fog.

== Reception ==
In its initial broadcast, this episode received a Nielsen rating of 5.1/8, totaling 8.88 million viewers in the 18–19 demographic. The episode ranked one of the lowest in the 9:00PM timeslot, behind The Amazing Race on CBS, Sunday Night Football on NBC, and Desperate Housewives; however, it was ahead of fellow Fox animated sitcom American Dad!, which was shown immediately after Family Guy.

Reviews of the episode were mostly positive. The A.V. Club's Emily VanDerWerff noted her enjoyment of the storyline, but she mostly enjoyed the episode's inclusion and voice work of Chevy Chase and Dan Aykroyd and commented favorably on the gags that describe Russia as filled with bears on unicycles and that Adam West turns out to be the Russian sleeper agent. She criticized the improv comedy storyline, and commented that improv troupes and 1980s comedies are lazy targets, and ultimately graded the episode a B, tying that of The Simpsons and American Dad!, and beating its spin-off The Cleveland Show. IGN Television critic Ahsan Haque gave the episode a mixed review, stating that he did not like the improv storyline, and he was not amused with Peter's usage of Joe's American flag as toilet paper. However, he praised the scene that involved Stewie's, Brian's, Chevy Chase's, and Dan Aykroyd's travel to Russia, and he ultimately gave the episode 7.7 out of 10.
