= Movin' Out (Brian's Song) =

- Family Guy episode
- Episode no.: Season 6 Episode 2
- Directed by: Cyndi Tang
- Written by: John Viener
- Production code: 5ACX14
- Original air date: September 30, 2007

Guest appearances
- Drew Barrymore as Jillian; H. Jon Benjamin as Carl; Jeff Bergman as Homer Simpson

Episode chronology
← Previous "Blue Harvest"	Next → "Believe It or Not, Joe's Walking on Air"
- Family Guy season 6

"Movin' Out (Brian's Song)" is the second episode of the sixth season of the American animated television series Family Guy. The 100th overall, the episode originally aired on Fox in the United States on September 30, 2007. It was written by John Viener and directed by Cyndi Tang. In the episode, Peter convinces Brian to move in with his girlfriend Jillian and Stewie tags along to help pay the rent. Meanwhile, Meg and Chris get jobs at the convenience store where Chris befriends the manager, prompting Meg to do all the hard work. The episode title is a reference to the Billy Joel song "Movin' Out (Anthony's Song)" and the film Brian's Song. A later episode, Movin' In (Principal Shepherd's Song), has a similar title. This episode marks the end of Brian and Jillian's relationship, which started in season five.

"Movin' Out (Brian's Song)" received generally positive reviews from critics, who praised the episode for having a continuous storyline. Critics also praised Drew Barrymore's performance as Jillian and considered it sorrowful that her character was written out of the series. The episode was viewed by 7.95 million viewers in its original airing, according to Nielsen ratings. "Movin' Out (Brian's Song)" was released onto DVD along with five other episodes from the season on October 21, 2008.

== Plot ==
Brian turns down a chance to see Disney on Ice with Jillian, so she decides to give his ticket to Peter. Brian claims to be relieved, telling Lois he has been feeling smothered lately and needs to focus on his writing. After Peter and Jillian spend the entire day together and greatly enjoy each other's company, Peter convinces Jillian to either force Brian to move in with her, or leave him. Brian is angry at Peter for doing this, as he feels it is too soon for them to have a committed relationship, but after Lois warns him that he is not being fair on Jillian, he agrees to get an apartment with her. Much to his surprise, Brian has a good time living with Jillian, but he realizes that he cannot pay the rent by himself and decides to allow Stewie, who now makes money with his own paper route, to move in with them.

When Brian does not tell Jillian that Stewie is helping with the rent, Stewie quickly gets in the way of Brian and Jillian's happiness living together. After arguing with Brian one night while he is having sex with Jillian, Stewie reveals that he is paying half the rent, prompting Brian to admit he never wanted to move in with Jillian at all. Heartbroken, Jillian leaves Brian, who blames Stewie for ruining the relationship until Stewie tells him it is himself that ruined the relationship due to his initial unwillingness to commit to Jillian. After many failed attempts to lift a saddened Brian's spirits, Stewie convinces Brian to try to get Jillian back. Brian goes to her apartment and asks her to take him back, only to find that she is on a date with Mayor West, who comforted her following their argument and is now living with her. As the two go their separate ways, Brian moves back in with the Griffins.

Meanwhile, Meg is given a job at a local convenience store. Meg is extremely happy with her job and she decides to help Chris get a job there, too. Chris immediately becomes friends with the store owner, Carl, and he is given a large promotion which Carl originally promised to Meg. When Meg takes issue with this, she is fired, and tells Lois of her plight. Lois explains the situation to Chris and tells him to stand up for Meg by getting her job back, which he does by threatening to withhold his opinions of movies he and Carl normally discuss until Carl re-hires her. Meg, in turn, rejects working at the store again, but thanks Chris for standing up for her.

== Production ==
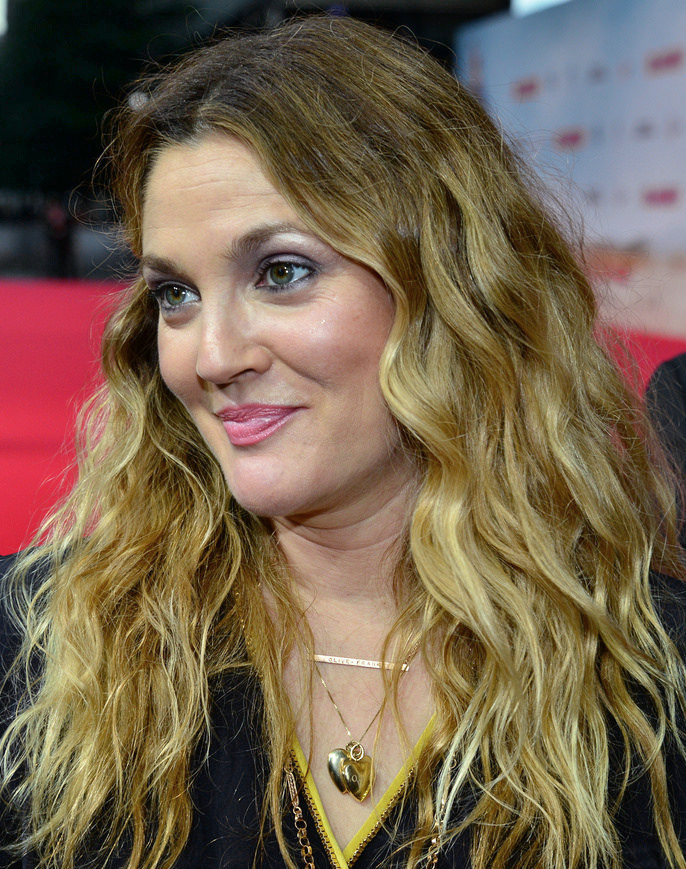
"Movin' Out (Brian's Song)" was, at the time, Drew Barrymore's final episode, ending "the Jillian arc".

"Movin' Out (Brian's Song)" was written by series regular John Viener and directed by series regular Cyndi Tang. Brian's girlfriend Jillian was introduced in season five and this episode marked the end of what the staff called "the Jillian arc". Executive producer David A. Goodman praised Drew Barrymore's voice work as Jillian, saying that "she did such an amazing job with the voice", and was sorry that this was her final episode. The episode was at the time the only Family Guy episode to list the executive producer credits at the end of the episode, because MacFarlane wanted "to wrap it up in kind of a sad way and do it the old-fashioned way." In the original draft of the episode, Jillian had moved in with Quagmire at the end. It was later changed to Jesus, and then to Mayor West, which was kept for the episode.

The episode includes a controversial gag in which Quagmire rapes Marge Simpson, and the two later end up in the Simpson family's house, where Quagmire kills the family by shooting them. The network executives believed the joke was "personal" and told MacFarlane that he could not do a gag with The Simpsons. MacFarlane responded, saying that they had made fun of Family Guy several times, to which the executives replied that they wanted to "end the feud". MacFarlane, however, claimed that there was no feud and told them: "You are afraid of [Simpsons executive producer] James L. Brooks. [...] And that's why we can't do it." Fox eventually cut the gag, which left the episode without a joke at the end of the first act. Brooks and Al Jean were reportedly very upset with the gag, and because of it, Fox told both the Family Guy and The Simpsons staff that they could no longer make fun of one another. However, the gag was included on the DVD set and broadcast on Cartoon Network's Adult Swim. It also aired on Global in Canada.

== Reception ==
In its original broadcast on September 30, 2007, "Movin' Out (Brian's Song)" was viewed by 7.95 million viewers and dropped in 26% from the season premiere, "Blue Harvest". The episode acquired a 4.2 Nielsen rating in the 18–49 demographic. It was the second most watched episode on Fox that night, only behind The Simpsons episode "Homer of Seville". "Movin' Out (Brian's Song)" finished fourth in its timeslot in total viewership, behind ABC's Desperate Housewives, CBS's Cold Case and NBC's Sunday Night Football.

In a simultaneous review of the shows in Fox's Animation Domination block, Genevieve Koski of The A.V. Club praised the episode for having "some actual plot and continuity". She concluded her review, writing: "Jillian has been a pretty good addition to the Family Guy universe, and I think I'm actually sad to see her and Brian break up." She graded the episode B+, the second-highest grade of the night. Ahsan Haque of IGN wrote that the episode "managed to rise about the generic plotline and deliver a pretty solid half-hour of entertainment that told a cohesive (and somewhat sad) main story, with just enough gags to fill in the rest of the time." Haque graded the episode 7.8 out of 10, and wrote that it was "definitely sad to see the end of the Brian and Jillian relationship, especially considering the great performance put on by Drew Barrymore." Brad Trechak of TV Squad called it "a fairly pedestrian episode with a few cute gags".

== Home release ==
"Movin' Out (Brian's Song)", along with the five other episodes from Family Guy's sixth season, were released on a three-disc DVD set in the United States on October 21, 2008. The set included brief audio commentaries by the staff for each episode, a collection of deleted scenes, the 100th-episode special and animatics. It also included several featurettes, such as the making of the 100th episode, "I'm Huge (and The Babes Go Wild)" music video and the staff's favorite scenes.
