= Play It Again, Brian =

- Family Guy episode
- Episode no.: Season 6 Episode 10
- Directed by: John Holmquist
- Written by: Danny Smith
- Production code: 6ACX01
- Original air date: March 2, 2008

Episode chronology
← Previous "Back to the Woods"	Next → "The Former Life of Brian"
- Family Guy season 6

"Play It Again, Brian" is the tenth episode of the sixth season of Family Guy. The episode originally was broadcast on Fox on March 2, 2008. The episode follows Peter and Lois, who are going through a rough time in their marriage. Brian invites them to Martha's Vineyard to see him receive a prize for an essay he wrote. Peter and Lois leave their kids with Herbert.

The episode was written by Danny Smith and it was directed by John Holmquist. Recurring voice actors Lori Alan, Lisa Wilhoit, Bruce Lanoil, Danny Smith, Alec Sulkin, John Viener and Rachael MacFarlane also performed. The episode received mixed reviews from critics.

== Plot ==
Peter and Lois are having marital difficulties after Peter ditches her to spend time with Glenn Quagmire, Cleveland Brown, and Joe Swanson. Brian announces that he has won an award for an essay he wrote and has been invited to Martha's Vineyard to receive it, and offers to take them with him on vacation to ease the anxiety. Peter and Lois agree.

With Quagmire busy, Joe and Bonnie out of town, and Cleveland touring with Black Box, Peter and Lois hire Herbert to look after Meg, Chris and Stewie while they are away. As he always does, Herbert makes several attempts to be near Chris. While Herbert is reading Chris a bedtime story, Chris asks him "Are you a pedophile?" Herbert's answer, if any, is not shown.

When Peter, Lois and Brian arrive at their fancy hotel, Peter immediately annoys Lois while trying to enjoy himself. Lois ignores Peter's misbehavior and agrees to spend the day with Brian. Towards the end of the day, Lois is dismayed to find that Peter has gone off again so she decides to spend the evening with Brian. Brian begins having sexual fantasies about Lois. That evening, Brian reveals to Lois that the essay he wrote was about her, and she thanks him. Brian loses his self-restraint and aggressively makes a pass at Lois. She rebuffs his advances and forces him out of the room. Regretting his actions and saddened by Lois' rejection, Brian calls Stewie to tell him what happened.

The next morning, Lois tells Peter, and Peter confronts Brian at the hotel bar. Brian believes that Peter is not good enough for Lois, and Peter counters by saying Brian has never had a long-term relationship with any woman he has ever been with, using Jillian as an example. Their argument quickly becomes physically violent. After the fight, Brian promises never to let Lois come between them in their friendship ever again, and they forgive each other.

Later, Brian talks to Lois about his actions and she forgives him as well, though she admits she sometimes shares his feelings. Brian reveals that his essay was plagiarized from Summer of '42. Lois chooses to remain faithful to Peter; they sing "The Spirit of Massachusetts" before returning to Quahog.

During the credits, Herbert is seen sleeping in Chris' room when the Evil Monkey comes out of the closet. Upon not finding Chris in the room, the Evil Monkey goes back into the closet.

== Production ==
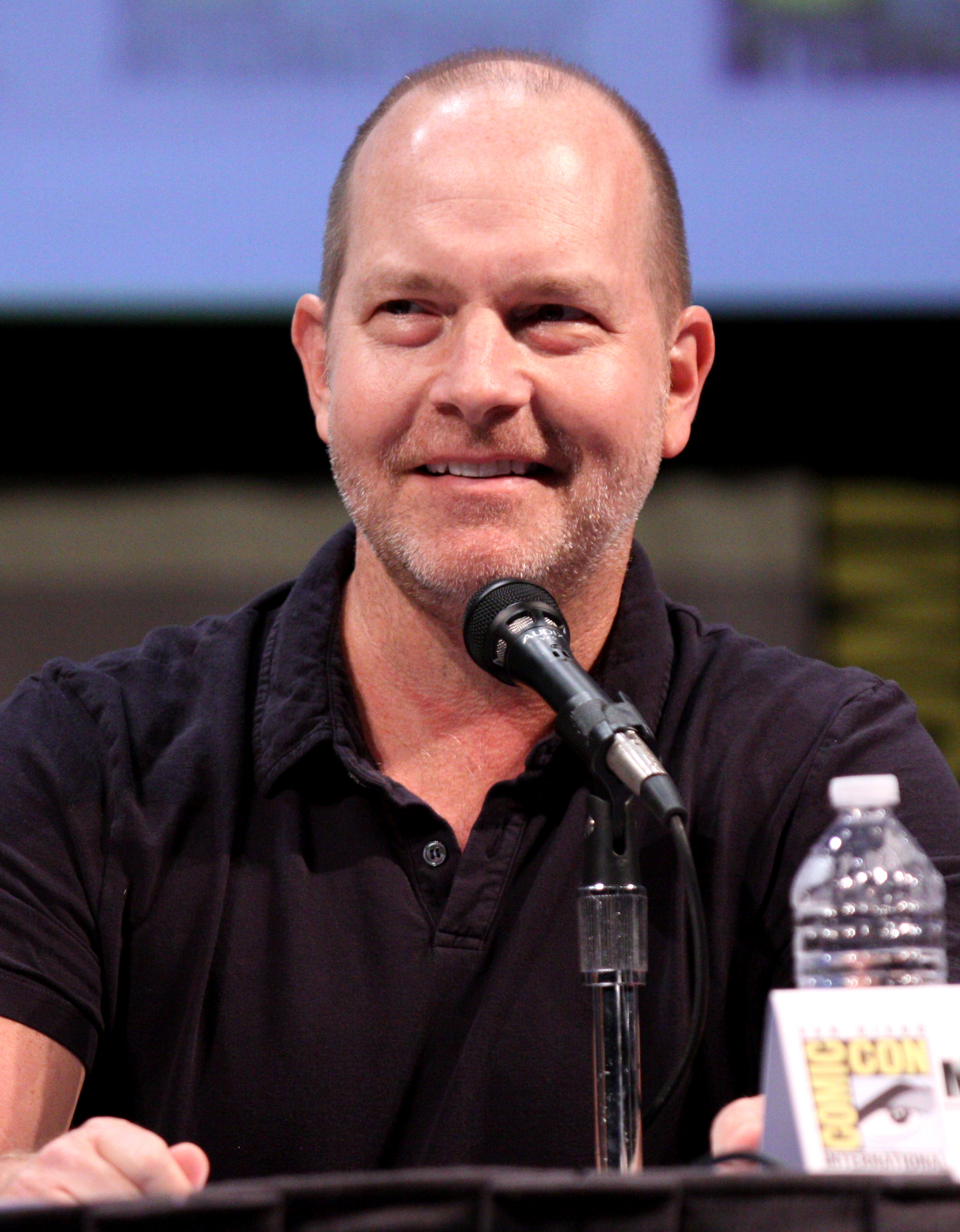
Mike Henry voices the character of Herbert.

The episode was written by the season's executive producer Danny Smith, in his first writing credit for the season. It was directed by John Holmquist, in his second directing credit for the season since he directed the episode "Stewie Kills Lois" earlier in the season. Series regulars Peter Shin and James Purdun acted as supervising directors for the episode. The episode's music was composed by Walter Murphy. The two musical numbers in the episode that aired on television were performed by show creator Seth MacFarlane, while a third musical number performed by Mike Henry as Herbert can be found on DVD releases, having been cut from the broadcast version of the episode due to time constraints.

The episode is one of the few of the show that heavily features the character of Herbert, voiced by one of the show's main voice actors, Mike Henry. The character first appeared in the episode "To Love and Die in Dixie" and since then he has been criticized for the style of humor that he brings to the show.

"Play It Again, Brian", along with the last four episodes of the sixth season and the first eight episodes of the seventh season, were released on DVD by 20th Century Fox Home Entertainment in the United States and Canada on June 16, 2009, one month after it had completed broadcast on television. The "Volume 7" DVD release features bonus material including deleted scenes, animatics, and commentaries for every episode.

Recurring voice actors Lori Alan, Bruce Lanoil, episode writer Danny Smith, writer Alec Sulkin, and writer John Viener made minor appearances. MacFarlane's sister, Rachael MacFarlane, also appeared in a minor scene.

== Cultural references ==
The episode featured various references to the general culture. The title refers to Woody Allen's play-turned-movie Play It Again, Sam, and the episode contains multiple references to the film. The song "As Time Goes By", which was featured heavily in Allen's film, can be heard in the episode sung by Seth MacFarlane. Cleveland is shown to have gone on tour with Black Box. Peter said that he was watching the sitcom Three's Company before he soiled himself while laughing. We can hear Stewie playing Scattergories with Herbert. Brian considers renting the film Vanilla Sky. Lois and Brian watch the movie Roman Holiday. Peter tells Lois that he wound up engaged to Nathan Lane at the hotel bar while the two were drunk; Lane later appears to break up the fight between Peter and Brian. Peter sings "Spirit of Massachusetts", a jingle composed for the Massachusetts state bicentennial marketing campaign in 1987, in a cutaway and at the end of the episode. Stewie references the Grateful Dead in this episode. Brian admitted to mostly plagiarizing Summer of '42 for his essay.

== Reception ==
This episode received mixed reviews. Brad Trechak of TV Squad enjoyed the episode, saying "Overall, a good episode. I particularly liked the Disney-style ending. The show itself reopened and furthered some of the slowly developing subplots of the Family Guy universe and proves that it is willing to go places that The Simpsons considers beneath them." Ahsan Haque of IGN stated that while "Play It Again, Brian" is "definitely entertaining" it "plays too much like a paint-by-numbers cheesy sitcom episode as opposed to being a creative and unique endeavor". He graded the episode 7.2 out of 10. Genevieve Koski of The A.V. Club wrote that "the gags being, as always, hit-or-miss, there wasn't enough story-based humor to maintain the momentum", but called the ending "kinda sweet, but at the same time devoid of any sentimentality whatsoever". She graded the episode B−.
