= Peter's Two Dads =

- Family Guy episode
- Peter meets his biological father, Mickey McFinnigan
- Episode no.: Season 5 Episode 10
- Directed by: Cyndi Tang
- Written by: Danny Smith
- Production code: 5ACX05
- Original air date: February 11, 2007

Guest appearances
- Dan Conroy; Charles Durning as Francis Griffin; Phyllis Diller as Thelma Griffin; Fred Tatasciore

Episode chronology
← Previous "Road to Rupert"	Next → "The Tan Aquatic with Steve Zissou"
- Family Guy season 5

"Peter's Two Dads" is the tenth episode in the fifth season of the American animated television series Family Guy. It originally aired on the Fox network in the United States on February 11, 2007. The episode was written by Danny Smith and directed by Cyndi Tang, with Greg Lovell as co-director. The plot follows Peter travelling to Ireland, along with Brian, to find his biological father, after he accidentally kills his stepfather at Meg's birthday party. Meanwhile, after Lois spanks Stewie for destroying her pearl necklace, he becomes fascinated with it and goes to great lengths to have her hit him again, but she was guilty for doing this and refuses to because doesn't want to hurt him again after making him cry.

The episode received mostly positive reviews from critics for its storyline and many cultural references. According to Nielsen ratings, it was viewed in 7.97 million homes in its original airing. The episode featured guest performances by Dan Conroy, Phyllis Diller, Charles Durning and Fred Tatasciore, along with several recurring guest voice actors for the series. It was nominated for a Primetime Emmy Award for Outstanding Original Music and Lyrics, for the episode's song entitled "Drunken Irish Dad", at the 59th Primetime Creative Arts Emmy Awards.

== Plot ==
Meg, who is turning seventeen, asks Lois and Peter if she can have a birthday party, preferably a teenager-type party with a band playing at her house. Unfortunately, neither Lois nor Peter remembers her birthday, and worse, they forgot how old she's turning. The two then offend her by throwing her a kiddie-type party, with games such as Pin the Tail on the Donkey, and reveal that they got her age wrong as they bought sixteen candles. At the party, Peter dresses up as "Pee Pants the Inebriated Hobo Clown", and tells Meg that he got her "a dozen scarves" as a gift which he then proceeds to regurgitate as one long scarf, as he has actually tied and swallowed them (which Lois warned him not to do), causing him to cough and vomit. Peter hands Meg the long scarf, regurgitates his long johns from his stomach, and then crouches in pain following the ordeal. He then gets drunk, and attempts to ride a unicycle down the staircase, but falls off and crushes his father, Francis, who later dies in the hospital from the accident, with his last dying words condemning Peter as a "fat stinking drunk".

A disappointed Peter feels Francis did not care about him, and after giving up drinking and trying crack (which Brian notes is not a good substitute), he sees a hypnotherapist (Bruce), who helps him discover that Francis was not his biological father. When Peter meets his mom, Thelma Griffin, she reveals that she had an affair with an Irish man named Mickey McFinnigan, who is Peter's biological father. Brian and Peter travel to a village in Ireland to find Mickey, who they discover is the town drunk. At first horrified, Peter finds out it is considered an honorable position in Ireland by the locals. Mickey refuses to believe that Peter is his son and mocks him.

Lamenting that he would only be able to convince Mickey of the truth if he were a "fat stinking drunk", Peter recalls Francis' last words to him and challenges Mickey to a drinking contest, which he wins. Mickey finally believes that Peter is his son, feeling that nobody but a member of his own family could beat him in a drinking contest. Peter is excited to have formed a bond with his real father, but Brian points out that while Francis may not have been Peter's real father, he did raise Peter like he was his own son, showing that deep down, Francis really did love Peter. Peter accepts this, but is still willing to have Mickey as his biological father. The three and the bar patrons sing and dance to "Drunken Irish Dad".

=== Subplot ===
After discovering Stewie opening most of Meg's presents, Lois realises he is going through the "mine" phase. She later discovers him going through her jewelry, and when she tells him to stop and take everything off he snaps a pearl necklace to pieces so she spanks him. She immediately feels guilty for hurting him when he started to cry and tries to give him a hug. He runs off in fear and tears, but quickly realises that he actually enjoyed being hit and might be "one of those people" so he goes to great lengths in order for him to get spanked again. Lois gets annoyed at his antics but, not wanting to hurt her child again, refuses to punish him despite him begging her to. When Stewie hears himself begging Lois to rub dirt in his eyes and violate him with a wine bottle, he realizes he has problems and stops.

== Production ==
This episode marks the third appearance of Francis Griffin. As of now, episode writer and series co-executive producer Danny Smith has written all Family Guy episodes to date to feature Francis when he was alive. Show creator Seth MacFarlane comments that the episode came together and played great from start to finish. Prior to the making of the episode, there had been several different ideas and disagreements for Peter's father's appearance. MacFarlane comments that he had always pictured Peter's father to be a fat, drunk leprechaun. The negativity of Francis was becoming "dull to write for", hence the storyline of Peter finding his biological father. MacFarlane also mentions not having ideas to write for Kevin, Joe Swanson's son, who was mentioned in a later episode that he died in the war of Iraq (Stew-Roids). A deleted scene showed Peter pretending to quit drinking, but continuing quietly was one of several scenes that was removed from airing as it and the others were described by the producers to be "not going anywhere."

The scene with Peter in the hypnotherapist's office was censored for television; a portion of the scene, which sees hypnotherapist Bruce discuss Peter's genitals and reproductive organs, was cut out. When Peter comes to the realization that Francis is not his real father and when Stewie dreams about being tortured by Lois, a harp sound can be heard; MacFarlane comments that even small things like that take a lot of work to produce. The alcohol bottles being pushed by the airplane that Peter and Brian are traveling on were animated by computer, as is the taxi driving along the street. On the DVD commentary, MacFarlane notes that the scene would not have looked good without computer aid. He said it makes the animations seem more realistic than without a computer. The two men circling each other for fifty years and waiting for the other to throw the first punch was not broadcast for television.

In addition to the regular cast, actor Dan Conroy, actress Phyllis Diller, actor Charles Durning, and voice actor Fred Tatasciore guest starred in the episode. Recurring guest voice actors Alex Breckenridge, Chris Cox, writer Danny Smith, writer Alec Sulkin, and writer John Viener made minor appearances.

== Cultural references ==
Stewie draws a picture of David Tua on the wall to try to get Lois to hit him. It also mocks the main character's decisions in Pet Sematary when Peter buried Francis' body at the same cemetery to resurrect him, but decided against it after Francis, as a zombie, jumped out of the grave in a jump scare, remarking "Okay, maybe I'll bury him in a regular cemetery." Peter briefly transforms into Wonder Woman after discovering his biological father is not Francis: this is a reference to Wonder Woman, and although the show could not receive rights to reproduce the original music, the scene was still broadcast. Before Peter and Brian leave to Ireland, Meg tells Peter she loves him, in which he replies, "That'll do, pig, that'll do", which is a reference to the film Babe. When Francis showed up as a ghost along with Yoda and Obi-Wan Kenobi, Hayden Christensen (who played Anakin Skywalker in the Star Wars prequel trilogy) also appears and says "And I'm Hayden Christensen!", as a reference to the ending of the 2004 remastered DVD release of Return of the Jedi. The song Chris and Herbert sing at the party and up in a tree is "Friends and Lovers" by Gloria Loring and Carl Anderson.

During the episode, Peter introduces a cutaway with Robert Loggia. In 2026, the cutaway became a popular joke on social media.

== Reception ==
In a significant decrease from the previous week, the episode was viewed in 7.97 million homes in its original airing, according to Nielsen ratings. The episode also acquired a 2.8 rating in the 18–49 demographic, being slightly edged out by The Simpsons, while still winning over American Dad!.

A reviewer from Boxxet commented that "when I checked the schedule and saw the title of this episode was 'Peter's Two Dads', I was a little torn. First, the Peter-centric episodes generally have a much higher chance of going off the rails," following on to comment that "the episode that we did see still left me with something of a mixed reaction." concluding with a positive comment that the episode "was well constructed."

IGN's Ahsan Haque noted that "despite a couple of underdeveloped plotlines and an overabundance of offensive and uncomfortable jokes, this week's episode of Family Guy somehow manages to succeed with just enough truly hilarious moments and actual story elements." MacFarlane has said that this is one of his favorite episodes, alongside "PTV" and "Road to Rhode Island."
