= Believe It or Not, Joe's Walking on Air =

- Family Guy episode
- Episode no.: Season 6 Episode 3
- Directed by: Julius Wu
- Written by: Andrew Goldberg
- Production code: 5ACX15
- Original air date: October 7, 2007

Guest appearances
- Jeff Bergman as Fred Flintstone; Jamie Farr as himself; Phil LaMarr as Portland; Wendy Raquel Robinson as Bernice/Jackée Harry; Alec Sulkin as Jack Black/Judas; Nicole Sullivan as Muriel

Episode chronology
← Previous "Movin' Out (Brian's Song)"	Next → "Stewie Kills Lois"
- Family Guy season 6

"Believe It or Not, Joe's Walking on Air" is the third episode of the sixth season of the American animated television series Family Guy. It was an episode produced for season 5. It originally aired on Fox in the United States on October 7, 2007. Joe Swanson (Patrick Warburton) gets the impression that his wife Bonnie (voiced by Jennifer Tilly) is tired of being married to a disabled person, so he decides to get a leg transplant. Excited about his new ability to walk, Joe dives head first into extreme sports and begins to hang around more active friends. Meanwhile, Peter (Seth MacFarlane) and the guys are upset at how Joe is acting and decide to teach him a lesson. In doing so, he is re-crippled, and he makes amends with his friends.

The episode was written by Andrew Goldberg and directed by Julius Wu. It received praise from critics for its storyline and many cultural references. According to Nielsen ratings, it was viewed in 8.4 million homes in its original airing. The episode featured guest performances by Jeff Bergman, Jamie Farr, Phil LaMarr, Wendy Raquel Robinson and Nicole Sullivan, along with several recurring guest voice actors for the series. This is the first episode where Meg was not seen or mentioned. Chris was only in a flashback in this episode.

== Plot ==
Peter, Cleveland, Joe and Quagmire are at the Drunken Clam, when Lois, Bernice (Cleveland's first girlfriend since his divorce with Loretta) and Bonnie show up at the bar, Peter and his friends get annoyed. Therefore, Peter suggests that they should build their own bar called "The Quahog Men's Club", which is designated for men only. It takes six weeks and $8,000 for them to build it. After building it, Lois wants Peter to get rid of it.

Many people start to show up at the Quahog's Men's Club and Lois and her friends start to get annoyed. In order to get back at them, they enter the club. Everyone dances, except for Bonnie, because her husband is disabled. Joe feels self-conscious about his disability, and decides to get surgery so that he will be able to walk again. When Joe comes out of the operation, he invites his friends to go do physical activities such as rock climbing, karate, and dance. However, Joe soon feels that the other three are holding him back, and leaves them for three new friends (named Parker, Quentin and Portland). Lois and Peter are worried about Joe, and Lois suggests that Peter should find a new friend to replace him. Meanwhile, Joe realizes that he has outgrown Bonnie and leaves her. Desperate to get their friend back, Peter, Cleveland and Quagmire try to re-cripple Joe, failing miserably until Bonnie comes along with Joe's handgun and shoots (and misses) Joe's spine. Sick of waiting in pain, Joe takes the gun and shoots himself in the spine, re-crippling himself. They all then go to the Drunken Clam where Joe apologizes to Peter, Cleveland and Quagmire for how he acted and they all forgive him.

== Production ==
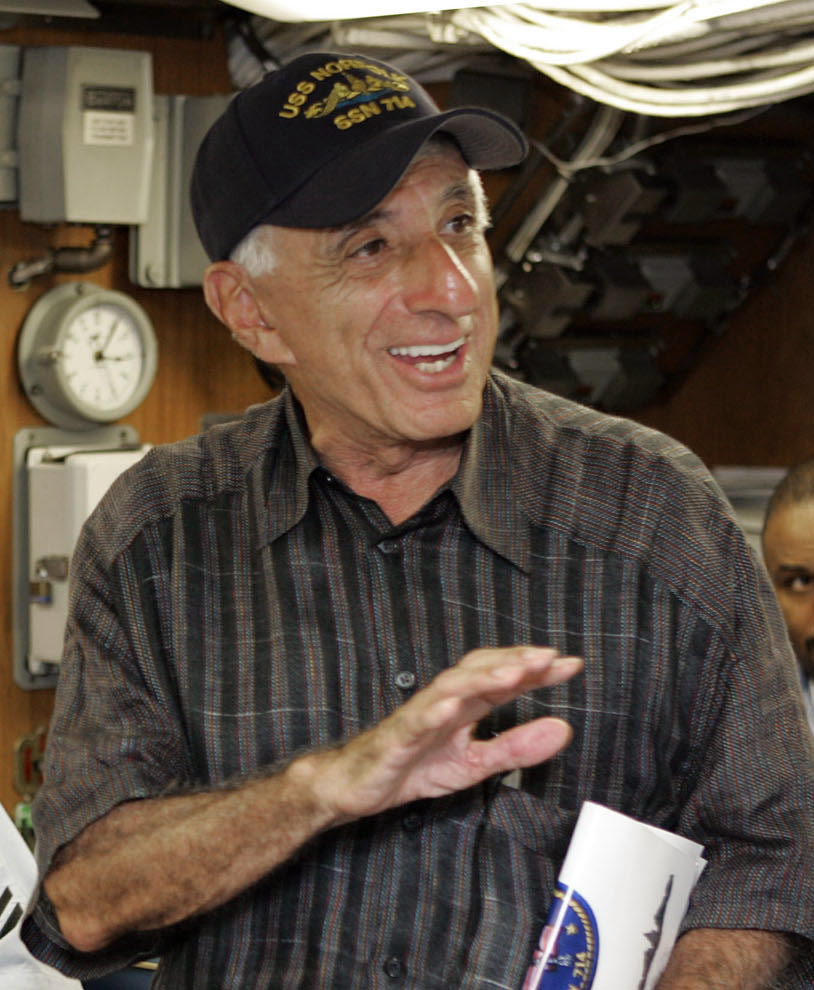
Actor Jamie Farr guest starred in the episode.

"Believe It or Not, Joe's Walking on Air" was written by Andrew Goldberg. This episode was his first time working for the show, and was a result of Goldberg being creator Seth MacFarlane's assistant. He wrote the episode, and executive producer David A. Goodman thought he did a "fantastic job". He would later go on to write the season seven episode "The Juice is Loose". The episode was directed by former Mission Hill and The Oblongs director and series veteran Julius Wu, who had been a member of the show's staff since the fifth season episode, "The Tan Aquatic with Steve Zissou". Directors Peter Shin and James Purdum acted as supervising directors.

In addition to the regular cast, actor Jeff Bergman, voice actor Phil LaMarr, actor Jamie Farr, actress Wendy Raquel Robinson, and voice actress Nicole Sullivan guest starred in the episode as Fred Flintstone, Portland, Himself, Bernice, and Muriel Goldman respectively. Recurring guest voice actors Steve Callaghan, actor Ralph Garman, writer Danny Smith, writer Alec Sulkin, and writer John Viener made minor appearances. Recurring guest cast members Adam West, Jennifer Tilly, and Patrick Warburton also made appearances.

== Cultural references ==
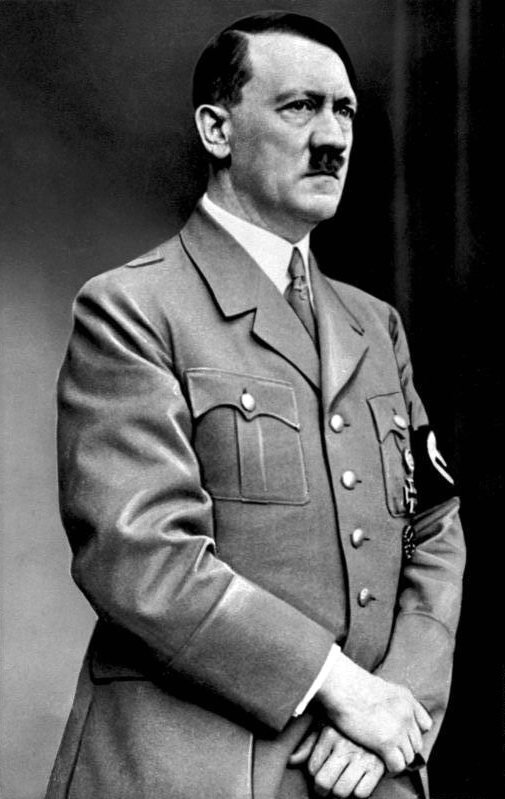
Adolf Hitler was referenced in this episode.

The episode makes several references to pop culture referencing films, music and media. Peter remembers a movie he watched with actor Jack Black in it, a (fictional) film called The Unconventional Butler. When rock climbing, Cleveland is saved from a fall by Spider-Man. Joe makes Cleveland, Quagmire and Peter sing and dance "Good Morning" from the film Singin' in the Rain. The title is based on the theme song to The Greatest American Hero titled "Theme from The Greatest American Hero (Believe It or Not)" sung by Joey Scarbury.

The episode makes references to Family Guy itself. When Bonnie, Lois and Cleveland's new girlfriend come to dance at The Drunken Clam, they state that they would like to make the bar their place to hang out and afterwards Peter grabs Joe's gun and kills himself. It turns out that this was only Peter's imagination as he snaps out of it when Joe starts talking to him; Peter answers that he was having a Scrubs fantasy moment. Quagmire responds to Peter's moment by stating that Scrubs is the best show people are not watching. Cleveland replies that he hates shows that leave the story for a gag or joke, referring to the numerous cutaways Scrubs and Family Guy contain. While in the hospital, Peter realizes that Mr. Pewterschmidt and Dr. Hartman have a similar voice, then Mr. Pewterschmidt comes into the room and they both start talking about how their voices sound alike; this is a reference to the show's creator Seth MacFarlane as he voices both characters.

The episode also makes references to history. In the following cutaway, Adolf Hitler is shown juggling three fish while riding a unicycle. After a while the same cutaway reappears, but this time Peter shows up and knocks Hitler off the unicycle and punches him in the face and breaks the fourth wall by saying "See. We had a plan for that all along". It also makes references to Christianity. When Lois suggests that Peter finds a new friend, she tells him to find a kindred spirit like Judas found in Pontius Pilate.

== Reception ==
This episode drew 8.4 million viewers on its original broadcast. Also, a repeat of the episode on the Fox network December 16, 2007 was number 29 of 94 programs listed by Nielsen Media Research, the audience measurement systems developed to determine the audience size and composition of television programming in the United States, for the week of December 10 to December 16, 2007.

The episode received positive reviews from critics. Ahsan Haque of IGN gave the episode a positive review, writing that it "brings back memories how groundbreaking and fantastic this show once was, and how great the show can be when the writers put their minds to it". He graded "Believe it Or Not, Joe's Walking On Air" 9.3 out of 10. Brad Trechak of TV Squad also praised the episode, stating "Family Guy is starting to stick to what it does best", though he called the ending "somewhat predictable". Genevieve Koski of The A.V. Club wrote that the episode had "a fairly interesting storyline", but she was distracted by the absence of Joe's son, Kevin. She graded "Believe it Or Not, Joe's Walking On Air" B.

In contrast, Robert Pierson from the TV Critic gave the episode a negative review criticizing the episode's self-referential humor and the fact that the characters would be so selfish that they would cripple their own friend, he stated that the scene where Peter and the others attack Joe made him "dislike the show because there is nothing funny, positive or entertaining about it", he ended his review by saying that the episode's humor is "evidence of a writing team which is too lazy and incompetent to write good humour".
