= Family Guy season 6 =

Season of television series

Family Guy
- Season 6
- DVD covers for Volumes 6 and 7
- Showrunners: David A. Goodman; Chris Sheridan
- Starring: Seth MacFarlane; Alex Borstein; Seth Green; Mila Kunis; Mike Henry
- No. of episodes: 12

Release
- Original network: Fox
- Original release: September 23, 2007 – May 4, 2008

Season chronology
- ← Previous; Season 5 Next → Season 7

The sixth season of Family Guy first aired on Fox from September 23, 2007, to May 4, 2008. The season included 12 episodes and was shortened due to creator Seth MacFarlane's participation in the 2007–2008 Writers Guild of America strike, which resulted in Fox airing episodes without MacFarlane doing the final work. The episode "Lois Kills Stewie" was the last episode completed before the strike. When the strike ended in February 2008, Fox had already aired three episodes without any input from MacFarlane.

Episodes 2–8 of the sixth season are included on the Volume 6 DVD, which was released on October 21, 2008, and episodes 9–12 are included on the Volume 7 DVD, which was released on June 16, 2009. The season aired in the UK from May 4, 2008 – June 15, 2008 on BBC Three.

The executive producers for the sixth production season are Seth MacFarlane, David A. Goodman, Chris Sheridan and Danny Smith. Despite this being the show's sixth television season, only four episodes from the sixth production season were aired as part of it, with the remainder being held off for seasons seven and eight as a result of the WGA strike. Goodman and Sheridan continued to serve as showrunners.

== Voice cast and characters ==
- Seth MacFarlane as Peter Griffin, Brian Griffin, Stewie Griffin, Glenn Quagmire, Tom Tucker, Carter Pewterschmidt, Stan Smith
- Alex Borstein as Lois Griffin, Babs Pewterschmidt, Tricia Takanawa, Elle Hitler
- Seth Green as Chris Griffin
- Mila Kunis as Meg Griffin
- Mike Henry as Cleveland Brown, John Herbert, Bruce, Consuela

=== Supporting characters ===
- H. Jon Benjamin as Carl
- Johnny Brennan as Mort Goldman
- Carrie Fisher as Angela
- Phil LaMarr as Judge
- Jennifer Tilly as Bonnie Swanson
- Patrick Warburton as Joe Swanson
- Adam West as Mayor Adam West
- Lori Alan as Diane Simmons

=== Guest Star Characters ===
- Patrick Stewart as Avery Bullock

== Episodes ==
No. overall	No. in season	Title	Directed by	Written by	Original release date	Prod. code	U.S. viewers (millions)
99	1	"Blue Harvest"	Dominic Polcino	Alec Sulkin	September 23, 2007	5ACX16	10.81
99	1	"Blue Harvest"	Dominic Polcino	Alec Sulkin	September 23, 2007	5ACX22	10.81
When the power goes out in the Griffin home, Peter decides to educate his family and pass along the greatest story ever told: the story of Star Wars! After Princess Leia (Lois) comes under siege by Darth Vader (Stewie) and his evil Storm Troopers, C-3PO (Quagmire) and R2-D2 (Cleveland) escape to find the only person who can help the Rebel Alliance. On their quest thorough the desert planet of Tatooine, C-3PO and R-2D2 find extra help in Obi-Wan Kenobi (Herbert), Luke Skywalker (Chris), Han Solo (Peter) and Chewbacca (Brian) and head back to battle the Death Star in an epic intergalactic fight to the death.
100	2	"Movin' Out (Brian's Song)"	Cyndi Tang	John Viener	September 30, 2007	5ACX14	7.98
When Peter convinces Brian to get an apartment with his dense girlfriend Jillian, he is angry at first but soon becomes happy living with her, only to realize he needs to pay the rent, so he allows Stewie to move in with them so he can help pay. But his place in the apartment interferes with their happiness, and a bitter argument results in Brian and Jillian officially breaking up. Meanwhile, Meg gets a job at the local convenience store, as does Chris, who gets chummy with the manager Carl and is given a large promotion originally promised to Meg. She eventually stands up for herself, resulting in her termination, and Lois convinces Chris to help his sister get her job back.
101	3	"Believe It or Not, Joe's Walking on Air"	Julius Wu	Andrew Goldberg	October 7, 2007	5ACX15	8.30
Tired of being handicapped, Joe decides to get a leg transplant so he can walk again. After the successful operation and excited about his new ability to walk, Joe dives head first into extreme sports, where he soon outgrows his friends and ditches them to hang out with jocks. Peter and his pals are upset by this, and become shocked when Joe's new lifestyle eventually leads him to leave Bonnie. Peter suggests to Cleveland and Quagmire that in order to get their friend back they must paralyze him once again.
102	4	"Stewie Kills Lois"	John Holmquist	David A. Goodman	November 4, 2007	5ACX17	10.46
Lois and Peter go on a cruise, leaving Stewie and the family behind. Upset with Lois for leaving him at home, Stewie vows to carry out a diabolical plan. When Brian challenges him to actually do it, Stewie stows away on the ship, finds Lois and shoots her, seemingly killing her and resulting in Peter being blamed for her murder.
103	5	"Lois Kills Stewie"	Greg Colton	Steve Callaghan	November 11, 2007	5ACX18	10.39
Just as Lois was presumed dead by Peter's hand, with Peter about to be jailed for life, she makes a miraculous return from the wilderness and names Stewie as her killer. From there, Stewie escapes the law, where he ties up the family and reveals his true nature. He forces Brian into helping him fulfill his lifelong goal of taking over the world, and succeeds when Stan Smith and the CIA submit to his threats. After suffering several days under Stewie's reign, Lois decides she has no choice but to arm herself to kill Stewie and save the world.
104	6	"Padre de Familia"	Pete Michels	Kirker Butler	November 18, 2007	5ACX20	10.55
Peter starts an anti-immigration group after being caught up in the pro-American sentiment at a Veterans' Day parade, but his tune quickly changes when he finds out he was born in Mexico. Unable to prove his citizenship, pass the naturalization test or convince investigators that his marriage to Lois is for real, he ends up working as a groundskeeper on his father-in-law's estate and leading the fight for immigrant rights.
105	7	"Peter's Daughter"	Zac Moncrief	Chris Sheridan	November 25, 2007	5ACX21	9.52
When a flood hits Quahog, Meg winds up in the hospital in a coma, but she wakes up to a cute med student named Michael and they immediately hit it off. After Meg recovers, Peter is very protective of her, so he drives Michael away, but eventually allows them to date. Michael leaves Meg after they discover Peter spying on them. But when Meg reveals to the family that she is pregnant, Peter forces them to marry, but things change when she discovers she is not in fact pregnant. Meanwhile, Stewie and Brian undertake to renovate a house wrecked during the floods, hoping to sell it for a profit, but the plan fails. Note: This episode was dedicated to Paul B. Sheridan father of writer Chris Sheridan.
106	8	"McStroke"	Brian Iles	Wellesley Wild	January 13, 2008	5ACX19	11.33
Peter decides to grow a mustache, but then he's mistaken for a fireman (because they all have mustaches), so he lends a hand when a fire breaks out at a local fast food restaurant. The owner gives him unlimited burgers as a "thank you" but he eats so many that he eventually has a stroke that paralyzed the left half of his body. When Peter recovers, he vows to expose the fast-food company and becomes friends with a genetically engineered cow he meets after infiltrating the McBurgertown warehouse.
107	9	"Back to the Woods"	Brian Iles	Tom Devanney	February 17, 2008	6ACX02	7.29
James Woods returns after being locked in a crate to seek revenge against Peter by stealing his identity and by law takes over as head of the Griffin household and forces Peter off his own property. To reunite with his family and save them from James' abuse and manipulation, Peter decides to steal his identity and pose as him, where he offends the country to obliterate his career and image.
108	10	"Play It Again, Brian"	John Holmquist	Danny Smith	March 2, 2008	6ACX01	7.80
Peter and Lois's marriage is on the rocks, but when Brian wins the New England Rising Writer's award, the three of them head to Martha's Vineyard for a relaxing vacation. As Peter's drinking spirals out of control, so does Brian's self-restraint as he professes his undying love for Lois, putting Peter and Brian in a serious feud that will test their friendship and determine the fate of the Griffins.
109	11	"The Former Life of Brian"	Pete Michels	Steve Callaghan	April 27, 2008	6ACX04	8.42
When Brian is afraid that he has lost his chance at love, he goes in search of a former flame Tracy only to discover he is the father of her unruly son, Dylan. After Brian's surprise visit, Tracy drops Dylan off at the Griffins' so Brian can raise him. Subsequently, his new little angel begins terrorizing the Griffin household and Brian's self-important attitude toward parenting infuriates Peter and Lois.
110	12	"Long John Peter"	Dominic Polcino	Wellesley Wild	May 4, 2008	6ACX06	7.69
It's a pirate's life for Peter when he gets a pet parrot. But after raising hell in Quahog and terrorizing the neighbors, Peter accidentally kills his beloved pet. Meanwhile, Chris takes Brian to the local vet, where an intern named Ana falls for him.

== Production ==
In November 2007, Variety reported that creator Seth MacFarlane had joined the 2007–2008 Writers Guild of America strike and refused to complete more Family Guy episodes. A spokesperson for Fox said: "Our hope is that he returns to work and completes his non-writing obligations on those episodes". IGN reported that Fox would air three episodes of Family Guy without MacFarlane doing the final work. MacFarlane noted that Fox could legally do that, but he thought it was a "colossal dick move", and said that "They've never done anything like this before [...] It's really going to be unfortunate and damaging to our relationship if they do it."

Fox aired two new episodes during November 2007. The production of the episodes started but was not completed before the strike. "Padre de Familia" was the first episode of these two episodes to air and "Peter's Daughter" was the second. The strike ended on February 12, 2008, and the series resumed airing regularly.
