= Long John Peter =

- Family Guy episode
- Episode no.: Season 6 Episode 12
- Directed by: Dominic Polcino
- Written by: Wellesley Wild
- Production code: 6ACX06
- Original air date: May 4, 2008

Guest appearances
- Amanda Bynes as Anna; Bryan Cranston as Dr. Jewish; Mae Whitman

Episode chronology
← Previous "The Former Life of Brian"	Next → "Love, Blactually"
- Family Guy season 6

"Long John Peter" is the twelfth episode and season finale of the sixth season of the American animated television series Family Guy, and the 110th episode overall. It originally aired on the Fox network in the United States on May 4, 2008. Written by Wellesley Wild and directed by Dominic Polcino, "Long John Peter" served as the final episode of the season, which was cut short in early May 2008 due to creator Seth MacFarlane's participation in the 2007–2008 Writers Guild of America strike.

In the episode, Peter steals a parrot from the vet and becomes convinced that he is a pirate. He becomes the scourge of the neighborhood, terrorizing every corner of Quahog until he accidentally kills his beloved bird. Meanwhile, Chris falls in love with the lovely vet intern Anna and turns to Peter for some advice.

"Long John Peter" was watched by 7.68 million viewers in its original broadcast, according to the Nielsen ratings. Actress Amanda Bynes guest-starred as Anna, and Bryan Cranston and Mae Whitman made minor appearances in the episode. "Long John Peter" received generally positive reviews from critics, and was praised for its action sequence featuring Peter and a British man having a pirate fight on their cars.

== Plot ==
The Griffin family are waiting for the examination results of Brian at the veterinary office of Dr. Jewish, as Brian had apparently had stomach pains prior to the events in the episode. Brian had eaten one of Stewie's used diapers—which he claimed that he had mistaken for Indian cuisine. Chris spots a beautiful young intern named Anna and falls in love with her. While there, Peter finds a parrot and decides to keep it, leaving a dog wearing a top hat and a mustache in its place. Peter names the parrot "Adrien Beaky" and begins taking it everywhere he goes, showing it off to his friends, Quagmire, Cleveland, and Joe, who, in turn, begin making suggestions as to how Peter could change his appearance to seem more "pirate-like" because of the resemblance between Peter and a pirate, who are known for keeping parrots as pets. Peter takes the advice of his friends by dressing up in pirate clothing, gathering up a crew of other "pirates", and going by the name "Long John Peter". Peter begins taking the pirate act to the extreme, even robbing a British man's car filled with sugarcane, tobacco, and spices. Although Peter and his crew win the "battle" for the spices, Adrien Beaky is gravely injured, and eventually dies.

Meanwhile, at the vet where Dr. Jewish breaks the bad news about Peter's dead parrot, Chris and Anna hook up and begin dating. The relationship goes smoothly until Peter tells off Chris for treating her too well. Peter tells him that women like bad boys, so Chris calls Anna a "bitch" on their next date and throws her movie ticket on the ground, thinking that will improve the relationship. Instead, she breaks up with him. After hearing what had happened, a furious Lois yells at Peter for ruining their son's relationship, but he fails to comfort Chris when he gives him a bullfrog he caught, which died when he poked holes on its back "so it could breathe". Lois then tells Chris that the only person he should turn to in this situation is himself, so Chris beats Brian with a chair as an excuse to return to the vet, sees Anna there, and apologizes to her. She quickly forgives Chris and they renew their relationship, while Brian collapses to the floor in pain. Brian asks for help but Stewie comes in and kicks Brian in his stomach, before leaving him there.

== Production and cultural references ==
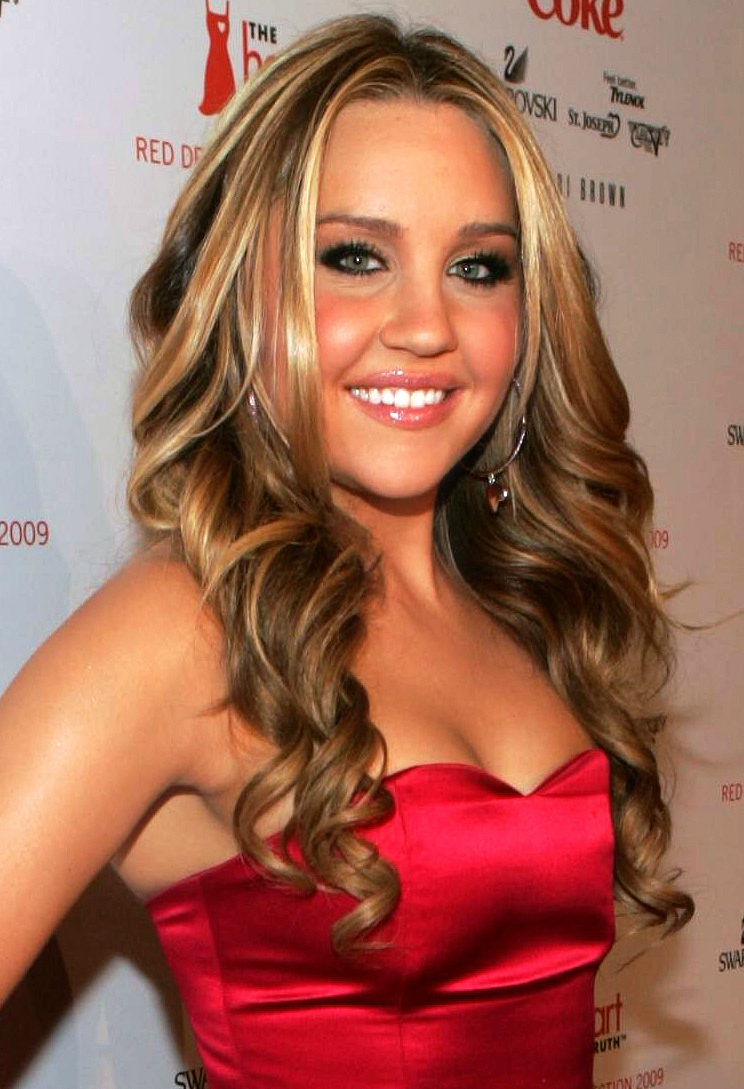
Amanda Bynes guest starred as Anna.

"Long John Peter" was written by Wellesley Wild and directed by Dominic Polcino. According to consulting producer Tom Devanney, Wild came up with the pirate story when he had been out of work for four weeks. Creator Seth MacFarlane pitched the structure of the Chris and Peter story, which is, according to executive producer David A. Goodman, the same story as in MacFarlane's pilot The Life of Larry. Actress Amanda Bynes guest starred as Chris's love interest Anna, and Goodman praised her performance.

In addition to Bynes and the regular cast, actor Bryan Cranston and actress Mae Whitman guest starred in the episode. Recurring guest voice actor John G. Brennan, writer Chris Sheridan, writer Danny Smith, writer Alec Sulkin, actress Jennifer Tilly, and writer John Viener made minor appearances. Actors Patrick Warburton and Adam West guest starred in the episode as well.

"Long John Peter" contained several pop culture references. When Chris sees Anna for the first time, he starts singing the song "Crazy for You", which was originally performed by Madonna in the film Vision Quest (1985). Peter names his parrot "Adrien Beaky", a reference to actor Adrien Brody. When Peter is fighting a British man, the title music from The Sea Hawk (1940), composed by Erich Wolfgang Korngold, is used. The episode imagines what it would be like if Michael J. Fox, who has Parkinson's disease, would star as Zorro. In a trailer for a film, the tune from Coldplay's "Clocks" is played.

== Reception ==
In its original broadcast on May 4, 2008, "Long John Peter" was watched by 7.68 million people, according to the Nielsen ratings. The episode finished second in its timeslot, after ABC's Desperate Housewives. "Long John Peter" acquired a 3.9 rating/10 share in the 18–49 demographic, and a 4.7 rating/7 share in the 18–34 demographic. The episode dropped in 9% from the previous episode, "The Former Life of Brian", which received a 4.3 rating in the 18–49 demographic and a viewership of 8.42 million.

Since airing, "Long John Peter" has received generally positive reviews from television sources and critics. Ahsan Haque of IGN wrote that "Long John Peter" was "thoroughly entertaining from start to finish, and is a great way to end this short season on a high note." He praised the action sequence, calling it "truly inspired" and "extremely well scripted", and graded the episode 8.9 out of 10. Brad Trechak of TV Squad stated that "the pirate segment of the episode wasn't very good and seemed out of place", though he also praised the action scene. He enjoyed the plot line about Chris and Anna, and called the episode "a high note". Genevieve Koski of The A.V. Club wrote that "the pirate gag was fine enough, in that it resulted in an amusing land-battle sequence" and "Chris' storyline resulted in some of the best Family Guy laughs I've had in a while". She graded the episode A−.
