= Cyndi Tang =

American animation director

- Occupation: Director
- Years active: 1991–present

Cyndi Tang-Loveland is an American animation director. She has directed several episodes of the animated series Family Guy and King of the Hill.

Tang has also served as an assistant director and as an animator on The Simpsons and The Critic, respectively.

== Family Guy ==
Tang joined Family Guy in 2001 until 2002, and returned in 2006. She has since directed multiple episodes, including "The Juice Is Loose!", "Love Blactually", "Movin' Out (Brian's Song)", "Peter's Two Dads", "Saving Private Brian", "Patriot Games", "Stuck Together, Torn Apart", "Mr. Saturday Knight", "Spies Reminiscent of Us", and "Dial Meg for Murder".
