= The Cleveland–Loretta Quagmire =

- Family Guy episode
- Episode no.: Season 4 Episode 5
- Directed by: James Purdum
- Written by: Patrick Henry; Mike Henry
- Production code: 4ACX08
- Original air date: June 12, 2005

Guest appearances
- Jane Carr as Endora; Randy Crenshaw as Barbershop Quarter Singer; Miriam Flynn as Samantha; Denis Martell as Santos; Fred Tatasciore as Randy Savage; John Viener as Non

Episode chronology
← Previous "Don’t Make Me Over"	Next → "Petarded"
- Family Guy season 4

"The Cleveland–Loretta Quagmire" is the fifth episode of the fourth season of the American animated television series Family Guy. The episode aired on Fox on June 12, 2005. This episode marks the final appearance of Loretta, Cleveland's wife, until the season 7 episode, "Love, Blactually". In the episode, Loretta cheats on Cleveland with Quagmire, due to her husband's "lack of passion" and "not being a real man". With Cleveland separating from Loretta, this episode lays much of the foundation for The Cleveland Show. The episode features guest performances from Jane Carr, Randy Crenshaw, Miriam Flynn, Denis Martell and Fred Tatasciore, as well as several recurring guest performers for the series.

== Plot ==
Peter invites his friends on his fishing boat for a party at sea. While Quagmire is fishing, he catches a fish that lands between Loretta's breasts. She invites him to reach in and grab it, which after a moment of hesitation he does. While Quagmire's hand is between her breasts, Cleveland approaches and mentions the snacks Peter has supplied, serenely saying hello to Quagmire before walking away.

Upon hearing Loretta scream at her house, Peter and Brian quickly check and see her having sex on the couch with another man which they do not realize is Quagmire, as they only see the back of his body with a tattoo of a phone number on his buttocks. They tell anyone they meet about Loretta's adultery, which makes Quagmire nervous and afraid that Cleveland may find out. Peter then tells Cleveland at the Drunken Clam what he and Brian saw in an obnoxious manner, but Cleveland seems indifferent. When he confronts Loretta about it, she angrily states it was because she needed passion and that he was not "acting like a real man". Cleveland apologizes for his actions, but Loretta sees him as pathetic for doing so and kicks him out of their house. As Cleveland stays over at the Griffin house, Peter and Brian visit Quagmire for help on finding the man who slept with Loretta, but realize that it was him after seeing the same tattoo from before. Despite the two telling Cleveland who it was exactly, he remains indifferent by the revelation.

Lois tells Cleveland that Loretta wants him to express his feelings: that women sometimes want men to be strong and stand up for them. Peter then tries to get his friend to feel some passion by taking him to a wrestling match featuring Randy Savage, but it fails to work. He then puts on a Quagmire mask and wrestles with Brian, who is unwillingly wearing a Loretta mask, on the ground. This method finally yields results: Cleveland becomes angry and vows to attack Quagmire.

Peter realizes that his plan has worked too well and tries to protect Quagmire by hiding him at Mayor West's mansion. West's lunacy soon proves too much even for Quagmire and he returns home and calls Cleveland to apologize. Cleveland appears and chases Quagmire around his house wielding a baseball bat. Despite finally having Quagmire cowering and at his mercy, Cleveland realizes that he is unable to hurt another living person, no matter how badly they have hurt him and Quagmire apologizes to Cleveland for sleeping with Loretta. After Peter brings Loretta over, she and Cleveland angrily agree to divorce, with the latter asserting that he deserves better.

Sometime afterwards at Quagmire's place, he and Cleveland decide to repair their broken friendship through a friendly sparring match in boxing.

== Production ==
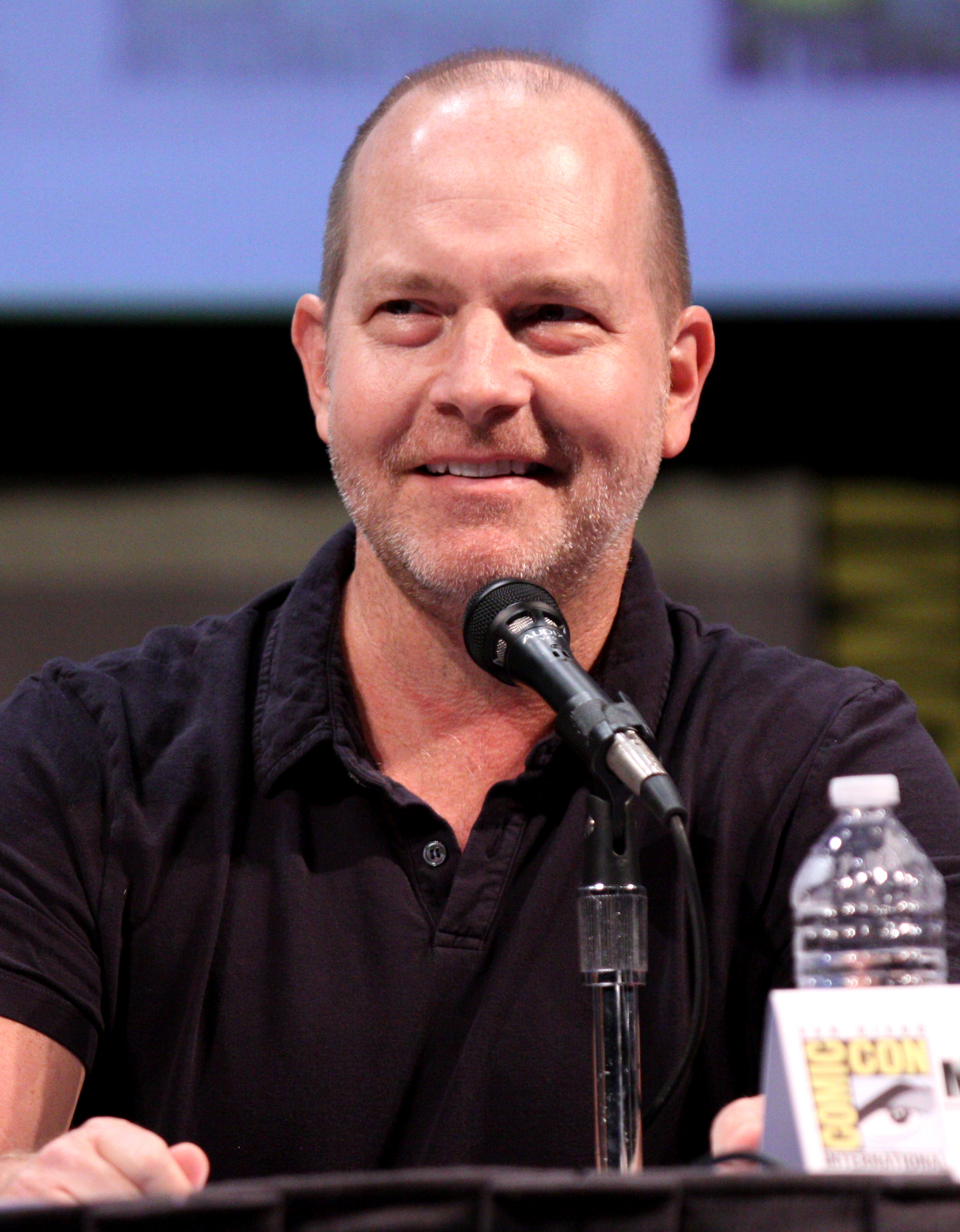
Mike Henry wrote the episode, along with his brother, Patrick.

This episode was written by Mike Henry and his brother, Patrick Henry, and directed by former Futurama director James Purdum during the course of the fourth production season. According to the DVD commentary for this episode, Loretta was written out of Family Guy because her voice actor, Alex Borstein (who also voices Lois and other female characters), was apparently tired of voicing Loretta. However, Loretta would later appear one last time in Season 7's "Love, Blactually" before being killed off in The Cleveland Show.

In addition to the regular cast, actress Jane Carr, singer Randy Crenshaw, actress Miriam Flynn, voice actor Denis Martell and voice actor Fred Tatasciore guest starred in the episode. Recurring guest voice actors Ralph Garman, writer David A. Goodman, writer Danny Smith, actress Jennifer Tilly, and writer John Viener made minor performances in the episode. Recurring guest cast members Mike Henry, Patrick Warburton, and Adam West also appeared in the episode, portraying the characters of Cleveland Brown, Joe Swanson, and Mayor West respectively.

== Cultural references ==
- Peter sings the song "Rock Lobster" by The B-52's to Cleveland in this episode.
- While the adults play charades on the ship, Joe does the death of Natalie Wood.
- A cutaway shows Peter repainting the famous Sistine Chapel, with a portrait of actor/wrestler André the Giant, a reference to the Andre the Giant Has a Posse street art campaign. He explains that this "would be a little hipper...[to] bring back...those boys you scared away," a reference to the Roman Catholic Church sex abuse scandal.
- While at the CPR teaching session, Peter says the CPR dummy is "hard, jagged and tastes like alcohol; just like kissing Faye Dunaway".
- When Brian hears Loretta screaming, Peter seems to fail to understand what has happened. Brian tries to explain that it sounded like someone was screaming, to which Peter replies with "Trouble at the old mill?" This is a reference to Lassie and the innumerable dangers to which Lassie alerted people.
- Quagmire's "My Fellow Americans" cutaway is a reference to the Lewinsky scandal, which involved Bill Clinton having sexual relations with his intern. Quagmire resembles President Clinton during that scene.
- The transition scene from Peter's house to Quagmire's house when Peter decides to talk to him about a revenge lay is a parody of the transition scenes from the original Transformers cartoon series, with the Autobot and Decepticon symbols being replaced with Peter and Quagmire's faces.
- The scene where Cleveland finally learns to get angry at Loretta's infidelity causes him to pull out a can of spinach, squeezing the contents out and swallowing it, then blowing steam out of his ears. This is a direct reference to the old Popeye cartoon shorts; the theme song for the spinach-eating sequences is also used.
- During the scene where Cleveland and Stewie are watching Bewitched on television the line 'Power of Christ' is mentioned. This is a reference to the 1973 horror film The Exorcist in which the line is repeated by Father Merrin and Father Karras during the famous Exorcism scene.
- When Peter wants to quickly move out, he screams "to the Petercopter" and enters a helicopter reminiscent of Budgie the Little Helicopter. Later in a similar scene Peter screams "to the Hindenpeter", referring to the Hindenburg airship. As soon as the zeppelin moves out of view, it crashes with a big explosion into Joe's house, referring to the Hindenburg disaster of 1937.
- In a cutaway, Quagmire and Cleveland imitate the Festrunk brothers, the two wild and crazy guys” from the 1970s Saturday Night Live episodes. Peter appears dressed as Beldar from the Coneheads, another of Aykroyd's SNL characters from that era.
- Palpatine, from Star Wars, urges Cleveland to "let the hate flow through" him, which he says to Luke Skywalker in Return of the Jedi. Lois then proceeds to push him out of the frame.
- This episode has three references to the Rocky film series. The first is when Cleveland is doing pull-ups in the front doorway of the Griffin home, and trainer Mickey Goldmill appears and exclaims, "He's a wreckin' machine!!" The second is at the end when Cleveland and Quagmire are starting a friendly boxing match. The third is the song "Eye of the Tiger" by Survivor, which plays just before the closing credits.

== Reception ==
With Fox in second place among adults 18 to 49 years old, this episode gained a total of 8.35 million viewers. Kim Voynar of TV Squad wrote a favorable review, saying "This episode of Family Guy was just chock-full of the tasteless and tacky moments that make the show so popular."

The "You Have AIDS" sequence, in which Peter and a barbershop quartet dance, in musical revue fashion, around the bed of a man with end-stage AIDS, delivering the patient's diagnosis in song, drew protests from several AIDS service organizations.
