= Stewie Kills Lois and Lois Kills Stewie =

"Stewie Kills Lois" and "Lois Kills Stewie"
- Family Guy episodes
- Promotional poster of the two episodes.
- Episode nos.: Season 6 Episodes 4/5
- Directed by: John Holmquist ("Stewie Kills Lois"); Greg Colton ("Lois Kills Stewie")
- Written by: David A. Goodman ("Stewie Kills Lois"); Steve Callaghan ("Lois Kills Stewie")
- Production code: 5ACX17/5ACX18
- Original air dates: November 4, 2007 ("Stewie Kills Lois"); November 11, 2007 ("Lois Kills Stewie")

Guest appearances
- Patrick Stewart as Avery Bullock; Paula Abdul as herself; Randy Jackson as himself; Simon Cowell as himself

Episode chronology
← Previous "Believe It or Not, Joe's Walking on Air"	Next → "Padre de Familia"
- Family Guy season 6

"Stewie Kills Lois" and "Lois Kills Stewie" is a two-part episode of the sixth season of the animated comedy series Family Guy, which was originally produced for the end of the fifth season. Respectively, both parts are the fourth and fifth episode of their season, and they premiered in the United States on Fox on November 4 and 11, 2007. In the former, housewife Lois receives cruise tickets as a birthday present from anthropomorphic dog Brian, and invites her husband, Peter, on the cruise with her. This upsets Stewie, and he ultimately appears to murder Lois while she is on the cruise, only to find out that she had survived the attack as the year passes. In the latter, Lois is able to expose Stewie as the villain that he is, but he soon accomplishes his dream of world domination.

"Stewie Kills Lois" was written by David A. Goodman and directed by John Holmquist, while "Lois Kills Stewie" was written by Steve Callaghan and directed by Greg Colton. Both episodes received relatively positive reviews for their combined story arc and cultural references. "Lois Kills Stewie" featured appearances by Patrick Stewart, Paula Abdul, Randy Jackson and Simon Cowell and both episodes featured cameos by various recurring voice actors for the series.

== Plot ==
=== "Stewie Kills Lois" ===
On Lois' birthday, Brian gives her a pair of cruise tickets with the intention of going with her. She invites Peter instead, disappointing Brian. Stewie is also upset at not being invited on the cruise simply for being the baby, and he concocts a plan to embarrass Lois upon her return. Brian points out that Stewie has never followed through with any of his plans to hurt Lois. Stewie, disappointed in himself for being "all talk", resolves to prove Brian wrong. Meanwhile, on the cruise, Peter proves to be a frequent source of humiliation for Lois, defecating on the poop deck and telling the story of how he and Lois almost aborted Meg to the ship's captain at dinner. Furious at Peter, Lois walks onto the deck to get away from him, but is confronted by Stewie, who has traveled to the ship via speedboat. Stewie opens fire on Lois with a submachine gun, sending her overboard and apparently killing her. Six days later, Joe informs Peter that he has called off the search for Lois since he and his police squad are unable to find her.

Throughout the next year, Peter begins dating women again (including a cancer patient, a stick figure, and even Bonnie) but talks Joe into posing as Lois occasionally so that her death does not emotionally scar Chris. When Stewie indirectly reveals to Brian that he killed Lois, a disturbed and enraged Brian vows to avenge Lois' death by exposing Stewie, who then disposes of his gun and drawings depicting Lois being killed to hide the evidence of his crime. After Peter nonchalantly reveals that Lois' life insurance policy, which was made on the cruise right after she and Peter had an argument stating they wanted to kill each other, has recently been cashed for a large amount of money, Joe, Quagmire, and Cleveland begin to suspect Peter as Lois' killer. They search the Griffins' garbage and find Stewie's discarded gun and drawings. Joe becomes convinced that Peter was the one who killed Lois, given that Stewie and Peter have similar handwriting.

Peter is arrested and goes on trial for Lois' murder. Carter commits perjury under the authorities' noses by falsely testifying against Peter while paying a prostitute for his taped re-enactment. Peter is close to receiving life in prison. However, Lois suddenly appears in the courtroom and reveals that Stewie, not Peter, tried to kill her.

=== "Lois Kills Stewie" ===
Everyone in the courtroom is in disbelief that Stewie would try to murder Lois, but she insists that he is evil, and explains what happened to her a year earlier: after falling overboard, she was rescued by a reverse merman. Having developed retrograde amnesia, she started working at a fat camp in North Carolina. While at a diner, she met a man who quickly became her boyfriend. However, he turned out to be a white supremacist. While at a rally, she spoke out against them and took a blow to the head, regaining her memory, at which point she returned to Quahog.

Stewie escapes the courthouse and evades the police force searching for him. He ties up his family when they return home, murders Cleveland when he drops by, and kidnaps Brian, forcing him to drive him to the CIA in Langley Falls, Virginia. Peter does a game with the family where they make up a bogus rumor and will spread it when they get out as he makes one up about Rob Schneider paying migrant workers from Home Depot to come to his house and choke him in the shower. Chris, who was the only one not tied up by Stewie, helps his family escape, and they discover Stewie's armory, where Peter and Lois unintentionally switch bodies briefly, which Peter enjoys due to having Lois' breasts.

Upon arrival at the CIA, Stewie gains access to a supercomputer and takes control of the global power grid. The CIA submits to his demands, and Stewie becomes "President of the World" after encountering Stan Smith and Avery Bullock from American Dad! (immediately mistaking the former as Joe due to their similar facial structure). Tom Tucker and Diane Simmons film Stewie's broadcast which is seen by the Griffins, Quagmire, Joe Swanson and Bonnie, and Mayor Adam West while the migrant workers from Home Depot are told by Rob Schneider to get into the shower.

Upon his rise to power, Stewie implements harsh, cruel and unusual laws and policies, including banning direct-to-video Disney films, requiring everyone to throw apples at Peter, making sexual intercourse illegal and punishable by death (Quagmire turns to origami), requiring all milk to be sourced from Hilary Swank's breasts, and creating concentration camps holding people imprisoned for ridiculous crimes (in the DVD version, he sings a version of "I've Got a Little List" from The Mikado). Unable to stand idly by as her son terrorizes the world, Lois takes weapons from Stewie's own weapons vault and engages him in a destructive battle in the Oval Office. Lois eventually gains the upper hand and prepares to kill Stewie but cannot bring herself to murder her own child. Stewie takes the opportunity to kill her, but before he can, he is shot to death by Peter (who uses a one-liner from Lethal Weapon 2 which Brian comments did not fit the context of the situation).

Brian enters Stewie's room with postcards from Peter and Lois enjoying their cruise, only to find Stewie emerging from a computer simulation device he had built to see what would happen if he killed Lois and took over the world, and he concludes that, for the time being, he is not yet ready for that, causing Brian to wonder if the events of the episode were ultimately a "dream sequence" which could essentially be a giant middle finger to hypothetical external viewers. Skeptical of Stewie's defense that the audience would have enjoyed it, Brian points out that the assumption would spark a lot of backlash, but Stewie counters by saying that at least the simulation did not end like the final episode of The Sopranos, where "it just cut to black in mid-sentence." However, the scene cuts to black before Stewie can fully enunciate the word "sentence".

== Production ==
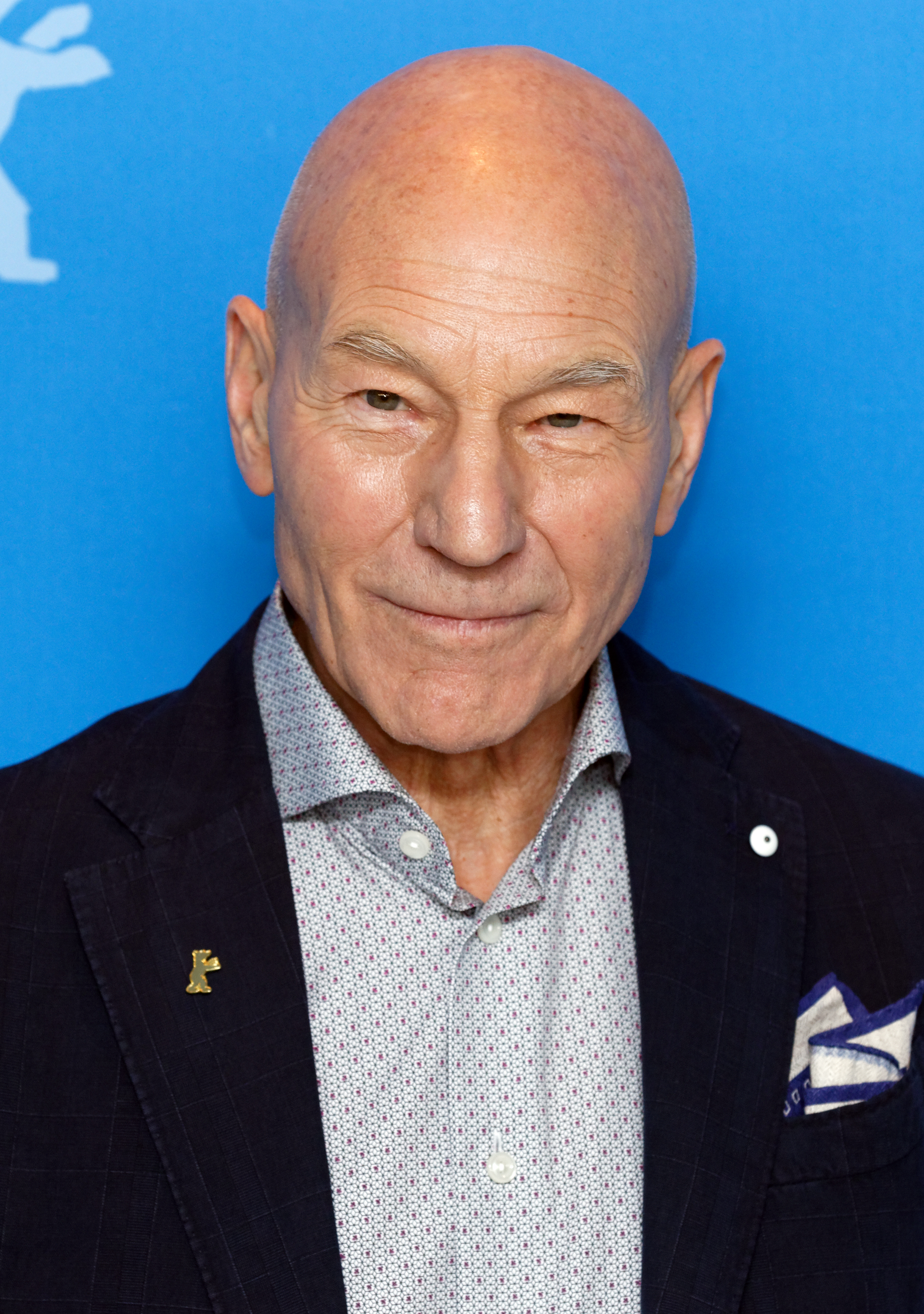
Actor Patrick Stewart guest starred in "Lois Kills Stewie".

"Stewie Kills Lois" and "Lois Kills Stewie" are the 102nd and 103rd episodes of Family Guy respectively. They are the fourth and fifth episodes of the sixth season of the show. "Stewie Kills Lois" was written by executive producer and former Futurama writer David A. Goodman. The episode was directed by John Holmquist. "Lois Kills Stewie" was written by recurring voice actor and future showrunner Steve Callaghan, and directed by Greg Colton. Colton and Callaghan previously worked on the season 5 episode "Whistle While Your Wife Works".

Before the airing of the episode, a 100th episode tribute special, hosted by MacFarlane, aired on Fox. The special showcases various clips of MacFarlane's favorite moments from the last 99 episodes of the show. It also included MacFarlane asking people questions related to Family Guy.

"Stewie Kills Lois" and "Lois Kills Stewie", along with the final five episodes of the fifth season and the first seven episodes of the sixth season, were also released on DVD under the title "Volume 6" by 20th Century Fox in the United States and Canada on October 21, 2008, five months after they had completed broadcast on television. The DVD release also features bonus material including deleted scenes, commentaries, and a 'making of' feature.

Both episodes aired before the 2007–2008 Writers Guild of America strike, and were the last episodes to air before it. In November 2007, Variety reported that MacFarlane had joined the strike and refused to complete more Family Guy episodes. A spokesperson for Fox said: "Our hope is that he returns to work and completes his non-writing obligations on those episodes". Fox aired two new episodes during November 2007. The following episode, "Padre de Familia", was the first of these two episodes to air. The strike ended on February 12, 2008 and the series resumed airing regularly.

In addition to the main cast, actors Patrick Stewart and Phil LaMarr, and American Idol judges Simon Cowell, Randy Jackson and Paula Abdul guest starred in the episode. The episode also featured the recurring voices of actress Jennifer Tilly and Patrick Warburton, and writers Danny Smith and John Viener in minor appearances. Future showrunner Mark Hentemann also made some appearances.

== Cultural references ==
When Stewie becomes disappointed that Lois did not take him on the cruise, he relates that he has not expressed it much since he saw The Lake House. Peter and Lois watch the sunset; Lois notes that she feels like Kate Winslet's character in Titanic, but Peter believes that she was portrayed by Philip Seymour Hoffman. Leonardo DiCaprio is also referenced in the scene.

The cliffhanger ending where Lois returns to reveal Stewie as her attempted killer is a tribute to part one of the Star Trek: The Next Generation two-parter "The Best of Both Worlds" with similar cliffhanger music and "To Be Continued..." title cards. Since they're both Trekkies, Seth MacFarlane and David A. Goodman had wanted to use the cliffhanger music from "The Best of Both Worlds" if they ever got up to 100 episodes of Family Guy. Paramount wouldn't give them the rights, however, so composer Ron Jones, who wrote the music for "The Best of Both Worlds" and several other episodes of Star Trek: The Next Generation, wrote and recorded the music heard in the episode.

While looking for Stewie, Joe and other police officers travel to the Fortress of Solitude, where the maid Consuela works for Superman. Stewie is seen auditioning for American Idol in a cutaway, singing "Lost in Your Eyes" before judges Simon Cowell, Randy Jackson and Paula Abdul, who all vote him out.

American Dad! characters Stan Smith and Avery Bullock make a crossover appearance in "Lois Kills Stewie" when Stewie hacks into the supercomputer. This crossover is extended on the Volume 6 DVD when, before the confrontation, Brian and Stewie first bump into Stan and Bullock in the restroom.

The episode concludes with a reference to The Sopranos as the screen blacks out on Stewie criticizing the series' finale.

The news anchor, Tom Tucker, copies Dennis Miller's signature phrase from Weekend Update on Saturday Night Live, saying, "Well, folks, that's the news, and I am outta here!" while drawing a circle on a paper.

"Stewie Kills Lois" features the recurring gag of the Kool-Aid Man bursting through the courtroom wall at an inopportune time, exclaiming "Oh yeah!" after a series of people in the courtroom say "Oh no!" in turn. The Kool-Aid Man then slowly backs out of the hole in the wall in embarrassment. This time, the judge implores the people of the court to please stop saying "Oh no!," because, as he puts it, "The damn Kool-Aid Man is gonna keep showing up!"

"Lois Kills Stewie" also mocks the varying quality of direct-to-video Disney films in general, in which a cutaway shows Jafar, the main antagonist in Aladdin, undergoing an eye exam in the film Aladdin 4: Jafar May Need Glasses. In addition, Lois is seen wearing John Rambo's combat outfit from Rambo III in her final battle against Stewie.

After switching bodies with Lois, Peter hums the theme song to Green Acres.

After Peter kills Stewie, he delivers the one-liner "It's just been revoked!" from Lethal Weapon II; Brian comments that the line doesn't fit the situation; Peter then says instead, "I'll have what she's having."

== Reception ==
" "Blue Harvest" was a missed opportunity that succeeded only because of the source material it drew from.

Thankfully, the majority of the episodes that followed managed to thoroughly entertain, including the history-making two-part Stewie and Lois murder episodes aptly titled "Stewie Kills Lois" and "Lois Kills Stewie." Stewie fulfills his series-long fantasy of killing his mother, and does so with the type of callous violence that you'd expect for this implausible scenario. Despite the cop-out ending in the second part, the journey was worthwhile and the barrage of jokes was relentless.

— Ramsey Isler, IGN

Ahsan Haque of IGN rated "Stewie Kills Lois" a 9/10, while rating "Lois Kills Stewie" a 9.4/10, saying "For the hundredth episode of Family Guy, Seth McFarlane and friends tackle the subject of one of Stewie Griffin's greatest ambitions — his not-so-secret desire to kill his mother. For the disturbed fans waiting for some form of a matricidal manifestation, you can feel comfort knowing, without spoiling too much, that the youngest Griffin absolutely means business and ensures that he doesn't fail this time around. [...] There are some tense courtroom moments, a birthday celebration with the gift of Lionel Richie, a cruise ship, machine guns, and the reappearance of the Kool Aid Man that help round out this carefully crafted and well-told cohesive storyline. With the amount of cheap manatee jokes kept to a reasonable level, this episode also manages to find an excellent balance between comedy and storytelling. It's a fantastic way to celebrate the Family Guy one-hundredth episode milestone. [...] With the writers' strike in full effect, it seems that this might be the last new episode of Family Guy we'll be seeing for a while. It's a bittersweet way to end the abruptly short season as the quality is reminiscent of the series' brilliance from the early years and it seems like the show was really starting to hit its stride for the season. Hopefully the series will be able to live up to the high bar set by this two-part classic upon its eventual return."

Richard Keller of TV Squad gave "Stewie Kills Lois" a much more negative review. He pointed out that the episode was hyped because before the episode aired a retrospective premiered featuring clips from the last 99 episodes, he stated that the episode was a huge disappointment. He stated that he did not find the episode funny, but rather disjointed, with little story and too many cutaway gags and flashbacks. In his review of "Lois Kills Stewie", Keller gave a much more positive review. He did mention that the end of the episode was somewhat predictable, as they had killed Cleveland and Stewie. He commented positively to some of the jokes of the episode, and in the overall he mentioned he liked the two episodes, but he was not so keen of the ending of the episode.

On her review of "Stewie Kills Lois", Genevieve Koski of The A.V. Club rated the episode a B+. She commented that it was "a bit weird" that the show was focusing on Stewie's desire to kill Lois, since in the last couple of seasons the Stewie and Brian dynamic had taken precedence, while Lois was being more foil to Peter than Stewie. She felt that most of the cutaway humor felt familiar and that there was no real moment that would deserve any callback status in future episodes. She did praise the cliffhanger, stating that she was intrigued about how the storyline would turn out. She also praised the storyline and liked how it was able to create drama. In her review of "Lois Kills Stewie", Koski rated the episode a B, calling the end of the story a bit predictable as she thought that the deaths of Lois, Cleveland and Stewie were a one time joke. She praised and disliked some jokes and gags in the episode, including Stewie demanding praise for his macaroni picture of an owl and Lois' salvation via merman, respectively. She commented that the fight sequence was extended and highly choreographed.

"Lois Kills Stewie" was voted #9, and "Stewie Kills Lois" was voted #8 on BBC Three's list of Top Ten Family Guy Episodes.
