= List of The Shield characters =

The following is a list of character summaries from the FX Networks television series The Shield.

== Main characters ==
- Michael Chiklis – Vic Mackey (2002–2008)
- Glenn Close – Monica Rawling (2005)
- Catherine Dent – Danielle "Danny" Sofer (2002–2008)
- Reed Diamond – Terry Crowley (2002, recurring 2003)
- Paula Garces – Tina Hanlon (2008, recurring 2006–2007)
- Walton Goggins – Shane Vendrell (2002–2008)
- Michael Jace – Julien Lowe (2002–2008)
- Kenneth Johnson – Curtis "Lem" Lemansky (2002–2006)
- Jay Karnes – Holland "Dutch" Wagenbach (2002–2008)
- David Marciano – Steve Billings (2008, recurring 2005–2007)
- Benito Martinez – David Aceveda (2002–2008)
- Cathy Cahlin Ryan – Corrine Mackey (2005–2008, recurring 2002–2004)
- David Rees Snell – Ronnie Gardocki (2006–2008, recurring 2002–2005)
- CCH Pounder – Claudette Wyms (2002–2008)

== Monica Rawling ==
Monica Rawling
- The Shield character
- First appearance: "The Cure" (2005)
- Last appearance: "Ain't That a Shame" (2005)
- Created by: Shawn Ryan
- Portrayed by: Glenn Close

In-universe information
- Gender: Female
- Title: former Captain
- Occupation: former police officer

Captain Monica Rawling is a fictional character from the FX television show The Shield, played by Glenn Close, who received an Emmy nomination as Outstanding Lead Actress in a Drama Series for her performance, and Golden Globe Award nomination as Best Actress in a Television Series - Drama.

=== Character history ===
Monica Rawling succeeded David Aceveda as Captain of the Farmington precinct. A morally strong woman, she tried to redeem Vic Mackey and Ronnie Gardocki by involving them in a controversial asset forfeiture program designed to clean up Farmington, by destroying the neighborhood drug trade. The program was extremely unpopular with the local citizens, yet she kept the seizures in place, believing they did more good than harm.

Rawling began her police career in Farmington, where she started as a patrol officer partnered with Rich Nelson. In "Back in the Hole", drug kingpin Antwon Mitchell reveals that Rawling and Nelson had an affair, but the married father Nelson eventually returned to his family. When Mitchell murdered a 14-year-old girl turned police informant, Rawling was determined to take him down. A video recording of him confessing the murder to Shane Vendrell and ordering Vic Mackey's death provided the means to send Mitchell back to jail. However, after finally proving that Mitchell was responsible for ordering the brutal stabbing deaths of two Farmington police officers, Rawling learned that David Aceveda had arranged an immunity deal for the imprisoned drug lord. Learning that the DEA was using Antwon's information to build a case against the Salvadoran drug cartel which had been supplying him with heroin, Captain Rawling ordered Vic and the Strike Team to build a case against the Salvadorans first.

The DEA was enraged and subsequently threatened to cut off all Federal funding to the LA area unless Rawling was fired. Although the Chief immediately complied, Rawling was allowed to remain at the Barn until Mitchell was delivered to the police station and formally arrested for the Farmington cop killings.

Vic informally visited Rawling one last time in her residence in Farmington. She has a small chat with him about the future and asks if he ever thinks about how things would end for him, Vic responds that he will take things as they come. Monica tells him to promise her to be mindful of his actions and to take good care of himself, a subtle warning to Vic unaware that IAD will be investigating him and the Strike Team. Mackey tells her to do the same and wished each other good luck for the future before departing. Right after closing the door, Rawling broke down in tears, visibly devastated by having been fired. She was the only member of the Farmington Police Division to not attend the celebration at the local bar of Mitchell's arrest. Her final scene shows her alone in her house, sitting on the couch drinking a beer, in contrast to the crowded, boisterous, noisy celebration at the bar.

=== Relationship with Vic Mackey ===
Before Rawling arrived at the barn, Aceveda disbanded the strike team and wrote a burn notice on Mackey. This made Mackey "untradable" because no other department would take him afterwards. As Rawlings put it, he was the "red-headed stepchild of the barn before (she) came."

Rawling gave Vic more responsibility, and took him on as a sort of right-hand man, despite Aceveda's protests. Despite a few arguments, their relationship was usually cordial. While Mackey serves as a good cop, he was also a political liability.

Early in the season, Rawling opens an investigation into Mackey to prove to Aceveda that Mackey was clean. However, IAD confirmed Monica's suspicions about the Strike Team correct when they found a brick of heroin in Lemansky's car that he confiscated from a drug dealer and never turned in as evidence. Rawling, having lost her job as Captain, said it was someone else's problem now. This eventually leads to IAD Lieutenant Jon Kavanaugh's investigation into the Strike Team.

== Danielle Sofer ==
Danielle Sofer
- The Shield character
- First appearance: "Pilot" (2002)
- Last appearance: "Family Meeting" (2008)
- Created by: Shawn Ryan
- Portrayed by: Catherine Dent

In-universe information
- Nickname: Danny
- Gender: Female
- Title: Sergeant
- Occupation: Los Angeles Police Department sergeant
- Children: Lee Sofer (son)

Sergeant Danielle "Danny" Sofer is a fictional Los Angeles Police Department sergeant in the television drama series The Shield. Sofer is played by Catherine Dent.

Danny started the series as a patrol officer who aspires to become a detective. She has an on-again, off-again sexual relationship with Vic Mackey, and a complicated history with Dutch Wagenbach. Captain David Aceveda trusts her, helping her get reinstated after she is fired and arranging for her to be reassigned to Julien Lowe. Sofer becomes a mentor for Lowe, though the two don't see eye to eye on several personal issues and aspects of police work. She is forced to kill an Arab man, and the repercussions haunt her through several episodes as she is continually harassed. In season 5, she is assigned to desk duty as a result of her pregnancy. The identity of the father is unknown and is the subject of an office pool among her co-workers. Even though she is driven to the hospital by Julien, in her hospital bed after giving birth, Vic asks if Danny will tell the baby who the father was and she tells Vic that she will let the baby know, "when he's old enough," implying that Vic is indeed Lee's father. In Season 6, Captain Claudette Wyms promotes Danny to the rank of sergeant; however, since open sergeants positions were filling rapidly, Danny was told she would have to end her maternity leave immediately in order to get a guaranteed full-time position.

Danny is partnered up with Tina Hanlon and the two clash frequently as Danny feels that Tina is too inexperienced to be relied upon while Tina feels that Danny doesn't respect her or her skills. Things escalate when both women fix their eye on Kevin Hiatt, though Danny later admits that it was only to see if she could still "get her girl on." Later on, after hearing a confession, Danny consoles Dutch in the locker room and the pair share a kiss.

== Ronnie Gardocki ==
Ronald Everett "Ronnie" Gardocki
- The Shield character
- First appearance: "Pilot" (episode 1.01)
- Last appearance: "Family Meeting" (episode 7.13)
- Created by: Shawn Ryan
- Portrayed by: David Rees Snell

In-universe information
- Nickname: Ronnie
- Title(s): Detective, Strike Team member
- Occupation: Los Angeles Police Department detective

Detective Ronald Everett "Ronnie" Gardocki, is a fictional character who appears in the FX crime drama The Shield. He is portrayed by David Rees Snell. Ronnie is known for his extremely calm demeanor, well-groomed appearance, and quiet nature.

=== Background ===
Little is known about the background of Detective Ronnie Gardocki. His surname is of Polish origin, but no other clues about his past are given. A DVD commentary by Michael Chiklis said that all the show's characters are from where the actors themselves are from, which would mean that Gardocki is from Wichita, Kansas.

Ronnie has very few lines in comparison with the rest of the Strike Team members, and consequently it is difficult for the viewer to ascertain much information about him through what he says. He is trusted implicitly by Vic Mackey, who at times often shields Ronnie from the darker schemes involving the Strike Team. Ronnie, either deliberately or unconsciously, tends to stay in the background, rarely speaking up about anything, though he radiates a manner of unshakable confidence.

Superficially, Gardocki can be described as "geeky" due to his interest in electronic equipment and computers. In episode "Blowback" he comments that he went to California State University, Northridge. Besides this aptitude with computers, he has been shown to enjoy the band Journey, beer, and is an avowed atheist (he implies to Shane that, unlike Vic, he is unafraid of divine wrath). He has severe allergies (in one episode, he comments that he's allergic to "everything but sheet metal"). He appears to favor the Beretta 8045 Cougar F as his sidearm. He had a thick mustache in the first two seasons for which he was occasionally mocked for, before growing a full beard in the Season Three, to cover up the scarring caused by Mexican drug lord Armadillo Quintero.

Gardocki's personality changes somewhat over the course of the show. Initially he is somewhat of a geek, speaking awkwardly with a woman during a prostitution sting (and being mocked for it by his teammates). After Season Three begins, he takes on more of an extroverted manner, participating in more dangerous, hands-on police work with the Strike Team. This is reflective of his experiences over his time working with Mackey. Over the course of the show he is seen flirting with several women; he is also admired by Officer Tina Hanlon, though the potential relationship never develops, and during Season Seven is shown taking an attractive Asian woman back to his apartment.

His calm and quiet personality sharply contrasts with the more aggressive members of the Strike Team. However, he has also been shown to have a violent side: when the Strike Team tried to break up a riot between a group of black and Hispanic gang members at a funeral home, a black gang member struck Gardocki in the back of the head with a crucifix hanging on a nearby wall. After finding out the identity of the culprit, the Strike Team tracked him down so that Gardocki could beat the man bloody.

Gardocki ultimately distinguishes himself from the other three members of the Strike Team as being the most careful and smart in maintaining his outward image as an upstanding, incorruptible cop. Although he committed and was involved in as many crimes as the other three members, Gardocki manages to evade his superiors and their wrath as an individual, unlike the three other team members who all get caught for individual crimes or questionable actions made separately from the overall Strike Team. This is due to Gardocki being extremely guarded and intelligent in the way he handles not only the team's illegal activities, but his own, and he never leaves evidence or proof of his involvement with the majority of his questionable actions. He was the only member of the Strike Team to escape the majority of the damage of IAD Lieutenant Kavanaugh's investigation due to there being no direct evidence on his use of the Money Train money, his involvement with Terry Crowley's death, and other crimes more visibly committed by Mackey and Vendrell.

Only in the final episodes of the series do Gardocki's crimes become known by his superiors, though his careful personality is not the cause of it. His involvement in crimes is only exposed because of his team leader and best friend Mackey, who revealed the Strike Team's criminal acts—Gardocki's included—in order to gain immunity from ICE, sending Gardocki to prison for life.

=== Character history ===
Gardocki appeared in about two-thirds of the first season's episodes, including a brief appearance in the pilot for which Snell went uncredited. To explain why a member of the Strike Team would be missing in action so often, it was established that Mackey often has Gardocki run errands.

After Mackey uses a stove to burn the face of Armadillo, a violent Mexican drug lord, Armadillo retaliates by doing the same to Gardocki (after Gardocki's paranoia, which was ignored by the Strike Team), leaving him on the brink of death. Gardocki survives, but is left permanently disfigured. It is hinted that Gardocki will not return to active duty, and detective Tavon Garris is hired to join the Strike Team. Fellow team member Shane Vendrell is initially resentful towards Garris for taking his spot on the team.

Gardocki returns and decides to take a more active role in the Strike Team, particularly in planning out a means for the Strike Team to hijack the Armenian mob's "Money Train," a convoy used in a money laundering operation. Gardocki, initially interested in the idea, became a much larger advocate for it after his disfigurement, coming up with an alternate method of stealing the money that bypassed the problems within the original plan.

Gardocki later notices that a large sum of the "Money Train" loot is missing, and openly accuses Mackey and Vendrell of stealing the money. When the real thief is revealed as Vendrell's girlfriend, Gardocki states that it is not safe for any member to use the loot, given that the police are still looking for the identity of the people behind the heist.

Lemansky ultimately burns the remaining money from the robbery, fearing that the team's actions will eventually be discovered. When Lemansky's actions cause tension between him and Vendrell, Gardocki attempts to mediate between the two. However, tensions between the team eventually lead to the team's dissolution. Lemansky and Vendrell are transferred to different divisions, but Gardocki remains as Mackey's partner. When suspicions between Mackey, Gardocki, and Lemansky arise regarding Vendrell's involvement with drug kingpin Antwon Mitchell, Gardocki plants a camera in Vendrell's car. The camera captures Mitchell ordering Vendrell to kill Mackey, an act that leads to Mitchell's eventual arrest.

After the Strike Team is re-formed following Mitchell's arrest, Gardocki and the rest of the team are investigated by Internal Affairs Lieutenant Jon Kavanaugh due to their suspected involvement in various crimes. Kavanaugh finds discrepancies in some of the team members' finances (a result of their using money from the "Money Train" heist), but Gardocki escapes suspicion due to careful management of his share of the money. Kavanaugh points out that because of the others, Gardocki may go down for "a mistake you were too smart to make", foreshadowing his ultimate fate.

Lemansky later becomes a fugitive after Kavanaugh charges him with stealing heroin from a criminal informant's house. On the way to a covert meeting with Lemansky, Gardocki and Mackey are tailed by Kavanaugh's agents. By the time they escape their pursuers and arrive at the rendezvous point, Vendrell had killed Lemansky with a grenade in order to prevent him from giving up evidence on the other members of the Strike Team.

Gardocki begins to suspect Vendrell's involvement in the murder, but is initially unable to find evidence to justify his suspicions. Eventually, Mackey discovers the truth and threatens to kill Vendrell. Vendrell responds by creating a document detailing the various crimes committed by the Strike Team, informing Mackey that the document—containing enough evidence to put Mackey and Gardocki in prison for the rest of their lives – will find its way to the police if Mackey carries out his plans for revenge.

Vendrell approaches Gardocki with an offer to form an alliance against Mackey. When Gardocki declines, Vendrell informs him of Mackey's involvement in the murder of detective Terry Crowley. Gardocki, unmoved because he had long suspected as much, confronts Mackey to demand why he had been left out of the plot. Mackey refuses to admit to the murder in front of Gardocki.

Mackey and Gardocki later discover that Vendrell has informed the Armenians of their involvement in the Money Train heist. The Armenians have vowed to get revenge by killing Mackey, his family, and Gardocki, so Mackey forges a truce with Vendrell in order to deal with the threat. When Gardocki expresses refusal to work with Vendrell, Mackey promises that they will deal with Vendrell after the threat from the Armenians is resolved. Meanwhile, Gardocki is promoted to lead the Strike Team in light of Mackey's upcoming forced retirement. This is done to marginalize Mackey during his final weeks on the job, as Gardocki would be held responsible for any wrongdoing on Mackey's part.

Mackey and Gardocki craft a plan to simultaneously eliminate both Vendrell and the leadership of the Armenian mob. Their plan succeeds in eliminating the Armenians, but Vendrell escapes and realizes he had been set up. Vendrell responds by attempting to murder both Mackey and Gardocki; this too fails, and he is exposed for conspiring to murder his two teammates.

Vendrell flees, increasing pressure on Mackey and Gardocki to eliminate him before he tells the police of their involvement in various crimes. Mackey begins working with ICE, hoping that in exchange for bringing down a Mexican drug cartel both he and Gardocki will be offered jobs and granted immunity for any crimes committed as members of the Strike Team.

ICE refuses to grant immunity to Gardocki, extending it only to Mackey. In order to secure his own immunity, Mackey is required to confess to the various crimes committed by the Strike Team. Frustrated at her inability to prosecute Mackey for the heinous actions he admits to, ICE agent Olivia Murray tells Mackey that she has enough evidence to send Gardocki to prison for life and will have him arrested after the conclusion of the cartel investigation. Unable to warn Gardocki for fear of voiding his immunity agreement, Mackey lies and tells Gardocki that he successfully secured immunity for both of them.

After the drug cartel is brought down, Gardocki is informed that Vendrell committed suicide and killed his own family in order to avoid arrest. Gardocki is distraught at the news, but relieved that Vendrell will no longer be able to threaten him. Gardocki is shocked shortly thereafter when Claudette gives the signal to Dutch to arrest Ronnie before Vic can alert him himself (the exact charges are never stated, though Detective Wagenbach references both the Armenian Money Train robbery along with his decision not to come forward with the revelation that Mackey had murdered Detective Crowley as Ronnie is being handcuffed). Incredulous that Mackey betrayed and lied to him, Gardocki explodes with anger at Mackey as he condemns his former friend's now hypocritical rhetoric about "protecting the team" as well as his preventing Ronnie from fleeing the country several days earlier. Ronnie's demeanor during this scene contrasts greatly with his overall personality throughout the course of the series. As Ronnie is dragged away, Claudette allows a distraught Vic to finally leave the precinct, having destroyed his relationship with the Barn once and for all.

=== Relationships ===
==== Vic Mackey ====
One of the few elements of Gardocki's background that has been explored is his close friendship with Mackey. The season two episodes "Partners" and "Co-Pilot" established that Gardocki and Mackey met after Mackey's original partner Joe Clark was fired due to excessive force complaints, but before Mackey met and became partners with Vendrell. It was Mackey who brought Gardocki onto the Strike Team after the anti-gang task force was formed.

Despite being out of the loop on several deeds, Ronnie's loyalty is established during season two when he is disfigured by a pedophile crime boss who Mackey had similarly disfigured earlier in the season. When the crime boss is arrested, he threatens to file a police brutality complaint against Mackey if Gardocki does not recant a statement which identifies the crime boss as his attacker. When Vendrell finds out the details of the situation, Mackey responds that he would turn himself in for his act of police brutality rather than be blackmailed into forcing Gardocki to recant his sworn statement and let the man who disfigured him go free. Mackey is never forced to carry out his vow, as Vendrell arranges for the mob boss to be killed by a disgruntled minion, sparing Vic from having to destroy his career for Ronnie's sake.

Despite his friendship with Mackey, Ronnie has often been kept in dark regarding some of Vic's darker plans. Most notably, Gardocki was not involved in the murder plot against Crowley. In the aftermath of the murder, Mackey and fellow conspirator Vendrell go out of their way to avoid discussing the crime in front of him. After Vendrell's estrangement from the team following his murder of Lemansky, Vendrell reveals the truth about Crowley in order to drive a wedge between the two remaining members of the Strike Team. Gardocki reveals to Mackey that he had long suspected the latter's involvement and that he understood why Mackey did what he did. Furthermore, Gardocki adds that he could have provided Mackey with emotional support after the murder, citing that he would have "looked out for [Mackey] better" than Vendrell did.

At the series' conclusion, Mackey accepts a deal to receive a job with ICE and immunity from any crimes he committed as a member of the Strike Team in exchange for helping to bring down a Mexican drug cartel. He attempts to get Gardocki in on the deal, but ICE refuses. Mackey initially holds out until Gardocki's deal is finalized, but later comes to believe that his ex-wife is in legal trouble for unwittingly assisting Mackey in his illegal actions. Fearful for his ex-wife's immediate future, he agrees to the immunity deal for himself and his ex-wife. As a condition of the deal, he is required to confess to the Strike Team's various illegal actions, implicating Gardocki in a number of them. He lies to Gardocki, telling him that immunity was secured for both of them. In the series finale, Mackey's treachery is revealed when Gardocki is arrested for his crimes, though he does apparently feel guilty for having sold Gardocki out. Despite Gardocki's loyalty, Vic never considered him as close as he did Shane. Ironically, many thought before Vic's betrayal, that Ronnie's low key nature and ability to cover his tracks would allow him to escape the Strike Team's crimes unscathed.

==== Shane Vendrell ====
Gardocki's relationship with Vendrell is much more antagonistic. For the first few seasons they were shown to be good friends, albeit not as close as Shane was to the other two. This is evident in a Season One episode when Lem and Shane profit $10000 each from a cockfighting ring, and Vendrell gives $5000 to Mackey, when Lem asks about Gardocki, Vendrell simply says "Screw Ronnie! He is off the clock". Later episodes would reveal that Vendrell considered Gardocki to be Mackey's "whipping boy", due to the fact that Mackey often has Gardocki run errands and leaves him out of major decisions involving the Strike Team. Despite this, Vendrell was visibly annoyed and upset when Tavon Garris momentarily replaced Gardocki after the latter's hospitalization, though in the end Gardocki returned and Garris also stayed.

During the events leading to the Strike Team's temporary dissolution, Gardocki became privy to several of Vendrell's misdeeds. When $7000 of the Money Train cash went missing, Gardocki suspected Vendrell and chastised Mackey for not suspecting Vendrell sooner. He comes to see Vendrell as a liability who must be watched in case he does anything which could implicate the team members in any wrongdoing. When gang leader Antwon Mitchell orders Vendrell to kill Mackey, Gardocki tells Lemansky that he hopes Mackey kills Vendrell during their next meeting.

Their friendship heals to an extent when the Strike Team re-forms. He is more willing to accept Vendrell back into the fold than Lemansky. However, after he discovers that Vendrell killed Lemansky and then drafted up a document detailing the team's crimes as part of his scheme to protect himself from reprisals of Mackey, their friendship ends once and for all. Vendrell tries to lure Gardocki away from Mackey's side, but Gardocki remains angry at Vendrell, refusing to betray Mackey or even engage in small talk with when the two are forced to work together on a stakeout.

Gardocki eventually pushes Mackey to deal with Vendrell "once and for all," culminating in Mackey arranging for Vendrell to be murdered along with the leaders of the Armenian Mob. However, when Vendrell informs Mackey that he would be willing to transfer to a new precinct once they cleared themselves of the problems involving the Armenians, Mackey begins having second thoughts about the murder attempt. Vendrell survives the attempt on his life and realizes that Gardocki and Mackey had tried to kill him, leading to Vendrell arranging for Gardocki to be killed, a scheme that fails as well. When he and his family goes on the run, Gardocki fears that if caught they will testify against him and Vic to receive better deals. Despite their antagonism, Gardocki shows a deal of sadness when he discovers that Vendrell killed himself and his family, but at the same time shows relief thinking he is safe from prosecution, not knowing Vic already gave up Ronnie.

==== Curtis Lemansky ====
Gardocki's friendship with Lemansky is noticeably less complicated. Due to Mackey and Vendrell often riding together, he and Lemansky are often tasked to work together in running down leads. "Co-Pilot" established they did not know each other until the formation of the Strike Team. When Lemansky burns most of the Money Train cash, Gardocki is angered, yet willing to move past it to keep Lemansky on the team so the Strike Team can remain in operation. Like the other members of the Strike Team, Gardocki is visibly touched when Lem reveals that he considers the team to be "the only family I got." When the Strike Team does dissolve, they are shown to still have a friendship. Gardocki begins to distrust Lemansky when he is under investigation by IAD, thinking he might sell out the team to save himself, but did not suggest violent retribution, unlike what Shane Vendrell eventually did. Upon Lemansky's death at the hands of Shane, Gardocki, like Mackey, wants to find the culprit and kill him. Gardocki still seeks to kill the murderer when it became clear it was Vendrell, even more so than Mackey. In the final season, Gardocki is unwilling to forgive Shane for what he did to Lem and constantly reminds Vic that Lem must be avenged.

=== Reception ===
Gardocki evolves from being a "feature player who maybe [gets] a line or two, to one of the show's aces in the hole." With both Snell and Walton Goggins praised for delivering "some of their best work" in series seven. Salon are especially complimentary of the character's role in the climax of the series, writing "In contrast to impulsive, confused Shane, Ronnie was prepared to stand by Vic to the end. What made Ronnie's downfall so heartbreaking was that it had nothing to do with his own bad decisions. He was following Vic's lead, trusting his longtime partner to protect him. He even had a very rational plan to skip town a few episodes back, but Vic talked him into sticking around, in the hopes of securing an immunity deal for both of them. That's why Ronnie's arrest and realization that Vic had betrayed him constituted the most grueling moment of the whole finale, more grueling even than seeing Shane and his family dead, since Shane's short-sightedness seemed to seal their ugly fate a long time ago. Unlike Shane, Ronnie was smart and practical, but he was done in by his trust in Vic, who finally proved that he was willing to sacrifice almost anyone for his own survival." They summarise the character as "steadfast and patient and trusting." Brandon Nowalk for The A.V. Club remarks, that "Jay Karnes and David Marciano act David Rees Snell into the background [...] Karnes is letting you know Dutch's reaction to every last thing that happens. It's a full performance." Though Grant Nebel describes this as "about as misguided a criticism as you can make." He adds "If Snell gave the kind of busy, expressive, voluble performance that Karnes does [...] his character, would fail completely. [...] Snell plays Ronnie quietly, closed off, giving away so little, because that's who Ronnie is. He's someone who could keep this knowledge secret and no one, including the audience, would suspect anything [...] the one who always counsels the most pragmatic approach, the one who, as Kavanaugh said, leaves no traces or vulnerabilities. That's what makes Ronnie a compelling character, and Snell gives exactly the right performance for that." The Guardian regret that Gardocki remained "underused" until the final two series, initially referring to him as "the other one". Series seven of The Shield has been described as "the finest season of [David Rees Snell's] Shield career as the third Strike Team member, Ronnie Gardocki, and it's a season described in the commentary as the corruption of Ronnie because in several episodes Ronnie is forced to commit acts worse than he has ever done onscreen before. He's an extremely likeable character, and it's nice to see him get more screen time than has been awarded him in the past, and while David's acting might not be as critically praised as that of Michael Chiklis or Walton Goggins, he easily matches their stellar standard and his performance far surpasses simply being believable, making it easy to feel for his character. SubtleTea describe him as "introverted, but effective." NJ.com is complimentary of Snell's performance, writing that he "turned a non-speaking extra part in the pilot into a crucial role as strike team member Ronnie Gardocki. IGN share similar sentiments, adding "For much of the series, David Rees Snell was underused as Ronnie Gardocki, but the last couple of seasons deftly made use of his portrayal as the quiet workhorse of the team, as we saw more of what made Ronnie tick."

== Shane Vendrell ==
Shane Vendrell
- The Shield character
- First appearance: "Pilot" (episode 1.01)
- Last appearance: "Family Meeting" (episode 7.13)
- Created by: Shawn Ryan
- Portrayed by: Walton Goggins

In-universe information
- Aliases: Cletus Van Damme, Trap (undercover name)
- Gender: Male
- Title: Detective
- Occupation: Los Angeles Police Department detective
- Spouses: Mara Sewell-Vendrell (wife)
- Children: Jackson Vendrell (son), Frances Abigail Vendrell (unborn daughter)

Detective Shane Vendrell is a fictional character on the FX Networks police drama television series The Shield. He is portrayed by actor Walton Goggins.

Shane is a police detective who has been heavily involved in the dealings of Vic Mackey's Strike Team since its formation. He starts out as Vic's best friend and Lem's long-time good friend, but falls out with them multiple times during the course of the series. In season 3, Shane marries Mara Sewell and has a son, Jackson. Shane reveals in season 1 that he originally comes from Atlanta, Georgia. He reveals to Lem in season 5 that Mara is pregnant with the couple's second child.

=== Terry Crowley's murder ===
When Terry Crowley—an undercover informant sent by the Justice Department to expose corruption in the Strike Team—was murdered by Vic, Shane was the only witness. The other two members of the Strike Team were unaware that it was Vic, not the drug dealer Two-Time, who had murdered Terry, until season 6, when Shane had compiled a list of all their crimes to use as blackmail against Vic. Ronnie Gardocki angrily confronted Shane about the list; it implicated him, and it was at that time that Shane told him about Vic's murdering Terry. Curtis Lemansky had suspicions about Vic's murdering Terry, which Vic denied, until his struggle with Vic in season 5 when Lem disconnected the wire Kavanaugh forced him to wear and learned the truth from Vic. Early in season 1, Shane was clearly distressed about what he and Vic had done. This was most evident at Terry's funeral, where Shane was visibly shaken by seeing Terry's mother. As time passed, he was seemingly able to move past it and accepted the murder as having been necessary. When Vic expressed regret about the murder in season 5, it was Shane who reassured him that he had done it to protect the team.

=== Racism and recklessness ===
Shane has behaved in a racist manner throughout the show as he has used derogatory comments like "nigger", "darkie", "wetback", and "beaner" multiple times. Shane also drove away a potential protégé of Vic named Tavon Garris due to their personal differences. Shane also had very friendly relationships with several minority officers, as well as a sexual relationship with a black teenage girl. Walton Goggins said in an interview that he did not agree with or enjoy saying Shane's bigoted views; coincidentally or not, Shane was less vocal in his prejudices in the latter years of the series.

In Season 4, Shane was partnered with "Army", a Mexican-American detective and veteran of the Iraq War. The two became close friends, with Army notably referring to their pairing as "the hick and the spic". Shane was also the main officer looking to seek a partnership with Antwon Mitchell, a black American heroin czar. Overall, Shane is less hostile to black women than to black men. This is revealed by his friendship with female Detective Trish George, as well as his shock and outrage over the murder of a 14-year-old black girl at the hands of Mitchell.

Shane committed numerous acts of reckless behavior while part of the Strike Team, as well almost getting their operations blown on several occasions. He once threw down a suspect and urinated on him. He also accidentally had a truck full of cocaine stolen while he visited a nearby woman for sex. He once threatened a woman by locking her in the room with him and suggesting that he would rape her unless she told him where her boyfriend was. Her boyfriend was the man who shot Vic, and if he was not found he would have been killed by Joe Clark, Vic's training officer – it was, however, an empty threat.

Shane is the main catalyst for many of the problems the Strike Team goes through during the course of the series due to his recklessness and prejudices. However although he is somewhat of a loose cannon he is savvy and streetwise and has bailed Vic out of several tough situations throughout the team's history. Shane does demonstrate a certain low cunning on multiple occasions but does not possess the level of manipulation or cunning that Vic does. Shane does however have a more loving and gentler side where children are involved. A little girl who saw her father rape and murder her mother would only talk to Shane, and years later when her father came back it was Shane whom she and her family tracked down for protection. Until it was revealed that he had murdered Lem, Shane was Vic's best friend and had proven to be willing to put himself on the line for the Strike Team.

=== Marriage ===
Prior to season 3, Shane tried to portray himself as macho and promiscuous. In one instance he shamelessly tried to have sex with a murder victim's widow, who was seeking an emotional release for her grief. In season 3, he began living with a woman named Mara Sewell, who quickly became pregnant with his child after they started seeing each other, and they were quickly married.

The couple first had a young son, Jackson, and had another child on the way (mentioned in "Post Partum"). Despite Shane's marriage and children, he found other women, including an eighteen year old prostitute who was also romantically involved with high-ranking members of the One-Niners gang.

Shane was open with Mara about the ethical conundrums he faced in his police work. Mara had also directly participated in several of these situations. For example, she discovered the storage locker location and key, which she used to take some of the Money Train money to give to her mother. Unbeknownst to her, that money included marked bills the FBI had planted to break up the Armenian Mafia. In another event, Detective Tavon Garris visited Shane's house to reduce tensions with Shane, but the men ended up getting into a fist fight. Mara hit Tavon in the head with an iron, leaving him with impaired judgment and blood loss, which caused him to crash his van and sustain serious injuries. Shane and Mara reached out to Vic, who cleaned the crime scene and worked with Lem to convince Tavon the fight was his fault and thus to remain silent about it.

=== Shane's break with Vic ===
After the Strike Team robbed millions from the Armenian mob, authorities began an investigation that continued to build up until Lemansky, unable to handle the tension, burned most of the cash in a furnace. Lem agreed to transfer off the team once the Armenian situation had been resolved. However, when Aceveda told Vic the Strike Team would be disbanded with only three members left, they asked Lem to stay. When an argument among the team breaks out, Shane tells Lem that the only reason they want him to stay is so the team isn't shut down, and Lem takes off in a huff. Ronnie goes after Lem to try to calm him down, leaving Vic and Shane, the two best friends, to air their grievances with each other; Vic's jealousy over Shane's spending so much time with Mara and Shane's issues with Vic's taking the side of other people, despite their being best friends. When Shane calls Vic a bad father, he pushes Vic past the point of no return, and Vic tells him to leave right now, while he restrains himself due to their years of friendship. Shane takes off, and the Strike Team is disbanded.

=== Antwon Mitchell ===
Following the breakup of the Strike Team, Shane was reassigned out of "The Barn" to Vice, and was assigned a new partner, Armando "Army" Renta. Shane operates in a similar manner to his role model, Vic, only with less success, and he trains Army to engage in his corrupt practices. Shane offered his services to rising drug lord Antwon Mitchell, who accepted in order to protect his shipments. The arrival of new Farmington Captain Monica Rawling and the revival of the Strike Team caused plans to go awry. Shane attempted to protect his interest in Mitchell's business and rejoined the Team to allow him to stay informed about the seizures. However, Shane's growing arrogance and his failure to report an upcoming raid led to a large loss of drugs, money, and One-Niner gang members.

An enraged Mitchell decided to scrap his deal. Shane and Army were lured to a meeting, severely beaten by Antwon's men, and then were forced to watch as an informant, a 14-year-old named Angie Stubbs, was murdered in front of them using their own weapons. With Angie's body now as a trump card, Shane and Army were released, now with their careers and their freedom at the mercy of Antwon. Shane worked out of fear for several weeks, but was given an opportunity to save himself when Antwon ordered him to murder Vic Mackey, offering him Angie's body in exchange. Fortunately, the conversation was recorded by Ronnie and Lem. Vic angrily confronted Shane in an alley, threatening to kill him. After Shane explained the situation, Vic lowered his weapon and offered his life up to Shane, who refused to take it.

Vic, Ronnie, and a reluctant Lem decided to conduct a search to retrieve Angie's body and destroy Mitchell's leverage. However, as two missing cops from the Barn were found tortured and stabbed to death, Mitchell was immediately suspected. Vic and Shane arrested Mitchell, but struck a deal to watch out for one another and Vic offered to provide Mitchell with another drug supply in a drug crew called the Splash Posse. Capt. Rawling pushed Mitchell much harder than Vic would have expected and soon Antwon leaked orders through his lawyer to let Angie's body surface. In a final effort to seal Army and the Strike Team off from scrutiny, Shane decided to murder Antwon and avenge Angie, thus proving himself to Lem once more; the two reconciled before Shane prepared to confront Antwon. Shane calmly walked into the interrogation room with Antwon, lewdly taunting the drug lord about his son, an imprisoned homosexual. Antwon, although enraged, realizes what Shane was planning and calmly refused to take the bait, leaving Shane to decide whether or not to kill him anyway, but Vic interrupts with a better plan.

Vic revealed the assassination plot to Captain Rawling, along with video footage of Antwon's offer to Shane of "a body for a body." Captain Rawling was suspicious and ordered Shane to take a polygraph. Although he managed to fake his way through, he remained under scrutiny for the duration of her time as captain, which was not helped by Army refusing to take a polygraph test and transferring out of the squad. Mitchell was immediately imprisoned for the murder of Angie and later charged with murdering the two police officers. As a result, Shane was off the hook. He would mend the bridges he burned during the Money Train affair and all seemed well once again.

Six months later, Antwon is once again incarcerated, but comes back to haunt the Strike Team when Kavanaugh makes a deal with Antwon to give him information about the Strike Team. Unbeknownst to Kavanaugh, Antwon also made a deal with Vic to protect Lem in prison if he helps the One-Niners financially. The deal goes sour, however, and Antwon vows to kill Lem no matter which prison he is sent to. Antwon ultimately fails, as Lem going to prison was a lie created by Kavanaugh, and Lem is later killed by Shane.

=== Internal affairs ===
As the department began its investigation of the Strike Team, Shane's past was investigated by Lt. Jon Kavanaugh. It was revealed that while Shane and Mara were making their payments on their home legitimately, they were essentially living off of Shane's share of the Money Train. Also Antwon Mitchell disclosed his dealings with Shane to Kavanaugh.

Kavanaugh's case against the Strike Team was almost destroyed when Lem agreed to a plea deal. However, Kavanaugh's investigation into Lompoc Prison resulted in an assurance that Lem would be killed in prison. Afraid for his life, Vic convinced Lem to go on the run.

=== Lem's murder ===
Tensions began to rise among the Strike Team the longer Lem remained on the run. As details of their past began to come to light, namely the Money Train heist, it began to seem that Lem had made a deal to give up the team in order to ensure his freedom. Nonetheless, Shane still believed Lem was loyal, even taking some money out of his house payments in order to provide him with a stipend while he was in hiding.

However, when it came time to meet with Lem, the team discovered that they were being trailed in an attempt to arrest them for harboring a fugitive. Shane, the only member of the Strike Team not being trailed, was able to meet with Lem. After some discussion, it was revealed that Lem had no intention of running to Mexico and planned to turn himself in. Fearing that Lem would testify against the team, Shane used a grenade—taken from an earlier raid on the Salvadorans—to murder his team member and friend. Despite the belief that he was acting for the good of the team, Shane was grief-stricken and apologized profusely to Lem as he died. He later met the rest of the team, using the excuse that he too had been tailed.

=== Aftermath ===
The remaining Strike Team members attend Lem's funeral where they discuss current leads about Guardo. Shane later meets Ronnie and Vic at Lem's grave site, where they give Lem an improvised "three-volley salute," though there are actually seven volleys as there are only three of them. The next day Shane discovers, along with Vic and Ronnie, that Lem had no intention of "ratting out" the Strike Team. As a result, Shane's justification for Lem's murder was suddenly stripped away.

Shane spends a moment, crying to himself over the fact that he murdered Lem with no justification and appears to be on the verge of committing suicide when he is interrupted by Danny, who has arrived at the Barn to take care of some paperwork and to show off her son. Shane briefly holds the child before reuniting with the team. Shane is completely out of it during a hostage situation and singlehandedly destroys the strategy for dealing with the situation when he abruptly offers himself as a hostage, however, thanks to this, a child is rescued. Vic later chides him after dealing with a gunshot sustained in the rescue, telling Shane to be more careful, as he does not want to lose another friend. Stressed out and racked by guilt, Shane went to have sex with the teenaged black hooker he had met earlier in the day.

When a warrant was issued for Vic's arrest, Shane and Ronnie returned to the Barn on Vic's recommendation in order to not only keep themselves clear of suspicion, but also to gather information on the investigation into the charges. Shane was interviewed by Kavanaugh and Dutch and argued that it was too convenient for Kavanaugh to have discovered the amount of evidence on Vic in a few days considering that his previous investigation of six months had failed to materialize anything. Though the argument was lost on Kavanaugh, it prompted Dutch to begin questioning the validity of Kavanaugh's investigation and corroborating evidence.

Shane briefly thought of possibly creating a story of a grenade being held by Lem accidentally exploding, but it was quickly shot down by Ronnie as being "some bullshit story." Fortunately, the charges were dropped, and Shane, wishing the affair be put behind them, pleaded for Vic to stop his pursuit of Guardo Lima, the Salvadoran drug lord believed to be responsible for Lem's murder. His pleas were ignored and Vic kidnapped, tortured, and brutally murdered Guardo.

Shane became emotionally unstable, especially when children were involved, but children seemed to be his attempt at redemption. Whether putting off his suicide when being shown Danny's baby, or allowing himself to be doused with gasoline to rescue a child in danger from a junkie, or even begging for Guardo's life based on the knowledge that Guardo and his girlfriend would be having a child soon, Shane's guilt and shame showed through most sharply in these circumstances.

=== Caught red-handed ===
After learning that Guardo could not have had any involvement in Lem's murder, and clearing Antwon of the same charge, Vic read a dossier on Lem's murder put together by Kavanaugh, revealing that, contrary to his earlier claims, Shane was not followed the night Lem died—giving Vic ample evidence, motive, and a time frame to accuse Shane of the killing. Vic called Shane out at the same location where Lem had been blown apart with the grenade. Shane confessed to his crime, attempting to rationalize it while also speaking of his shame and remorse.

Vic was outraged and screamed,

"I had the chance to pull the trigger on you once before; I didn't do it, and Lem lost his life because of it!"

He warned Shane that if he ever saw him again, he would kill him. Shane drove off, calling Vic a hypocrite.

=== In the wind ===
Believing that Vic might be out to murder him, Shane takes several measures to ensure his survival, beginning with a detailed description of the past crimes of the Strike Team, including names and photos, and threatened to make it public if Vic acted against him.

In addition, Shane also informed Ronnie Gardocki about Vic's murder of Terry Crowley, attempting to drive a wedge between the two and possibly hoping to gain an ally. The news instead has the opposite effect, as Ronnie approached Vic, reproached him for not trusting his loyalty, and even tells Vic that he would have done a better job of keeping the murder secret than Shane ever could have. He then asked Vic how they will be able to put their problems with Shane behind them forever. During their interactions together, Ronnie makes no attempt to hide his disgust and hatred of Shane for what he did to Lem. In one episode, where Shane and Ronnie are on stakeout together, when Shane attempts to make idle conversation, Ronnie bluntly cuts him off, telling Shane "You want to chat up a buddy? Go find one."

=== Armenian rhapsody ===
Attempting to find a new source of income, Shane quickly took to moonlighting as an enforcer for Diro Kesakhian (Franka Potente), the young acting-boss for the Armenian mob. After he revealed the names of a three black Americans who had been robbing her stable of Russian hookers, Diro arranged for the trio to be castrated.

Vic tried to sabotage Shane and Diro's partnership by informing her about Shane's history with Mitchell. When Diro attempted to end their arrangement, Shane disclosed Vic's role in the Money Train heist—conveniently concealing his own involvement. Diro took Shane back into the fold, but put out contracts on Vic, Ronnie, and their families. Shane had neither wanted nor expected this outcome.

Shane switched his loyalty to Diro's rival, Ellis Rezian, but not before Diro's hitman threatened Corrine Mackey and her children. Shane kidnapped Vic's family and locked them in a cargo container in East Los Angeles, California, then ambushed and shot the hitman during a struggle at Corrine's house.

Rezian vowed to hold the Money Train heist over Shane's head, threatening to reinstate Diro's contracts on Vic and Ronnie—as well as Shane's own family—if his orders were disobeyed. Meanwhile, Shane convinced Diro to flee to Germany, but not before euthanizing her dying father. As she left her father's bedside, Diro told Shane,

"Your sentiment will destroy you."

=== Downfall ===
Upon learning of Rezian's threats, Vic grudgingly allied himself with Shane in order to protect his family from both the Armenians and a Mexican drug cartel. As time passed, Vic and Ronnie decided to kill Shane, and arranged for him to be assassinated by the cartel's enforcers. Vic had a change of heart at the last minute, but was unable to warn Shane of the plot. The assassination attempt ended in the deaths of Rezian's crew, but Shane escaped.

Upon realizing the Strike Team's betrayal, Shane blackmailed a pimp into murdering Ronnie while he intended to kill Vic personally. The plan went awry and the pimp was soon identified as the prime suspect in the attempted shooting of Ronnie. When Shane realized the pimp was about to reveal his involvement to Dutch, he fled the Barn and went on the run with Mara and Jackson. He blackmailed Vic into helping them by threatening to testify against him. Vic resigned from the police force and set out to insulate himself from prosecution by killing Shane and Mara.

=== The end ===
Shane and Mara's attempted flight soon fell apart. Vic discovered their new names and also noticed that they forgot Jackson's whooping cough medicine, meaning they had to risk taking their son to a hospital. Vic cornered them, but a police car drove past at the crucial moment, allowing Shane and his family to escape. Two gang members robbed them of the $100,000 Shane had stolen from Rezian. Then, while Shane was fighting with a couple of drug dealers he was trying to rob, Mara accidentally shot and killed a woman. Mara was also injured in the process.

Shane was crushed to learn of Vic's immunity deal with ICE (U.S. Immigration and Customs Enforcement) during a cell phone conversation, realizing that his last hope of saving himself and his family had disappeared with it. Holding the upper hand at last, Vic sadistically taunted Shane, saying,

"The trouble with you, you're always trying to be as smart as me, but now I'm walking away clean and you're the pathetic asshole headed for Antwon Mitchell-ville."

Shane then told Vic that the trouble with him is that he always claimed to be a family man, then reveals to Vic that Corrine has been working with the police to send Vic to prison rather than see him be around their own kids again. Shane says that no matter what happens, he and Jackson and Mara would still be a family, while Vic has nothing. Vic further threatens that after Shane and Mara were sent to prison, he would visit their children in foster care and fill their heads with stories about what their parents were really like. In their final words to each other, a devastated Shane screamed, "You don't even get to look at my kids, EVER!" to which Vic retorted, "I'll send you a postcard from Space Mountain."

To spare his family's fate and because of Vic's threats over the phone, Shane tricked his wife and son into drinking a liquid laced with an overdose of painkiller (likely secobarbital). He sat in the bathroom writing out a suicide confession note. As his former colleagues from the Barn kicked down the doors, Shane shot himself.

The confession is unfinished, due to Shane being interrupted by the police raid. The police found Shane dead with a self-inflicted gunshot wound to his head. They also found Mara and Jackson lifeless on the bed. Although no one in The Barn was fond of Shane anymore, this incident still devastated the whole Barn.

Claudette read this letter out to Vic, who was silent but clearly distraught at the way things turned out between him and his one-time best friend. She then went to watch Vic's breakdown over the cameras but, realizing what she was up to, Vic calmed himself and ripped the camera out of the wall.

In the final moments of the series, Vic is seen placing a photo of the Strike Team on his desk at ICE. However, Shane and Ronnie have been cut from the picture due to the fact that Shane killed Lem and Vic feeling guilty for selling out Ronnie. Leaving only him and Lem in the picture.

== Julien Lowe ==
Detective Julien Lowe
- The Shield character
- First appearance: "Pilot" (2002)
- Last appearance: "Family Meeting" (2008)
- Created by: Shawn Ryan
- Portrayed by: Michael Jace

In-universe information
- Gender: Male
- Title(s): Detective, Strike Team member
- Occupation: Police officer
- Spouse: Vanessa Lowe (wife)
- Children: Randall Lowe (step-son)

Detective Julien Lowe is a fictional character in the television drama series The Shield, played by Michael Jace. He is portrayed as a Los Angeles Police Department officer and a new member of the Strike Team, a four-man anti-gang unit.

=== Rookie ===
Julien is introduced as a rookie in the series pilot, paired with training officer Danielle "Danny" Sofer. Due to his Pentecostal beliefs and moralistic view of police work, Julien often clashed with his fellow officers.

Early in his career, he observed the Strike Team stealing two bricks of cocaine during a bust and reported this to Captain Aceveda. Danny was enraged that Julien would become a "rat" and told him, "This is a brotherhood." Aceveda warned Julien that the charges were serious and not to pursue them, but Julien went over his head and informed Internal Affairs. Little is known about Julien's life before the series. In the co-Pilot episode, it is shown that Julien's first day as a police officer was working in The Barn before it opened.

=== Professional life ===
Julien was partnered with a new officer after Danny was fired from the Barn, and upon her return, he preferred to work with his new partner, enjoying the comradeship. However, his new partner was involved in a tragedy and fired from the force, so Aceveda again paired Julien with Danny.

During Monica Rawling's tenure as captain, Julien became more outspoken and disapproved of her seizure policy to the point that he was going to transfer out of the department, but when the policy was shut down and Rawling was dismissed, Julien decided to remain. He soon became a training officer himself and was very tough on trainee Tina Hanlon. Due to many mistakes and Julien and Danny's recommendations, Tina was about to be dismissed until a possible scandal kept her in the Barn under the mentoring of Holland "Dutch" Wagenbach.

During the formation of a new Strike Team, Captain Claudette Wyms offered Julien to Kevin Hiatt as a possible addition to the team. Claudette made the offer to Julien, who was hesitant, mainly because of the thought of being partnered with Vic on a daily basis. After being assured that Mackey was going to be moved out of the team, Julien accepted the promotion, becoming official member of the Strike Team.

During his tenure on the Strike Team, Julien performed admirably. Due to his reputation for moral integrity, Julien was completely shut out of Vic, Shane, and Ronnie's criminal activities.

After Shane was caught in a botched attempt to murder Vic and Ronnie, a horrified Captain Wyms disbanded the Strike Team permanently. Julien was returned to uniformed patrol but was promised a swift promotion to Detective. He later participated in Captain Wyms's attempt to criminally investigate Vic and Ronnie. At the series' close, he threw Tina a party to celebrate her first year on the job.

=== Homosexuality ===
After his contact with IA over the strike team's theft of cocaine, Vic Mackey caught Julien in a homosexual encounter with a small-time hustler named Tomas Motyashik. When Julien said that he would deny the incident, Vic smiled sadistically and said,

"I don't have to prove you're gay. In this house, all I have to do is say it with all the gory details!"

A terrified Julien reluctantly agreed to recant his story. Mackey afterwards exhibited friendlier behavior towards him, but Lowe never entirely trusted him.

Later, Julien asked his pastor, "What do you do if the man you are isn't the man you want to be?" The pastor retorted, "That's easy. Just give the man you are a good kick in the ass."

Julien's homosexuality placed him at great odds with his devout Christian beliefs, even to the point that he chose not to wear his vest to a bust, hoping the perp would kill him. Through his pastor, he eventually went through conversion therapy at his church and married the mother of a young boy caught spraying gang graffiti. Tomas was eventually arrested and when Julien refused to continue their relationship, he tried to out him to the entire precinct, with some success. Two officers tormented him over his sexuality and when they were later fired, they gave Julien a "blanket party", seriously injuring him. He later confronted one of the officers and broke his arm in retaliation.

Danny was once called to Julien's house after his stepson called the police during a domestic between Julien and his mother, which turned out to be a verbal argument. The argument stemmed from their frustration over their inability to have a child together. Julien went to get his sperm checked, but the results were never shown.

When Julien goes to a sperm bank to deposit his sperm as part of a medical procedure to get his wife pregnant, he uses a gay porn magazine as masturbation material.

At the end of the series, Julien looks longingly at a gay couple, indicating stirring desires that haven't gone away.

== David Aceveda ==
David Aceveda
- The Shield character
- First appearance: "Pilot" (episode 1.01)
- Last appearance: "Family Meeting" (episode 7.13)
- Created by: Shawn Ryan
- Portrayed by: Benito Martinez

In-universe information
- Title: Police Committee Chairman
- Occupation: Mayor of Los Angeles; reserve LAPD police officer
- Spouses: Aurora Aceveda (wife)
- Children: Sofia Aceveda (daughter)

David Segovia Aceveda, played by Benito Martinez, is a character on FX's television crime drama The Shield.

He is the captain of "the Barn", a fictional LAPD precinct in the also-fictional Farmington district of Los Angeles, California and has political ambitions. In Season Three, he is elected to the Los Angeles City Council and finally relinquishes command in the first episode of Season 4. Though he is no longer captain, his responsibilities as the city council representative of the Farmington District often keep him in involved. According to show creator Shawn Ryan's commentary on the Season 1 DVD, the Aceveda character is heavily influenced by former Los Angeles mayor Antonio Villaraigosa.

=== Personality ===
Aceveda is a born politician, extremely intelligent, and ambitious. His main reason for taking the captaincy in Farmington is to raise his profile in the community to enable him to run for a seat on city council and eventually, mayor. He is thus a prisoner to his ambition and often places his morals aside to protect it. During his tenure at The Barn, he often turned a blind eye to corruption that occurred, as long as it brought results that would elevate his stature.

=== Early career ===
Aceveda grew up in Los Angeles and graduated from University of Southern California with a degree in law. Little about his early police career is known, except that he began as a uniformed officer and quickly made his way up the ranks, aided by both affirmative action and his own talent. Aceveda was appointed Captain of the Farmington District upon its inception.

=== Farmington ===
Aceveda arrived in Farmington with high aspirations and was already aware of Vic Mackey's heavy-handed tactics. He initially didn't want Mackey on the Strike Team, but Assistant Chief Ben Gilroy pushed Mackey's position through. Aceveda began efforts to take down Mackey and his often corrupt Strike Team in season 1, but his first attempt resulted in the murder of Detective Terry Crowley. As the cause became increasingly difficult, Aceveda attempted to focus more on controlling the problems within the district.

While captain, Aceveda showed signs of racial prioritizing, getting more involved in cases that involved Latino victims than cases whose victims were of a different race. Farmington's crime rate began to fall as the Strike Team and other detectives from The Barn made progress. As a result, Aceveda began to gain more accolades and praise from the city and community leaders alike. As Aceveda's status became more prominent, he announced that he would be running for Farmington's city council seat. Aceveda's campaign struggled early on, but he ultimately won the primary, and eventually, the election.

=== City council ===
Upon his election to city council, Aceveda resigned from the police department, but remained a reserve officer. He volunteered for service, assisting on the search for missing officers Carl Miller and Scooby Haimes. Aceveda still desired to control events at the Barn, as seen by his clashes with his replacement, Captain Monica Rawling.

Aceveda was briefly under investigation for bribery and corruption charges headed by IAD, but the investigation was shelved by Jon Kavanaugh in exchange for his cooperation into the activities of Vic Mackey. Aceveda supplied Vic with false information leaks in order to assist Kavanaugh with his organization. One of these leaks, the false information that Lem had worked out a deal with IAD in exchange for testimony against the Strike Team, inadvertently lead to Lem's death at the hands of Shane Vendrell. As a result, Aceveda is indirectly responsible for his death.

In the aftermath of Lemansky's death, Aceveda made a statement to the media about Lem's heroin theft. Upon learning that Lem had not worked out a deal with the IAD, Vic angrily confronted Aceveda before a press conference, blaming Aceveda for causing Lem to run. Aceveda countered by accusing Vic of not taking responsibility for his actions, but when he saw Vic was angering to the point of physical violence against him, he wisely decided to back off. Later on that evening, Aceveda announced, in a citywide press conference, that the city will be conducting an investigation into the police department in an attempt to rid itself of corrupt officers. He also stated that Lem's death, while regrettable, was a result of his corrupt actions, renewing Vic's anger.

As the events of the charges against Vic progressed, Aceveda stayed in contact with new Captain Claudette Wyms, offering support, in the form of funding for more officers and his influence on other captains to help ease the crime statistics being reported at the Barn, in exchange for information as to how the case was progressing. After the charges against Vic were dropped, Aceveda also arrived with a photographer as part of a campaign to improve the image of the Farmington police department. All of these actions may be viewed in a larger scope of Aceveda attempting to increase his standing within the community.

As time passed, Aceveda continued to push for progress on the San Marcos killings, a massacre of several Mexican immigrants by unknown assailants, mostly at the behest of Mexican real estate developer Cruz Pezuela, who was also financing his investigation committee into a possible run for mayor. Aceveda used his clout behind the scenes to ensure that Mackey was voted out of the force at his hearing. However, events took a wild turn as the image Juan Lozano took of Aceveda performing oral sex on him suddenly reappeared in the hands of Pezuela, who gave the photo to Mackey as a way to save his job.

Vic attempted to use the photo against Aceveda, only to have it denounced as a fake and to have Aceveda's lawyer threaten him with a lawsuit for slander and blackmail. Mackey later returned with the memory card, the background story of the photo, and all the existing copies. Aceveda was stunned to hear about Cruz Pezuela's involvement in the photo and after listening to Mackey's theory, agreed to help him in his investigation into Pezuela's holdings. The scope of the operation stunned the both of them, as the Mexican drug cartels were buying into Farmington and planned on using various businesses as fronts for illegal activities, including laundering money. Aceveda received the memory card as a symbol of trust between him and Mackey and the two decided to investigate Pezuela, in hopes of shutting his operation down. Later that evening, Aceveda met with Vic, who discovered a large box of sensitive material involving several important people in Los Angeles. Vic left with the material, which, when returned to the right people, would be enough to save his job.

=== Relationship with Vic Mackey ===
Aceveda has had a tempestuous relationship with Vic Mackey. During the beginning of his captaincy, he sought to take down the Strike Team for corruption in the district and assigned Detective Terry Crowley to the team. When Crowley was killed while in the company of Mackey, Aceveda dedicated himself to bringing him down. However, in a bizarre twist of fate, when Assistant Chief Ben Gilroy attempted to sacrifice both Aceveda and Mackey to save his own career, Mackey and Aceveda realized it was in their best interests to work through the problem together. From that point to the end of Aceveda's captaincy, the two maintained an uneasy alliance.

The alliance was broken when it was revealed that before Aceveda left his post, he submitted a scathing letter about Mackey to administration, notably accusing him of Terry Crowley's murder; effectively killing any possibility of promotion for Vic. Mackey was livid and the two nearly came to blows. Aceveda has since attempted to remain somewhat civil to Vic since his arrival at a scene possibly saved his life. However, it remains no secret that Aceveda wants Mackey imprisoned.

=== The rape incident, alliance with Vic, and mayoral status ===
During a gang bust of a home, Aceveda remained behind after uniformed officers left. However, two gang members, Juan Lozano and Ricky, returned to the home and overpowered Aceveda. Restraining him and taking his weapon, Juan threatened to force Aceveda to perform oral sex on him at gunpoint. However, two officers returned and knocked on the door. Juan quickly held his hand over Aceveda's mouth and the gun to his head while Ricky checked to see if the cops would leave. Unable to hear Aceveda's muffled screams for help, they left. Juan then orally raped Aceveda and took a photo using a camera phone for posterity. It appeared that Aceveda was going to be killed, but the arrival of Mackey and the Strike Team scared the two off.

Aceveda followed Ricky over a period of several months, killing him when he robbed a Korean grocery store. He recovered the cell phone with the picture in the process, and eventually caught Juan. Though Juan threatened to go public with the picture if he was not released Aceveda called his bluff, suggesting that Juan was not tech-savvy enough to have copied the picture to a computer before Aceveda deleted it from the phone. Juan's reaction to this suggestion put Aceveda's mind to rest regarding the picture, thinking that all copies had been destroyed. To further put his mind at ease Aceveda threatened Juan's family to dissuade him from even talking about the incident, before putting him in prison. However, the incident scarred Aceveda mentally for months afterward. He became estranged from his family and eventually began having a violent affair with a prostitute, re-enacting rape fantasies with intensifying brutality until he eventually pulled a gun, essentially attempting to re-enact his own rape. Horrified, Aceveda cut off relations with the hooker and seemed to make peace with himself.

Juan, wanting revenge, contacted Aceveda through his girlfriend, who attempted to get Aceveda to acknowledge the rape by taping a conversation of her threatening to go public about the incident. Aceveda predicted this move and claimed ignorance about the event before taking the tape recorder from her. The fact that Juan's girlfriend had tried to gain proof of the event by taping Aceveda's acknowledgement of it emboldened Aceveda in his belief that the photo no longer existed, despite Juan's claims. Despite this setback Juan continued in his threats to go public, claiming that the councilman no longer had any leverage over him as his grandmother had died and his cousin had been deported, both now being outside the realm of Aceveda's influence. Fearing the damage it would do to his image, Aceveda made a deal with imprisoned drug lord Antwon Mitchell to have Juan "intimated"; falsely telling him that Juan opposed the deal with the DEA; in exchange for his freedom (although Antwon's freedom was officially part of a deal with the DEA to inform against Salvadoran drug lord Bonilla). The two did fulfill their own parts of the bargain (and Juan is killed), though Mitchell was imprisoned again after Captain Monica Rawling sacrificed her career to keep Mitchell behind bars. It seems Aceveda has put the incident behind him.

In Season 5, Aceveda worked with IAD Lt. Jon Kavanaugh to put away the Strike Team once and for all. However, after Kavanaugh witnessed several suspicious meetings between Vic and Aceveda, IAD's investigation into the Strike Team spread to the councilman as well. Kavanaugh began to dig into the highly coincidental meetings Aceveda had with Juan and Antwon just before Juan was killed. Kavanaugh's incarceration in Season 6 gave the impression that Aceveda's secret was safe, however, this was not to be. A Mexican real estate developer named Cruz Pezuela provided the camera phone picture to Vic so that he could blackmail Aceveda into keeping his job. Calling Vic's bluff, Aceveda released his lawyer on Vic threatening the loss of his pension and a long legal struggle ahead. Hearing of this, Vic returns to Cruz and gets the memory card and all of the photos for favors down the line once gets his job back. Vic again approaches Aceveda with the new information and Aceveda agrees to try to help Vic keep his job and in turn Vic later gives Aceveda the memory card and all of the original pictures. Vic and Aceveda form an alliance to find out what the corrupt developer was brewing.

The scope of the operation stunned both of them; Pezuela was helping the Mexican drug cartels buy into Farmington, and planned on using various businesses as fronts for money laundering, drug trafficking, and prostitution. Aceveda received the memory card as a symbol of trust between him and Mackey, and the two decided to investigate Pezuela, in hopes of shutting his operation down.

Later, Aceveda met with Vic, who had walked out on a Department Review Board hearing and stolen a car full of blackmail material from one of Pezuela's couriers. Aceveda was shocked to learn the dirty secrets of many of the most influential people in Southern California, including public officials, mayoral aides, and the heads of special interest groups. Vic then asked him, "Is this enough to save my job?" Aceveda responded with a look of assent. Letting David take his own vehicle, Vic taunted Pezuela's courier and drove away.

As the series would come to a close, Aceveda seemed poised to win the Los Angeles mayoral election. In addition, he and Vic continued to collaborate in order to destroy both Pezuela and the drug cartel ruled by his psychopathic boss, Guillermo Beltran. Their friendship ended, when Vic destroyed Aceveda's attempts to blackmail ICE Agent Olivia Murray with information from Pezuela's box.

After Vic arranged an immunity deal with ICE, Aceveda was enraged that Vic could never be prosecuted for any of his crimes. The two collaborated one last time to arrange the arrest of Beltran. While speaking over the phone, Aceveda expressed satisfaction that ICE had realized that, "they have a reptile working for them." Mackey reminded Aceveda about his prior statement about "respecting each other's endgames."

In his final scene, he is back at The Barn in the captain's office with Claudette, explaining to her that the rumors of him setting up the assassination of one of his opponents, who was running for mayor and seemed to be gaining more voters than Aceveda, were completely false. Claudette did not believe them either, but could not turn down the rumors spreading about an attempt on David's life even if it is false. He expressed his disappointment that both of them could not nail Vic, despite how much time and effort spent in The Barn trying to. Claudette congratulates Aceveda about him going to be the Mayor of Los Angeles.

== Claudette Wyms ==
Claudette Wyms
- The Shield character
- First appearance: "Pilot" (episode 1.01)
- Last appearance: "Family Meeting" (episode 7.13)
- Created by: Shawn Ryan
- Portrayed by: CCH Pounder

In-universe information
- Nickname: Peaches
- Gender: Female
- Title: Captain
- Occupation: Los Angeles Police Department captain
- Spouses: 2 ex-husbands (Jeff Franklin )
- Children: Bonnie Wyms (daughter); Rebecca Wyms (daughter)
- Relatives: Bryce Wyms (father)

Captain Claudette Wyms is a fictional Los Angeles Police Department captain in the television drama series The Shield. Claudette is played by CCH Pounder.

=== Personal ===
Claudette has been divorced twice and raised two daughters, Bonnie (portrayed by Tracie Thoms) and Rebecca (portrayed by Tangi Miller). Claudette's father, Bryce, sometimes refers to her as "Peaches," much to her partner's amusement. Bryce also revealed to Dutch that Claudette had studied ballet, in Paris. Her ex-husband Jeff Franklin was shot and killed by an "E-Park Johnnie" gang member while buying flowers for his fiancée; Bonnie was in the car with him at the time.

Like Ronnie Gardocki, Claudette appears to be an atheist, and challenges Dutch Wagenbach when he suggests that a higher power saved a life in peril, asking why that "higher power" failed to save the other victims or prevented the peril from taking place altogether.

=== Career ===
Claudette is a veteran detective who has been on the police force for more than 25 years. She is one of the department's first female black officers.

During her early days at The Barn, she went against the lead detective on a case and ended up solving the crime. This earned the respect of Detective Holland "Dutch" Wagenbach, who requested to be partnered with Claudette. She and Dutch are among the few regular detectives throughout the series who do not fire their sidearms on screen.

Claudette is the self-appointed voice of morality at The Barn and often butts heads with Vic Mackey over his tactics. At the start of season 3, Claudette is supposed to take over as captain of The Barn, but David Aceveda stays throughout the rest of the season and even steals some of Claudette's new ideas. At the end of that season, Claudette is being groomed to take over running The Barn as the new captain but loses the promotion when she charges a public defender with negligence, resulting in countless convictions' being overturned.

In season 5, Claudette admits to Dutch that she has had lupus for 15 years and that it has been flaring up recently. She collapses at the end of season 5 episode 7, following a particularly harrowing interrogation. She returns to The Barn shortly thereafter and is soon promoted to captain after bringing Steve Billings' shortcomings to the attention of the Assistant Chief.

Throughout the final season, Dutch discovers Claudette's lupus has grown progressively worse. He attempts to ease some of her burdens, such as hiring a maid to help her maintain a decent household. In the series finale, Claudette reveals that she is in the terminal stage and "sooner rather than later" will be dead, but she will spend all of her remaining time working in her position.

In the same episode, she leads the team that discovers Shane Vendrell has committed suicide and murdered his family, and she views the scene with a distraught look on her face. Later that night, she calls for Vic and Ronnie Gardocki to return to The Barn. She makes Vic sit on the "perps' side" in the interrogation room and reads him Shane's unfinished suicide note. "You must be pretty proud of yourself with all those arrests and drug busts," she says, adding sarcastically, "This is what the hero left on his way out the door." She leaves pictures of Shane and his family's dead bodies as she gets up and leaves, waiting to see if Vic will crack after seeing the damage he did.

Vic tears the room's surveillance camera off its mooring and tells Claudette to bill him for it; she replies, "First payment is due now." She makes sure Vic watches in horror as Dutch arrests Ronnie for all the crimes Vic sold him out on for the ICE immunity deal, before Vic can alert Ronnie, and Vic stands in shock as Ronnie is taken away in handcuffs screaming about his betrayal while everyone in The Barn looks at Vic with contempt and disgust. Claudette then pointedly tells the ruined Vic, "You can go now."

== Dutch Wagenbach ==
Holland Wagenbach
- The Shield character
- First appearance: "Pilot" (episode 1.01)
- Last appearance: "Family Meeting" (episode 7.13)
- Created by: Shawn Ryan
- Portrayed by: Jay Karnes

In-universe information
- Nicknames: Dutch, Dutchman, Dutchboy
- Gender: Male
- Title: Detective
- Occupation: Police officer
- Spouse: Ex-wife

Detective Holland "Dutch" Wagenbach is a fictional character on FX's hit drama The Shield. He is played by actor Jay Karnes. Dutch is the only character besides Vic Mackey who appears in all 89 episodes of the series.

=== Character overview ===
Dutch Wagenbach is characterized by many as a socially inept nerd of German descent, even though he is a successful police detective. Assigned to the Farmington district of Los Angeles, Dutch is often the first called to investigate violent crimes due to his specialization in offender profiling and serial killers. Along with his partner, Detective Claudette Wyms, Dutch is widely considered to be the moral center of the show due to his willingness to do the right thing, despite the temptation to engage in illegal police activities.

Dutch is one of the few characters on The Shield who has had details revealed about his personal life. A divorced, middle-aged police detective who was born in the Midwest, Dutch became a police officer mainly as a means to gain the love and approval of his emotionally distant father. The impetus for his divorce was revealed in Season 2: his wife, an alcoholic, cheated on him and became pregnant by her Alcoholics Anonymous sponsor. Dutch is sexually frustrated, despite his claim that he has been laid "more than a few times" and in season 1 acquires a girlfriend. He is one of two regular detectives throughout the whole series who never fired his weapon; the other is his partner Claudette.

=== Relationships with his fellow officers ===
Dutch is not especially popular around his precinct. Many of his fellow officers consider Dutch to be over-educated and egotistical, at best, and a "rube", at worst, because his ex-wife carried on an adulterous affair behind Dutch's back with her Alcoholics Anonymous sponsor that resulted in her becoming pregnant with his child. Despite this, Dutch's detective skills give him a good amount of respect at the Barn, such as in the Season 1 episode "Dragonchasers" in which his questioning of a serial killer is universally lauded by his colleagues.

=== Vic Mackey ===
Dutch has a heated rivalry with Detective Vic Mackey. Dutch considers Vic to be nothing more than a brutish thug. This, in turn has led to Vic's taking the rather public stance that he considers Dutch to be an over-educated elitist and calling him "Dutch Boy".

The two engaged in several back-and-forth verbal fights over the course of the show, with Vic mocking Dutch's failure with women and Dutch briefly dating Vic's ex-wife Corrine. They very nearly came to blows in season 4 when Dutch, who had just physically confronted another detective, accidentally hit Vic with a wild punch and was more than willing to throw hands with Vic before Claudette neutralized the entire incident.

However, there are moments of mutual admiration between the two. Towards the end of season 1, Dutch was able to successfully get a serial killer who was targeting local prostitutes to confess after a lengthy interrogation. This resulted in Vic's conceding that Dutch was as smart as he claimed and resulted in a truce between the two that lasted until the end of season 3. Even once their truce was over and their relationship ran cold again, Vic respected Dutch's skills enough to continue consulting with him during emergencies; in a key instance, Dutch's profile of a spree serial rapist enabled Vic to catch up with him before his third victim in a single day, and the final season, Vic helped Dutch on a case involving a shady former cop Vic had previously met.

Dutch may be the only cop in the Barn who truly scares Vic, in terms of his potential to bring the Strike Team down if he ever put his mind towards the goal. This fear of Dutch's going after the Strike Team was most notable during the money train heist arc, when Dutch began to close in on the Strike Team for their part in the heist. Vic openly showed fear that Dutch would not stop until he caught the Strike Team and tried to intimidate Dutch into dropping his investigation by threatening to resume his bullying of him, a move that effectively signaled the end to their truce. Mackey claimed that Dutch would be back to being "a joke" in the Barn. During season 4, the Strike Team secretly bugged Dutch's car and mocked his lack of success on a date with a friend of Claudette's, as well as his singing of Duran Duran's "Hungry Like the Wolf".

Dutch's investigation of the money train ultimately triggered the tragic series of events that led to the death of Vic's close friend, Detective Curtis "Lem" Lemansky. Dutch informed IAD Lt. Jon Kavanaugh about his suspicions, and Kavanaugh later used the information to trick the Strike Team into thinking Lem had turned traitor against them, causing Shane Vendrell to murder his friend using a grenade stolen from a Salvadoran gang.

During Kavanaugh's investigation into the team, Dutch learned from Kavanaugh about his suspicion of Vic's involvement into Lemansky's death. Despite his dislike of Vic, Dutch confided to Claudette that he doubted Vic would ever murder a close friend, no matter the circumstances.

In the seventh and final season, Dutch, as Claudette's trusted man on the case, was instrumental in bringing the members of the Strike Team down and personally arrested Ronnie Gardocki. As a horrified Vic watched the arrest of his last remaining friend, Dutch eyed his former nemesis with unveiled contempt.

=== Steve Billings ===
Dutch intensely dislikes his fellow Detective Steve Billings, and the two come to blows at least once. Billings often humiliates Dutch but also turns to him to cover up a mistake or illegal activities (such as purchasing vending machines for the Barn to use inside the precinct for profit, which is against department rules). In season 6, the two were partnered by the new Captain, Claudette Wyms, because neither of them had a partner, much to Dutch's displeasure. Further complicating things was Claudette openly siding with Billings when Dutch objected to the pairing. The partnership worked well, as Billings' weary pragmatism counterbalanced Dutch's sense of abstraction.

Billings was sick of Dutch's needling about his various illegal actions. He reacted by pulling a prank on Dutch, playing Cupid between Officer Tina Hanlon, Dutch's secret crush, and the new Strike Team leader Kevin Hiatt, and making Dutch an unwilling witness while they were having sex. Before Dutch could confront him, Billings took a short leave from the Barn to pursue a personal injury lawsuit against the department. Dutch was instrumental in proving the biggest charges were bogus, but had to be partnered again with Billings when he was reinstated, and who still decided to put as little effort as possible in his job. After the suicide of a man he had wrongfully suspected, a humbled Dutch turned to Billings and asked him to be more involved, realizing that he was only good at his job when he had somebody to challenge his views.

In the final episodes, Billings had false evidence planted in a former sexual delinquent's house, as his former wife and his daughters were frightened by his living in the vicinity. When Dutch realized that, he confronted Billings. Billings agreed to make the charges against the delinquent drop and in exchange, Dutch half-heartedly wrote a report backing Billings in his lawsuit. Dutch finally rewrote the report as requested by Steve's attorney (who was played by Jay Karnes' real life wife) who convinced Dutch that her client should not be humiliated and should get a fair settlement. She also gave Dutch her card, hinting that she had more than just a professional interest in him. Billings made a cameo appearance on the television series S.W.A.T., during the events of "Day of Dread".

=== Claudette Wyms ===
For a long time, Dutch's only true friend was his former partner, Claudette Wyms. The two have a rather complex and symbiotic relationship: Claudette uses her empathic touch to counterbalance Dutch's psychological means of solving violent crimes while Dutch is able to keep Claudette grounded emotionally, so as to prevent her from allowing her personal grudges and vendettas keep her from seeing the big picture towards their jobs as detectives.

Though friends, Claudette did share in the criticism of Dutch's ego. Her reaction to this egomania has been a systematic campaign of mean-spirited practical jokes waged against Dutch, including leaving dog manure inside his desk drawer. Dutch has taken upon himself to blame Vic Mackey for the pranks.

Because of Claudette's unwavering determination to do the right thing, no matter the cost, Dutch has at times paid the price for his loyalty. When Claudette pursues the overturning of a myriad of cases because a public defender was high on drugs, the Los Angeles district attorney's office blacklisted both detectives. As a result, the two were demoted to working minor criminal cases for over six months before Dutch struck a deal with ADA Beth Encardi to "control" Claudette in cases she might find morally compromising. When this is revealed Captain Monica Rawling threatened to ruin Encardi's prosecution record and forced the DA's office into removing the blacklisting of the two officers. There was briefly bad blood between Dutch and Claudette but they managed to stay a symbiotic team. At the end of season 4, Dutch turned down a chance to replace Monica Rawling as Captain of the Barn, telling Claudette, to her amusement, that the Chief wanted him "to be the spineless, company yes-man, jellyfish. I told him to shove it."

Since Claudette took over as Captain of the Barn in Season 5, Dutch remains one of the only detectives whose judgment she trusts completely. Dutch asks for a transfer because he can no longer be Claudette's partner. After Lem's murder she denies his request calling Dutch as "my best detective.". In Season 6, the two collaborated in proving that Internal Affairs Lieutenant Jon Kavanaugh had planted evidence implicating Vic Mackey in the murder of Lem. Dutch is briefly conflicted, wanting to allow Mackey to go down for his crimes even if the evidence was falsified. Claudette reminded him that in order to make the Barn better they had to do things the right way.

Claudette's battle with lupus created a strain on their relationship during the final two seasons partly due to Dutch wanting to protect Claudette. Dutch eventually arranges for Danny to become Claudette's full time administrative assistant in order to backstop Claudette. Upon learning of Mackey's immunity deal with ICE, Claudette is enraged. Dutch attempts to console her but she has learned about him trying to resolve Billings's latest stupidity, and she uses this as an excuse to unload her anger on him and shout, "You're fired, you sanctimonious son of a bitch!" Dutch calmly tells her that this isn't her and he gets her to leave the ICE building.

In the final episode, Claudette offhandedly tells Dutch, who ignored her furious termination order from earlier, that she fired him and Dutch says "It didn't take." Claudette gets over herself and finally tells Dutch that she is dying and no medicine can help her now. He asks what he can do and she tells him to just keep doing what he's been doing and that it means a lot to her. She says that she will show up every day until the day when she can work no more. They work together to break a teenaged serial killer while also dealing with the fallout from Vic and Shane's final implosions.

=== Danny Sofer ===
Dutch was initially attracted to patrol officer Danny Sofer. Taking advantage of his attraction, Danny manipulated him into helping her pass an exam that would have resulted in her promotion. After Danny rejected his advances one night after Dutch visited her home to help her prepare for her exam, Dutch lingered long enough to see his nemesis, Vic Mackey arrive and passionately kiss Danny. Dutch's reaction to this was to mutter, "You've got to be shitting me!"

Dutch would ultimately call Danny out on her manipulation in front of the rest of the Barn, when Danny tried to schedule another study session while Dutch was deep in the middle of an investigation of a recently murdered child. The two would eventually settle their differences and apologize to one another for their mutual bad behavior. The two remained close friends as Dutch has continued to mentor Danny unofficially. After a case in Season 2 where Danny assists Dutch with detective work she tries to kiss him. Dutch backs off surprised and embarrassed stating he was in a relationship. Danny later laughs it off with another officer, essentially admitting it was all because of an emotional high.

In Season 6, after Dutch was tricked into watching his longtime crush, Tina Hanlon, have sex with another man, he leaned on Danny for support. As for Danny, she began to see a more mature side to Dutch, who responded to Tina's apology by telling her in a fatherly way that she had no reason to apologize. Later, as Dutch comforted the nephew of a homeless man who had died alone, despite a family which loved him, Danny realized that she had feelings for him. When Danny later found him in the locker room, sobbing over the homeless man's death, she put her arms around him. The scene ended with them kissing passionately. However, the following day, at the start of Season 7, both claimed it was mainly the product of a moment. Afterward, Dutch's friendship with Danny returned to a more platonic state. Dutch eventually successfully persuaded Claudette to appoint Danny as her assistant. As the series wound to a close, Danny stood at Dutch's side during the arrest of Strike Team Detective Ronnie Gardocki.

=== Tina Hanlon ===
Dutch was openly attracted to Tina Hanlon since she began her duty at the Barn, much in the same way he was attracted to Danny. He would come to her defense on several occasions where her inexperience resulted in mistakes and offered his services as a mentor to her. When semi-nude photographs of Tina began circulating around the Barn, Dutch personally began to investigate the source. Much to his surprise, Acting Captain Steve Billings had installed a security camera in the locker room and had carelessly left the photos on his desk where they were stolen and circulated. Billings, who knew of Dutch's attraction to Tina, begged Dutch to help him cover up the potential scandal before Tina could file a possible sexual harassment suit against the department. Ultimately, he pushed a plan to have Dutch begin mentoring Tina, and have Danny and Officer Julien Lowe's attempt have Tina dismissed from the force overruled, in exchange for her silence on the photos. When Claudette found out about the deal upon becoming Captain, she quickly tried to negate the deal Billings had reached. But when she realized that doing so could potentially destroy Dutch's career as well, the arrangement was allowed to continue.

Dutch realized, from a form of "education" he had been given that day, that the deal he had negotiated might make Tina smug. Dutch then told her that she would not be given special treatment, and that she would have to prove she was worth Dutch giving up his time to mentor her. The mentoring was off to a decent start as Dutch began to share some of his knowledge with the young officer.

In the Season 6 episode, "Back to One", Dutch felt envy as Tina admired Strike Team member Ronnie Gardocki while on a meth case bust. Later in the episode, while Dutch and Tina were driving to Dutch's house to examine his archive of investigations, Dutch suggested ordering Chinese food and opening a bottle of wine. Tina, bewildered, asked, "Is this a date?" Dutch nervously responded with "Do you want it to be?"

Shortly after, Tina transferred out of the Farmington precinct to take part in the department's recruitment campaign. Tina returned to the barn a few weeks later. To Dutch's surprise she soon took a liking to Strike Team Leader Kevin Hiatt. Billings, angry with Dutch for his continued blackmail of Billings's vending machines opportunity, arranged for Tina and Hiatt to meet at Tina's place and for Dutch to "accidentally" walk in on them. The end result was Tina having sex with Hiatt, while Dutch watched through the window. The shock of the meeting results in Dutch finally acknowledging that Tina is essentially lost to him and ending his infatuation with her.

Later, while discussing the incident with Danny, Tina described her encounter with Hiatt as "a big mistake." Speaking of Dutch, she said, "He had a chance, he just never took it." When Dutch approached her, she looked ashamed and told him she never wanted to hurt him. But Dutch responded in a fatherly way, telling her that she had nothing to apologize for. As Dutch walked away, Tina's eyes followed him longingly as he walked towards Danny.

She is last seen at The Barn with Julien and other officers celebrating her one year of graduating from police academy and starting her police career, until they are interrupted by a police call and go back to work.

=== Corrine Mackey ===
Dutch also dated Corrine Mackey, Vic's ex-wife, for a short time during season 4. The two dated behind Vic's back and, despite the innocent nature of their relationship, Vic accused Dutch of dating his ex-wife just to spite him. When Corrine confronted Dutch about this accusation, Dutch commented that spiting Vic played a small part in his pursuing her, but he grew to like her. At that revelation, she broke off their relationship, but the two remained friendly, much to Vic's dismay. When Corrine found herself becoming a target of Lt. John Kavanaugh's IAD investigation of the Strike Team, she turned to Dutch for advice. Dutch told her to just tell the truth, which led to Corrine's revealing to Kavanaugh that Vic had given her $65,000 in cash several months prior, to take care of their children's special needs. Dutch also suggested that Corrine curry favor with Kavanaugh, in the belief that her cooperation would lead to Kavanaugh's not following through on his threats to indict Corrine as an accomplice to her husband's crimes. This backfired and led Kavanaugh to freeze Corrine's bank accounts in addition to those of the Strike Team members'. Kavanaugh made it clear to Corrine that she must cooperate with him because she has no choice, due to her status as IAD's leverage over Vic. In response to Kavanaugh's having framed Vic for Lem's murder, an enraged Corinne formally accused Kavanaugh of sexual assault.

In the final season, Corrine turned to Dutch when she had a better grasp of Vic's criminal activities due to Mara Vendrell's revelations about the Strike Team. When Shane and Mara used her as a go-between in their negotiations with Vic, Corrine informed the police through Dutch. When Vic arranged an immunity deal with the Feds, Corrine was horrified that her ex-husband might murder her and the children in retaliation. For this reason, Dutch and Claudette arranged for Corrine and her children to disappear into the Witness Protection Program.

=== Jon Kavanaugh ===
Dutch's relationship with IAD Lt. Jon Kavanaugh was also complicated, especially when he forced Dutch to help him investigate the rape of Kavanaugh's ex-wife. In spite of Kavanaugh using bullying tactics to force Dutch to obey his demands; especially after pulling rank on Dutch, Dutch did seem willing to help Kavanaugh's investigation of Vic and the Strike Team. It was Dutch who alerted Kavanaugh towards the money train heist and Vic's involvement in the robbery. He personally offered to hand over to Kavanaugh his personal notes, outlining the evidence he uncovered linking the Strike Team with the heist. However, the relationship soured when Dutch learned that Kavanaugh's ex-wife, Sadie, had a history of mental illness. Kavanaugh reacted violently, throwing Dutch against a bathroom wall, when Dutch casually asked why Kavanaugh had refused to share such important information with him.

When Dutch ultimately realized that Sadie had faked being raped, Kavanaugh refused to believe him and ordered Dutch to continue to investigate a local sex offender Sadie had identified as her attacker. Though Kavanaugh ultimately was forced to realize Dutch was right, Dutch would renege on his offer to assist him after this negative experience.

Upon beginning his investigation into Lemansky's murder, Dutch was surprised to see Kavanaugh appear in the Barn and seemingly setting up shop again. Upon questioning, he discovered that Kavanaugh was looking into an alternate aspect of Lem's murder, mainly Vic's involvement. During his search for information into the Salvadorans, he looks for Emolia Melendez, Vic and Kavanaugh's former informant. As he nears a possible residence that received a call from Kavanaugh, who informed him that Emolia had sought him out in an attempt to sell him information of Vic's involvement, he gave Dutch a false meeting place, and later gave him the excuse that Emolia changed the meeting place and that he was unable to reach Dutch.

After hearing her testimony, Dutch expressed skepticism about the truth into her story and requested highway footage to check the validity of Kavanaugh's story. What he did not know was that Kavanaugh, in an attempt to protect Emolia's credibility, had already requested that Dutch be pulled off of the case, citing that Dutch's relationship with Vic might have resulted in a conflict of interest.

Before any change could be made, Dutch investigated the footage given to him by the city of the apparent meeting place, disproving the validity of Emolia's story. Combined with allegations by Corrine Mackey of Kavanaugh's abuse of power, plus the apparent fact that the evidence appeared to be "too perfect", Dutch attempted to question Emolia himself about the validity of her story. Kavanaugh ended the interview, but Claudette instead took Emolia for her own interview, resulting in Kavanaugh confessing to his crime of framing Vic for the murder of Lem.

=== The Strike Team ===
Dutch's communication with the Strike Team beyond Vic rotated between assisting them in gang and homicide-related cases on the street, and regular antagonism, due to their loyalty to Vic, who disliked Dutch for the majority of the series and played pranks on the detective. The Strike Team as a collective held both respect and fear for the detective, as they knew his unorthodox criminal profiling techniques and effective investigation methods were a threat to their illegal activities. This was most evident when Dutch began establishing links between the Strike Team and the Armenian Money Train heist.

Shane in particular shared Vic's antagonism against Dutch, bullying him solely because Vic did. Lem was more neutral and playful with Dutch, working together with him with a level of respect as any other fellow police officer. Ronnie hardly interacted with Dutch but when they did it usually involved one of Vic's pranks, such as when Ronnie and Vic planted an unauthorised wire in Dutch's vehicle to watch his mostly unsuccessful attempts to woo his date before he dropped her off while singing "Hungry Like the Wolf".

=== Dark side ===
Because of his unhappy childhood and his treatment as a pariah amongst his fellow detectives, Dutch carries around a great deal of bottled up anger that borders on outright rage. Occasionally, when he has been put through a great deal of stress or frustration, Dutch's containment of these emotions is unleashed, sometimes in very public outbursts.

In the first season, Dutch thoroughly interrogated and psychoanalyzed a man he suspected of being a serial killer. The man then did the same to Dutch with great effectiveness, dwelling on Dutch's lonely and awkward nature. Most of the precinct had no opinion of the man and believed Dutch was wasting his time, and some even found amusement in the man's verbal abuse of Dutch. Eventually, and to the astonishment of the precinct, Dutch exposed the man's guilt and even got him to confess. This gained a completely unexpected applause and accolade from the other officers, including Vic. Later that same night, in a private moment Dutch broke down and cried due to the truth of his attacker's words. On another case, upon discovering that a couple he was defending turned out to be serial killers, Dutch entered one of the Barn's toilet stalls and blamed himself for not saving their victim in time. After contemplating this, moments later Dutch slammed the stall door.

Dutch's dark side became most notable during season three in a controversial sequence where Dutch strangled a stray cat with his bare hands, partly because its caterwauling was constantly keeping him awake, but also to see how it felt to kill another living thing. This act was influenced by Dutch's interrogations of the "cuddler rapist," a serial offender who sexually assaulted senior citizens and eventually graduated to murder.

Season 4 saw another appearance of Dutch's dark side, when he was interrogating another serial killer, in which he described to the suspect, in great detail, what he believed the killer must have felt during the murder. Later in the season, Dutch physically confronted Detective Steve Billings about all of the pranks in the barn pulled on him. After a couple minutes of the altercation, Dutch got the upper hand. When Vic intervened to break up the altercation, Dutch reactively struck him in the face. After he was tossed into a nearby fence, Dutch challeng Vic to a fight, with Claudette putting a stop to it. In the Season 5 premiere "Extraction", Dutch nearly strangles to death a man who tried to push Detective Wyms, his only real friend at the precinct, over the second story railing of the Barn. Dutch has to be physically separated from the attacker by Mackey.

=== Tenure at "The Barn" ===
Dutch declined promotions to stay partnered with Claudette. He once turned down a chance to replace Captain Monica Rawling as Captain of the Barn because of his loyalty to her. Dutch also believed that his superiors only offered the job to him because they felt that Dutch was "a spineless, company yes-man, jellyfish". He turned down an offer to transfer to the LAPD's elite "robbery–homicide" division, which Dutch once commented was his dream assignment. He later learned that the offer was arranged by Claudette, who wanted to get rid of Dutch so that he would not have to worry about her terminal lupus, when she had recently experienced a debilitating flare-up. When Claudette fell down a flight of stairs at the Barn and her condition suddenly became known in the department, Claudette furiously accused Dutch of being the one who told her superiors but it was Billings. He requested a transfer a few days later, partly because of his new assignment with Billings, but also because he was no longer with his long-term partner. His transfer was denied in the wake of Lemansky's murder, with Claudette stating, "I need my best detective on this".

=== The end ===
As the series wound to a close, it was implied that Dutch planned to stay at the Barn as Claudette's right-hand man. He also met the oft-mentioned but not previously seen Ellen Carmichael, Steve Billings's attorney, who swiftly developed a romantic interest in Dutch. After arranging an end to Steve Billings's lawsuit, Ellen (who is played by Jay Karnes's real life wife) left Dutch her business card, asking him to call her soon.

=== In popular culture ===
- Jay Karnes later played an Internal Affairs officer also named "Wagenbach" in "For Gedda", an episode of CSI: Crime Scene Investigation.

== Curtis Lemansky ==
Curtis Lemansky
- The Shield character
- First appearance: "Pilot" (episode 1.01)
- Last appearance: "Postpartum" (episode 5.11) (Death) "Wins and Losses" (flashback, funeral)
- Created by: Shawn Ryan
- Portrayed by: Kenny Johnson

In-universe information
- Nicknames: Lemonhead, Lem
- Gender: Male
- Title(s): Former detective; Strike Team member
- Occupation: Former police officer

Curtis Lemansky, more commonly known as "Lem" or "Lemonhead", is a fictional police detective on the FX original drama The Shield, played by actor Kenny Johnson.

=== Background and personal life ===
Little is known about Lemansky outside of his job as a Strike Team member, except that his surname is of Polish origin. In one of the series DVD commentaries, Michael Chiklis mentions that all of the characters are from the same areas the actors are from, implying that Lemansky was originally from New Haven, Connecticut. Lem's tombstone, shown in season 6, indicates he was born in 1963.

In season 1, he has a relationship with Tigre Orozco, the sister of a reformed gangbanger and in season 5, Ronnie Gardocki implies that Lem's parents were "trailer trash" and so poor that the Strike Team didn't even bother asking them to help post bail for Lem after his arrest by Internal Affairs. Lemansky is the go-to member of the Strike Team for providing first aid.

=== Role in Strike Team ===
As the "point man" for the Strike Team, Lem is the vanguard during an assault scenario. He leads the team in and clears the room of possible assailants. Due to this role, he is equipped with a compact shotgun as his primary firearm.

=== Personality ===
Lem is the moral compass of the Strike Team. A good-natured detective, he was recruited after being vouched for by his good friend, Detective Shane Vendrell. Lem's main mode of transport when off-duty is a low-rider motorcycle ("chopper"), and he is active in arm wrestling tournaments. Well liked by many for his loyal and selfless personality, he is the "muscle" and "point man" of the Strike Team. Lem and his teammate, Detective Ronnie Gardocki, were not included in the plot by the team leader Vic Mackey and team member Shane Vendrell to kill Detective Terry Crowley, due to Lem's conscientious nature. Upon hearing of Terry's death, the visibly distraught Lem shouts, "No!", and punches through a van window, severely lacerating his right fist and surprising Vic.

Lem further shows his strong convictions later in season 1, in the episode "Throwaway", which showcases Lem's strong sense of morality, his willingness to help others, and his need to do the right thing, which causes Lem to frequently get under Vic and Shane's skin.

Lem finds himself increasingly troubled by the Strike Team's illegal activities, which he is constantly getting dragged into. He was the first to object to the plan to rob the Armenian mob's "money train" (money laundering operation). The rest of the team originally planned a three-man assault, excluding Lem, but he reluctantly went along with the decision for the sake of team unity.

Lem is highly empathetic and is spurred into action whenever he sees human or animal suffering. For example, he is often seen performing CPR on blood and vomit covered victims while the rest of his team members look on disgustedly. Highly fond of animals, he's often seen playing with them, whether cockerels saved from a cockfight or a suspect's pet pit bull. Once, when raiding a suspect's house, he was visibly distraught and upset with Shane for shooting and killing a pit bull terrier.

Despite being a "dirty cop", Lem is a genuinely caring person and even joins the Youth Authority to help wayward juveniles after the Strike Team is disbanded at the end of season 3. Even when on the run, the events that led his eventual murder stemmed from his trying to comfort an injured child, which resulted in his cover being blown and the discovery of his hideout.

Lem states on many occasions that he considers the Strike Team to be his family, and it was the sole reason why he put aside his moral objections and joined in on the team's various illegal schemes. In the season 3 finale, he tells Vic, Ronnie, and Shane that they are the closest thing to a family he has ever known; the three men are visibly touched by the revelation.

One example of the above is when Lt. Kavanaugh of Internal Affairs tries to coerce Lem to rat on the Strike Team. Lem replies, "You're asking me to betray my family", and steadfastly refuses to budge from his decision. Kavanaugh expresses admiration for Lem's loyalty and steadfastness.

A day before Lem is to be imprisoned, Kavanaugh shows up at his doorstep to have a final chat with him saying, “...you weren't supposed to get the worst of this thing here”. Kavanaugh voices his regret that Lem is the one who ended up being the most affected by his inquiry into the Strike Team. He merely planned to scare Lem with the threat of jail so he could use it as leverage to get him to rat on the Strike Team.

Regaining his composure, Kavanaugh extends his hand to Lem and says, “...any man'd be lucky to have you in his corner.” After a pregnant pause, Lem reaches out and grasps Kav's hand in a conciliatory manner, but tells Kav to stop pursuing matters further. It ends with him. They shake hands, and Kav leaves after wishing Lem good luck and telling him to take care of himself.

Although his character is morally conflicted, there are numerous examples of Lem's willingness, even eagerness, to bend or break the law in the best interests of the team. His agreement with the decision to kill Margos Dezerian, his involvement in the murder of Armadillo Quintero, and the set-up of Hector Estanza are but a few.

=== Name contention ===
Much like fellow character Danielle "Danny" Sofer, there has been debate over the character's name among viewers. While the character's given name is 'Curtis Lemansky', the character is generally referred to as 'Lem' or 'Lemonhead'. This is a play both on the character's last name and the fact that actor Kenny Johnson has blonde hair.

The early episodes heavily use the 'Lemonhead' nickname (also used by the writing staff, who still refer to the character by that name in the shooting scripts). However, in later Season One episodes, the character is referred to by the shorter 'Lem'. Eventually, 'Lem' became the de facto name for the character from Season Two onwards. However, the 'promosode' between seasons 5 and 6 (albeit set some time before the events of season 5) have his fellow officers chanting 'Lemonhead' when he won the arm wrestling championship.

=== The case of the dead rapper ===
Lem was first given the spotlight in the fourth episode of the first season, "Dawg Days". The episode saw Lem and patrol Officer Danielle Sofer moonlighting as security at a local night club where two rappers and their gang-related entourages engage in a brawl. When Sofer is ambushed on the street by one of the entourage members, Lem and Detective Vic Mackey step in to try and defuse the war between the two rappers, culminating in Vic locking the two musicians in a freight container together for the night and telling them to either resolve their differences peacefully or kill each other off. The next morning Vic and Lem arrive to find that one of the rappers has murdered the other. It was at this point that Lem offers to dispose of the body of the slain rapper for Vic.

=== The money train ===
Lem was involved in the money train robbery and was the member of the Strike Team most fearful for their safety after the robbery was completed. He began to behave in an extremely paranoid way, particularly after it was discovered that some of the money was not only marked, but had been released back into circulation. Though he did mellow a bit when the money was purged of marked notes and a known criminal named Neil O'Brien given some of the tagged money, Lem's terror reached new heights when O'Brien was found murdered and the team was forced to dispose of his body.

Lem began voicing his concerns to his fellow Strike Team members, which led to a dramatic moment where Lem, without any warning, leaned over and began vomiting blood out of his mouth. Shocked, Lem confessed that the stress of hiding the money train loot and the group's various morally questionable actions had resulted in his developing potentially fatal ulcer problems. While Ronnie and Vic realized the severity of Lem's health problems and wisely backed off from attacking him for his critical comments, Shane refused to show concern for Lem and angrily attacked him for being scared.

However, when it was discovered that the Armenian mob had their identities and photos, Lem stole the remaining cash from the money train and burned most of it, believing that he was protecting the team. Lem, as it turned out, believed that so long as the Strike Team possessed the money, the group would forever be hounded by those parties looking for the stolen loot. Lem's decision ultimately was the breaking point for his friendship with Shane Vendrell.

Shane refused Vic's attempt at a reconciliation with the team and accused Vic and Ronnie of hating Lem as much as he did. Lem quit the group as a direct result and this triggered a confrontation between Shane and Vic that led to the Strike Team dissolving.

=== Return to the barn ===
After the team was broken up, Lem transferred to a different agency and began to work with juvenile offenders. However, he soon found himself missing his friends Vic and Ronnie. It was heavily implied that the two had come to a sort of understanding with Lem regarding his departure from the Strike Team after Shane's antics. As a result, Vic and Ronnie contacted Lem and revealed to him that Shane seemed to have developed a relationship with drug and gang lord Antwon Mitchell and that the entire team was at risk if Shane used the team to bargain a deal should he get caught by IAD. Afterwards, Lem began to pass relevant information to Vic that he obtained via his contacts with various juvenile offenders to ensure that Vic could stay informed to Shane's actions. Ultimately Vic convinced Lem to work with him in the newly reformed Strike Team in order to keep closer tabs on Shane, which created conflict with Lem since this meant that he would be unable to transfer back to the Barn due to the animosity still between him and Shane.

Things came to a head when Lem came up with information that led to a massive drug bust, severely crippling Mitchell's business. When his 14-year-old informant Angie suddenly went missing after having provided information that led to the bust, Lem became immediately suspicious of Shane. He openly accused both Shane and Vic of working for Mitchell and being responsible for Angie's death. In order to prove himself, Vic let Lem back into his inner circle and arranged for his transfer back to the Barn. Vic also revealed some incriminating footage from a bug planted in Shane's car; this showed how he knew of an earlier confrontation between Shane and Lem that ended with Shane, once Lem had left camera range, openly lamenting the fact that the two former best friends had turned into mortal enemies.

=== Theft of heroin ===
During the search for Angie, who they learn was murdered by Antwon Mitchell, Lem raided a criminal informant's house in search of information. One of the residents of the home had a package of heroin and Lem stole it in order to provide leverage for information concerning Angie's disappearance. However, Lem's theft was seen by Emolia Melendez, a police informant, who subsequently reported it to Internal Affairs. The heroin was confiscated from Lem's car during the night and replaced with a fake bundle. Though this initially caused some trouble, the affair was put behind them and eventually the Strike Team came back together. Shane and Lem both reconciled after Lem was attacked by the hands of a trio of criminals who had intel on the location of a Salvadoran drug kingpin.

=== Internal affairs ===
In Season 5, the theft of the heroin would come back to haunt Lem. Using the brick as evidence, IAD Lieutenant Kavanaugh used this evidence as leverage to make Lem wear a listening device, primarily to gather evidence about the Strike Team's role in the death of a police officer, Terry Crowley. Kavanaugh stated he would imprison Lem for not only the drug theft but also for intent to sell the drugs, which would potentially land Lem in jail for 10 years. Kavanaugh also interrogated Lem about the murder of Detective Crowley. To Kavanaugh's amusement, Lem revealed that he was not involved in the plot. Kavanaugh decided to use this knowledge as a way to drive a wedge between Lem and Vic. Lem pretended to go along with Kavanaugh's plan, but managed to secretly tip off his friend Vic by staging a fight between the two that temporarily disabled the listening device and allowed him to inform Vic of what had happened. He also confronted Vic about Terry's death and when Vic hesitated before responding, Lem refused to let Vic answer the question, knowing that the answer would mean that Vic was responsible.

Despite this, Vic worked diligently to save Lem from Kavanaugh's clutches and ultimately convinced Lem that Terry's death was only indirectly Vic's fault due to him accidentally dropping his guard during the raid. With Lem's help, the team tried to outmaneuver Kavanaugh, which successfully resulted in Kavanaugh's humiliation during a botched sting operation. During a raid on a Salvadoran grenade factory, Lem heroically saved Kavanaugh from an active grenade tossed in his direction by rushing to grab the grenade and throwing it away from Kavanaugh seconds before it exploded. Kavanaugh responded to this act of selfless bravery by continuing to pressure Lem into turning against the Strike Team. Lem sharply refused to turn his back on his friends as Vic confronted Kavanaugh's cold treatment towards Lem, who could have easily let Kavanaugh be killed by the grenade but had risked his life to save him.

=== Arrest ===
Things came to a head when Vic and Lem entered the security monitor room to have a private conversation only to see via the monitors, a rather private conversation between Kavanaugh and Kavanaugh's distraught, mentally ill ex-wife. Viewing their disturbingly private moment on the closed-circuit television, Vic remarked that they had found Kavanaugh's weakness. Kavanaugh eventually noticed the security camera in the room and the possibility that his conversation with his wife was being observed by his enemies led him to rush out of the interrogation room. While Vic and Lem fled the room before Kavanaugh could catch the two red-handed, the now enraged Kavanaugh ordered that Lem be arrested for possession of heroin with intent to distribute. Lem was handcuffed in front of his shocked fellow officers, placed in lockup with other criminals, processed, and sent to a detention center. Unknown to Lem at the time, Kavanaugh had seemingly arranged for him to serve time at the same prison as gang leader Antwon Mitchell, who wanted to have him murdered while in custody. Lem's bail was set at one-hundred thousand dollars while most of the Strike Team's assets were frozen under suspicion of lawlessness. This led the remaining three Strike Team members to turn to their friend Smitty to bail Lem out, using money they stole from a small-time pot dealer as bail money.

=== The plea ===
Lem soon became weary of just not knowing what would happen to the others, and the fears started aggravating his ulcer problem. In a move to seal the rest of the team off from prosecution, he pleaded guilty to theft under color of authority to serve 18 months before parole of a 5-year sentence. Although he and the team came to realize that being sent to the same prison as Antwon Mitchell was an idle threat, they still had to deal with Mitchell's One-Niner gang being spread across almost all California prisons; Lem's life would be at risk either way. Further, even if Lem did manage to survive 18 months, he would have to be dealing with constant conflict with One-Niners, making it unlikely he would qualify for early release. As Vic struck a deal with Mitchell to keep Lem safe, Lem entered the official plea, much to Kavanaugh's dismay. As the investigation came to a close, Kavanaugh paid Lem a final visit to apologize and explained that he had always thought Lem would finally give up Vic; he never wanted Lem to go to prison. He told Lem that, "...any man would be lucky to have you in his corner".

=== Death ===
Soon after the plea was entered, however, Vic found that Kavanaugh had played his last card, starting an investigation of Lompoc Federal Penitentiary, which was causing Antwon to lose all the creature comforts he'd enjoyed. Additionally, Kavanaugh told Mitchell that Vic had been bragging about getting the better of Antwon, and a furious Mitchell told Vic that Lem was dead as soon as he came into the system. Desperate to save his friend from certain death, Vic convinced Lem to skip town on the eve of his court date, where he would plead guilty and be sent to prison. Vic prepared to transport the fugitive Lem to Mexico to hide after the group were told that Lem's original deal was now null and void and that the only way for him to receive any break in terms of sentencing would be if he gave up the Strike Team. Meanwhile, Kavanaugh convinced Councilman Aceveda to go to Vic and to lie about Lem agreeing to turn against the Strike Team in exchange for a new plea bargain in order to try and track the Strike Team to Lemansky. Vic refused to accept Aceveda's lie and continued to believe that Lem had not betrayed the Strike Team. Meanwhile, Lem was forced to abandon Vic's original plans for hiding him after he risked his freedom to help out a young child who had been left alone by his parents and had seriously hurt himself in his home's kitchen. Lem ultimately contacted Vic and arranged for a meeting with his friends, with Vic preparing the final details to get Lem across the border and into hiding.

However, Kavanaugh used Aceveda to imply to Vic that Lem had revealed information about the "Money Train." Upon learning this, Shane Vendrell secretly decided to kill his friend using a stolen grenade in order to prevent Lem from implicating the team in any illegal activities. While Vic and Ronnie were occupied with losing the IAD officers tailing their vehicles, Shane, who was not being tailed, was able to meet up with Lem and whisk him away to an abandoned garage.

Shane made one last-ditch effort to convince Lem to go along with Vic's plan to relocate him to Mexico but Lem flat out refused to go into hiding. Lem argued that fleeing to Mexico, cut off from his friends and isolated from the rest of the world would be worse than prison. Shane brought Lem a sandwich to his car and quietly dropped a grenade in the front seat, killing Lemansky. When the smoke cleared from the explosion, Lemansky survived long enough to see Shane break down emotionally and cry for him. After Shane's emotional break a few seconds later, Lem died. Upon his former colleagues finding out, Every cop in the Barn rushed to the scene of his death, stating "Officer Down. He was unmarried without children."

=== Fallout from death ===
Upon arriving at the abandoned garage where Lem's body was found, a distraught Vic attempted to touch the dead body of Lem only to be stopped by Dutch, who reminded Vic that touching Lem's body would contaminate the crime scene. Kavanaugh, in a bitter tone, repeatedly asked Vic if he was happy that Lem was dead (since Lem's death effectively closed the IAD investigation of the Strike Team). Vic responded by charging at Kavanaugh and the two men fought for a few seconds before being torn apart by the various patrol officers who had arrived at the crime scene in respect for Lem.

Claudette assigned Dutch, her "best detective", to investigate the murder with it implied that Claudette suspects that Lem was murdered by the Salvadoran mob. Salvadorans had been using grenades to kill their enemies and the Strike Team had successfully shut down several of the syndicate's operations.

As Vic was led away by Ronnie and Shane, Vic vowed to find and kill those responsible. As Vic walks off camera, the shot focuses on a clearly distraught Shane following him.

In the 15 minute "promosode" for Bud.TV it was revealed that Lem did not receive a motorcade or police funeral. Claudette informed Vic that she was told that Lem's lack of a department funeral and motorcade would prevent news headlines about Lem's "dirty dealings". However, the sixth-season premiere showed in fact that the heroin fiasco was featured prominently both in the newspapers and in a televised statement by Councilman David Aceveda, where he assured the public that the department wouldn't tolerate corruption. He eventually got his 21 gun salute from Vic, Ronnie, and Shane.

After finding out Vendrell was the real killer, Mackey and Gardocki sought to avenge Lemansky by setting up Vendrell's murder. Shane survived the attempt, however, and set up both of them to be murdered for revenge. Mackey and Gardocki both survived, and this enmity fueled the rest of the series. Earlier in the season, Mackey appeared willing to let Vendrell walk away from the repercussions, but Gardocki pressed him to end the Shane problem once and for all, saying "I'm sick of walking around half the day smiling at a guy who put a grenade in Lem's lap". When Mackey seeks to call off Shane's assassination, Gardocki uses his position as Strike Team leader to prevent it.

In the series finale, Vic is seen placing a picture of himself and Lem on his new desk at ICE headquarters. Though originally, the picture was of all four members of the Strike Team, Vic seems to have cropped Shane and Ronnie out of the frame, unable to reconcile himself with Shane's betrayal of Lem and subsequent suicide and his own betrayal of Ronnie, leaving his friendship with Lem as the only one "untarnished" in his mind.

== Supporting characters ==
=== A ===
- Aurora Aceveda (Camillia Sanes)

=== B ===
- Tom Bankston (Ron Canada)
- Guillermo Beltran (Francesco Quinn)
- Steve Billings (David Marciano)
- Waylon Burke (Gareth Williams)

=== C ===
- Ray Carlson (Matt Corboy)
- Joe Clark (Carl Weathers)
- Terry Crowley (Reed Diamond)

=== D ===
- Margos Dezerian (Kurt Sutter)
- Becca Doyle (Laura Harring)
- Rita Dressler (Frances Fisher)

=== E ===
- Alex Eznik (Shaun Duke)

=== G ===
- Santi Galas
- Kleavon Gardner (Ray Campbell)
- Tavon Garris (Brian White)
- Trish George (Nicki Micheaux)
- Ben Gilroy (John Diehl)

=== H ===
- Wayne "Scooby" Haimes (Robert Wu)
- Tina Hanlon (Paula Garces)
- Kevin Hiatt (Alex O'Loughlin)
- Tommy Hisk (Matt Gerald)
- Hagop (David Caprita)
- Hrach (Aron Kader)

=== J ===
- Paul Jackson (Frank Grillo)
- Chief Johnson (John Cygan)

=== K ===
- Jon Kavanaugh (Forest Whitaker)
- Sadie Kavanaugh (Gina Torres)
- Diro Kesakhian (Franka Potente)

=== L ===
- Diagur Leyva (Frankie Rodriguez)
- Guardo Lima (Luis Antonio Ramos)
- Kern Little (Sticky Fingaz)
- Juan Lozano (Kurt Caceres)

=== M ===
- Jorge Machado (Efrain Figueroa)
- Cassidy Mackey (Autumn Chiklis)
- Corrine Mackey (Cathy Cahlin Ryan)
- Matthew Mackey (Joel Rosenthal) and (Jack Weber)
- Megan Mackey
- Emolia Melendez (Onahoua Rodriguez)
- Carl Miller (Jarvis W. George)
- Antwon Mitchell (Anthony Anderson)
- Moses (L. Michael Burt)
- Tomas Motyashik (Brent Roam)
- Olivia Murray (Laurie Holden)

=== O ===
- Theodore "T.O." Osmond (Cedric Pendleton)

=== P ===
- Cruz Pezuela (F. J. Rio)
- Roy Phillips (Nigel Gibbs)
- Annie Price (Aisha Hinds)

=== Q ===
- Armadillo Quintero (Daniel Pino)

=== R ===
- Armando "Army" Renta (Michael Pena)
- Connie Reisler (Jamie Brown)
- Ellis Rezian (Ludwig Manukian)
- Rickey (Wilmer Calderon)
- Rondell Robinson (Walter Emanuel Jones)

=== S ===
- Kail Saffian (Vahe Bejan)
- Mara Sewell-Vendrell (Michele Hicks)
- Lee Sofer

=== W ===
- Halpern White (Laurence Mason)

=== Z ===
- Ari Zadofian (Raff Anoushian)

== Police ==
=== Tom Bankston ===
- Portrayed by Ron Canada
- Appears in "Coyotes", "Breakpoint", "Dominoes Falling" and "Blood and Water"

Chief Bankston is the former LAPD Chief of Police, who started after the Gilroy scandal. He was eventually replaced by Chief Johnson. Bankston was not happy with Aceveda's performance and planned to fire him if he lost the election for City Council. Aceveda won and Bankston allowed him six months more on the job and suggested to Claudette that she replace Aceveda as captain.

=== Steve Billings ===
- Portrayed by David Marciano
- Appears in "The Cure", "Grave", "Bang", "Tar Baby", "Cut Throat", "String Theory", "A Thousand Deaths", "Judas Priest", "Extraction", "Enemy of Good", "Jailbait", "Tapa Boca", "Trophy", "Rap Payback", "Man Inside", "Kavanaugh", "Smoked", "Of Mice and Lem", "Postpartum", "On the Jones", "Baptism by Fire", "Back to One", "The New Guy", "Haunts", "Chasing Ghosts", "Exiled", "The Math of the Wrath", "Recoil", "Spanish Practices", "Coefficient of Drag", "Snitch", "Money Shot", "Genocide", "Game Face", "Animal Control", "Bitches Brew", "Parricide", "Moving Day", "Party Line", "Petty Cash", "Possible Kill Screen", and "Family Meeting"

Billings is an underhanded detective who routinely takes credit for Dutch and Claudette's detective work in season four, while the two are blacklisted by the DA's office. When Dutch discovers that Billings stood by and watched a murder take place out of cowardice, his attempt at blackmail ends with the two detectives attacking each other. Later, after Monica Rawling is fired, Billings is promoted to acting captain. Despite being a powerless figurehead, Billings is able to maintain a working relationship with Vic, giving him total control of the Strike Team in exchange for fast results and for keeping his fellow officers from revolting against Billings. Near the end of season 5, Billings is removed as captain by the chief of police and is replaced by Claudette Wyms. He becomes a detective once again and is partnered with Dutch. It is also revealed that Billings is the owner of the vending machines, which had been an often-featured subplot during the season. Billings regards his partnership with Dutch to be a mutually beneficial relationship, as he believes that both he and Dutch negate the others weaknesses. Billings also thoroughly enjoyed working with Ronnie Gardocki on a meth distribution bust, even going as far as to comment that he would "like to log in some Strike Team time", much to Dutch's amusement.

Tension between Billings and Dutch began to rise, over Dutch's continuing blackmail over the vending machines, resulting in Billings setting up Tina with Hiatt and arranging for Dutch to meet under the assumption of a dinner date at Tina's house. Billings watched with amusement as the lovestruck Dutch arrived with a bottle of wine, only to witness the pair having sex and being spotted by Hiatt.

At the end of Season 6, Billings informs the department that he is suing the city for over $3.4 million, stating that injuries sustained from hitting a desk during a fight between Vic Mackey and Jon Kavanaugh resulted in headaches and sensitivity to light. In spite of the fact that he has informed Dutch of the headaches, Claudette feels that Billings is merely attempting to defraud the city out of millions and informs him it is a crime to do so.

For all his faults, Billings is portrayed as a devoted family man, especially toward his two young daughters. Billings also shows zero tolerance to those who exploit children, yelling at a father whose late daughter had run away because of her father's molestation: "Your daughter is dead! You molested her, she ran away, and you got her killed!", before storming off in anger. He has also been shown to have better decorum with female victims than Dutch.

=== Waylon Burke ===
- Portrayed by Gareth Williams
- Appears in "Bottom Bitch", "Streaks and Tips", "Safe", "Cracking Ice", "Slipknot" and "Fire in the Hole"

Waylon heads up the Decoy Squad, a team of undercover officers brought in to serve at the Barn under Claudette Wyms. Waylon develops a semi-friendly rivalry with Vic Mackey when they are assigned to the Strike Team's room. When he loses a bet with Vic and is required to streak through the Barn, he is far from modest. He becomes furious with Claudette when she neglects a memo about a mole when ordering a wiretap and puts Waylon's teammate Trish George in danger. Because of this, he requests for his team to be transferred out of the Barn. Waylon still remains a friendly adversary for the Strike Team as he passed information about Antwon Mitchell's whereabouts to Lem in season 4.

=== Carlos Zamora ===
- Portrayed by Carlos Sanz
- Appears in "Pay in Pain"

Carlos was a member of The Toros in his youth. After getting out of the gang, he joined the LAPD and became a detective. Carlos was in charge of the case of the murder at Nacho's gun shop. Assistant Chief Ben Gilroy decided to put Vic Mackey and Shane Vendrell in it as well. After being introduced they walked out of the shop and Carlos started comforting gang member Train Guttierez, whose pregnant girlfriend was one of the victims. Mackey argued with his method of befriending the gang members, but Carlos told him that building trust with them worked. After interrogating one of the gang members, Mackey told Carlos to look for the missing janitor while he went to talk with Wet Willie. After that, a gang member called Carlos and told him where he could find Jaime.

After Mackey talked with Wet Willie, Carlos told him about Jaime and they went to talk with him. After some convincing, Jaime told them that the killer didn't belong to any gang and that he was white. Carlos and Vic went to the Barn and told Gilroy what they had found. They then met with Latino activist Raoul Jimenez who demanded action. Although Vic disagreed, Carlos vouched for the LAPD to release the sketch they had drawn with Jaime's description.

Carlos then received information that the killer had started another shooting in a grocery store. He looked for Vic and they went there. After being briefed by Officer Danny Sofer, they went to talk with the owner of the store, Leon, whose son was among the victims. He told them that he managed to hit the killer with a baseball bat but didn't know which way he left. After they found the killer's car parked outside, they managed to identify him as George Michael Klassen. They then went to his house only to find his in-laws shot to death, but no signs of George or his wife and son. As Vic questioned George's sister, Carlos ordered the officers to canvass the area.

Vic and Carlos returned to the Barn to brief Gilroy on the case. Carlos told him that they had George's name and picture all over the city, and they were watching over his friends to see if he appeared. Vic left alone to try to do something else and returned with all the shop owners to corroborate their stories. As he met with Carlos and Gilroy upstairs, Carlos blasted him for pressing on a grieving father. After a brief verbal fight, Vic went to interrogate Leon while Carlos checked with the other store owners. As he got nothing, he went with Vic to continue pressing Leon. Eventually Leon confessed that he had captured George, and together with the other store owners, they gave him to The Toros for revenge. Vic and Carlos then ran out to see if they could find him before they kill him.

Carlos and Vic went back to Lucas and asked him where they had taken George and his family. He refused to talk and Vic threatened to beat him. Lucas told him that Carlos wouldn't let him be beat, but instead Carlos hit him in the guts and asked him again where George was. After he gave them their location, they went to find Train Guttierez had George tied, while he molested his wife. As they broke in the house, Train took Myra hostage and shot George in the head. After Vic injured him so he could release Myra, Carlos went on top of him and put a gun on his mouth angered by his actions. Vic managed to pull him off as they took care of the family.

Back at the Barn they wondered what would happen to the shop owners. Raoul Jimenez assured them that they wouldn't spend one day in jail, but Vic reminded him that they conspired to commit murder. Carlos then left and Vic offered him a ride, but he politely refused it.

=== Ray Carlson ===
- Portrayed by Matt Corboy
- Appears in "Cherrypoppers", "Dragonchasers", "Carnivores", "Two Days of Blood", "Circles", "Dead Soldiers", "Partners", "Greenlit", "Homewrecker", "Barnstormers", "Coyotes", "Inferno", "Breakpoint", "Dominoes Falling", "Playing Tight", "Wins and Losses", "Coefficient of Drag" and "Money Shot"

A police officer from the Farmington station, who appeared to make immature jokes, and was usually accompanied by his equally childish partner, Officer Paul Jackson (Frank Grillo). After a transvestite bit Danny Sofer and there was concern she could have contracted HIV from it, Carlson and Jackson helped Officer Julien Lowe orchestrate a "blanket party" beating of the transvestite. When Julien was nearly outed as a homosexual by his former lover Tomas, Carlson and Jackson put up posters ridiculing him. The harassment results in their being fired from the department.

Angry over their dismissal, Carlson and Jackson ambush and beat Julian, assisted by several accomplices. When Julien recovers from the attack, he assaults Carlson and breaks his arm.

Carlson returned in the seventh season as a private security specialist whom Vic hires to watch over his family. He seems to be significantly more mature and responsible.

=== Terry Crowley ===
- Portrayed by Reed Diamond
- Appears in "Pilot", "Our Gang", "Co-Pilot" and "Smoked"

As a new detective, Terry Crowley was placed into Vic's unit by Aceveda to be a possible replacement if Vic didn't work out. He was to keep tabs on the team's illegal activities. Ben Gilroy, however, informs Vic of this plan, but didn't expect Vic to take such drastic measures to protect the strike team. To keep Terry from turning them in, Vic murders him with Shane as a witness; the other team members, Lem and Ronnie, are not involved in his murder. When Vic, Shane, and Terry entered a room in the house of a drug dealer, Vic and Shane shot and killed the drug dealer after being fired upon. Vic, as Shane looked on, then picked up the drug dealer's gun and fired at Terry, making it appear to investigators that Terry had been shot by the drug dealer. The bullet impacted Terry's face and exited out the back of his head. Terry remained conscious long enough to look up at Vic Mackey and realize what had happened to him. The injury was fatal, but Terry did not die until shortly after his arrival at the hospital. Mackey would later express remorse on several occasions over Crowley's death.

Although he was killed in the pilot episode, the effects of his murder continue through the series, as Vic's superiors try to pin Crowley's murder on him on more than one occasion (although no one could prove the dirty deed was done by Vic).

Years later, fearing that Lem would testify against the team, Shane used a grenade—taken from an earlier raid on the Salvadorans—to murder his team member and friend. Some time after killing Guardo Lima and "avenging" Lem, Vic read one of John Kavanaugh's files and suspected Shane of killing Lem and that he killed the wrong man. When Vic learns the truth about Shane's murder of Lem, Vic confronts Shane, who compares the murder of Lem with the one of Terry, and tells him that if he ever sees him again, he would kill him. Shane drives off, calling Vic a hypocrite. Fearing that Vic will try to kill him, Shane writes a confession about the murder which he claims will be delivered to the authorities if he is hurt.

In the penultimate episode Terry's murder is the first of the crimes Vic confesses to in exchange for an immunity deal. In the final episode, the whole Barn became aware of what Vic and Shane, who poisons his son and pregnant wife and then killed himself, did to Terry Crowley. As a result, Ronnie was sent to prison for all the crimes the Strike Team had committed for the past three years, despite not being part of the murder plot.

=== Tavon Garris ===
- Portrayed by Brian White
- Appears in "Coyotes", "Inferno", "Breakpoint", "Dominoes Falling", "Playing Tight", "Blood and Water", "Bottom Bitch", "Streaks and Tips", "Fire in the Hole", "All In" and "Animal Control"

A late addition to the Strike Team, Tavon was made an official fifth member of the team after department and political demands pressured the Barn to transfer over a minority member to be put on the all Caucasian team. Tavon exhibited intelligence and cunning in his undercover and street work, and eventually revealed a tendency for brutality when the case called for it, impressing and surprising Vic. Tavon even participated in an illegal wire tap set up by the Strike Team. Early on, Tavon was approached discreetly by a civilian auditor to try to find dirt on the team. While it initially seemed that Tavon had agreed to do so, he later revealed to the auditor in a sarcastic manner that there was nothing to tell and to find someone else to rat. Although the team mostly kept him in the dark and separate from their illegal activities and regular conversations, Lem and Vic eventually warmed up to him after Tavon continuously proved his effectiveness and loyalty in their street-work. Vic eventually began grooming Tavon to become a potential protege and permanent fifth member of the team, one who could eventually be trusted with the team's illegal side activities.

However, Shane and Tavon soon developed a deep rivalry based on Shane's jealousy and inherent racist beliefs, and Tavon's increasing involvement and partnership with Vic. When Tavon approached Vic to push for more involvement and a more prominent leadership position alongside him in the Strike Team, Vic was visibly contemplating the possibility. However, Tavon brought up the issue of Shane and Vic instructed Tavon to smooth things out with him as to avoid any leadership conflict. The attempted mediation instead turned violent when Tavon went to Shane's apartment and began antagonising each other. Shane eventually insulted Tavon's worth, and Tavon took serious offence when Shane resorted to racial insults, telling him to "know his place". This was further aggravated when Shane called him a 'darkie'. A violent fight then broke out in Shane's apartment, with Tavon kneeing Shane in between the legs and beating him severely to the point of blood. Only because of the intervention of Shane's fiancé, Mara, did the fight turn from violent to extremely dangerous, as she snuck up behind Tavon and hit him in the back of the head with an iron, causing visible head trauma and lack of co-ordination in Tavon's reaction. Tavon barely stumbled away and left in his van, but in his impaired condition he crashed into a parked car, leaving him in a coma. Only Lem expressed concern for Tavon's hospitalisation, and was the only member of the Strike Team to make an effort to visit him. To protect Shane's position, Vic and a reluctant Lem convinced Tavon that he nearly killed Mara in his furious rage. Tavon, in his poor physical and mental state, broke down in tears when Lem pressed the lie. He did not return to the team in the aftermath of the investigation, remaining in and out of hospital for several years.

Tavon's ultimate fate was unknown until the final season. Three years later, Tavon had mostly recovered from his serious bodily injuries, and returned to the police force working out of North Hollywood division. His face and neck still bore the scars from the fight and high-speed car-crash he endured. Tavon met with the Strike Team one final time just before their official demise, to the surprise of Vic, Ronnie and Shane. Tavon offered his condolences for Lem and made peace with Vic and Ronnie. Tavon then asked Shane for assistance regarding a past victim who only trusted Shane. After the case was closed, Tavon aggressively confronted him and revealed that he remembered everything about their fight, and that he never hit Mara, shaming the cowardly Shane and walking away from their violent history for the last time, satisfied and at peace.

=== Trish George ===
- Portrayed by Nicki Micheaux
- Appears in "Bottom Bitch", "Streaks and Tips", "Posse Up", "Safe", "Cracking Ice", "Slipknot" and "Fire in the Hole"

Trish George is a member of the Decoy Squad, a team of undercover officers brought in to serve at the Barn under Claudette Wyms. She was effectively Waylon's second-in-command, as displayed in her involvement with his planning and their undercover operations. Trish was flirtatious with some of the Barn's officers and seemed to be attracted to Vic, with the two exchanging suggestive sexual innuendo and flirtatious conversations in between cases, such as when Trish was required to streak through the Barn when Waylon lost a playful bet with Vic. Their potential relationship never developed because Vic became involved with an old flame.

Trish's undercover work was compromised when Claudette Wyms neglected a memo about a mole when ordering a wiretap and thus put Trish in immediate danger. Waylon became furious and tried to pull her out of the undercover investigation to no avail. In order for her to maintain her cover, she had sex with a would-be killer and was pressured to try cocaine by him. The man also gave her a severe beating, but she took it all in the line of duty. She soon grew to dislike Claudette and gladly transferred out of the Barn with the rest of her team when Waylon requested the end of their co-operation.

=== Ben Gilroy ===
- Portrayed by John Diehl
- Appears in "Our Gang", "Dawg Days", "Pay in Pain", "Cupid & Psycho", "Two Days of Blood", "Circles", "Co-Pilot", "Coyotes" and "Grave"

Assistant Chief Ben Gilroy was a friend and supporter of Vic Mackey. Gilroy often used his power to get Vic out of small jams and helped ensure his position as leader of the Strike Team. The Strike Team was a hard sell to the Chief though, and demanded quick results to allow its existence. This pressure was responsible for Vic and the team taking shortcuts and performing illegal acts to get the job done, which set the path for the Strike Team's corruption. Gilroy protected Vic and his team from new captain, David Aceveda, who disliked Vic from the very beginning. He also informed Vic that Aceveda's addition to the Strike Team, Detective Terry Crowley, was looking to implicate the team in illegal activities, though he didn't expect it to result in Terry's death, for which he became furious with Vic. When Shane Vendrell's Navigator, containing stolen drugs, was stolen, Gilroy told Mackey to let Shane take the fall, since Gilroy couldn't protect the whole team. When Julien Lowe reported the drug theft and Aceveda attempted to bring the team down, Gilroy told Mackey that he didn't have his back anymore. However, Gilroy soon needed Vic's help when he was found to be using his political influence to facilitate an illegal real estate scam, as well as running over a Hispanic gang member and murdering the only witness who could link him to the hit and run. Stripped of his power and facing indictment, pressure and alcoholism led Gilroy to become mentally unstable. When it appeared that Gilroy would offer to testify against the Strike Team in exchange for a reduced sentence, Vic arranged both a new identity for him in Mexico and a hit man in California who would kill him if he ever returned. Gilroy eventually died in Mexico, homeless and destitute, suffering cirrhosis of the liver. He asphyxiated on his own vomit. Vic, Lem and Ronnie attended his funeral but Shane did not.

=== Wayne "Scooby" Haimes ===
- Portrayed by Robert Wu
- Appears in "The Cure", "Grave", "Insurgents", "String Theory" and "Back in the Hole"

Officer Wayne "Scooby" Haimes was first introduced at the scene of a siege where he shot an attacking dog, earning a visit from an angry Assistant Chief Roy Phillips. Vic Mackey helped defuse the situation by saying 'He was reaching...' when the Chief looked at the dog, there was a handgun laying next to its lifeless body. Scooby and his partner Carl Miller were killed by Nigerian thugs organized by Antwon Mitchell's half-brother, Jason Porter.

=== Tina Hanlon ===
- Portrayed by Paula Garcés
- Appears in "Extraction", "Enemy of Good", "Jailbait", "Tapa Boca", "Trophy", "Rap Payback", "Man Inside", "Kavanaugh", "Smoked", "Of Mice and Lem", "Postpartum", "On the Jones", "Chasing Ghosts", "Exiled", "The Math of the Wrath", "Recoil", "Spanish Practices", "Coefficient of Drag", "Snitch", "Money Shot", "Animal Control", "Bitches Brew", "Parricide", "Moving Day", "Party Line", "Petty Cash", "Possible Kill Screen" and "Family Meeting"

Tina arrived at The Barn as a young, attractive, female police officer, and Julien's trainee. She is Spanish and speaks it fluently, and as such is sometimes utilized as an interpreter, but her inability to take her job seriously lead to her making countless mistakes in the field. She posed as a prostitute in order to help the Strike Team take down a sex slavery ring, trying to prove that she can hold her own, but later, back on patrol, she failed to identify an undercover officer and allows the real criminal to escape. She was about to be fired, with both Julien and Danny supporting the move, when photos of her undressing in the locker room begin circulating the barn. Dutch discovers that Billings was responsible for installing the camera, in an effort to catch thieves who were vandalizing the vending machines, so one of Billings' last acts as captain is to offer Tina a deal to remain on the force, overlooking her mistakes to prevent any charges against him. She will remain a patrol officer, but will also work with Dutch for further training. This was done to ensure Dutch's cooperation with Billings in regards to revealing Billing's double dealing as captain and vending machine owner. Dutch had feelings for her and wanted to establish a relationship-an impossible feat were she to be fired. Billing's corruption and incompetence along with Dutch's character testimony would serve as a lifeline for Tina's career. Very early in Season 6, Tina catches on to Dutch's attraction to her and transfers out of Farmington, to take a promotion of sorts with the Department's new public relations campaign. She returned 3 weeks later, with a rather inflated ego, telling Sergeant Dani Sofer that she had met high-ranking people in the Department, and was "not impressed with Sergeant's stripes". Tina also turned her attractive eye on Strike Team Leader Kevin Hiatt, much to Dutch's dismay. In the Season 6 episode "Recoil", Tina had sex with Hiatt after both she and Hiatt were encouraged by Billings to pursue each other. This was orchestrated by Billings as a mental attack on Dutch to make him jealous. However, when news spread of the incident, as well as Hiatt's avoidance of her, Tina deeply regretted sleeping with Hiatt, viewing it as "a big mistake." She also admitted to Danny that Dutch indeed stood a chance with her, but he never took it. She later apologized to Dutch for hurting him. In the series finale, Julien congratulates her on a year of service and throws her a small party in the Barn. However, before they can eat the cake, a siren rings and the officers rush out.

=== Tommy Hisk ===
- Portrayed by Matt Gerald
- Appears in "Playing Tight", "Blood and Water", "Bottom Bitch", "Streaks and Tips", "Mum" "Posse Up", and "Cracking Ice"

Hisk was Julien's partner introduced in season three. The two worked well together until Julien was sent back to work with Danny since the quality of his police work seemed to be affected by his beating at the end of season two. Later on Hisk's ex-wife and son were killed in a robbery. When it was discovered that the murderer was a drug addict Hisk had hired to steal a collection of coins from the house a week earlier Hisk was fired. Hisk later resurfaced to try to get his job back with no success. He committed suicide in the station parking lot.

=== Kevin Hiatt ===
- Portrayed by Alex O'Loughlin.

==== Background ====
Hiatt was originally an INS agent who spent four years on the Mexican border before joining the LAPD, where he was regarded as a rising star within the force. Upon the recommendation of David Aceveda, Hiatt was brought into "The Barn" by Captain Wyms to not only replace the loss of Curtis Lemansky, but to also be the replacement for Detective Vic Mackey, who was being forced out of the department upon his 15th year of duty. He was also giving Captain Wyms information as to what was really going on within the Strike Team, since they've resisted almost all attempts to allow an outsider into the group.

==== Arrival at the Barn ====
Hiatt met the Strike Team during a raid on a hostage situation. He was introduced, then told to stay behind while the team entered the building. Not content to sit on the sidelines, Hiatt quickly donned a bulletproof vest, took a shotgun, and assisted the team in securing the shooter. Hiatt was taken to the Barn, where he was filled in on the situation by Mackey, as well as being warned that he was not ready for Farmington's worst citizens.

Hiatt was then met by Wyms, who asked what he knew of Vic Mackey. He replied that despite Mackey's numerous arrests and results, he has had two members of his team "end up dead" and one member not return to active duty. Hiatt was advised to keep his distance from Vic and that soon enough, the Strike Team would be his.

==== As a team member ====
Hiatt accompanied Vic through a situation in which several former soldiers of the One Niners were attempting to break loose from the gang, resulting their deaths for their disloyalty. Hiatt got to know the other members of the team back in the Strike Team's clubhouse, but also drew the ire of Shane Vendrell, who viewed Hiatt as an interloper and chastised the other team members for forgetting about deceased team member, Curtis "Lem" Lemansky. Shane was particularly angered when, during a critical incident, Hiatt offered to assist, but used Lem's shotgun to take out a suspect.

After his initial observations, Hiatt advised Wyms that from what he observed, Vic may not have been as dirty as the department made him out to be, but rather a victim of his methods, as seen by his apparent playing of several sides in order to get results. Wyms advised Hiatt to again watch himself and wait for the opportunity to witness Mackey's bad side, which he did when Mackey destroyed a hospital waiting room in anguish over the death of the leader of the rebel One Niner soldiers.

Hiatt also stated a desire to hire his own team members to expand the Strike Team, and was promptly given the dossier of officer Julien Lowe. As time passed, Hiatt began to lean on Vic's experience with Farmington and the gangs in the area. Hiatt even disclosed to Mackey the fact that his hearing was rigged in order to have him pushed out of the force, which caused Vic to confront Claudette over this knowledge.

==== Relationship with Tina Hanlon ====
Hiatt drew the attention of Tina Hanlon, who was taken with the young officer and sought to gain his attention with her police work and personal life. Hiatt flirted back in return, but did not pursue Hanlon until Steve Billings informed him that Holland "Dutch" Wagenbach was also interested in Hanlon. Hanlon and Hiatt shared a one-night stand, ruining Hanlon's potential for a more serious romance with Dutch; this situation is manipulated by Billings. Hiatt did not disclose his sexual relationship with Hanlon, a junior officer, to his superiors.

==== Final days ====
It became apparent that Hiatt was in over his head as far as what goes on in Farmington. Several mistakes and actions caused Claudette to doubt Hiatt and warnings from Shane about Vic possibly attempting to seize control of the Strike Team again if his hearing turned out in his favor created an uncomfortable situation that Hiatt attempted to work through. However, several blunders by Hiatt, including the arrest of one of Vic's valuable informants, as well as his one-night stand with Tina Hanlon, resulted in Hiatt being reassigned to another department.

=== Paul Jackson ===
- Portrayed by Frank Grillo
- Appears in "Our Gang", "Dragonchasers", "Breakpoint" and "Dominoes Falling"

Carlson's partner and fellow tormentor of Julien Lowe. He was fired with Carlson and also took part in the beatdown of Julien.

=== Chief Johnson ===
- Portrayed by John Cygan
- Appears in "Of Mice and Lem" and "Postpartum"

Johnson was the chief of police for the LAPD and succeeded Chief Bankston. He only physically appeared in two episodes but was heavily involved in the affairs of the Barn. Roy Phillips was his second and was the eyes, ears and voice of Johnson in the street and the Barn. Johnson was responsible for promoting Claudette Wyms to the rank of captain, and he ended but eventually extended Lieutenant Jon Kavanaugh's internal affairs investigation. He effectively decided the Strike Team's disbandment from his desk in the final season, sealing Vic and Ronnie's ultimate fates and Julien Lowe back to regular police work.

=== Jon Kavanaugh ===
- Portrayed by Forest Whitaker
- Appears in "Extraction", "Enemy of Good", "Jailbait", "Tapa Boca", "Trophy", "Rap Payback", "Man Inside", "Kavanaugh", "Smoked", "Of Mice and Lem", "Postpartum", "On the Jones", "Baptism by Fire" and "Back to One"

Internal Affairs Lieutenant in charge of the corruption case against the Strike Team. Later sentenced to jail for falsifying evidence against Vic Mackey.

=== Carl Miller ===
- Portrayed by Jarvis George
- Appears in "Bang", "Doghouse" and "String Theory"

Patrol Officer Carl Miller and his partner "Scooby" Haines were kidnapped and stabbed to death by Nigerian drug dealers acting on the orders of the Russian arms dealer on whom they issued a parking ticket. Farmington drug lord Antwon Mitchell and his half-brother, Jason Porter hired the Nigerians at the Russian's request. The two policemen's bodies were dumped in an abandoned house as a deliberate attack on Captain Monica Rawling's asset forfeiture policy. Captain Rawling's obsession with seeing Antwon prosecuted for his part in the murders led her to deliberately sabotage his immunity deal with the DEA, thereby leading Chief Johnson to fire her from the Department.

=== Olivia Murray ===
- Portrayed by Laurie Holden
- Appears in "Coefficient of Drag", "Snitch", "Money Shot", "Genocide", "Game Face", "Animal Control", "Bitches Brew", "Parricide", "Moving Day", "Party Line", "Petty Cash", "Possible Kill Screen" and "Family Meeting"

Murray is a federal agent with U.S. Immigration and Customs Enforcement. After I.C.E. could not make progress with the investigation of the San Marcos murders, Murray's investigation was shut down. A body dragging murder gives her a new angle back into the Mexican cartel investigation and the Los Angeles scene. The dragging also launches a working relationship between her and Vic Mackey, who then repeatedly helps her make cases. When her file shows up in Cruz Pezuela's blackmail box, Mackey works to help retrieve it. She is instrumental in Mackey's relationship with I.C.E. and the key to his efforts to cut a deal granting himself full immunity. After Vic's shocking confession after signing the immunity papers, Olivia was filled with rage and disgust of a man who has up till then been playing her for a fool. While Mackey and Gardocki successfully infiltrate Beltran's drug location, Olivia and ICE agents arrive at the scene, as well as Aceveda. While during the bust the drugs are not at first visible, they are found hidden moments later, completing Mackey's immunity deal. Claudette requests that Olivia place Corrine and Mackey's kids into the witness protection program. With this, Olivia could deliver a personal blow to Vic, for tricking her into giving him the immunity deal. At the end of the finale, Olivia knows who the true Vic Mackey is and sees to it that for his next three years, he would work in a purgatory-like office job, knowing very well he'd always be suffering.

=== Roy Phillips ===
- Portrayed by Nigel Gibbs
- Appears in Playing Tight", "Slipknot", "The Cure", "Hurt", "A Thousand Deaths", "Ain't That a Shame", "Extraction", "Of Mice and Lem", "On the Jones", "Exiled" "Snitch" and "Moving Day

Phillips replaced Ben Gilroy as the Assistant Chief of Police. He's apparently an acquaintance of Vic Mackey's, though their relationship has never been clarified—in a private conversation, Mackey said they "have years" together. He appears to be honest, and prefers to wear a full uniform (as opposed to Gilroy's suits). "The Cure" revealed that he is a dog lover who sent a missive ordering them not to be shot. This led an officer into trouble when he shot a dog that was biting his leg. He has often been the bearer of bad news, such as Monica Rawling's termination and Vic forced retirement.

=== Armando "Army" Renta ===
- Portrayed by Michael Peña
- Appears in "Grave", "Bang", "Doghouse", "Tar Baby", "Insurgents", "Hurt", "Cut Throat", "String Theory", "Back in the Hole" and "A Thousand Deaths"

A former soldier returned from Iraq, Army became Shane's partner when Shane left the Strike Team at the end of Season Three. Army allowed himself to be drawn into an alliance between Shane and drug kingpin Antwon Mitchell. Eventually, both Army and Shane were framed by Mitchell for the murder of a 14-year-old girl. Vic helped Army and Shane get out of trouble, although Army refused to take a lie detector test that would exonerate the two. While Shane and Captain Rawling were livid at Army's refusal to take the test, Vic and Lem both separately told Army that they agreed with his decision and allowed Army to walk away from the Strike Team. Army was never officially on the Strike Team—he worked in Vic's anti-gang unit to head up the seizure policy.

== Criminals ==
=== Guillermo Beltran ===
- Portrayed by Francesco Quinn
- Appears in "Moving Day", "Party Line", "Petty Cash", "Possible Kill Screen" and "Family Meeting"

Cruz Pezuela's higher associate in the Mexican cartel who arrives in Farmington in Season 7 to evaluate Pezuela's progress. ICE has high interest in capturing Beltran along with his cartel. Vic plans to bust Beltran and serve him up to ICE in order to strike a deal to obtain full immunity on his past crimes, including the execution-style slayings of Terry Crowley, Margos Dezerian, Guardo Lima, and many others.

=== Margos Dezerian ===
- Portrayed by Kurt Sutter
- Appears in "Blowback", "All In", and "On Tilt"

Margos Dezerian was a powerful and high-ranking hit man for the Armenian Might. He amputated his victims' feet to satisfy a foot fetish. Margos was first seen with several of his gangster associates during a drug deal. He killed one of the associates just as the Strike Team broke in. He was brought to The Barn for questioning but refused to say a word. Instead, he broke another prisoner's neck and later escaped by jumping out of a moving prison van. After the Strike Team stole millions of dollars from the Armenian Might's "money train" (money laundering operation), Margos' bosses ordered him to find and murder the people responsible. Margos then left a trail of grisly murders, first two Armenian mobsters, then Byz Lats leader Diagur Leyva, and finally Neil O'Brien (who found and was under police surveillance for depositing marked money from the money train), all of whose feet he amputated. Margos also kidnapped Sosi, a young Armenian girl, as leverage to force her older sister to handle the gang's bookkeeping. When he observed the Strike Team narrowing in on him, he stabbed her in the back of the neck and left her for the Team to find. Vic and Lem rushed the girl to the emergency room and left Ronnie and Shane to hunt for Margos, but Margos escaped.

Ultimately, Mackey spreads a false rumor that an Armenian Might lieutenant [named Goma] had given the police information that led to a bust, to lure Margos to Goma's home. When Margos went to Goma's house to kill him, Vic ambushed him at gunpoint. After Margos dropped his gun and surrendered, Vic shot him dead and rigged the crime scene evidence to look like self defense. This was the second person in the series whom Vic murdered in cold blood.

=== Alex Eznik ===
- Portrayed by Shaun Duke
- Appears in "Carte Blanche"

Alex is an Armenian mob boss who owns his own dance bar. He wants an associate, Hrach, to be executed for killing one of his hitmen. Vic promises to kill Hrach, but takes an already dead victim and blows his face away with a shotgun in order to deem him unrecognizable. Once Alex agrees furthermore to go along with Vic's plans, Vic takes down the entire Armenian mob operation in that region. After Vic takes down Eznik and the rest of that Armenian operation down, they discover the money train.

=== Santi Galas ===
- Portrayed by Benny Hernandez
- Appears in "Baptism by Fire", "Exiled", "Recoil", "Petty Cash", and "Family Meeting"

Leader of the Byz Lats in Season 6. He maintains a firm relationship with Vic, although he was pressed for information about Lem's killer and was thrown out of Vic's car in the beginning of Season 6.

=== Kleavon Gardner ===
- Portrayed by Ray Campbell
- Appears in "Insurgents", "Back in the Hole" "Rap Payback", "Man Inside" and "Game Face"

A suspected serial killer, Gardner is adept at concealing any evidence of his alleged crimes. He proves to be a difficult case for Dutch and Claudette, seeing through their false claims of evidence and witness testimony. However, Kleavon's previously protective sister finally begins to believe she may be living with a murderer and agrees to cooperate with the police. She disappears, and the detectives tell him they are adding her murder to his charges. While trying to prove he is innocent of his sister's murder, Kleavon confesses to the other murders. As he is being led away, he finds that his sister is alive and has been aiding the police. Kleavon returned for the final season of The Shield and, acting as his own defense, attempted to discredit Claudette's investigation. He focused on the fact that Claudette was on medication and that she had no other suspects in her and Dutch's investigation. He was able to successfully get his death sentence removed, much to Claudette's dismay, but will spend the rest of his life in prison. In his final scene, Dutch asks him to sit and watch live feed of Lloyd Denton's interrogation, the young man who Dutch suspects of murdering a classmate. Kleavon agrees with Dutch that Lloyd could very well be a psychopath: "This kid's got the look, I've seen it before." When asked where, Kleavon coldly states "When I look into the mirror."

=== Hagop ===
- Portrayed by David Caprita
- Appears in "Carte Blanche"

Hagop is one of Alex Eznik's top associates in the Armenian mob. Hagop follows Vic around while Shane Vendrell is left as insurance in the custody of Alex. Hagop gives Vic some addresses to check out in order for their operations after believing that Hrach was taken out by Vic. However, when Hagop sees Hrach at the station, he is attacked by Vic so that no message is sent to Alex involving Hrach still being alive. Vic manages to take down the entire organization under Alex and pull Vendrell out safely.

=== Hrach ===
- Portrayed by Aron Kader
- Appears in "Carte Blanche"

Hrach was an associate for Alex Eznik's Armenian mob until things went sour and he gunned down another associate. Once Alex decided to have him taken out, Hrach gave himself up to the Strike Team. Vic sets up Alex by assuming the role of a bad cop, which wasn't too hard for him to begin with, and shows the body of an already dead victim to Alex. Alex falls for this, thinking that its Hrach, and this leads to his eventual capture, along with all his men. Although Hrach gave up some details, his most important piece of information was about the Money Train operation. The first actual time that the Money Train operation is mentioned to the Strike Team is by Hrach. After finding out that this operation truly exists, Vic and his team try to pull off the heist themselves, resulting in furthermore problematic situations in upcoming seasons.

=== Diro Kesakhian ===
- Portrayed by Franka Potente
- Appears in "The Math of the Wrath", "Recoil" and "Spanish Practices"

A young college girl and devout Orthodox Christian, turned boss of an Armenian Mafia Family. Went by the alias Garine Essagian. After Shane was booted from the Strike Team by Vic, he took to moonlighting as an enforcer for Diro and her dying father. After Shane uncovered the names of three African-Americans who were robbing the Kesakhians' stable of Russian hookers, Diro arranged for the trio to be abducted and castrated. Vic, however, attempted to drive a wedge between Diro and Shane by revealing his stormy past with Antwon Mitchell. Panicking when Diro attempted to end their arrangement, Shane told her that Vic and Ronnie robbed the Money Train. To his horror, Diro responded by putting out contracts on Vic, Ronnie, and their families. When Shane pleaded with her to leave the families out of it, Diro coldly responded, "We can't separate the ones we love from the choices we make." Shane responded by transferring his allegiance to Ellis Rezian, her main rival. Together they forced Diro to flee to Germany, where she had been attending college, but not before euthanising her father. Before catching her flight, she told Shane, "Your sentimentality will destroy you."

=== Diagur Leyva ===
- Portrayed by Frankie Rodriguez
- Appears in "Playing Tight", "Blood and Water", "Mum", "What Power Is..." and "Fire in the Hole"

Former leader of the Byz Lats gang. Replaced former leader Garza when the Strike Team took him down. Allied with Vic, but was murdered (his feet chopped off) by the Armenian Might, most likely Margos Dezerian, when they connected him, through Vic, to the Money Train Robbery.

=== Guardo Lima ===
- Portrayed by Luis Antonio Ramos
- Appears in "Kavanaugh" and "Back to One"

A Salvadoran drug lord falsely believed by Vic to be responsible for Lemansky's murder. After a kidnapper (in actuality Vic), kidnapped his girlfriend, Guardo came out of hiding and attempted to find the kidnapper. However, no one arrived to take the ransom and Guardo was instead captured by Vic, who followed him to his safe house. Guardo was taken to a secluded area, where, after giving Vic a false lead, he was beaten bloody with chains, and shot in the head by Vic as "retribution" for Lem's death. His body was later burned in order to keep his fate a mystery. Guardo was later revealed to have ordered the grisly murder of 11 Mexicans at the San Marcos apartments.

=== Kern Little ===
- Portrayed by Sticky Fingaz
- Appears in "Dawg Days", "Carnivores", "Inferno", "Playing Tight", "Blood and Water" and "Of Mice and Lem"

Former leader of the One-Niners gang and a rapper. Was assassinated on orders of Antwon Mitchell in a robbery involving the Strike Team, as he posed a threat to Mitchell's leadership of the gang.

Kern Little, an aspiring rapper, was a friend of Detective Vic Mackey's CI (confidential informant) Rondell Robinson. In the Season One episode "Dawg Days", a dispute between Kern and a rival rapper from another gang known as 'T-Bone' is brought to the attention of the Farmington Division after causing a number of fatalities out on the street. After repeated warnings from Mackey and the Strike Team to stop the rivalry before it was in danger of escalating into a full blown gang war, Kern and T-Bone could not stop their dispute. In a dilemma, Mackey and Lem decide to send hoax calls to each rapper, informing each one that the other was unaware of the other's next move. Kern and T-Bone were then instructed by Mackey to meet at a rendezvous point, where it became clear he was leading each one to the other. Mackey and Lem tricked the two rappers into walking into a large storage depot, into which both men were then locked together under the instruction that they would have to settle their differences or finish things once and for all. Mackey opened the door of the storage unit early the next morning, where he was surprised to see Kern emerge looking bemused. As Lem asked Kern what happened to T-Bone, the rapper calmly replied that there was nobody else coming out of that unit, having killed T-Bone during the night. Kern offered to have his associates clean up the mess but Lem volunteered instead.

Kern would work with the Strike Team several times over the next few years. He eventually was killed while Mackey helped Antwon Mitchell's associates break into a police warehouse in exchange for Mitchell's mercy on Lem during his prison stay. Antwon hadn't told Vic that Kern was a threat to his power in the gang, and so Kern was shot dead by the other man Antwon had sent with Vic, much to Vic's shock. A guard was killed as well and Mackey covered up both incidents, though he was very distressed.

=== Juan Lozano ===
- Portrayed by Kurt Caceres
- Appears in "Slipknot", "Mum", "Posse Up", "Safe", "What Power Is...", "Grave", "Doghouse", "Back in the Hole", "Judas Priest" and "Ain't That a Shame"

Juan was a low-level member of the Byz Lats. Vic and the Strike Team sought information about the Byz-Lats who used parts of their stolen money train cash, and to get information, Vic assaulted Juan violently, forcing him to choke on a bong he was smoking. Juan and his accomplice would later be assigned to take the remaining money the Strike Team were after to another location, but not before encountering Aceveda, who stayed alone at the stash house to investigate. Juan proceeded to attack and orally rape Aceveda while his accomplice took a photo of the rape. Aceveda eventually recovered and researched Juan and his crew, eventually tailing them and killing his accomplice and recovering the phone which the photo was taken. Still worried about future embarrassment and humiliation this incident would bring him, as Lozano was threatening to speak publicly of the incident, Aceveda made a DEA immunity deal with Antwon Mitchell in return for Antwon murdering Lozano. Lozano was then murdered by Antwon with a 40-pound weight from a barbell. Unfortunately for Aceveda, Juan made a digital copy of the photo on a USB before his death.

=== Goma Magar ===
- Portrayed by Michael Benyaer
- Appears in "On Tilt"

Goma is one of Margos Dezerian's contacts. He has connections with the Armenian Might. However, once Vic pinpoints him as a traitor to Margos, he fears for his life, as the entire Armenian mob might try to kill him for trying to help Vic. Vic uses this as a method of setting up Margos, who goes to Goma's house to execute him. Vic takes this opportunity to kill Margos.

=== Antwon Mitchell ===
- Portrayed by Anthony Anderson
- Appears in "The Cure", "Grave", "Bang", "Doghouse", "Tar Baby", "Insurgents", "Hurt", "Cut Throat", "String Theory", "Back in the Hole", "Judas Priest", "Ain't That a Shame", "Kavanaugh", "Of Mice and Lem", "Postpartum" and "Chasing Ghosts"

A drug kingpin who, having been released from a lengthy prison sentence, tried to reinvent himself as an upstanding black community leader out to aid the black citizens of Farmington, while secretly flooding those same citizens with black tar heroin. He is currently imprisoned for personally gunning down a 14-year-old police informant, ordering the kidnapping and stabbing deaths of two cops from The Barn, and trying to blackmail Detective Shane Vendrell into murdering Detective Vic Mackey.

=== Moses ===
- Portrayed by L. Michael Burt
- Appears in "Of Mice and Lem", "On the Jones", "The New Guy", "Haunts" and "Snitch"

Leader of the One-Niners on the street in season 6. Very loudspoken and cocky. Moses and Shane had an antagonistic rapport with each other over the teenage girl they were both sleeping with.

=== Tomas Motyashik ===
- Portrayed by Brent Roam
- Appears in "The Spread", "Blowback", "Pay in Pain", "Cupid & Psycho", "Carnivores", "Inferno" and "Breakpoint"

Was briefly Julien's lover and small-time crook. Was arrested by Vic while he and Julien were having an affair in Tomas' apartment. This arrest and sexual encounter is what Vic used to blackmail Julien into getting the drug charges dropped on the strike team. He disappeared into the penal system after season 2 after assaulting Julien's Sexual Reorientation sponsor, following his public outing of Julien.

=== Theodore "T.O." Osmond ===
- Portrayed by Cedric Pendleton
- Appears in "Carnivores", "Circles", "The Quick Fix" and "Dead Soldiers"

T.O. took the place of Rondell Robinson as the Strike Team's way to control the drugs in Farmington, using his comic book store as a front for his operations. His store was burnt down by Armadillo Quintero, but his safe recovered intact by Claudette Wyms during the investigation. The safe contained evidence pointing to a suspected illegal arrangement with Vic Mackey, though T.O. denied any connection when questioned. He was later murdered by Armadillo Quintero, which infuriated Mackey, leading him to beat and torture Armadillo.

=== Cruz Pezuela ===
- Portrayed by F. J. Rio
- Appears in "The New Guy", "Haunts", "Exiled", "The Math of the Wrath", "Recoil", "Spanish Practices", "Coefficient of Drag", "Snitch", "Genocide", "Animal Control", "Moving Day" and "Party Line"

A Mexican real estate developer and diplomat, Pezuela has a great deal of land and construction interests in the Farmington area and is backed by several wealthy investors in Mexico, many of whom hold positions of power in the Mexican Government. Pezuela seeks out David Aceveda, seeking to use him to not only get the feel of the Farmington area, but also to allow him access into the local government and police. It is at Pezuela's behest that Aceveda begins to push for the San Marcos murders to be solved, especially when Pezuela offers to make a generous donation to fund Aceveda's mayoral campaign. As time passes and Pezuela not only begins to appear at the Barn, but also to offer information and leads into the killings, Vic Mackey's curiosity is aroused and he begins to investigate Pezuela's possible involvement in the San Marcos killings. Pezuela realizes the threat Vic poses and attempts to convince Aceveda into testifying on Mackey's behalf in order to keep him employed. When Aceveda declines, Pezuela instead offers Vic another form of compensation to get the detective off of his back: the camera phone picture of Aceveda performing oral sex on a gang-member. Pezuela reveals his secret contempt of Aceveda, telling him that the Councilman "instead of standing up to his attacker like a man, he got on his knees and took another man's dick in his mouth." He gives the picture to Vic to use at his disposal, but advises him to "stop digging." Vic, however, used the picture to build an alliance with Aceveda in an attempt to prevent his own forced retirement. After revealing Pezuela's close ties to the Mexican drug cartels, Vic stole a car containing Pezuela's blackmail material on high-ranking City officials, thereby scuttling the Cartels' attempt to take over the neighborhood and saving his own job. Later in the series, Drug lord Guillermo Beltran grooms Vic for a position in the Cartel in return that Vic kills Pezuela. But in Vic's feigned attempt to do so, Vic revealed to Pezuela he was working undercover for ICE, namely agent Olivia Murray. Briefly after this, Pezuela was given full immunity and witness protection by Agent Murray in cooperation that he gives information on the Cartel. The official news was that Cruz Pezuela committed suicide, in which Vic gave this information to Beltran to get deeper in the Cartel.

=== Armadillo Quintero ===
- Portrayed by Daniel Pino
- Appears in "The Quick Fix", "Dead Soldiers", "Partners", "Greenlit" and "Scar Tissue"

Armadillo was a young, psychopathic drug trafficker who arrived from Mexico hoping to take over Farmington's drug trade. As a child, he was given an IQ test and scored well above the genius level. His criminal record revealed his first crime was the rape of his primary school teacher at the age of 11. Armadillo was known for necklacing his rivals. He was also responsible for the rape of a 12-year-old girl who had offered to testify against him. He would mark his rape victims with a tattoo of a dove on their face, with both the girlfriend of a rival gang member and the 12-year-old girl among the victims of this cruel practice. Although previously mortal enemies, the Farmington street gangs Los Mags and The Toros agreed to unite under Armadillo's violent and ruthless rule.

After Armadillo's crew murdered his drug dealing ally T.O., Vic Mackey became enraged and attempted to intimidate Armadillo into returning to Mexico. When Armadillo refused, Vic, Lem and Shane stormed his home while Ronnie covered the front. Vic then proceeded to brutally beat him with a heavy law book. Eventually, Vic's rage at Armadillo's defiance spurred him to burn Armadillo's face on the kitchen stove in his house. Vic eventually ceased his brutality and left him to leave, but Armadillo, seething with hatred, proceeded to put out contracts on all members of the Strike Team in revenge. Several of his men shadowed the four team members for weeks, with Ronnie being the first to notice and express concern, despite being the only member not present during Armadillo's burning. Unfortunately, Armadillo used this fact to his advantage and had Gardocki's face similarly disfigured as payback when Ronnie went to Vic's apartment to pick up some items.

Armadillo arranged to turn himself over to the police willingly after he realized the Strike Team intended to murder him in retaliation. During his interrogation, Armadillo threatened to ruin Vic's career by revealing to the other detectives that it was Vic who disfigured him unless Vic made Ronnie recant on his statement. Although Vic was willing to admit to the attack to protect Ronnie, Shane and Lem disagreed and secretly convinced one of Armadillo's disgruntled underlings to get himself arrested. Longing to return to the prison he once ruled, the gangster approached Officers Danny Sofer and Julien Lowe and blew marijuana in their faces. After the two officers put him in the same holding cage as his boss, Shane and Lem slipped him a shiv and watched as he stabbed Armadillo to death.

=== Ellis Rezian ===
- Portrayed by Ludwig Manukian
- Appears in "Exiled", "Recoil", "Spanish Practices", "Coefficient of Drag", "Snitch", "Money Shot", "Genocide" and "Animal Control"

A leading figure of the Armenian Mafia. He is set up and arrested by Shane Vendrell. Even from prison, however, he is determined not to allow Diro Kesakhian to become the boss of the Armenian mob. Therefore, he teams with Shane near the end of the sixth season in order to stop Kesakhian from unleashing retribution on Mackey's family. In the aftermath, however, he vowed to hold the Money Train Heist over Shane's head. Rezian said that if Shane didn't do what he was told or if the Armenians received any problems from the police, he would murder Vic, Ronnie, and their families. He coldly added that he would save Shane, Mara, and their children for last.

In the seventh season, Rezian is released from prison, and falls into a trap set up between Vic Mackey and Shane Vendrell, where he is dragged into believing that the Mexicans are after him, led by Pezuela. However, this threat was fictitious and created by Vic himself. As Vic played Rezian and Pezuela against each other, making Pezuela believe that Rezian held the contents of the "box," which supposedly held information on Pezuela, and making Rezian believe that the Mexicans were targeting his gang. In a last-ditch effort to remove Rezian, Mackey sets up a trap, which Shane barely slips out of. Rezian is set up to be murdered by Vic Mackey by two of Pezuela's thugs. Shane barely manages to get out of the crossfire as Rezian is ruthlessly gunned down along with some of his lieutenants. Afterwards, although realizing that the threat of the Armenian mob has been neutralized, Shane also understands that Vic and Ronnie set him up to be murdered along with Rezian as payback for the slaying of Lem.

=== Rondell Robinson ===
- Portrayed by Walter Jones
- Appears in "Dawg Days", "Carnivores" and "Co-Pilot"

A major drug dealer in the Farmington neighborhood with links to the Farmington One-Niners. Rondell was Vic's major supplier of drugs and was used by the Strike Team in order for them to keep track of what was put on the street. However, Rondell's impulsiveness and drug addiction make him increasingly unreliable, especially as he escalates conflicts with both rival dealers and the Nation of Islam. Vic eventually has Rondell murdered and replaced by T.O.

=== Kail Saffian ===
- Portrayed by Vahe Bejan
- Appears in "All in"

Kail Saffian is a high-ranking member of the Armenian mob. He is rather overweight. Meanwhile, Vic needs to take out Margos Dezerian before he takes out the entire Strike Team. Saffian is caught in a parking lot along with many associates, with a ton of drugs being carried in Middle Eastern carpets. Vic tries to interrogate Saffian on the whereabouts of Margos by shoving his face in a container of waste oil. Once Saffian struggles to breathe, Vic realizes that the Strike Team is being watched by Dezerian from afar in a high level building. By the time they get to the top, Margos is gone and Sosi, a young girl whom Margos had kidnapped, was stabbed by him.

=== Halpern White ===
- Portrayed by Laurence Mason
- Appears in "Grave", "Bang", "Doghouse", "Tar Baby", "Insurgents", "Hurt", "Cut Throat", "String Theory", "A Thousand Deaths" and "Smoked"

White is the second in command of the One-Niners gang under Antwon Mitchell. He was a go-between for the gang leader and the cops when Shane and Army started their relationship with Mitchell. When he threatened to report their relationship, Shane and Army badly beat him. White would return the beating when Antwon's thugs jumped them and killed Angie with Shane's and Army's guns. Later, when trying to get White to overthrow Antwon, he was accidentally shot in the shoulder by Army and spent some time in the hospital. He recovered and eventually worked as an informant for the Strike Team.

=== Ari Zadofian ===
- Portrayed by Raff Anoushian
- Appears in "Spanish Practices", "Coefficient of Drag"

Zadofian was one of Diro Kesakian's closest enforcers and had previously worked for her father. After Diro learned of the Strike Team's robbery of the Money Train, Zadofian was sent to murder Vic's family. However, the plan went sour when he was ambushed and shot in the stomach by Shane.

In Season Seven, Vic and Ronnie found him hiding in a hotel, tied him to the bed, and squeezed him for information regarding the contract on Vic's family. Once Zadofian confirmed that he was responsible, Ronnie ordered him to place a cell phone call to Diro. Before Zadofian could answer, Ronnie shot him in cold blood. Shane, who was in the vicinity, entered the hotel and found Zadofian's corpse. In order to make it look like an Armenian Mafia slaying, Shane severed Zadofian's feet and left the scene.

== Friends and family ==
=== Aurora Aceveda ===
- Portrayed by Camillia Sanes
- Appears in "Dawg Days", "Cupid & Psycho", "Dragonchasers", "Carnivores", "Coyotes", "Greenlit", "Homewrecker", "Breakpoint" and "Dominoes Falling", "Posse Up", "Slipknot", "What Power Is...", "The Cure", "Back in the Hole" and "Judas Priest"

Aurora is David Aceveda's wife and supporter of his political campaign. She is certain to remain by his side during his campaign, no matter how their personal relationship is at the time. Their relationship hit a rough patch after David was raped but they eventually moved past it. The Acevedas have a young daughter.

=== Joe Clark ===
- Portrayed by Carl Weathers
- Appears in "Partners" and "Haunts"

Joe Clark was Vic's first partner and training officer. It was Clark who taught Vic how to deal with violent street criminals and how to bend the laws to his advantage. Clark was discharged from the police force for becoming too personally involved in a vendetta against a local drug dealer, who'd assaulted Clark's partner; Clark brutally beat the young man to avenge the assault. The drug dealer subsequently sued him for excessive force and won, forcing Clark's retirement without a pension, ruining his marriage, and causing him to lose his family. Clark's legacy to Vic was the justification that they always "did more good than bad". The "Co-Pilot" episode established that Clark's forced retirement occurred in the same year the Barn and the Strike Team were formed.

Clark made his first appearance visiting Vic at the Barn and asking him for assistance against the same drug and weapons dealer who'd ruined his career and who continued to deal drugs and sell weapons while showing off his wealth from the payout of the court case. Despite disagreeing with him, Vic assisted him in taking the criminal down but paid for it by being shot. Clark remained indebted to Vic, and eventually the pair met up again years later, with Clark becoming an enforcer-for-hire who used his intimidation skills from his days as a cop to earn an income. Vic once again assisted Clark and another enforcer (who proved incompetent and sadistic) in a case against Jamaican drug dealers in an apartment complex. Vic participated in the raid, but realized Clark's type of work was both dangerous and unnecessarily cruel. When Vic saw what Clark had become, he left, and Clark wasn't seen again.

=== Becca Doyle ===
- Portrayed by Laura Harring
- Appears in "Jailbait", "Tapa Boca", "Trophy", "Rap Payback", "Man Inside", "Smoked", "Of Mice and Lem" and "Postpartum"

Becca is a defense attorney who convinces Claudette to take a second look at a case Claudette had closed with Dutch. Becca is initially distrustful of Vic after his testimony caused one of her clients to be convicted, but Vic convinces her to help bring down a sex slave ring. Vic later enlists her to help defend the Strike Team from the Internal Affairs investigation, which assignment she accepts under the impression that Aceveda and IAD are seeking scapegoats for their own misdeeds. When it is revealed that the Strike Team is under investigation for murder, Becca confronts Vic, who admits to certain aspects of his wrongdoing, including embezzlement, but insists that he wants to change and have a fresh start. Becca believes him and continues to work for the team. Vic and Becca get involved romantically, but the next day she discovers, through Lemansky, that the Strike Team did indeed rob the Armenian money train, and people were killed because of it. From that point on, she loses her trust in Vic and refuses to help him. She does, however, try to help Lem, but Lem is hellbent on turning himself in.

=== Rita Dressler ===
- Portrayed by Frances Fisher
- Appears in "Possible Kill Screen", "Moving Day", "Game Face", "Genocide"

The mother of a budding teenage serial killer. She is attracted to and befriended by Dutch. Dutch believes that her son, Lloyd, planned a burglary of their own home in order to shoot the would-be burglar.

Rita is initially convinced of her son's innocence but later seems to have doubts. Before she can act on her doubts, she mysteriously disappears and is presumed to have been killed by Lloyd.

=== Sadie Kavanaugh ===
- Portrayed by Gina Torres
- Appears in "Kavanaugh" and "Of Mice and Lem"

Sadie is the mentally-troubled ex-wife of the Internal Affairs Lieutenant who investigates the Strike Team during season 5, Jon Kavanaugh. She and Vic engage in a sexual encounter in retaliation against the Lieutenant.

=== Jorge Machado ===
- Portrayed by Efrain Figueroa
- Appears in "Dawg Days", "Cupid & Psycho", "Carnivores", "The Quick Fix", "Coyotes", "Breakpoint" and "Bottom Bitch"

Jorge Machado, the "Kingmaker" becomes Aceveda's political ally and supports him on his bid for city council. He even looks past some of Aceveda's major blunders and eventually leads him to nomination.

=== Cassidy Mackey ===
- Portrayed by Autumn Chiklis
- Appears in "Cupid & Psycho", "Two Days of Blood", "Partners", "Carte Blanche", "Homewrecker", "Scar Tissue", "Breakpoint", "Playing Tight", "Bottom Bitch", "Streaks and Tips", "Mum", "Safe", "Slipknot", "Fire in the Hole", "On Tilt", "Grave", "Doghouse", "Insurgents", "Cut Throat", "Ain't That a Shame", "Extraction", "Trophy", "Rap Payback", "Smoked", "Postpartum", "On the Jones", "Chasing Ghosts", "Spanish Practices", "Coefficient of Drag", "Snitch", "Money Shot" and "Genocide"

In Season 6, "Chasing Ghosts", Vic's older daughter Cassidy confronted Vic about his unethical past, after hearing some vicious stories about him from the father of one of her friends, who is a defense attorney. Vic lied and denied everything, and Corinne intervened by saying Kavanaugh had tried to set Vic up and gone to jail for doing so. Neither Vic nor Corinne could deny the existence of Lee, however; Cassidy had heard Corrine discussing Vic and Danielle's illegitimate child on the phone and was appalled that Vic would keep the boy a secret. In response, Vic introduced Cassidy to her half-brother, Lee Carson Sofer. Cassidy refused to hold Lee and wanted to leave right away. In an argument wherein Cassidy was supposed to watch Matthew but instead went to an alcohol party, Cassidy physically pushed Corrine, and Vic aggressively grabbed Cassidy and started hollering at her.

=== Matthew Mackey ===
- Portrayed by Joel Rosenthal and Jack Webber
- Appears in "Our Gang", "The Spread", "Dawg Days", "Blowback", "Cupid & Psycho", "Throwaway", "Partners", "Carte Blanche", "Homewrecker", "Barnstormers", "Breakpoint", "Playing Tight", "Mum", "Posse Up", "Safe", "Slipknot", "Strays", "Fire in the Hole", "On Tilt", "Grave", "Extraction", "Enemy of Good", "Jailbait", "Rap Payback" and "Spanish Practices"

Vic's son. He is diagnosed with autism, requiring expensive doctors and therapy.

Note: Joel Rosenthal's final episode was "On Tilt"

=== Megan Mackey ===
- Portrayed by:
- Appears in: "Pilot", "Our Gang"

Vic's youngest daughter. Like her brother Matthew, Megan has autism.

=== Corrine Mackey ===
- Portrayed by Cathy Cahlin Ryan

Vic's estranged wife and mother of his three oldest children. Vic's job, philandering, and other stressful events strain their marriage, eventually causing Corinne and Vic to separate. Corrine then must balance the challenges of being a single mother and an Emergency Room nurse. She had a relationship with Dutch Wagenbach during season 4.

In Season 5, Lieutenant Jon Kavanaugh dragged Corinne into the Internal Affairs investigation against Vic. When Kavanaugh interrogated her she told him about the bag containing $65,000.00 of stolen money Vic had given her. Kavanaugh then asked her to turn over the unspent $5000 of that money as evidence for his investigation. On Vic's suggestion Corrine hired an attorney, but Kavanaugh refused to offer her a deal for cooperating and later froze her assets to prevent Vic from using her for money to bail out Lem. He also told Corrine about Danny Sofer's longtime affair with Vic and Danny's pregnancy. Corrine confronted Danny about the child, angrily calling her a whore and the unborn child is a bastard. Later, after Vic slept with Kavanaugh's ex-wife, Kavanaugh tried to follow suit by seducing Corrine. When she rejected him, Kavanaugh tried to rape her but could not bring himself to go through with it.

In Season 6, after Vic was charged with Lemansky's murder, Corrine stormed into The Barn and angrily confronted Kavanaugh in front of the entire station house. She then filed charges of harassment and attempted sexual assault against him.

Viewing all of Kavanaugh's accusations against Vic as completely groundless, Corrine brought her and Vic's three children to appear on his behalf at a Department Review Board in the Season 6 finale. She assured Vic they would always be there for him.

As the series wound to a close, however, Corrine learned from Mara Vendrell the full extent of Vic's crimes. After briefly agreeing to help him, Corinne learned that Vic was trying to kill Shane and Mara. As a result, she approached Dutch Wagenbach and offered to help him build a criminal case against her ex-husband. After learning of Vic's immunity deal with ICE, a horrified Corrine pleaded with Dutch and Claudette to protect her and her children. Claudette responded by arranging for them to disappear into the Witness Protection Program.

=== Emolia Melendez ===
- Portrayed by Onahoua Rodriguez
- Appears in "Back in the Hole", "A Thousand Deaths", "Ain't That a Shame", "Extraction", "Enemy of Good", "Tapa Boca", "Trophy", "Kavanaugh", "Postpartum", "On the Jones", "Baptism by Fire" and "Back to One"

Emolia is a single mother, with a special needs son named Sebastio, and a longtime informant for Vic Mackey. Emolia witnessed Curtis Lemansky steal a kilo of heroin. Captain Monica Rawling (Glenn Close) had originally ordered an IAD investigation into Vic to prove he was clean, and in the last episode of season 4, she visits her IAD assistant, with Emolia in attendance. Emolia reveals Lem took the heroin, and makes a comment revealing she has no real loyalty to any officer, just whoever has the money (this meeting leads to Lieutenant Jon Kavanaugh, the assistant's boss, into his season 5 investigation into the Strike Team.)

She remained Vic's informant for six months, giving him information and accepting his favors for her son. Vic became attached to her, expressed a wish for her to leave the informant business, and offered to help her find work elsewhere, but ultimately he discovered she was also serving as an informant for IAD Lieutenant Jon Kavanaugh. Vic managed to get her alone and threatened her to not reveal any more information. Emolia was nearly killed in a Salvadoran grenade manufacturing plant during a sting and later expressed regret to Vic for betraying Lem. When Lemansky accepted a deal, Kavanaugh's investigation disintegrated. In the aftermath, Emolia tried to convince Vic to accept her as an informant once again. Vic, however, would not be persuaded and, after using her services one last time to obtain information about the Salvadoran mob's current operations, he cut all ties to her.

In Season 6, Emolia returned to the lives of the Strike Team when Kavanaugh fed her a false story in exchange for witness protection, hoping to frame Vic for Lemansky's murder. However, Dutch disproved Emolia's story, after discovering that Kavanaugh and Emolia had never met at the place they had described. Although Emolia was about to retract her testimony after a lecture from Claudette and a promise of protection, but a guilt ridden Kavanaugh entered the interrogation room and confessed to feeding Emolia the story and to planting evidence in Vic's apartment. Despite this, Emolia was placed in witness protection.

Later in Season 6, Vic commented to Shane that, although Salvadoran drug lord Guardo Lima was aware that Emolia was "snitching", Guardo chose not to kill her in order to stay off the Strike Team's radar.

=== Connie Reisler ===
- Portrayed by Jamie Anne Allman
- Appears in "Pilot", "The Spread", "Cherrypoppers", "Dragonchasers", "Greenlit", "Homewrecker", "Scar Tissue" and "Co-Pilot"

Connie is a crack-addicted prostitute. Vic was very sympathetic to her because she was a single mother with a baby son. Near the end of season 1, Vic helped Connie go through detox for the sake of her son. Despite the process, Connie relapsed, sneaked out to get high, and disappeared. She later returned to the Barn and left her baby, Brian, with Vic to be put into foster care, answering Vic's plea that Brian needs his mother with him: "That's not me." However, Vic checks on Brian repeatedly to make sure the foster family is treating him appropriately.

In season 2, Connie reappeared at the Barn one day completely clean and wanting to scrape up some money by working as a C.I. for Vic. Vic reluctantly agreed. Later, during a fugitive case that the Strike Team was working on, Connie got involved without Vic's consent. A hostage situation ensued, resulting in her being fatally shot. A horrified Vic, unable to help her, was forced to watch Connie die. After the hostile was neutralized, Vic sat down, disturbed and speechless.

As of season 3, Brian was still in the foster care system, where he seemed happier than ever.

=== Mara Sewell-Vendrell ===
- Portrayed by Michele Hicks
- Appears in "Playing Tight", "Blood and Water", "Bottom Bitch", "Streaks and Tips", "Mum", "Safe", "Cracking Ice", "Slipknot", "What Power Is...", "Strays", "All In", "Bang", "Jailbait", "Haunts", "Exiled", "Coefficient of Drag", "Money Shot", "Animal Control", "Parricide", "Moving Day", "Party Line", "Petty Cash", "Possible Kill Screen", and "Family Meeting"

Mara Sewell was introduced at the opening of season 3, though it was not clear how Shane met her. She is very moody and has a foul temper, often demanding a lot of Shane's attention. She doesn't like Vic and is jealous of his close friendship with Shane. Shane and Mara had a rocky relationship at first, with her becoming furious when he thought things were moving too fast until Mara announced very unceremoniously that she was pregnant. Shane, having old-fashioned Southern standards, immediately wanted to get married. Mara agreed, but became angry for reasons unknown to Shane. He later realized the reason for her ire was because he hadn't got her a ring and set out to get one. The two later married near the end of season three.

Things got interesting when Mara discovered the receipt with "Cletus Van Damme" from the storage locker where the Strike Team was storing their money from the Armenian Money Train robbery. Mara helped herself to about $7,000, some of which was marked by the United States Department of Treasury. During an investigation by Dutch, it was discovered that some of the marked money was spent it Indio, California and that the Feds were on the way to investigate. Upon hearing of Indio, Shane's curiosity was piqued. Later in the evening, Shane was on the phone with Mara's mother, where she revealed that Mara had sent her the missing $7,000. At this point, the Strike Team moved the money to another storage locker, without telling Shane the location, fearing Mara would discover it again. The circumstances of the Armenian Money Train Robbery were not revealed to Mara or her mother; they bought Shane's story of just "skimming it off of drug dealers"

Mara put herself on the line for Shane when Tavon Garris and Shane had a physical altercation in Shane's apartment. Tavon had come over to clear up any bad feelings between him and Shane. Shane then called Tavon a racial slur ("darkie") and the fight broke out. Tavon kneed Shane in the groin, causing Shane to practically paralyze. Mara entered the apartment to see Tavon on top dominating Shane, and she picked up a laundry iron, and smashed him across the back of the head with it. Tavon then left the apartment to drive back to the Barn, however, due to his head injury from the iron, he crashed his vehicle into another, and was in grave condition for the remainder of the season. He would not be seen again until the season 7 episode, Animal Control. This incident with Tavon, in addition to Mara taking the $7,000 from the Money Train, is what began the tension that eventually led to the Strike Team's collapse at the end of Season 3.

Mara played a lesser role through seasons 4 and 5, but she was featured more heavily in season 6. When Mara discovers that Shane was having an affair with a girl who was barely eighteen, she is enraged and throws him out of the house. In an attempt to come back home, Shane confessed to Mara that he, not Guardo, was in fact the one who murdered Curtis Lemansky. Mara, seeing how badly Shane's guilt was tearing him up inside, took him back.

Mara and Shane's love grew to be very strong and she even killed someone while trying to save Shane from two drug addicts that he was in a fight with, injuring herself in the process. When things look bleak, Shane poisons Mara and their young son so that they can "always be a family" and to save her from doing time in prison.

=== Lee Carson Sofer ===
Vic and Danny's illegitimate son, and half-brother of Vic's children with Corrine.

=== Ursula Hayes' nurse ===
- Portrayed by Talmadge Ragan
- Appears in "Inferno"

A nurse who works at Mission Cross Hospital. She is in charged of taking care Ursula Hayes.

== Gangs ==
In season 7 episode 2: "Snitch", the Mayor's office released a list of the top 10 most wanted gangs.

Top 10 Most Wanted Gangs in Farmington
| Rank | Gang | Rank | Gang |
|---|---|---|---|
| #1 | The Local Businessmen | #6 | Unknown |
| #2 | Armenian Mob Syndicate | #7 | Ghost Town Pirus |
| #3 | K-Town Killers | #8 | Unknown |
| #4 | Byz Lats | #9 | Unknown |
| #5 | One-Niners | #10 | Unknown |

=== African-American ===
- Athens: A black gang mentioned in season 7 episode 2: "Snitch" as possibly being responsible for a recent murder.
- Compton Crowns: A Black gang founded in Los Angeles by Dante Fell, among others. Dante left Los Angeles and spent four years opening franchises of his gang in Wichita, San Antonio, and Oklahoma City.
- E-Park Johnnies: A small-time Farmington gang, notorious for their "April Fool's parties", where after tallying up the number of gang members killed the previous year, the remaining members pick dominoes. Whoever draws a domino whose number is double the number of dead members must approach a random individual, say "Johnny says April Fool's", and murder them. Claudette Wyms' ex-husband was murdered in this fashion in the season 2 episode 13: "Dominoes Falling".
- Farmtown 12: A Black gang that was very powerful in Farmington until its neighborhoods were overrun with Latino immigrants.
- Ghost Town Pirus: A Black gang involved in carjackings and sexual assaults in season 7 episode 5: "Game Face". Also mentioned by Moses, leader of the One-Niners in season 7 episode 2: "Snitch". The Ghost Town Pirus were #7 on the "Top 10 Most Wanted Gangs List".
- Nation of Islam: Appearing primarily in season 1 episode 11: "Carnivores", the Nation of Islam had a dispute with Rondell Robinson & the One-Niners.
- One-Niners: The most powerful black gang in Farmington. Notable members include Antwon Mitchell and Kern Little. Their gang color is purple. They also appear to be in the same fictional universe as the television program Sons of Anarchy, which was created by The Shield writer-executive producer Kurt Sutter. Additionally, a member of the One-Niners appears on S.W.A.T.. The One-Niners were #5 on the "Top 10 Most Wanted Gangs List".
- Splash Posse: A Jamaican gang from Miami. Vic offered to broker a deal between them and Antwon in exchange for a little girl's body.
- Spookstreet Souljahs: A Black gang that becomes a target for both the Decoy Squad and the Strike Team in season 3. In season 3 episode 13: "Fire in the Hole", Detective Claudette Wyms partners with the Decoy Squad member Trish George in an undercover sting to arrest a high ranking leader of the gang, who is a pedophile. The gang's color is gray. Spookstreet did not make the "Top 10 Most Wanted Gangs List" as confirmed in season 7 episode 2: "Snitch".

=== Asian-American ===
- K-Town Killers: A Korean gang. The K-Town Killers were #3 on the "Top 10 Most Wanted Gangs List".

=== Hispanic ===
- 25th Street Coronas: A Latino gang active in Farmington. Miguel Esteana was one of its members.
- Aztecs: a Mexican gang.
- Baja Diablo Cartel: A Mexican drug cartel based in Baja California, Mexico. Mentioned once by Vic in season 2 episode 13: "Dominoes Falling".
- Byzantine Latinos (or "Byz Lats"): A Mexican gang. They are the local satellite for the Mexican Cartel. Members of the Byz Lats also appear in an episode ("Binary Explosion") in the third season of The Unit, which shares executive producer Shawn Ryan with The Shield, and there is a Byz Lats set in Stockton, California, featured in Sons of Anarchy.
- Farmtown Mijos: A Mexican gang based in Farmington that is never seen in the series, but is once mentioned by Vic Mackey.
- Los Magnificos (or "Los Mags"): A Mexican gang. The Los Mags were on the "Top 10 Most Wanted Gangs List", although their rank was never specified.
- Los Profetas: A Mexican gang with a strong religious bent; Vic calls them killers with conscience. They keep to their own small piece of street but were suspected of lynching a black mural artist in season 3, just prior to the murder of their religious leader. After it was discovered a member of the One-Niners was behind it all, they got a member in County jail to (presumably) kill him. They seem to be on peaceful terms with Vic.
- El Salvadorans: Involved in drug trafficking, extortion, and murder. Guardo Lima is a known member.
- Los Toros: A Mexican gang.
- Torrucos: A unification of Los Mags and Los Toros formed by Armadillo Quintero. Despite Armadillo's death they stay together, although Los Mags become an entity again.

=== White ===
- Armenian Might: Armenian organized crime syndicate. Members and affiliates include Margos Dezerian, Diro Kesakhian, Goma Magar, Ellis Rezian, Ari Zadofian, and Kail Saffian. Widely feared throughout Farmington due to brutal murder/torture practices carried out by known members, such as foot severing, body mutilation, threats to kill children and wives, and connections (a "mole") to U.S. Treasury Department. The Strike Team stole millions from their money train, setting up most of the events of season 3. In later seasons, the Armenian Might is placed in between a war between the Mexican drug cartels.
- The Horde MC: A national biker gang with a reputation for extreme violence and racial bigotry. One visit to Farmington was a robbery that ended with the culprits arrested by the Strike Team. In season 6, the Horde are mentioned as buying a large shipment of meth. Ronnie goes undercover, and this results in the arrest of three of the Horde bikers.
- Russian Mafia: Frequently referred to as "R.O.C." (Russian Organized Crime). Very powerful and the main conduit for any other gang wanting to work outside Farmington. Usually known to be in friendly cahoots with the Armenian Might.

=== Mixed ===
- Fourth Street Clown Posse: Appeared in the series.
- The Local Businessmen: A mixed race gang of Los Angeles crooked businessmen and mafia members.
- The Tuesday Afternoon Crew: A gang of local sub par strippers who carry out robberies of pharmacies.
