= List of The Shield episodes =

Episodes of American crime drama TV series

The Shield is an American crime drama television created by Shawn Ryan and starring Michael Chiklis. The series premiered on FX on March 12, 2002 and ended on November 25, 2008, totaling 88 episodes over seven seasons, plus one additional mini-episode.

== Series overview ==
Season	Episodes	Originally released	
Season	Episodes	First released	Last released
1	13	March 12, 2002	June 4, 2002
2	13	January 7, 2003	April 1, 2003
3	15	March 9, 2004	June 15, 2004
4	13	March 15, 2005	June 14, 2005
5	11	January 10, 2006	March 21, 2006
6	10	April 3, 2007	June 5, 2007
7	13	September 2, 2008	November 25, 2008

== Episodes ==
=== Season 1 (2002) ===
Captain David Aceveda, seeking to usurp the current black City Council representative of Farmington by swaying the Latino vote, looks to rid his precinct, The Barn, of corruption, starting with Detective Vic Mackey and the controversial yet effective Strike Team that Mackey leads. Aceveda works with the Justice Department to bring Detective Terry Crowley onto the Strike Team to try to gain evidence to use on Vic. However, Vic is aware of Terry's informing due to his friendship with the Assistant Chief of Police, Ben Gilroy.

When the Strike Team conducts a raid on the residence of Two-Time, a drug dealer, Vic and Strike Team member Detective Shane Vendrell are shot at by Two-Time, who they fire back at and kill. Vic picks up Two-Time's gun off his body and shoots Terry in the face (without informing follow Team members Detective Curtis "Lem" Lemansky and Detective Ronnie Gardocki), making it look like Terry was murdered by Two-Time himself. Gilroy assists Vic in covering up the murder, which stops Aceveda's investigation. Things come to a breaking point towards the end of the season when Gilroy's own ambitions threaten both Vic's and Aceveda's futures.

Separately, rookie officer Julien Lowe learns the ropes from his training officer Danielle "Danny" Sofer, while attempting to hide his homosexuality from other officers. Julien witnesses the Strike Team smuggling a portion of a drug bust for their own personal wealth and reports it to Aceveda. When Aceveda begins to investigate Julien's claims, Vic threatens to reveal Julien's homosexuality to the department, causing Julien to back out from his witness statement and leaving Aceveda with nothing to go on.

Partners Detective Holland "Dutch" Wagenbach and Detective Claudette Wyms hunt a serial killer targeting prostitutes while dealing with their own problems in The Barn. Vic, separately, has to deal with the growing rift between him and his wife Corrine. After learning his son Matthew is autistic, Vic uses his illicit police activities to pay for special schooling for him. Due to Vic's reckless behavior, Corrine takes the children and disappears, leaving a note to Vic not to come and find them.

No. overall	No. in season	Title	Directed by	Written by	Original release date	Prod. code	U.S. viewers (millions)
1	1	"Pilot"	Clark Johnson	Shawn Ryan	March 12, 2002	5012-01-179	4.83
Eighteen months into the "Farmington Project", Detective Vic Mackey and his Strike Team prepare to take down a major drug dealer who has never before been caught with product. Meanwhile, following a homicide, Detectives Claudette Wyms and "Dutch" Wagenbach discover that a child is missing, sold to a pedophile by her drug-addicted father. Claudette and Wagenbach interrogate the pedophile and, after he refuses to share anything, they get Mackey to brutally interrogate him and get the address of where the girl is. Captain David Aceveda installs Detective Terry Crowley as a new member of the Strike Team in order to have an inside man to root out their corruption. After Mackeys interrogation of the pedophile, Claudette, Wagenbach, and Aceveda rescue the young girl. The episode ends with Mackey taking the opportunity to kill Crowley during a high-risk drug raid.
2	2	"Our Gang"	Gary Fleder	Shawn Ryan	March 19, 2002	5012-01-101	4.01
After the death of a member of the Strike Team on a high-risk raid, Aceveda begins to investigate the real circumstances behind the raid. Officers Julien and Danny find a dying man being mugged, eventually linked to a Mexican gang.
3	3	"The Spread"	Clark Johnson	Glen Mazzara	March 26, 2002	5012-01-103	3.34
It's Sweep-day on the Farm, with all outstanding warrants to be served. Mackey and the Strike Team move to take down an old foe, arresting a basketball star in the process, seeing a chance to affect sports history and make some money in the process.
4	4	"Dawg Days"	Stephen Gyllenhaal	Kevin Arkadie	April 2, 2002	5012-01-102	2.63
A gunfight breaks out in a crowded club between two local rappers which could potentially start a gang war. To further complicate matters, one of Mackey's contacts was involved in the shootout. Mackey and the Strike Team try to prevent the conflict from escalating. Aceveda, trying to gain political favors, tasks Dutch and Wyms with investigating a disappearance of a migrant worker.
5	5	"Blowback"	Clark Johnson	Kurt Sutter	April 9, 2002	5012-01-104	3.62
Aceveda insists that Mackey take uniformed cops in with them to bust an Armenian gang's drug delivery. After the bust, Margos Dezerian is caught among the Armenian gang and Julien sees the Team take a portion of the drugs for themselves. But in the end Shane ends up having the drugs and the vehicle they're in stolen from them. While the search for the drugs and the truck goes on, Mackey learns that his son is autistic.
6	6	"Cherrypoppers"	D. J. Caruso	Scott Rosenbaum	April 16, 2002	5012-01-105	3.49
When the body of a young hooker is found in the district, Dutch and Claudette get the full resources of the Barn for 24 hours and the help of the FBI to search for Dutch's serial killer. Meanwhile, The Strike Team busts an underage prostitution ring, and Capt. Aceveda continues to investigate Mackey.
7	7	"Pay in Pain"	D. J. Caruso	Shawn Ryan	April 23, 2002	5012-01-106	2.90
When Mackey and Shane hook up with a cop from another precinct to investigate the shooting, Shane sets off an explosive confrontation with a suspect by making a racial slur; fortunately, Mackey defuses the situation. Dutch and Claudette search for a serial killer and bring in a psychic on a complaint from the son of one of her clients, and Aceveda calls internal affairs after getting Julien's affidavit.
8	8	"Cupid & Psycho"	Guy Ferland	Glen Mazzara	April 30, 2002	5012-01-107	2.22
Allegations against the Strike Team are front-page news, and the team is broken up pending the investigation. Mackey threatens to reveal that Julien is gay if he won't recant his statement about the Strike Team. In the meantime, Mackey and Claudette find themselves following the trail of a batch of "cupid" meth, while Shane and Dutch try to get along on an old homicide case that was left unsolved by a retired detective.
9	9	"Throwaway"	Leslie Libman	Kevin Arkadie	May 7, 2002	5012-01-108	2.05
A planted gun in a truck-jacking case causes complications for the Strike Team, and now they're left to clean up their own mess. The rift between Julien and Danny deepens, causing Aceveda to intervene. Claudette deals with the mess of her family during a visit from her daughter.
10	10	"Dragonchasers"	Nick Gomez	Scott Rosenbaum & Kurt Sutter	May 14, 2002	5012-01-109	2.58
Mackey helps Connie quit her crack addiction by going cold-turkey in her desperate attempt to keep her son, leaving Shane and Lem to investigate a strip-club mugging ring. Dutch follows his instincts on a serial killer case and Danny is bitten by an HIV-infected perpetrator. Aceveda is forced to face a ghost from his past.
11	11	"Carnivores"	Scott Brazil	Story by : James Manos, Jr. Teleplay by : Kevin Arkadie & Glen Mazzara	May 21, 2002	5012-01-110	2.56
The Strike Team mediates a dispute between Rondell Robinson and the Nation of Islam while Dutch and Claudette investigate a brutal home invasion in the tight lipped Korean community. Aceveda revisits his past.
12	12	"Two Days of Blood"	Guy Ferland	Kurt Sutter & Scott Rosenbaum	May 28, 2002	5012-01-111	3.08
While Mackey answers Assistant Chief Gilroy's call for help in covering up a hit and run before Dutch intuits the facts of the case, Shane and Lem follow the trail of a gunrunner with a penchant for cockfights. Aceveda turns to Claudette after a double homicide raises ire and fear within an ignored community.
13	13	"Circles"	Scott Brazil	Shawn Ryan	June 4, 2002	5012-01-112	4.14
In the aftermath of a riot, cops are being lured into ambush shootings by a rash of bogus 911 calls. Mackey and Captain Aceveda must work together to stop these attacks and solve the problems in The Grove, while Assistant Chief Gilroy tries to pit the two against each other to save his own job.

=== Season 2 (2003) ===
The Barn discovers that the Mexican drug gangs in Farmington are uniting under a new drug lord, Armadillo Quintero, who is able to evade arrest due to lack of evidence and willing witnesses. Privately, the Strike Team learns that Armadillo has knowledge of some of their illicit activities and fear he will rat them out if he is taken to prison. They attempt to coerce Armadillo to return to Mexico by threatening to "greenlight" Armadillo's brother Navaro. Armadillo responds by having Navaro murdered himself. After Armadillo murders one of Vic's CIs, Vic loses his cool and burns half of Armadillo's face on a stove burner only for Armadillo to later retaliate by doing the same to Ronnie and using his new leverage against the Strike Team.

With the fallout of Gilroy's arrest, Vic and Aceveda find themselves under scrutiny of an independent auditor who is determined to find and expose any corruption in The Barn. As Vic and Aceveda struggle to stay one step ahead, their tactics draw the ire of Claudette, who is determined to arrest Armadillo after he rapes a young girl. Claudette, initially reluctant to take a leadership role, eventually agrees to take over as The Barn's Captain after realizing she can't stay neutral anymore. Meanwhile, Danny kills a Muslim man who threatened her during a confrontation and Julien is unable to corroborate her story. The man's widow threatens to sue the department and creates problems for Danny both professionally and personally.

Shane and Lem convince a small-time criminal to kill Armadillo by passing him a knife after he is arrested and put into the cage by Danny, leading to Danny being fired. Separately, Vic hires a private investigator to search for Corrine and the children, and discovers her seemingly preparing to file for divorce. He moves out of his home and preemptively files first in an attempt to gain a better chance of retaining his parenting rights, but this only serves to widen the distance between him and Corrine.

As the Armadillo case is resolved, the Strike Team learn that the Armenian Mob have a "money train" that passes through Farmington every so often, a means for the mob to launder their illegal funds into untraceable cash. The Strike Team privately plans to rob the money train, knowing that they would be financially secure for a long time should they succeed. The money train heist is successful, while Aceveda wins the city council primary.

No. overall	No. in season	Title	Directed by	Written by	Original release date	Prod. code	U.S. viewers (millions)
14	1	"The Quick Fix"	Scott Brazil	Shawn Ryan & Glen Mazzara	January 7, 2003	5012-02-201	4.43
While Mackey searches for his wife and children, the Strike Team allow more drugs into Farmington through a corrupt connection. But when their latest shipment turns bad, they head to Tijuana to uncover the person behind their tainted cocaine. Dutch and Claudette try to track down the man responsible for fire necklacing the captains of two separate gangs.
15	2	"Dead Soldiers"	John Badham	Kurt Sutter	January 14, 2003	5012-02-202	3.16
As Mackey gets closer to finding his family, the Strike Team focuses their attention to Armadillo after he burns down Tio's HQ. Mackey must now prevent Claudette from finding out the truth about his connection to Tio and his men. Dutch is followed around by the new civilian auditor to solve a meter-maid murder, and Danny and Julien try to clear up issues between feuding neighbors.
16	3	"Partners"	Guy Ferland	Scott Rosenbaum	January 21, 2003	5012-02-203	3.76
Still fuming from the death of Tio and his brawl with Armadillo, Mackey takes a day off and leaves the Strike Team with Aceveda, only to end up helping an old partner bust the man who helped him lose his job. Dutch and Claudette search to find the people behind the torture and mutilation of a woman who may still be alive, and Julien fails to back up Danny's side of the story from her shooting.
17	4	"Carte Blanche"	Peter Horton	Reed Steiner	January 28, 2003	5012-02-204	3.12
Now that Mackey is back to work, he and Shane go undercover as dirty cops to find the man behind a robbery/murder. Dutch and Claudette track down an old rival of Claudette after a turned in gun is connected to a previous case. In an attempt to get the Asian vote in the election, Aceveda assigns Julien and Danny to watch over a Korean parish.
18	5	"Greenlit"	Terrence O'Hara	Kim Clements	February 4, 2003	5012-02-205	3.00
Aceveda works with Mackey and the Strike Team to take down a dealer giving heroin to school kids, while Dutch and Claudette help a woman find her Alzheimer-addled mother.
19	6	"Homewrecker"	Scott Brazil	Shawn Ryan & Glen Mazzara	February 11, 2003	5012-02-206	2.92
Detectives Dutch, Mackey and Claudette investigate a massacre at a women's shelter, and Captain Aceveda works with Julien on the case of a stolen bicycle.
20	7	"Barnstormers"	Scott Winant	Scott Rosenbaum	February 18, 2003	5012-02-207	2.79
Mackey and Emma try to help a woman in an abusive relationship. Mackey and the Strike Team begin to make plans for the Money Train take down, even though the greenlight still has them on their toes. When Aceveda tells Dutch that he embarrassed the department with the Bob & Marcy case and that Claudette is now lead on all their cases, he's forced to take any action necessary to prove himself in a new homicide. Danny finally makes a stand against Yassirah.
21	8	"Scar Tissue"	Paris Barclay	Kurt Sutter	February 25, 2003	5012-02-208	3.25
When Mackey discovers that Gardocki has been burned as payback, the rest of the team does everything they can to put an end to Armadillo. Claudette makes headway on her investigation against Mackey after a conversation with Corrine, and Dutch takes Danny under his wing as they try to find the suspect of a Thai Town beating.
22	9	"Co-Pilot"	Peter Horton	Shawn Ryan & Glen Mazzara	March 4, 2003	5012-02-209	3.03
Flashback to the first day of the Barn. Under pressure to get results, Mackey and his new Strike Team make an impression on the streets. Dutch and Claudette realize they make a good team, and Aceveda discovers he doesn't have as much power as he thought that he would.
23	10	"Coyotes"	Davis Guggenheim	Reed Steiner	March 11, 2003	5012-02-210	3.20
When Lanie's report on the Barn is leaked to the press, everyone suddenly fears for their jobs, including Aceveda, mentioned as the reason for most of the problems. Mackey and Shane deal with a bail-skipping Gilroy while Lem shows the newest member of the Strike Team the ropes. Claudette faces some of her own demons as she and Dutch try to uncover the culprit behind a possible robbery/homicide and Danny comes to a startling realization.
24	11	"Inferno"	Brad Anderson	Story by : James Manos, Jr. & Kim Clements; Teleplay by : Kim Clements	March 18, 2003	5012-02-211	3.30
His face healed, Gardocki comes up with a plan to take down the Money Train. A federal criminal comes back to Farmington, and the Team tries to use every connection trick and resource to bring him in to prove the Barn is still powerful. Dutch and Claudette investigate the rape of a young girl which leads to information that puts the case in a new light. Plus, an old friend from the past reappears to make Julien's life hell.
25	12	"Breakpoint"	Félix Alcalá	Glen Mazzara	March 25, 2003	5012-02-212	3.22
While the Strike Team puts the finishing touches on the money train take down, Mackey works with Dutch and Claudette to find a missing child. Aceveda gets an unwanted visit from the Chief, and Julien receives an unpleasant surprise.
26	13	"Dominoes Falling"	Scott Brazil	Shawn Ryan	April 1, 2003	5012-02-213	3.67
When a gang execution hits close to home for Claudette, Mackey, Garris, and Dutch work together to find the culprit before anyone else gets hurt. Shane, Lem, and Gardocki are forced to choose between hitting the Money Train without Mackey or letting it go. Danny receives some life changing news and Julien's harassment reaches a whole new level.

=== Season 3 (2004) ===
In the aftermath of the money train heist, the Strike Team resolves to lie low and avoid any controversy but quickly find themselves marginalized and lacking vital information. When some of the money from the heist is revealed to be marked for a federal case, the Team struggles to stay ahead of Dutch, who begins to suspect Vic. The Armenian mob sends hitman Margos Dezerian to find the money and kill anyone suspected of involvement in the robbery. As both Margos and the investigation close in on the Strike Team, a fearful Lem burns a majority of the money in a desperate attempt to protect the Team, ultimately leading to a confrontation which causes the group to disband.

Claudette is promised a promotion to Captain and maintains a supervising role while Aceveda prepares to move on to the city council. However, a defense attorney is killed, and the ensuing investigation leads Claudette and Dutch to discover that the victim had been a heavy drug user for the past three years. Claudette, determined to ensure justice, investigates further, losing favor with the D.A. and Barn coworkers after she reopens the attorney's closed cases against orders and resulting in her being denied the promotion to Captain.

Shane enters a serious relationship with a woman named Mara and eventually proposes to her when she reveals her pregnancy. Mara encourages Shane to be more independent from Vic, even after discovering the money from the heist. This conflict between Vic and Shane soon becomes personal, leaving a deep rift between the two.

Dutch opens a case of a serial rapist and finds himself becoming more obsessed than usual without Claudette's backing. Julien, having suffering a beating from his coworkers after being outed as gay, has toughened considerably, leading Claudette to feel alarmed that he may wash out. Danny makes a deal with Aceveda to be reinstated provided she give him pertinent information about other officers.

No. overall	No. in season	Title	Directed by	Written by	Original release date	Prod. code	U.S. viewers (millions)
27	1	"Playing Tight"	Clark Johnson	Shawn Ryan & Kurt Sutter	March 9, 2004	5012-03-301	2.82
The Strike Team's attempt to play by the book comes to an abrupt end when they discover that two gangs, the Byz Latz and the One-Niners, are attempting to alter the balance of power by acquiring MP5 submachineguns. Claudette and Dutch investigate the murders and feet amputations of four Armenian men by Armenian mobsters searching for the stolen cash from the money train. Meanwhile, Danny, who is doing temp work at a high school while waiting for an appeal, discovers that she might be able to get her old job back.
28	2	"Blood and Water"	Clark Johnson	Charles H. Eglee & Kim Clements	March 16, 2004	5012-03-302	2.66
Tension within the group begins to mount as the Strike Team attempts to rectify a mistake Vic made, when he decided to use some of the cash from the stolen money train during a botched gun-running sting. Meanwhile, Dutch and Claudette seek the help of a college honor student named Esteban, the only survivor in the murder of two Latino gang members, one of them his close friend.
29	3	"Bottom Bitch"	Scott Brazil	Scott Rosenbaum & Adam E. Fierro	March 23, 2004	5012-03-303	3.32
A prostitute seeks the help of the police in her quest to bring down her pimp. Claudette assigns Vic to the case against his wishes, which puts him on the verge of going over the edge. Dutch uncovers a disturbing trend of rapes, and a politician is arrested for solicitation.
30	4	"Streaks and Tips"	Scott Brazil	Glen Mazzara	March 30, 2004	5012-03-304	2.64
The newly arrived Decoy Squad and the Strike Team go head to head in the investigation to solve a car-jacking case. Dutch gets in over his head on an attempted murder case.
31	5	"Mum"	Nick Gomez	Kurt Sutter & Shawn Ryan	April 6, 2004	5012-03-305	2.40
Vic struggles with Claudette's new supervision of the Strike Team. Marked bills lead Aceveda and a federal agent closer to the truth about the Armenian money-train heist, in an episode with a recurring motif of people not reporting crimes against them. In the episode Aceveda is held at gunpoint by two thugs and forced to perform oral sex on one of them.
32	6	"Posse Up"	Félix Alcalá	Kim Clements & Charles H. Eglee	April 13, 2004	5012-03-306	2.59
When the ex-wife and child of Julien's former partner Tommy, are murdered, Tommy becomes a suspect, prompting Julien to team up with Mackey to conduct their own investigation. Elsewhere, Shane goes undercover to catch a group attacking gay prostitutes, and Claudette and Dutch investigate a rape case against Aceveda's orders.
33	7	"Safe"	Peter Horton	Adam E. Fierro	April 20, 2004	5012-03-307	2.61
Vic and the Strike Team decide to take risky measures to protect themselves from being linked to the Money Train heist. Unfortunately, their plan is interrupted when one of Vic's open cases is suddenly linked to a narcocorrido song.
34	8	"Cracking Ice"	Guy Ferland	Charles H. Eglee & Diego Gutierrez	April 27, 2004	5012-03-308	2.22
An oversight puts Waylon and Trish in serious danger during an undercover job and Claudette is to blame. Meanwhile, Tommy makes a drastic decision when he realizes nobody in the Barn can help him get back on the job.
35	9	"Slipknot"	Michael Chiklis	Kurt Sutter	May 4, 2004	5012-03-309	2.53
When two high-profile murders are linked to each other, Aceveda orders Claudette to get the entire Barn involved before gang and racial violence breaks out. Mackey uses the case to leverage himself and the Strike Team back into the streets of Farmington.
36	10	"What Power Is..."	Dean White	Kim Clements	May 11, 2004	5012-03-310	2.36
Aceveda finds himself in a near-fatal confrontation, and enlists Vic to help him take down the suspects in order to help service his own personal agenda. Meanwhile, after losing her position of power, Claudette rejoins Dutch on the search for the cuddler rapist as they get a stunning break in the case.
37	11	"Strays"	David Mamet	Glen Mazzara	May 18, 2004	5012-03-311	2.27
During a routine bust on bangers, Vic and the Team discover a money laundering ring that reaches far and wide in the crime community. Meanwhile, Dutch takes the chilling confession of the man who was arrested in the serial-rape case, and Danny goes undercover.
38	12	"Riceburner"	Scott Brazil	Adam E. Fierro & Scott Rosenbaum	May 25, 2004	5012-03-312	2.52
When Aceveda assigns the Strike Team to serve a high-risk warrant against a mob killer to service his political agenda, they find themselves embroiled in a hostile struggle with the Korean community. Now the Team must find out how to put an end to the situation before they end up casualties of a racial feud. Meanwhile, one of Vic's informants works with Danny on finding stolen chairs, while having eyes for her.
39	13	"Fire in the Hole"	Guy Ferland	Kurt Sutter & Charles H. Eglee	June 1, 2004	5012-03-313	2.28
When a mole in the treasury department is discovered and the framed suspect in the Armenian money train robbery turns up missing, the Strike team race to find the suspect before their cover is blown. Meanwhile, Claudette attempts to make amends with the Decoy Squad by going undercover to help them on a case.
40	14	"All In"	Stephen Kay	Scott Rosenbaum	June 8, 2004	5012-03-314	2.42
With the Armenian hitman, Margos Dezerian, hot on their trail, the Strike team sweeps the streets of the Armenian community to find him before he finds them. After catching a break, Aceveda's suspicions grow about the Strike Team's involvement with the Money Train robbery. Meanwhile, Dutch and Claudette investigate a case that could repeal hundreds of convictions, which leaves Claudette having to choose between her conscience and her career.
41	15	"On Tilt"	Scott Brazil	Shawn Ryan & Glen Mazzara	June 15, 2004	5012-03-315	2.10
When Aceveda confirms that the Strike Team is the target of an Armenian mob hitman, Margos Dezerian, Mackey must take matters into his own hands. Meanwhile, Claudette's career is on the line when she disobeys Aceveda's orders to put a case to rest that may prove the innocence of convicted felons.

=== Season 4 (2005) ===
Monica Rawling (Glenn Close) takes over the role as Farmington's new captain, and implements federal asset forfeiture laws to seize any property tied to drug dealing, using the money to fund the department and give back to the community. This soon becomes controversial among The Barn, particularly Julien, and members of the Farmington community. After the Strike Team's disbandment, Shane works in Vice with new partner Armando "Army" Renta (Michael Peña). The pair enter into a dangerous situation when trying to control major drug lord Antwon Mitchell (Anthony Anderson), who blackmails them and coerces Shane into accepting an order to kill Vic. The police are outraged after two officers are kidnapped and subsequently found murdered. In the end, the Strike Team is re-formed and manages to put Antwon in prison. Rawling eventually loses her position over a dispute with the DEA.

Meanwhile, Dutch and Claudette are "blacklisted" as detectives because of the latter's refusal to apologize to the D.A. after her reopening the cases of the murdered defense attorney resulted in many of the prosecutor's cases being overturned. Dutch attempts to resolve the situation by making a back-room deal with the D.A. to keep an eye on Claudette and do favors for the office in return for breaking back into action. Ultimately, this causes a rift between the partners, culminating in a confrontation where Claudette rebukes Dutch for making the deal.

No. overall	No. in season	Title	Directed by	Written by	Original release date	Prod. code	U.S. viewers (millions)
42	1	"The Cure"	Scott Brazil	Glen Mazzara	March 15, 2005	5012-04-401	3.93
Vic is no longer the cop he used to be, acting adrift after his past actions have caught up to him. The Strike Team has dissolved, leaving Mackey to menial busts that keep him off the streets. When Aceveda moves on to his new City Council position, Captain Monica Rawling takes over the Barn and empowers Vic to implement her controversial anti-gang policies.
43	2	"Grave"	Paris Barclay	Kurt Sutter	March 22, 2005	5012-04-402	3.25
Mackey tries to help an old acquaintance find a wayward teenager, but the search quickly turns ugly when the missing teen appears to have been involved in a shoot-out. Meanwhile, Shane heads out into the field with his new partner Army, teaching him shady police tactics and seeing how far he'll go to be partnered up. Plus, Aceveda spends his last day trying to bury Vic for good, which makes things difficult for Rawling trying to take his place.
44	3	"Bang"	Guy Ferland	Scott Rosenbaum	March 29, 2005	5012-04-403	2.87
With Farmington on the brink of a gang war, Monica and Vic race to find the catalyst and stop the bloodshed, enlisting Antwon's help along the way. Still in the doghouse, Dutch decides to take action in thawing the relationship between Claudette and the D.A. Danny and Julien get up close and personal with the Farmington 1-Niners, while Monica looks to Vic for support when the implementation of her property seizure policy challenges her morality.
45	4	"Doghouse"	Dean White	Adam E. Fierro	April 5, 2005	5012-04-404	3.08
When Monica puts Vic on the trail of an escaped fugitive in Farmington, he must continue to prove his worth while playing it straight. Claudette gets suspicious of the D.A's motives when she and Dutch are assigned to investigate a major drug dealer who ends up being a minor offender. David seeks an illicit outlet for the troubling feelings caused by his rape. Vic decides to bring Shane closer as his fears about Shane's connection to Antwon Mitchell rise.
46	5	"Tar Baby"	Guy Ferland	Charles H. Eglee	April 12, 2005	5012-04-405	2.95
A tip from Lem's juvie leads Vic and Monica to take down a major heroin operation with connections to Antwon Mitchell. Monica continues to battle Aceveda as she tries to sell her new policies to the community, and Julien begins to doubt her methods. Claudette loses trust in Dutch when she suspects he made a backroom deal with the D.A. And Shane and Army find themselves in over their heads with Antwon when he blames them for Vic's heroin bust.
47	6	"Insurgents"	Vondie Curtis-Hall	Elizabeth Craft & Sarah Fain	April 19, 2005	5012-04-406	3.41
Vic and Monica strike a deal with the DEA to shut down Mitchell's tar heroin operation. When the bust comes up empty, Vic's suspicions of Shane grow, until Shane proves himself by coming up with a key piece of evidence that reveals a large stash of tar being stored at a local church. Meanwhile, Dutch and Claudette's friendship continues to feel strain as they try to tie a young woman's murder to a suspected serial killer. Plus, Julien takes a stand against Monica's policy, then goes to David for support when she suggests he consider transferring out of Farmington.
48	7	"Hurt"	Nick Gomez	Scott Rosenbaum & Lia L. Langworthy	April 26, 2005	5012-04-407	3.07
Just as Monica and Vic get close to a big break in the Garage Sting, Chief Phillips unexpectedly hands over the bust to the Organized Crime Unit. He blames the decision on an emerging PR scandal involving a videotape of Vic at the church bust that was leaked to the Assistant Chief through Aceveda's office. Vic uses his leverage with the Byz Lats to find a Russian mob leader before the mobster flees the country. Monica threatens two foster care social workers with jail after a young girl is found close to death in her foster home, then tells Julien if he doesn't put in for a transfer, she'll request one for him herself.
49	8	"Cut Throat"	Dean White	Story by : Randy Huggins & Glen Mazzara; Teleplay by : Jennifer R. Richmond & Glen Mazzara	May 3, 2005	5012-04-408	3.22
Monica and Vic rush to get their informants off the street after two C.I's are found brutally murdered. Meanwhile, as Dutch and Claudette investigate a brutal beating and robbery, a case from the past forces Dutch to take one in the line of duty. Plus, Vic suspects he's being set up when Shane comes to him after his situation with Antwon and Halpern spins out of control.
50	9	"String Theory"	Philip G. Atwell	Charles H. Eglee & Shawn Ryan	May 17, 2005	5012-04-409	3.21
Monica orders her units to turn the streets of Farmington inside-out when two officers mysteriously disappear after answering a 911 call. Shane tries to make amends with his old crew after Vic agrees to help him get out from under Antwon, but things don't work out as planned. Dutch and Claudette convince Monica to let them take active roles in the case of the missing officers, but soon find themselves at a dead end with the only witness being clinically insane.
51	10	"Back in the Hole"	Scott Brazil	Story by : Shawn Ryan; Teleplay by : Elizabeth Craft & Sarah Fain	May 24, 2005	5012-04-410	3.33
Vic and Shane confess to Captain Rawling about the hidden videotape and information about Antwon and Angie's body. Monica forces them to take a polygraph. Aceveda goes overboard with the hooker and realizes he's not "a good man" for doing so. He ends the relationship.
52	11	"A Thousand Deaths"	Stephen Kay	Story by : Shawn Ryan; Teleplay by : Adam E. Fierro	May 31, 2005	5012-04-411	3.04
Vic and the Strike Team use their leverage on the One-Niners to track down anyone involved with the cop killings. Their hunt leads them down an unexpected path with the Russian mob. Monica puts pressure on the team to come clean about any of their dealings with Antwon. Dutch and Claudette investigate a gang shooting and soon realize their key witness is close to the Barn, and has something to hide.
53	12	"Judas Priest"	David Von Ancken	Story by : Kurt Sutter & Charles H. Eglee; Teleplay by : Kurt Sutter & Scott Rosenbaum	June 7, 2005	5012-04-412	2.66
Vic tracks down the Russian involved in the cop-killers but an accidental explosion kills him. Vic discovers Antwon had a half-brother and his involvement with the murdered cops. Aceveda is blackmailed by the man who raped him. Antwon cuts a deal with DEA.
54	13	"Ain't That a Shame"	Stephen Kay	Story by : Shawn Ryan & Kurt Sutter; Teleplay by : Shawn Ryan & Glen Mazzara	June 14, 2005	5012-04-413	3.19
Enraged by the prospect of Antwon Mitchell's release from prison, Monica Rawling decides to go behind the DEA's back. She asks the Strike Team to find and arrest the Salvadoran drug lord Mitchell is to provide information about before the DEA does. The Strike Team is successful but Monica loses her job after an angry DEA chief threatens to cut off federal funding from Los Angeles unless she is fired. Rawling stays at the Barn just long enough to arrest Mitchell upon his arrival. Danny goes home from the hospital and is tended to by Julien. The Internal Affairs detective that Rawling called reports to her and informs her that they discovered the packet of heroin in Lem's car and switched it for a fake.

=== Season 5 (2006) ===
Internal Affairs Division Lieutenant Jon Kavanaugh (Forest Whitaker) begins an investigation into Vic and the Strike Team. Previously, Lem had stolen heroin as leverage for information on the disappearance of a young girl he was close to. Emolia Melendez, an informant, witnessed the theft and reported it to IAD. Finding the heroin gave IAD sufficient evidence to arrest Lem, but Kavanaugh, suspecting that Vic murdered Terry Crowley, informs Lem of his theory and coerces Lem into wearing a wire to get evidence on the Strike Team. Lem is able to warn Vic that he is wired and Mackey uses it against Kavanaugh to embarrass him and IAD.

Kavanaugh responds by moving his investigation into the Barn, causing anxiety for everyone inside. Applying pressure to the team in any way he can, Kavanaugh finds out about Mackey's share of the money train haul after interrogating Corrine. Kavanaugh's mentally ill wife Sadie comes into play when she falsely accuses a man of raping her. Vic and Lem view a personal conversation between Kavanaugh and Sadie from the interrogation room camera, which Kavanaugh quickly realizes is turned on. He rushes out in a rage, and Vic and Lem quickly exit the security monitor room, but Kavanaugh sees them and arrests Lem on the spot.

Kavanaugh freezes the Strike Team's assets but Vic manages to secure bail money for Lem and assists in providing safe passage for him to leave the country. However, Shane worries Lem will turn. Kavanaugh orders Aceveda to lie to Vic and say that Lem had revealed the Strike Team's involvement in the robbery of the Armenian money train. Shane falls for the deception and murders Lem with a hand grenade. After Lem's body is discovered, Vic vows to find the killer.

Other plots include Dutch discovering Claudette has lupus and Claudette's subsequently reaching her physical breaking point after finally getting a serial killer from their past to confess. Steve Billings functions as the interim "jellyfish yes-man" Captain of the Barn while Danny deals with pregnancy and refuses to divulge the baby's father, who is eventually revealed to be Vic. Julien trains Tina, a beautiful but incompetent rookie officer, and at long last Claudette gets her opportunity for promotion to captain of the Barn, which she accepts on the sole condition that she gets to run the Barn her way.

No. overall	No. in season	Title	Directed by	Written by	Original release date	Prod. code	U.S. viewers (millions)
55	1	"Extraction"	D. J. Caruso	Kurt Sutter	January 10, 2006	5012-05-501	3.42
Dutch and Claudette investigate a riot at a high school that stemmed from racial tensions. Lem gets an unexpected visit from Internal Affairs Lt. Jon Kavanaugh. Julien tries out his new role as training officer for rookie Tina Hanlon, and Danny refuses to disclose the father of her baby.
56	2	"Enemy of Good"	Guy Ferland	Charles H. Eglee & Adam E. Fierro	January 17, 2006	5012-05-502	2.81
Lem is interrogated by Kavanaugh and Aceveda about the Strike Team's corrupt past. The Strike Team investigates multiple homicides and an extortion scam, and Dutch and Claudette investigate a preacher for attempted murder. Hanlon causes problems for Julien and Danny.
57	3	"Jailbait"	Stephen Kay	Scott Rosenbaum & Glen Mazzara	January 24, 2006	5012-05-503	2.85
The Strike Team figures out their next step concerning Internal Affairs' investigation into Lem; they send Hanlon undercover to help take down a sex-trafficking operation. Dutch feels betrayed by Claudette when she re-opens one of his cases, and Mackey comes face-to-face with Kavanaugh.
58	4	"Tapa Boca"	Guy Ferland	Elizabeth Craft & Sarah Fain	January 31, 2006	5012-05-504	2.61
Becca Doyle contemplates whether or not to represent the Strike Team in court, Mackey questions Emolia's loyalty. Dutch and Claudette investigate a case of road rage that escalated to a double homicide. Hanlon's continuing mistakes create friction between her and Julien, and Corrine has a confrontation with Kavanaugh.
59	5	"Trophy"	Philip G. Atwell	Kurt Sutter and Renee Palyo & Tony Soltis	February 7, 2006	5012-05-505	2.45
Kavanaugh bugs the Strike Team's clubhouse in an effort to get his stalled investigation back on track, as Mackey and the Strike Team investigate an illegal prescription drug ring. Dutch senses that Claudette is not being honest with him as they work a missing person's case.
60	6	"Rap Payback"	Michael Chiklis	Charles H. Eglee & Ted Griffin	February 14, 2006	5012-05-506	2.43
The walls close in on Mackey when Kavanaugh sets up office in the Barn. An elusive serial killer re-enters Dutch and Claudette's lives, and Hanlon's discovery of Julien's homosexual past adds a new level of tension to their relationship.
61	7	"Man Inside"	Dean White	Adam E. Fierro & Emily Lewis	February 21, 2006	5012-05-507	2.44
The Strike Team's solidarity begins to crack as Kavanaugh has Gardocki interrogated and he struggles to discover how Mackey got $65,000 that he gave to Corrine. The Strike Team investigates the murder of a drug dealer’s girlfriend and her daughter. Claudette's grueling effort to break Kleavon Gardner takes a toll on her health.
62	8	"Kavanaugh"	D. J. Caruso	Shawn Ryan & Scott Rosenbaum	February 28, 2006	5012-05-508	2.31
As Kavanaugh deals with the emotional circumstances surrounding the return of his ex-wife, he forges an unlikely alliance with Antwon Mitchell in his obsession to take down the Strike Team. Emoila, sent by Mackey, infiltrates a Salvadoran gang that has been stockpiling grenades. Kavanaugh takes a private moment with his mentally-ill wife in one of the interrogation rooms, realizing too late the whole emotional scene was in full view of the camera. Watchers Vic and Lem run from the recording room, but Kavanaugh sees them and furiously orders the immediate arrest of Lem. Lem's badge and gun are taken. Julien handcuffs him and takes him to the cage. Kavanaugh later visits Antwon Mitchell in Prison and agrees on a deal.
63	9	"Smoked"	Dean White	Sarah Fain & Elizabeth Craft & Glen Mazzara	March 7, 2006	5012-05-509	2.78
With their finances frozen by Kavanaugh, the Strike Team is forced to find another way to make bail for Lem. Hanlon's future at The Barn is in doubt when she jeopardizes the safety of an undercover detective, and Corrine decides to confront Danny about her baby's paternity.
64	10	"Of Mice and Lem"	Gwyneth Horder-Payton	Charles H. Eglee & Kurt Sutter	March 14, 2006	5012-05-510	2.56
Mackey strikes a deal with Antwon Mitchell that will guarantee Lem's safety in prison as Lem prepares to plead guilty. The deal unexpectedly goes awry, and Mackey takes drastic measures to protect Lem. A betrayal and uncontrollable circumstances threaten to damage Dutch and Claudette's longstanding friendship.
65	11	"Postpartum"	Stephen Kay	Adam E. Fierro & Shawn Ryan	March 21, 2006	5012-05-511	3.22
Mackey arranges to get Lem out of the country to a new life in Mexico. Aceveda and Kavanaugh join forces to nail Mackey for harboring a fugitive. Dutch files for a transfer, and Danny decides to inform her baby's father of his new child. Shane takes extreme steps to stop the investigation.

"Wins and Losses"

This 15-minute mini-episode was produced between the fifth and sixth seasons, and initially released to various websites in February 2007 as a promotion for season six. It was later made available on the Season 5 DVD set.

No.	Title	Directed by	Written by	Original release date
1	"Wins and Losses"	Kurt Sutter	Elizabeth A. Hansen & Lisa Randolph	February 15, 2007
After the funeral of Curtis Lemansky, Vic begins a personal investigation into his murder, attempting to get ahead of Dutch's official investigation. This is interspersed with flashbacks to a day two years prior, when Lem was the Barn's entrant in an annual inter-department arm wrestling competition.

=== Season 6 (2007) ===
Vic and the Strike Team are distraught over Lem's death. Shane, overcome by guilt, becomes reckless and suicidal and enters into an affair with a teenager associated with the new One-Niner boss. Kavanaugh, convinced that Vic killed Lem and desperate to close his case after being given a 24-hour turnaround deadline by the Assistant Chief, resorts to planting evidence and coercing witnesses to lie about the Strike Team. Dutch and Claudette begin to suspect Kavanaugh's integrity after holes in his investigation are discovered and Corrine reveals that Kavanaugh sexually assaulted her. Kavanaugh eventually confesses to his actions and is arrested.

Vic and Ronnie hunt Guardo Lima, a drug lord and overseer of a grenade factory that the Barn raided prior to Lem's death, where Shane pocketed the grenade he later used to kill Lem. After capturing Guardo, Vic tortures and murders him while Shane and Ronnie watch. Shane's subsequent behavior arouses suspicion in Vic and Ronnie, and after reviewing a report by Kavanaugh of the night Lem was killed, they both realize the truth. Vic gets Shane to confess, but Shane threatens to reveal the Strike Team's illegal exploits should Vic attempt to arrest him. Shane tries to get protection with the Armenians and recklessly reveals Vic was the ringleader behind the money train robbery, putting Vic's family in danger. However, Shane takes steps to rectify this mistake, kidnapping Corrine and Vic's daughter Cassidy before ambushing and severely wounding the Armenian hitman sent to kill them.

Vic learns from Claudette that the Chief plans to force him into early retirement. Claudette makes strong efforts to solve a brutal mass murder after learning the Barn could be shut down if no improvements are made by the time quarterly crime statistics are released. Julien joins the Strike Team under the leadership of Kevin Hiatt, brought in as Vic's replacement but nowhere near as effective as Vic. Aceveda finds a new backer for his mayoral campaign, real estate developer Cruz Pezuela. After Pezuela begins offering information into the pending San Marcos massacre investigation, Vic discovers that Pezuela has ties to the Mexican cartel and attempts to use this as blackmail against Pezuela to save his own job. In turn, Pezuela offers him a photo of Aceveda's sexual assault. Vic initially tries to use the photo against Aceveda, but the two eventually ally to take down Pezuela. Vic confronts Mexican intel operative Luis Aramboles and, upon searching the trunk of Aramboles' car, discovers a box filled with blackmail on government officials in Farmington. Vic and Aceveda plot to use this to serve their own respective interests.

No. overall	No. in season	Title	Directed by	Written by	Original release date	Prod. code	U.S. viewers (millions)
66	1	"On the Jones"	Michael Fields	Kurt Sutter	April 3, 2007	5012-05-512	2.08
With the Barn grieving over the loss of one of their own, Vic's quest to find his friend's killer puts him in the crosshairs of Kavanaugh. Things don't seem to go smoothly for Claudette when she attempts to settle into her new role as captain. Ronnie and Vic begin to worry about Shane's unusual behavior. Meanwhile, Dutch and Billings investigate a mass murder in San Marcos.
67	2	"Baptism by Fire"	Guy Ferland	Scott Rosenbaum	April 10, 2007	5012-05-513	2.35
As Kavanaugh closes in on him, Vic resorts to some extreme measures in order to find his best friend's killer. Claudette finds herself under the political microscope as a result of the San Marcos murders. Meanwhile, Danny receives some interesting news.
68	3	"Back to One"	Gwyneth Horder-Payton	Adam E. Fierro	April 17, 2007	5012-05-514	1.95
Vic receives bad news about his career as he comes close to apprehending Lem's suspected killer, while the secret Shane is keeping continues to eat away at him. Ronnie works with Dutch and Billings on a case. Meanwhile, Dutch finds himself in an awkward predicament with Tina.
69	4	"The New Guy"	Clark Johnson	Sarah Fain & Elizabeth Craft	April 24, 2007	5012-05-515	1.97
Claudette offers Vic a chance to keep his job; an unsolved case from Dutch and Claudette's past comes back to haunt them; an influential businessman may further Aceveda's political aspirations.
70	5	"Haunts"	Michael Chiklis	Glen Mazzara & Charles H. Eglee	May 1, 2007	5012-05-516	2.15
In a rush to avenge Lem's murder, Vic discovers he may have killed the wrong man; Billings helps Dutch makes headway in the serial-rapist case; Mara is furious when she discovers Shane's affair, so he confesses to murdering Lem.
71	6	"Chasing Ghosts"	Frank Darabont	Shawn Ryan & Adam E. Fierro	May 8, 2007	5012-05-517	1.87
Vic and Ronnie develop suspicions about Shane when they realize he does not want to find Lem's real killer after Vic finds out it wasn't Guardo.
72	7	"Exiled"	Dean White	Scott Rosenbaum & Kurt Sutter	May 15, 2007	5012-05-518	1.90
Shane tries to get the upper strategic hand on Vic; the Strike Team works with and tries to keep the cover of an undercover agent when trying to find a perp.
73	8	"The Math of the Wrath"	Rohn Schmidt	Charles H. Eglee	May 22, 2007	5012-05-519	1.47
Vic learns about his true status at the Barn from Hiatt. Shane gets involved with the daughter of an Armenian mob boss. Claudette begins to question Hiatt's loyalty.
74	9	"Recoil"	Guy Ferland	Sarah Fain & Elizabeth Craft & Adam E. Fierro	May 29, 2007	5012-05-520	1.74
Vic's time at the Barn seems to be running out, despite his work to help close the San Marcos murders. Billings' manipulations bring the tension between him and Dutch to a boil.
75	10	"Spanish Practices"	Paris Barclay	Shawn Ryan & Scott Rosenbaum	June 5, 2007	5012-05-521	2.06
Claudette notices Hiatt's mistake when he makes an arrest, and Billings delivers shocking news to the department. Vic forms an alliance with Aceveda, while he waits for his review board hearing. Meanwhile, Shane's life keeps spiraling out of control, as he tries to protect both his and Vic's family from the wrath of the Armenian mob.

=== Season 7 (2008) ===
Vic spins the blackmail box into a gang war between the Mexicans and Armenians as a way to protect himself and his family after Shane's reveal to the Armenians that Vic spearheaded the money train robbery. As the gang war spins out of control, Vic cozies up to ICE Agent Olivia Murray as a way to bring more weight down on the cartel and to secure an ICE position for himself and Ronnie, along with complete immunity for their past crimes.

Shane, despite holding his written confession as leverage over Vic and Ronnie, agrees to help stop the Armenian threat in order to protect his own family. Vic and Ronnie inform Shane of a plan to set up an arranged meeting between the Mexicans and Armenians with Shane as the middleman. Unbeknownst to Shane, Vic and Ronnie formulated the plan as a way to resolve all of their issues, including vengeance for Lem. Ronnie tampers with his sidearm in an attempt to get him killed by Mexican hitmen sent to kill Rezian and his men, who, along with Shane, think the meeting is to purchase the blackmail box that would subsequently be given back to Pezuela and end the gang war. Shane escapes and, after realizing that his partners set him up to die, blackmails a pimp from a previous investigation to help him perform simultaneous hits on Vic and Ronnie. The attempt fails and the pimp gives up Shane, forcing Shane to go on the run with Mara and their son Jackson.

Vic turns in his badge in order to focus on catching and killing Shane and the pregnant Mara. Mara uses Shane's leverage against Vic to coerce Corrine into serving as a middleman to help their family escape the police. Vic fails an attempt on Shane and Mara's lives after tracking them down to a hospital using information from both Corrine and Ronnie, driving Corrine to her breaking point. She contacts the Barn and agrees to help stop Vic as long as he never learns of her involvement. Dutch and Claudette begin a full-scale investigation into Vic and Ronnie in a final attempt to take down the remaining Strike Team members once and for all. After a failed attempt to incriminate Vic in the act of aiding and abetting Shane, Dutch fakes the arrest of Corrine in order to preserve her cover.

Vic, believing that Corrine was actually arrested, leverages the bust of the Mexican cartel into a full immunity for both of them. As part of his deal with ICE, Vic confesses to all the crimes he and Strike Team committed, incriminating Ronnie in the process and stunning Olivia and her boss, as well as Claudette and Dutch, who walk in too late to stop the deal. Claudette, her health still deteriorating, nearly breaks down upon learning of Vic's immunity. As a small bit of revenge and to protect Corrine, Claudette and Dutch make an arrangement with Olivia to place Corrine, Cassidy, Matthew, and Megan into federal witness protection.

Meanwhile, Shane, Mara, and Jackson return home after Mara is injured during a robbery. Shane attempts to blackmail Vic one final time, but Vic gloats to Shane about his immunity deal and Shane's inability to use the Strike Team's crimes as leverage. Shane, trying to prove he was always the better husband and father, reveals Corrine's betrayal. Officially out of options, Shane goes back to the house, where a neighbor spots him. He poisons Mara and Jackson and shoots himself after writing out his confession as Claudette and her team arrive to arrest him.

Vic and Ronnie lead the cartel and the leadership of the black gangs into an ICE trap, which Aceveda uses as a publicity stunt for his mayoral campaign. They return to the Barn, where Vic is informed by Claudette of Shane’s suicide. She orders him to the interrogation room and reads Shane's suicide note before placing the crime scene photos of Shane, Mara, and Jackson's corpses on the table and leaving the room. Realizing that Claudette is watching his reaction in the security monitor room, Vic stares into the camera before ripping it out of the wall in a rage. As Vic exits the room, he furiously says to bill him for it and Claudette replies that the "first payment's due now", before prompting Dutch to arrest Ronnie publicly for all the crimes Vic confessed to. Ronnie, led to believe that Vic that he had gotten immunity for both of them, screams that Vic betrayed him as Vic attempts to explain his actions. Ronnie is dragged from the premises as the entire Barn stares at Vic in contempt.

Later, Claudette admits to Dutch she’s dying but will remain Captain as long as she can while Corrine and the children arrive at their new home. Olivia, angry that Vic used her, relegates him to a job writing daily analysis reports at a desk for ICE. Vic, shocked by this information after assuming he'd be working on the street, argues it wasn’t the terms he agreed to, but Olivia reminds him that any step out of line to the word of their agreement will violate the terms of his immunity. In the final scene, Vic sits at his desk in the ICE office after hours, where he unpacks pictures of his children, as well as one of himself and Lem. After hearing police sirens, he rushes to the window and stares out at the street below before returning to his desk, removing his gun from a lockbox, and leaving.

No. overall	No. in season	Title	Directed by	Written by	Original release date	Prod. code	U.S. viewers (millions)
76	1	"Coefficient of Drag"	Guy Ferland	Kurt Sutter	September 2, 2008	5012-07-701	2.12
Vic confronts Shane and deals with threats to his family, including Armenian hitman Ari Zadofian. A federal agent arrives to investigate a recent wave of violence in Farmington.
77	2	"Snitch"	Gwyneth Horder-Payton	Gary Lennon	September 9, 2008	5012-07-702	1.66
A gang war heats up, enabling Vic to position himself as a valuable commodity to both sides. Corrine and Cassidy confront Vic.
78	3	"Money Shot"	Terrence O'Hara	Adam E. Fierro	September 16, 2008	5012-07-703	1.93
Corrine finds herself in legal trouble, Vic works an angle to make himself valuable to the Armenian mob and Tina targets a producer of adult entertainment. Cassidy's rage causes her to lash out at her mother.
79	4	"Genocide"	Dean White	Lisa Randolph	September 23, 2008	5012-07-704	1.56
Following a fire at an Armenian safe house, Rezian asks Vic to set up a meeting with the Mexicans. An angry Cassidy goes to Danny with questions about her father and Dutch questions a teenager that shot an intruder.
80	5	"Game Face"	Michael Chiklis	Charles H. Eglee	September 30, 2008	5012-07-705	1.48
When the daughter of a drug kingpin is kidnapped, the Strike Team must free her, without drawing attention to the fact that Agent Olivia Murray is following them. The serial killer Kleavon Gardner, soon to go on trial and defending himself, hits a nerve when he deposes Claudette; Dutch continues his effort to unmask teenager Lloyd as a potential serial killer, Danny pressures Vic to sign away his parental rights to their child and Shane tries to turn Ronnie against Vic. Vic must also continue to deal with Cassidy's downward spiral.
81	6	"Animal Control"	Gwyneth Horder-Payton	John Hlavin & Angela Russo	October 7, 2008	5012-07-706	1.15
Vic and Ronnie set up a Mexican–Armenian meeting but tell the two sides different things, while keeping some pertinent details from Shane. Shane and former Strike Team adversary Tavon Garris team up uneasily as a six-year-old murder case heats up. Ellis Rezian is gunned down and Shane barely makes it out alive, realizing that he was set up to be killed along with Rezian by Vic and Ronnie. Ronnie gets a warning from Claudette about Vic's freelancing and a naked sleepwalker is found in a warehouse with blood on his body that isn't his own.
82	7	"Bitches Brew"	Stephen Kay	Charles H. Eglee & Elizabeth A. Hansen	October 14, 2008	5012-07-707	1.31
Vic's review board hearing is moved up unexpectedly, putting new pressure on his mission to take down Pezuela, which hits another snag when the Feds take over the investigation of Robert Martin's murder. Vic intensifies his quest to stay in his infant son's life, Shane tends to private business as he probes a prostitute's murder and Dutch is disturbed by what he finds at Claudette's house when he and Billings investigate a neighborhood break-in.
83	8	"Parricide"	Guy Ferland	Kurt Sutter & Gary Lennon	October 21, 2008	5012-07-708	1.61
Vic and Ronnie escape attempts on their lives and when Ronnie's assailant is caught, Shane must think and act quickly. With barely a week to go before he must turn in his badge, Vic offers Olivia a business proposition. He also has some dirty work to do for Pezuela, involving a priest whose church is in a location Pezuela finds inconvenient.
84	9	"Moving Day"	Rohn Schmidt	Adam E. Fierro & Lisa Randolph	October 28, 2008	5012-07-709	1.68
Vic closes in on Shane, Mara and their sick young son, Claudette dismantles the Strike Team, Pezuela offers Aceveda "assistance" for his mayoral campaign, Rita Denton comes on to Dutch, and Billings' ex-wife and daughter are fearful when a registered sex offender moves into their neighborhood.
85	10	"Party Line"	Gwyneth Horder-Payton	Angela Russo & John Hlavin	November 4, 2008	5012-07-710	1.49
While Shane remains holed up in L.A. with Mara and Jackson, Corrine decides to cooperate with Dutch and Claudette, who are now spearheading the LAPD effort to bring down Vic. Vic plays Aceveda, Pezuela, Beltran and ICE against each other. Ronnie is tempted to simply give up and run to Mexico, recommending that Vic run as well.
86	11	"Petty Cash"	Craig Brewer	Charles H. Eglee & Jameal Turner	November 11, 2008	5012-07-711	1.66
Corrine agrees to be Vic and Shane's go-between and also agrees to cooperate with Claudette and Dutch as she does so. Vic comes to an understanding with Aceveda and seeks one with Olivia. Claudette assigns Ronnie to work with Julien in order to investigate the murder of a high-school football star, keeping Ronnie out of the Barn, unable to intercept the letter Shane sent to Claudette detailing one of the Strike Team's "sins".
87	12	"Possible Kill Screen"	Billy Gierhart	Adam E. Fierro & Evan Bleiweiss	November 18, 2008	5012-07-712	1.60
Olivia joins forces with the remnants of the Strike Team to catch a Mexican drug lord and stop his shipment. Dutch is thrust into a position to clean up Billings' mess. Vic confesses to all his crimes, including the murders of Terry Crowley, Margos Dezerian, Guardo Lima and many others, in the hope that he will be protected under ICE's immunity deal, provided he helps secure Beltran's takedown.
88	13	"Family Meeting"	Clark Johnson	Shawn Ryan	November 25, 2008	5012-07-713	1.84
Hurrying to close in on Beltran, Vic learns of Corrine's betrayal. Shane, pinned down by the cops with his family, takes desperate action. An upstart mayoral candidate (played by Andre Benjamin) troubles Aceveda. Dutch interrogates Lloyd about Rita's disappearance.

== Ratings ==
The Shield : U.S. viewers per episode (millions)

Season	Episode number															Average
Season	1	2	3	4	5	6	7	8	9	10	11	12	13	14	15	Average
1	4.83	4.01	3.34	2.63	3.62	3.49	2.90	2.22	2.05	2.58	2.56	3.08	4.14	–		3.19
2	4.43	3.16	3.76	3.12	3.00	2.92	2.79	3.25	3.03	3.20	3.30	3.22	3.67	–		3.30
3	2.82	2.66	3.32	2.64	2.40	2.59	2.61	2.22	2.53	2.36	2.27	2.52	2.28	2.42	2.10	2.52
4	3.93	3.25	2.87	3.08	2.95	3.41	3.07	3.22	3.21	3.33	3.04	2.66	3.19	–		3.17
5	3.42	2.81	2.85	2.61	2.45	2.43	2.44	2.31	2.78	2.56	3.22	–				2.72
6	2.08	2.35	1.95	1.97	2.15	1.87	1.90	1.47	1.74	2.06	–					1.95
7	2.12	1.66	1.93	1.56	1.48	1.15	1.31	1.61	1.68	1.49	1.66	1.60	1.84	–		1.62

Audience measurement performed by Nielsen Media Research
