= Pilot (The Shield) =

Pilot episode of The Shield

- The Shield episode
- Episode no.: Season 1 Episode 1
- Directed by: Clark Johnson
- Written by: Shawn Ryan
- Production code: 5012-01-179
- Original air date: March 12, 2002

Episode chronology
← Previous —	Next → "Our Gang"

"Pilot" is the first episode of the FX crime drama television series The Shield. It was written by series creator Shawn Ryan, directed by Clark Johnson, and originally aired on March 12, 2002. The episode received Emmy Award nominations for both its writing and directing.

== Plot ==
The opening scene of the series consists of new LAPD Captain David Aceveda, of the infamous Farmington District, giving a press conference discussing how crime rates as a whole have been down for the past few months. This is juxtaposed with scenes of Vic Mackey, along with his Strike Team (Shane Vendrell, Curtis Lemansky, Ronnie Gardocki, and Terry Crowley), chasing a drug dealer through the district. When Mackey and his team corner the dealer, Mackey strips the dealer with various citizens watching. Doing this, Mackey finds the dealer's stash taped to his scrotum, and removes the baggie with excessive force.

Meanwhile, seasoned Detectives Dutch Wagenbach and Claudette Wyms discover a murdered woman in her home. It is revealed that her daughter is missing. Back at the Farmington Precinct (known by the detectives as "The Barn"), Aceveda calls Vic into his office. A Mexican gang member, Miguel Esteanas, who Vic had previously apprehended is filing a brutality complaint against Mackey, claiming he was harmed with a pair of pliers during his arrest. Aceveda reprimands Vic, saying that this is his fourth excessive force complaint since David was made Captain. Mackey feigns innocence to the pliers complaint. He later accosts Miguel, and terrorizes him into dropping the charges.

Later on, Vic and his partner Shane Vendrell pay a visit to notorious drug dealer Rondell Robinson. Unbeknownst to them, they are being watched by Terry. After this, Terry has a meeting with Aceveda and an associate from the U.S. Justice Department in a park. It is revealed here that Crowley has been gathering intel on Mackey and the Strike Team's doings for some time. When Terry tells Aceveda about the meeting with Robinson, Aceveda begins talking about building a federal case against Mackey. Crowley relents, only wishing to do so if he receives a job with the Justice Department, plus a new car and moving expenses. Aceveda agrees to the demands. When Terry asks David what he (Aceveda) is getting out of all of this, Aceveda replies "I just want a dirty cop off the streets." To this, Terry responds "You wanna be mayor someday? You better learn to lie a hell of a lot better than that."

Still on the hunt for the missing girl, Dutch and Claudette dig up info on her father, Lonnie, who has become a crackhead. After bringing him in, an interrogation reveals that the crackhead broke into his ex-wife Nancy's house, killed her, and kidnapped his daughter. The distraught father reveals that he sold his daughter to a pedophile named George Sawyer to feed his crack cocaine habit. After bringing in Sawyer, Dutch proceeds to manipulate him in the interrogation room; he's polite, brings him refreshments, and levels with him by claiming to have a desire for one of his daughter's thirteen-year-old friends (in reality, Dutch is childless). It is also during this sequence that an animosity between Dutch and Vic is revealed (Vic steals some Ding Dongs from Dutch's desk, which Dutch was planning to eat during what he expects to be a very long interrogation). The interrogation is successful, however, as Sawyer reveals that he didn't have the little girl in his possession, stating that she was "too young," and that he preferred them a little developed, like what Dutch was talking about. So he traded her to another pedophile, a Dr. Bernard Grady, for "a girl to be named later."

Dr. Grady is brought in, but denies any knowledge of the girl to Wyms and Dutch. Reluctantly, Aceveda brings Vic in as interrogator. Vic brings in a telephone book to the interrogation room. A smug Dr. Grady says to Vic, "Are we playing 'good cop, bad cop' now?" Vic then retorts and smiles, "Good cop and bad cop left for the day. I'm a different kind of cop." He then proceeds to beat Dr. Grady senseless with the phone book as the other cops look away nervously. Afterwards, Vic gives the girl's location to Aceveda.

At a cookout at Vic's home, Crowley approaches Vic about going along on an upcoming raid. Vic agrees. The Strike Team prepare for the raid, on a dealer (and rival of Rondell's) nicknamed Two Time, at his apartment near Dodger Stadium. Two Time is caught unaware, with Vic, Shane, and Terry confronting Two Time directly, and Lem and Ronnie covering the other exit. Two Time becomes trapped in his bathroom where he fires several shots at the Strike Team. Vic and Shane return fire, killing him. Vic lifts Two Time's gun out of his hand, looks Terry right in the eyes, and shoots him in the face. As Terry Crowley lies dying, Vic Mackey stands over him, shaking his head with a smirk.

== Cast ==
- Michael Chiklis as Detective Vic Mackey
- Walton Goggins as Detective Shane Vendrell
- David Rees Snell as Detective Ronnie Gardocki
- Kenny Johnson as Detective Curtis "Lem" Lemansky
- Reed Diamond as Detective Terry Crowley
- Benito Martinez as Captain David Aceveda
- Jay Karnes as Detective Holland "Dutch" Wagenbach
- CCH Pounder as Detective Claudette Wyms
- Michael Jace as Officer Julien Lowe
- Catherine Dent as Officer Danielle "Danny" Sofer

== Production ==
FX ordered the pilot in March 2001; the episode was filmed in June, and FX issued a series order on August 30, one day before the deadline.

== Awards ==
- Primetime Emmy Awards: For the 54th Primetime Emmy Awards, Michael Chiklis submitted this episode for consideration in the category of Outstanding Lead Actor for a Drama Series, was nominated and was the winner. Also nominated for this episode were: Shawn Ryan in the category for Outstanding Writing for a Drama Series and Clark Johnson in the category for Outstanding Directing for a Drama Series.

== Music ==
- The song played at the end of the episode is "Bawitdaba" by Kid Rock. Series creator Shawn Ryan stated in the audio commentary that he constantly listened to the song while writing the episode.
