= Jon Kavanaugh =

- The Shield character
- First appearance: "Extraction" (episode 5.01)
- Last appearance: "Baptism by Fire" (episode 6.02)
- Created by: Shawn Ryan
- Portrayed by: Forest Whitaker

In-universe information
- Gender: Male
- Title: former Lieutenant
- Occupation: former police officer, internal affairs
- Spouse: Sadie Kavanaugh (ex-wife)

Lieutenant Jon Kavanaugh is a fictional Internal Affairs Lieutenant in the Los Angeles Police Department on the FX television show The Shield. He was portrayed by Forest Whitaker. He is introduced at the beginning of series five and serves as the primary antagonist to Vic Mackey. He has been described as an anti-villain. Both the character, and Whitaker's performance have been well-received.

== Concept and creation ==
Shawn Ryan conceived the idea of a "pretty virtuous Internal Affairs detective," who would become "hell-bent on bringing [Mackey] to justice." While writing the series five script, Ryan was convinced that he was "making it tough for the audience. They're not going to be sure who to root for." Then he discovered the audience overwhelmingly supported Vic; "our audience viewed Vic as the hero. They wanted Vic to get away with it. They found every negative thing to say about Whitaker's character they could think of."

== Role in The Shield ==
=== Character summary ===
Kavanagh first appears in the first episode of series five, "Extraction." Kavanaugh is depicted as an Internal Affairs Department (IAD) Lieutenant ruthlessly determined to take down Detective Vic Mackey and his Strike Team. Kavanaugh's investigation ultimately changes into a personal vendetta which destroys his career.

Before being promoted to Lieutenant, Kavanaugh took a spot in IAD after breaking the blue code of silence on his former partner. He has degrees in both criminology and psychology, and frequently plays mind games with people under surveillance to find out whether they'll "crack under pressure".

Kavanaugh was once married to a woman named Sadie (Gina Torres), but the two were divorced as a result of her severe mental illness and his unwillingness to continue taking care of her. Despite this, he continued to wear his wedding ring and, for a long time, remained in love with her.

Kavanagh's investigation of Mackey and The Strike team forms the basis of series five, with Kavanagh serving as the primary antagonist.

==== Season 5 ====
Kavanaugh begins his investigation by targeting Mackey's ex-wife, Corrine. Under pressure from Kavanaugh, who threatens to arrest her if she doesn't cooperate, she begins assisting the investigation.

Also pressured by Kavanaugh, Lem, who was caught not turning in heroin after a bust, reluctantly agrees to wear a wire to uncover evidence on Vic. Through this, Kavanaugh discovers a plot to traffic pharmaceutical drugs to the Russian Mafia and take money under the table. When it appears the deal has gone through and that Vic has murdered for Russian mobsters, Kavanaugh's task force swoops in and handcuffs the team, only to discover they have unwittingly destroyed a top secret sting operation. Kavanaugh also learns that his bugging of the Strike Team's "clubhouse" was used to feed him false information. Mackey had knowingly tricked Kavanagh into ruining the sting to paint the latter in a negative light to their superiors. Once alone, Kavanagh explodes in a fit of rage.

Kavanaugh then tries to guilt Vic into confessing by forcing him to revisit the Season 1 murder scene and describe what happened there to Detective Terry Crowley's weeping brother who, obviously, doesn't believe him. Vic is unfazed, however, and calmly sticks to his original story, however he is somewhat shaken when the brother tells him that God will avenge his brother. Desperate, Kavanaugh approaches imprisoned drug lord and cop killer Antwon Mitchell, whom Mackey incarcerated at the conclusion of series four. Antwon offers Kavanaugh more than enough information to destroy the Strike Team, but only if Vic, Lem, Ronnie, and Shane are sent to "his" prison so he can murder them. Disgusted, Kavanaugh refuses his offer.

Kavanaugh then widens the investigation to include Councilman David Aceveda for alleged collusion with Mackey and The Strike Team. During a raid on a Salvadoran hand grenade factory, Lem heroically saves Kavanaugh from an active grenade tossed in his direction by throwing it away seconds before it explodes. Kavanaugh responds by continuing to vainly pressure Lem into testifying against Vic Mackey. Later, Vic angrily confronts Kavanaugh about his treatment of Lem.

However, the raid had come shortly before Kavanaugh's meeting with his ex-wife, Sadie. Vic and Lem enter the security monitor room after noticing the Lieutenant's obvious distress, and watch the ensuing conversation between Kavanaugh and his distraught, mentally ill ex-wife. Viewing their disturbing confrontation via closed-circuit television, Vic remarks that they have found Kavanaugh's weakness. Kavanaugh eventually notices that the security camera in the room is turned on. Realizing his conversation with his wife is being observed by his enemies leads him to rush out of the interrogation room in a rage. Vic simply looks him in the eyes and smiles smugly. The now outraged Kavanaugh decides to leave Lem with no choice other than to testify against Vic. He orders Detective Lemansky to be arrested for possession of heroin with intent to distribute. As Vic and his fellow officers watch in horror, Lem is handcuffed by Julien Lowe, on Kavanaugh's orders, placed in lockup with civilian criminals, processed, and sent to a detention center. That same evening, Kavanaugh visits Antwon and accepts his deal.

Shortly thereafter, Vic visits Sadie's residence. Originally intending to milk her for information, he changes his plans after Sadie sexually propositions him and has sex with her. Vic later taunts Kavanagh over this. Horrified, Kavanaugh rushes to his ex-wife's house and demands to know whether it is true, only to have Sadie respond that it was. Enraged, Kavanaugh tries to take vengeance by seducing Vic's ex-wife Corrine. However, she rejects him, disgusted by his treatment of her in the past. Kavanaugh then tries to rape her, but cannot bring himself to go through with it.

Despite all of his manoeuvering, Kavanaugh's investigation is destroyed by external factors. In a move to seal the other three members of the Strike Team off from prosecution, Lem pleads guilty to theft under color of authority, agreeing to serve 18 months before parole of a 5-year sentence. The Department brass and the District Attorney, annoyed with the expense of paying for Kavanaugh's task force and the lack of progress in the case, decide to accept. In a desperate attempt to change the Chief's mind, Kavanaugh inadvertently reveals that Sadie has slept with Vic and that destroying Vic has become more important than his job. Chief Johnson, who rebuffs him, informing Kavanagh he has 48 hours to tie up the loose ends.

However, Lem does not report for processing, and Kavanaugh is overjoyed to be given one final chance to crush his nemesis. Correctly presuming that Vic is harbouring Lem, he attempts to have the Strike Team arrested for aiding and abetting a fugitive. He has the Team followed at all times and even persuades Aceveda to leak false information to Vic, saying Lem has revealed the Strike Team's involvement in the Armenian Money Train robbery.

Kavanaugh also has the Team trailed when they are to meet Lem, but is unable to follow all three of them. His tails are easily shaken, but Kavanaugh soon receives a phone call advising that Lem has been blown apart by a hand grenade. When the body is discovered, Kavanaugh and Mackey come face to face once more. Kavanaugh is certain that Vic has again murdered a fellow officer and believes that all his hatred of his nemesis is completely justified. Vic, however, is completely devastated by a murder he had nothing to do with. After Kavanagh coldly asks if he is happy over Lem's death, Vic tackles Kavanaugh with a scream of outraged fury. The two enemies brawl across the crime scene, until their fellow cops pull them apart. Kavanaugh glares balefully as he watches Mackey walk away.

==== Season 6 ====
With Lem now dead and his career and reputation soiled, Kavanaugh is ordered to leave the Barn and allow the investigation of Lem's murder to proceed. Kavanaugh pleads for time to look into Vic's possible involvement. Assistant Chief Phillips grudgingly grants him 24 hours to write a report for consideration. However, Kavanagh again accuses Vic of murder and ignites another brawl. The fight is broken up, but is witnessed by Phillips and Captain Wyms. Kavanaugh is ordered to leave the Barn immediately, his investigation apparently over.

Nothing now matters to Kavanaugh except destroying Mackey. Changing tactics, Kavanaugh informs Claudette and Chief Phillips that Vic had hired Salvadoran drug dealers to murder Lem, using Emolia Melendez as a go-between. This grants him a temporary reprieve. After Emolia agrees to follow the story in exchange for witness protection, she testifies to Claudette and Phillips about the false details of Vic's involvement. Kavanaugh is authorized to investigate Vic's involvement and begins by ordering officers to await Vic at his home to take him in for questioning.

Kavanaugh soon senses that not everyone believes his story. After hearing Emolia's testimony, Dutch expresses skepticism about her story and requests further corroborating evidence. He later suggests that the "evidence" found in Vic's house is simply too good to be true. In an attempt to protect his case, Kavanaugh requests that Dutch be removed from the investigation, citing that Dutch's past relationship with Vic's ex-wife may have resulted in a conflict of interest.

Then, however, Corrine Mackey learns of the charges against her ex-husband and angrily confronts Kavanaugh, formally accusing him of sexual assault. When Claudette asks Dutch for his opinion, he expresses skepticism about Corrine's allegations, suggesting the rape attempt only happened in her own mind. He further voices his growing doubts about Kavanaugh's case, questioning whether Vic would murder a close friend under any circumstances.

Claudette tears into Emolia in the interrogation room, saying she should feel ashamed of letting herself become a pawn in the war between Vic and Kavanaugh. Meanwhile, Kavanaugh realizes what he has become. He stops Claudette and confesses to planting the evidence, saying "I framed a guilty man," laughing at the irony of it all.

Kavanaugh is immediately stripped of his badge and imprisoned for his many crimes. He later pleads guilty in exchange for a lesser sentence.

Taking a break from his mission to wreak bloody revenge on Lem's killer, Vic pays Kavanaugh a visit in prison. Although Vic taunts him about having lost both his moral compass and their private war, Kavanaugh remains unfazed. He responds that he is now at peace and finally free of Vic's corrupting influence.

=== Personality ===
He is depicted as a cunning and intelligent man. For example, he uses psychology to determine the strength of someone's character. In the words of The Denver Post; "He has a way of genially offering a piece of chewing gum, forcefully and repeatedly, as a way to test whether a subject will cave under pressure. Most people politely decline at first, then eventually acquiesce." PopMatters describe him as "an especially shady sort [..] Cunning and creepy at the same time." Rob Owen for the Pittsburgh Post-Gazette writes of Kavanagh; "Kavanaugh is an odd duck, perpetually offering people a stick of gum with the promise that, "It's a fresh pack." I've watched the first four episodes, and I still can't figure out if Kavanaugh repeatedly underestimates Mackey or if he's pulling a Columbo, acting overly cheerful and slightly out of it to put his prey at ease before pouncing. People magazine comment "Whitaker’s Kavanaugh is a man of both soft-spoken sloth and slightly unsettling mystery."

== Reception ==
Kavanagh has been summarised as "an Internal Affairs Department lieutenant whose sole purpose is [...] to take down Vic Mackey." Forest Whitaker's portrayal of Kavanagh has been widely praised as one of the finer performances on The Shield. The Denver Post describe Whitaker as "a worthy adversary for Chiklis." Adding "Whitaker invests his tough, driven character with a smiling, easygoing manner antithetical to Mackey’s." Dawnie Walton for Entertainment Weekly writes that the addition of Whitaker to the cast "figured out a way to make up for the loss of Glenn Close and Anthony Anderson. Eric Goldman for IGN adds "Forrest [sic] Whitaker is phenomenal as Kavanaugh and I certainly hope there's an Emmy with his name on it this fall. He's a wonderful mirror to Mackey, showing extreme moments of creepiness and moments of sweetness, while slowly unraveling as he finds his attempts to bust Mackey continually fall apart." Dan Iverson, also for IGN shares similar sentiments, writing "With an intense acting style Whitaker in particular brought even more passion and intensity to The Shield than normal. In a role which will be long remembered, Forest took a normal I.A. detective and turned him into a formidable opponent for Mackey. The beauty of their dichotomy was that Mackey was the anti-hero and Kavanaugh was the anti-villain - making us feel opposite feelings for these characters than we should. Mackey is a bad guy and Kavanaugh is somebody who can take him down, yet through Mackey's belief in his method of business and Kavanaugh's obsessive method for taking him down, we viewed these characters in a different light than we should. This is only one of the many ways in which Shawn Ryan and the rest of The Shield team have worked together to bring us a deeper experience than most other TV." PopMatters describe Whitaker's performance as "incredible." Melanie McFarland, writing for the Seattle Post-Intelligencer adds "Whitaker plays Kavanaugh with such unctuous shadiness that you can't quite bring yourself to cheer for him, either. The actor takes the smallest actions in creator Shawn Ryan's script, such as offering someone a stick of gum, and transforms them into jagged, defining moments. And his facial expressions make your skin crawl." The Los Angeles Times add "Whitaker’s theatricality was initially jarring next to the ensemble’s more naturalistic performances, but Kavanaugh grew more intriguing with every episode and the complexity of the actor’s work deepened. The darker and more unpredictable Kavanaugh’s behavior became, the closer he seemed to capturing his prey. But that was not to be. As Kavanaugh told Mackey in the episode’s final scene: “The truth is, it isn’t your time yet.” Empire magazine describe Whitaker's performance as "superb", regretting his lack of appearances in series six.
