= Family Meeting =

- The Shield episodes
- Episode nos.: Season 7 Episodes 13/14
- Directed by: Clark Johnson
- Written by: Shawn Ryan
- Production code: 5012-07-713
- Original air date: November 25, 2008

Episode chronology
| ← Previous "Possible Kill Screen" | Next → — |

"Family Meeting" is the 13th (and in subsequent broadcasts, the 14th, as it was split in a two-part episode because of its length following the original broadcast) and final episode of the seventh season and the series finale of The Shield. The episode aired on FX on November 25, 2008, and was written by Shawn Ryan and directed by Clark Johnson. The title comes from a line Shane Vendrell (Walton Goggins) calls to his family during the episode.

== Plot summary ==
The episode starts with Vic Mackey meeting Ronnie Gardocki and telling him that Shane didn't show up at the drop off, and that Vic's wife Corinne was arrested. Vic also tells Ronnie (falsely) that ICE Agent Olivia Murray agreed to clear himself, Ronnie, and Corinne once they arrest Beltran. Vic and Ronnie meet with Beltran, who reluctantly agrees to meet with the black board of directors at the exchange. Meanwhile, Dutch Wagenbach tells Corinne about the deal Vic made for full immunity, which causes her to panic. Dutch assures her that they have an idea for keeping her safe from Vic if he finds out what she did to him. At Mara's request, Shane takes Mara and Jackson back to their home, and they plan to leave the next day when the police are busy guarding the president.

Back at the Barn, Claudette Wyms convinces Olivia to put Vic's family in federal witness protection to keep Vic away from them. Olivia says that should be the police department's responsibility, but is persuaded when Claudette tells her it's a favor for her and not Vic, and that it would be a good way to punish him.

Vic goes to Corinne's house to tell her she is safe. Corinne and the kids start to leave immediately after Vic leaves. Shane shows up to surprise Steve Billings and asks him to deliver a message: Mara shot the woman in self-defense. Shane also says he is willing to turn himself in and testify against Vic and Ronnie, if the police can guarantee immunity for Mara. Shane gives Steve an attorney's card and tells him to contact the attorney.

At the exchange, Beltran doesn't show up and sends his men instead. This angers the black board of directors, as do the sample quantities of drugs and Beltran's representative's revelation that Beltran had been paid $100,000 (half the amount Vic had collected from the black board of directors). The deal is about to go sour, so ICE moves in and arrests everyone. Olivia tells Vic that he is no longer involved and orders him to back off the Beltran case. Vic decides to go after Beltran nonetheless, to honor his deal, and Ronnie backs him up believing he has the same deal.

Lloyd Denton shows up at the Barn to report his mother Rita missing, and Dutch believes Lloyd killed her. Lloyd says he last saw her the night before, and that she was upset about a fight she had had with Dutch. He claims she left at 3 a.m. to go to Dutch's house.

Dutch tells Claudette about the mysterious hang-up calls he got from Rita that made him go to her house the morning before. They believe Lloyd killed his mother and made those calls to implicate Dutch.

Julien and Tina respond to a noise complaint about a rally for Robert Huggins, a local man running for mayor whom they end up arresting for disturbing the peace. Shane calls the attorney and finds out that Claudette is only willing to offer reduced charges for Mara. He then calls Vic for help. Vic refuses to help and tells Shane about the deal he cut with ICE. Shane responds by telling Vic that Corinne was working with the police against Vic, because she didn't want Vic near their children and wanted him out of their lives. He tells Vic that no matter what happens to him and Mara and his kids, they would always be a family, while Vic will have nothing. A skeptical Vic tells Shane that he'll check up on Shane's children when Shane and Mara are in prison and tell them all about what they did, and hangs up. Shane gets furious, and distraught over the fact that nothing can save him and his family now. Olivia informs Vic that Corinne requested protection from him and that he would no longer be able to see his children.

Back at the Barn, Claudette pulls Dutch off of the Denton case after uniformed officers find burnt women's clothing in a trash container at Dutch's house. Robert Huggins makes bail and requests police protection since threats were made against him, but the request is ignored. Billings' attorney meets with Dutch and asks him to change his statement because it hurts Billings' case against the department.

Shane buys a rose and a toy truck for Mara and Jackson. Vic and Ronnie get Santiago to divulge Beltran's location. Vic suspected Santiago would know where it is, since the Biz Lats probably delivered the drugs rather than Beltran. Vic then calls Olivia to tell her the location, but she refuses to help him.

Huggins interrupts a rally for Aceveda and questions him as a mayoral candidate. Back at the Barn, Billings is unable to get Lloyd to say anything self-incriminating, and all the evidence points to Dutch. Dutch feels guilty for what he believes happened to Rita and asks Claudette for another shot at Lloyd. Claudette refuses and decides to interrogate Lloyd herself. She tells him she's convinced that Dutch may have had something to do with Rita's disappearance.

Back at the rally, Huggins continues to insult Aceveda until Aceveda orders the police escort Huggins out of the building. Billings' attorney convinces Dutch to change his statement to keep Billings safe from the Department's countersuit.

Shane goes back home and runs into a neighbor. He gives the presents he bought to his family. The neighbor calls the police, who go to Shane's house. As soon as they enter, Shane kills himself with a revolver. The police also find Mara and Jackson lying dead on the bed.

Vic calls Aceveda and asks him for help arresting Beltran. Aceveda initially refuses, but agrees after realizing it would be a good PR move for him that could garner more votes.

Vic and Ronnie head to Beltran's hideout and wait for ICE, believing Aceveda will convince them to show up. However, when they feel Beltran is about to leave, they move in alone. As they secure Beltran and his men, the ICE agents arrive. The drugs are found, and Beltran is arrested.

Back at the Barn, Billings thanks Dutch for changing his statement and informs him that he got a good settlement. Dutch later learns from Billings' attorney that all Billings received was back pay for two days of missed work. She gives Dutch her card and tells him to call her some time.

At the warehouse, Aceveda arrives to talk with the press about the drug bust. Olivia tells Ronnie Captain Wyms wants to see him at the Barn (where Vic knows Ronnie will be arrested).

At the Barn, Claudette tells Lloyd that she knows he's a murderer and that he's now a suspect in his mother's disappearance. She also reveals to Dutch that she's dying.

Tina and Julien respond to a call and find that Huggins has been shot. He dies in the ambulance on the way to the hospital.

Vic shows up at the Barn to scornful looks from the others. Ronnie informs him about Shane's murder-suicide before Claudette pulls Vic away to the interrogation room. She reads Shane's incomplete suicide note to Vic and shows him pictures of Shane and his family's corpses. Vic ruminates before destroying the room's surveillance camera. Simultaneously, Claudette signals to arrest Ronnie, in front of Vic. Shocked, Ronnie berates Vic for his betrayal in front of everyone. Afterwards, Vic exits the Barn in disgrace.

The next morning, Vic reports to his new job at ICE. He asks Olivia where his family is, but she refuses to tell him. She then breaks the news that he won't be working the streets for ICE. Rather, his job for the next three years is to produce daily reports about gang-related activity, and will involve no active investigation on his part; crime data will be provided to him, and he will be required to write reports about what the crimes reveal about gangland politics. Vic objects, but Olivia warns him he will be prosecuted for all his confessed crimes if he does not comply. Likewise, he'll be prosecuted if he breaches any of the restrictive terms of his employment: notably, Vic must wear a suit and tie, is not allowed to possess any type of weapon within the facility (even his own), and is not to have any direct role in police work, and must submit five typed, 10-page, single-spaced reports per week. Despite the job at ICE being just for three years, Olivia makes it abundantly clear to Vic that she will make every single day of them unpleasant as possible for him.

At the Barn, Aceveda tells Claudette there is no truth to rumors that he was involved with Huggins' death. Claudette does not believe it either, but could not ignore a death threat towards Aceveda. He asks her how she's holding up and tells her they both spent a lot of time in the Captain's office trying to put Vic away. She congratulates Aceveda in advance, for becoming mayor, as footage of the president's visit is played on the television in the background.

Vic returns to ICE and, visibly angry and miserable, is given a tour of his new work environment and a rundown on its rules. A federal agent shows Corinne and her children their new home, and describes the neighborhood (which can be deduced to be Rockford, Illinois, since they have the skeleton of Jane the dinosaur at Burpee Museum of Natural History). He tells them that the home is pretty basic, but Corinne thinks it's fine.

Back at the Barn, the Unis have a small celebration for Tina's one-year anniversary, which is soon interrupted by a robbery call on which officers need assistance. Over at ICE, Vic, still visibly angry and now all alone on the floor, places pictures of his children on his desk and one of the entire Strike Team, folded to only show himself and Lem, with no pictures of Ronnie and Shane in sight. He smiles when he looks at the picture of Lem. He hears sirens and looks outside the window, where he sees some patrol cars running by. He returns to his desk and sits quietly for a while looking increasingly emotional. Finally, the lights go out, he takes his gun out of a lock box, and smiles. He then puts on his jacket and leaves; his destination unknown.

The episode ends with a montage of significant characters and events from the show.

== Production notes ==
- This is the only episode for which Shawn Ryan was not present during filming. The 2007–2008 Writers Guild of America strike had just begun and as a guild member, Ryan was obliged to take part in the strike.
- Shane Vendrell's murder-suicide was not in the first draft script, but after Ryan had heard news of the similar murder-suicide of wrestler Chris Benoit and his family, he wrote it in.
- Episode director Clark Johnson appears briefly as the federal agent who introduces Corinne and her children to their new home.
- The series finale featured an 80-minute run time as a two-hour series finale. Subsequent airings of this episode are split into two parts, with the first part labelled season 7, episode 13, "Family Meeting, Part I", and the second part was labelled season 7, episode 14, "Family Meeting, Part II".

== Reception ==
The final episode and the final season as a whole received overwhelming praise from many notable critics, with many praising its sense of closure. The episode is often considered one of the best series finales in TV history. Maureen Ryan of the Chicago Tribune said of the finale:

Thanks to its insanely talented cast and a terrific script by creator Shawn Ryan, longtime "Shield" fans may find themselves fighting back tears more than once; and finally, this is the most brilliant series finale I’ve ever seen. I will miss this show.

John Kubikek of BuddyTV wrote that the episode "delivered everything fans could've hoped for", remarking that it didn't end in an unsatisfying manner like The Sopranos finale. Writing for The A.V. Club, Steven Hyden gave the episode an "A" rating; he praised the ultimate fate of Vic Mackey, calling it "a stone cold masterstroke: predictable only in retrospect, darkly comic, and the only possible fate for a man too clever to get caught and too damned to ever escape his demons", likening him to a castrated bull suffering a fate worse than death.

In 2011, the finale was ranked #20 on the TV Guide Network special, TV's Most Unforgettable Finales. Noted television critic Alan Sepinwall ranked the finale #1 on his list of best series finales, in TV (The Book): Two Experts Pick the Greatest American Shows of All Time. In an entry for the show, Sepinwall opined that without the finale the series would still be great, but the final episode made it "one for the ages".

== Music ==
The song played during the montage at the end of the episode is "Long Time Ago" by Concrete Blonde.
