= Vic Mackey =

Fictional character in the television show The Shield

- The Shield character
- Vic Mackey portrayed by Michael Chiklis
- First appearance: "Pilot" (2002)
- Last appearance: "Family Meeting" (2008)
- Created by: Shawn Ryan
- Portrayed by: Michael Chiklis

In-universe information
- Full name: Victor Samuel Mackey
- Gender: Male
- Title: Analyst
- Occupation: Detective (Season 1 - Season 7); ICE Analyst (Season 7)
- Spouse: Corinne Mackey (ex-wife)
- Children: Cassidy Mackey (daughter); Matthew Mackey (son); Megan Mackey (daughter); Lee Sofer (son)

Victor Samuel Mackey, is a fictional character and the protagonist of The Shield, an American crime drama series, which ran for seven seasons on FX. Played by Michael Chiklis, Mackey is portrayed as a corrupt and brutal detective in the Los Angeles Police Department. He leads a small anti-gang unit primarily tasked with curbing the rampant drug trade in the fictional Farmington district of Los Angeles. He commits several crimes throughout the series including drug dealing, extortion, police brutality, and murder. He is often depicted justifying his crimes as a means to an end. Despite his actions, Mackey considers himself a devoted father and family man.

== Concept, creation and casting ==
As part of his research for The Shield, Shawn Ryan, the creator, rode with police officers in San Francisco. Ryan always returned with what the Los Angeles Times describe as "dark, twisted tales". These experiences, combined with the then-recent Rampart scandal, became the impetus for Vic Mackey. Ryan has said "The interesting question to me was: 'What do we allow our officers to do to make us safer? How many rights of criminals are we willing to give up to ensure our safety?'"

Shawn Ryan outlined his initial conception of Vic Mackey and how it ultimately evolved into the character portrayed on the show. He states "I had not envisioned Vic Mackey looking like [Michael Chiklis]. I'm sort of a big guy with a bald head and people always asked if I intentionally cast someone who looked like me, and absolutely not. I always described it as a young Harrison Ford role and Michael came in and made me reimagine it. He was this bulldog with this intensity and energy that matched. He saw and read the character differently and better than anyone who came in before or after him... In his audition for us, he was on his feet and pacing around like a caged tiger. Even then, as great as the performance was, I still kind of nervous... I still had some butterflies. It wasn't until we got in front of the cameras, where I was like, 'I really do think the world will see what I did.'" Ryan said the writers always thought of Mackey as being like a shark, someone who, in order to survive, has to keep moving forward.

Ryan has said FX initially "wanted Eric Stoltz to play Vic Mackey" and that they made him an offer which he "almost took."

Actor Michael Chiklis had not been associated with brutish characters like Vic Mackey before his work on The Shield. He was best known at the time for portraying the balding, friendly and slightly overweight Tony Scali in The Commish (1991–96), and similar roles prior. After playing Curly Howard in the TV movie The Three Stooges (2000), Chiklis decided to reinvent his image. He underwent an intense workout regime and shaved his head, completely transforming his appearance. His casting as Mackey was seen as unusual at the time given his previous roles. Kevin Reilly, FX's then-president of entertainment, was quoted saying “I knew [Chiklis] as a soft, cuddly guy physically and emotionally. He came in with this shaved head and his biceps, and he just chewed through the scene. He blew us away."

== Role in The Shield ==
=== Character summary ===
Mackey's surname is of Irish or Scottish origin, and he is occasionally seen in a shamrock T-shirt. He also mentions that his father was a bricklayer. In the show's fifth season, he tells Lt. Jon Kavanaugh that he has been a police officer for fourteen years. In a DVD commentary for season four, Chiklis mentions that the strike team members are from the same areas as the actors who portray them, implying that Mackey is a native of the Boston, Massachusetts area.

Mackey works for the Los Angeles Police Department in the fictional Farmington district of Los Angeles, an area plagued with gang-related violence, drugs, and prostitution. He leads the 'Strike Team,' an experimental anti-gang unit. The Shield and the Strike Team were inspired by the Rampart Division Community Resources Against Street Hoodlums (CRASH) unit within the Los Angeles Police Department. The team initially consists of four members, Shane Vendrell, Curtis Lemansky, and Ronnie Gardocki, led by Vic. They are all close friends, although this friendship is tested multiple times throughout the series. Mackey and the Strike Team use criminal methods to coerce information and stage arrests and take a share of various drug busts. Wired highlight the loyalty of the Strike Team to Vic, "no matter how far he crosses the line."

At the start of the series, Vic is happily married to his wife, Corrine, and they have three children, Matthew, Megan and Cassidy. Both Matthew and Megan are diagnosed with autism. The high costs incurred as a result of their tuition fees often form the justification for some of Vic's corruption. Vic struggles at times to keep his work and family separate, ultimately leading to the collapse of his marriage at the end of the first season. Though he had cheated on his wife, he was devastated when she left him.

Vic's attempts to stay one step ahead of not only his superior, David Aceveda (who is fully aware of Vic's criminality), but of IAD, various drug lords, gangsters and other criminals, all while trying to be a caring father and family man, are prominent plot devices throughout the series.

==== Murdering Terry Crowley ====
In the pilot episode, Vic murders the fifth and newest member of his team, Detective Terry Crowley. Crowley had been sent by Captain David Aceveda and the Justice Department to build a Federal case against the Strike Team for colluding with drug lord Rondell Robinson. Vic is secretly warned of this by his friend, Assistant Chief Ben Gilroy. Vic and Shane both agree to murder Crowley for his betrayal and to ensure their freedom. During a raid on the house of drug dealer "Two Time," Vic kills Two Time, but then picks up Two Time's gun and shoots Crowley in the face. Vic and Shane then rig the crime scene evidence, claiming that Two Time stepped out of the bathroom, shot Terry, and was slain by their return fire. This sets in motion events that loom over the Strike Team throughout the series. Shane expresses remorse and guilt in the aftermath of the murder, but Vic remains stoic, though he would later express his own feelings of regret about it. Aceveda is convinced of Mackey's guilt in the murder, but is unable to prove it.

==== Robbing the Armenian Mob ====
At the conclusion of the second season, Mackey and the Strike Team rob the 'Armenian money train' - a train transporting the bi-yearly illegal profits of the Armenian mob out of Los Angeles. Mackey justifies this crime by stating the money is better off in the Strike Team's pockets, to be spent on their families, than in the hands of the Armenians. Lemansky is the only member of the team to show reluctance at partaking in the robbery, but does so anyway. Like the Crowley murder, the fallout from the money train robbery lingers over the team throughout the series.

During season three, the Armenian mob send a feared hitman, Margos Dezerian, to Los Angeles to retrieve the money train cash. Margos' search begins to point towards Vic and the Strike Team, despite the team framing a low-level hoodlum (who is murdered by Margos) to draw away suspicion. To protect himself and the team, Vic lures Margos to a house and murders him, rigging the crime scene to make it look like self-defence.

==== Disbandment and reformation of the Strike Team ====
At the end of season three, with Aceveda and the Armenian mob seemingly closing in on them, Lemansky burns the money train cash to ensure their freedom. This causes deep resentment between Lemansky and the rest of the team, particularly Shane. Lem offers to transfer off the Strike Team, but with news that the team will be disbanded if that happens, Vic makes attempts to reconcile with Lem. Shane, however, proves intransigent, and is unable to make peace, leading to the disbandment of the Strike Team.

Season four begins with Vic working solely with Gardocki, both now relegated largely to desk work since the team's disbandment. Shane has moved on to vice, whereas Lem now handles juvenile crime. Their friendships with both Vic and each other have become estranged. Shane becomes deeply involved with a drug lord named Antwon Mitchell, becoming too deep when Mitchell attempts to frame Shane for murder. Shane pleads to Vic for help and Vic comes to the aid of his former best friend, joined by Ronnie, and eventually by Lemansky too. After taking down Mitchell, the camaraderie shown during the ordeal sees their strong friendship rekindle and the Strike Team is reformed.

==== Internal affairs investigation and Lemansky's death ====
In season five, Lieutenant Jon Kavanaugh of internal affairs attempts to send Vic to prison for Terry's murder. Vic and Shane, however, calmly stick to their original story and Kavanaugh's crusade ultimately changes into a personal vendetta which destroys his career. Nonetheless, throughout the course of these events Curtis Lemansky is arrested by Kavanagh on charges relating to some stolen heroin found in Lemansky's car, which Lemansky failed to report as evidence. A sinister plot between Kavanagh and Acevada has Shane wrongly fearing that Lemansky will betray the team to cut a better deal. Shane kills Lemansky to protect his own freedom. This sets in motion the downfall of the Strike Team and its members. Around the same time, Vic learns he is being forced into early retirement after he reaches his 15 year milestone, a short time away.

==== Downfall ====
Seasons six and seven portrays the downfall of Mackey and the Strike Team. Vic learns of Shane's murder of Lemansky (though not before torturing and murdering the primary suspect, Guardo Lima) and cannot forgive him for it. He subsequently becomes a lot closer to Gardocki, now his sole friend. With no chance of repairing their friendship, Vic, Ronnie and Shane each orchestrate assassination attempts against one another. The attempts fail, though Shane's assassination attempt on Ronnie is exposed, setting off a series of events ultimately leading to Shane's suicide.

During the chaos, Vic's appeal against his forced retirement fails, and, with ten days remaining on the job, chooses to resign, knowing Captain Wyms will restrict him to desk work if he remains. The Strike Team, which Ronnie has been the de jure leader of since the news of Vic's impending retirement, is disbanded once again.

In the meantime, Vic's ex-wife Corrine has since become fearful of him. She was especially disturbed by news from Mara, Shane's wife, that Vic tried to kill her and Shane, despite Mara's pregnancy. Corrine wants Vic out of her and her children's lives. She has since been working with the police to put Vic in jail. The police begin to suspect Vic is becoming wise to Corrine's cooperation with them, so to maintain her cover, Corrine is mock-arrested in front of Vic. Vic now believes Corrine is in serious trouble with the law, and resolves to help her, unaware of her betrayal of him.

In exchange for helping ICE develop a Federal case against Beltran, a drug lord, Vic arranges for full immunity for himself and for Corrine. He is unable to secure the same deal for Ronnie and decides to leave him out. The immunity agreement also provides Mackey three years' employment with ICE, which he assumes will involve work as a field agent. Mackey admits to all the crimes he has committed including the slayings of Terry Crowley, Margos Dezerian, Guardo Lima, and many others, and receives full immunity from prosecution for all of them. After he details all of his crimes, a horrified ICE Agent Olivia Murray tells Vic that he has "implicated Gardocki in enough shit to put him away for the rest of his life." Vic responds that he needs Ronnie's help to bust Beltran and that he would, "string him along," until then.

In the aftermath of Beltran's arrest, Captain Wyms summons Vic and Ronnie back to their former precinct. She then brings Vic into the interrogation room and reads Shane's suicide letter aloud, while showing him photographs of his body. Although Vic and Shane's relationship was shattered by this point, Vic is nonetheless devastated. He restrains himself from reacting emotionally when he notices the surveillance camera that Wyms is watching him on. He then tears the camera off the wall and smashes it on the floor.

Vic then watches in horror as Ronnie Gardocki, his last remaining friend, is placed under arrest. Gardocki is informed that Vic took the deal with ICE and confessed to everything the Strike Team did as part of his immunity deal, leaving Ronnie to take the fall for all of it and be sent to prison. Enraged and devastated that Vic lied to him and sold him out, Ronnie screams profanity at Vic as the former is handcuffed and led away. Vic explains that he thought Corrine was in trouble and did not think he had a choice. As his former colleagues eye him with frigid loathing, Wyms dismisses Vic. Vic leaves the precinct for the last time in disgrace.

==== Epilogue ====
Frightened by what actions Vic may take for her attempts to send him to prison, Vic's ex-wife Corinne pleads with Wyms for protection from him. In response, they approach ICE Agent Olivia Murray and advise her that taking Vic's children away was the best means of hurting him. Corinne and the children disappear into the Witness Protection Program.

In the aftermath, Vic begs for the opportunity to say goodbye to his children. Unmoved, Agent Murray responds, "You said goodbye to them the moment you shot another cop in the face."

Realizing that the deal includes no stipulations about the capacity in which ICE must employ Vic, Murray vows to make his three years at the agency as unpleasant as possible by severely curtailing his duties. Vic is assigned to a desk job, forbidden to carry a weapon while on duty, and required to write a 10-page duty report every day and submit to weekly drug testing. She makes it clear to Vic that even the smallest violation of these condition will result in his immunity being revoked and certain prison time. Sitting in a cubicle and isolated from his family and former colleagues, Vic decorates his desk with pictures of his children, and a photo of himself drinking beer with Lemansky. He does not add any pictures of Shane, Ronnie, or Corinne.

Hearing police sirens one night while doing paperwork, Mackey looks out the office window. Returning to his desk, Vic's eyes fill with tears as he stares at the photographs of his children. He becomes visibly angry, retrieves his weapon, holsters it under his shirt, and walks off into the night.

=== Relationships ===
==== Relationship with Shane ====
Mackey's relationship with Detective Shane Vendrell has been described as the "centrepiece of The Shield". Shane was Vic's best friend since before the creation of the Strike Team. The season two prequel episode 'Co-Pilot' shows that they were partners before the events of season one. The strength of their friendship is evident in season one, in how Vic initially only keeps Shane informed of some of his darker schemes, leaving Lem and Ronnie out. However, their relationship eventually becomes strained when Shane enters into a serious relationship with Mara, who is very demanding of his time.

After Lemansky burns the money train cash, Vic is unable to resolve the subsequent animosity between Lemansky and Shane. Indeed, he finds himself embroiled in it when Shane accuses Vic of taking other people's side against him when they are supposed to be best friends. Vic calls Mara a bitch who has got Shane so twisted that he cannot think straight anymore. The two fall out, and the strike team is disbanded.

During season 4 Shane and Vic reconcile after Shane gets involved with the drug lord and gang leader Antwon Mitchell, who kills a young girl using Shane's gun. Blackmailing Shane, he offers to hand her body over to him in return for the body of Vic Mackey. Shane contacts Vic to meet him alone. After convincing Vic of his innocence in the girl's murder, the two men work together again, along with Ronnie and Lem, to save Shane's career and put Antwon behind bars. Following this, the Strike Team is reformed.

When Vic learns the truth about Shane's murder of Lem, Vic confronts Shane, and tells him that if he ever sees him again, he would kill him. Shane drives off, calling Vic a hypocrite.

Vic and Ronnie ultimately decide that the time had come for Shane to pay with his life for murdering Lem. They arrange for him to be assassinated by a Mexican drug cartel. At the last second, Vic tries to call off the hit on Shane, but was unable to reach Shane on his cell phone. Through sheer luck, Shane survives. Vic later expresses regret over this incident. In a conversation with Ronnie, Vic reminds himself that he and Shane go back a very long time and that Shane used to be different. He surmises that Shane's change for the worse is a result of Vic's own influence on him, and resolves to help Shane instead of killing him. Shane, unaware of Vic's feelings, decides to retaliate by blackmailing a small-time pimp into murdering Ronnie in his apartment, while preparing to murder Vic at Vic's apartment himself. The attempt on Ronnie's life is botched, as well as Vic's when Ronnie alerts him about what happened. The pimp is later apprehended, and reveals the truth, forcing Shane to flee and go on the run with his pregnant wife and son. Shane tries to force Vic to provide him with enough money to escape and information to keep the LAPD away until that can happen, but a series of mistakes by Shane leads to his decision to turn Vic in and accept his likely life sentence in prison, as long as he can get immunity for Mara on the way. When Vic intercepts a confession letter that Shane sent to the precinct that outlined all of his crimes, he uses it to get an immunity deal of his own with ICE, that will cover both him and Ronnie. Vic later goes for and gets the deal for himself when he believes he has to betray Ronnie in order to save his wife from being arrested and sent to jail (not realizing that his wife was part of a setup to try and get Vic arrested and jailed without Shane's input).

Ultimately, Shane is horrified to learn of Vic's immunity deal during a cell phone conversation, where Shane's sneering comments about how Vic's wife betrayed him lead Vic to coldly outline how he'll always be there to tell Shane's kids his dirty stories while he and Mara serve life sentences, and then hang up on Shane for the last time. As a result of Vic's taunts, Shane murders his pregnant wife, Mara, and his son Jackson by poison. As his fellow officers kick down the door, Shane shoots himself in the head. In the series finale, Vic places a picture of himself and Lem on his new desk at ICE headquarters. Though originally, the picture was of all four members of the Strike Team, Vic seems to have cropped Shane and Ronnie out of the frame, unable to reconcile himself with Shane's betrayal of Lem and subsequent suicide.

==== Relationship with Ronnie ====
Digital Spy write that Ronnie Gardocki "showed his loyalty to Vic [...] more than any of the others". The Los Angeles Times also describe Gardocki as "unreasonably loyal" to Vic. When the Strike Team is temporarily disbanded at the end of season three, Ronnie is the only one to stay by Vic's side when Shane and Lem went their separate ways.

Gardocki's loyalty is exhibited best when Shane reveals his and Vic's murder of Terry Crowley years earlier, in order to drive a wedge between the remaining two members of the Strike Team. Ronnie reveals to Vic that he had long suspected the latter's involvement and that he understands why Vic did what he did. Furthermore, Ronnie adds that he could have provided Mackey with emotional support after the murder, citing that he would have "looked out for [Mackey] better" than Vendrell did.

Ronnie panics at the thought of Shane, now a fugitive, being arrested and confessing to the many crimes committed by the Strike Team and even considers running to Mexico. However, Vic dissuades him and tries to arrange ICE jobs for the both of them.

When ICE offers Vic immunity but not Ronnie, Vic refuses to accept unless Ronnie receives a similar deal too. However, after witnessing the staged arrest of his ex-wife, Corinne, Vic takes the deal and confesses to everything.

After Beltran's arrest, Vic and Ronnie are summoned back to The Barn. Believing that they are both safe forever, Ronnie is shocked when he is handcuffed. Enraged and devastated by Vic's betrayal, Ronnie shouts profanity at his former mentor. Vic is noticeably crushed by seeing his last remaining friend arrested. In the series finale, Vic is seen placing a picture of himself and Lem on his new desk at ICE headquarters. Though originally the picture was of all four members of the Strike Team at a celebration, Vic cropped Shane and Ronnie out of the frame, unable to reconcile himself with his own betrayal of Ronnie.

==== Relationship with Lemansky ====
Lem is described as "loyal to Mackey, and goes along with the [...] team's schemes even when it gives him a guilty conscience." Lem was reluctant to participate in the robbing of the Armenian mob, and his subsequent burning of the money train cash to elude capture ignites antagonism between him and Shane Vendrell, which ultimately brings the entire team's existence to an end.

When the Strike Team eventually returns, Vic had Lem get collateral from a drug dealer to ensure a tip regarding the whereabouts of a body that could implicate Shane. Lemansky takes a brick of heroin from the dealer. The heroin is later seized by IAD from Lemansky's car and Lemansky then becomes a means with which Lieutenant Jon Kavanaugh can take down the entire Strike Team. Lem's loyalty is tested when he found out Vic killed Terry, but he remains loyal to the team. After hearing false reports that Lemansky is considering testifying against the team for a lighter sentence, Shane kills Lem with a grenade. A running theme in the last few seasons of the series was Vic's regret towards what happened to Lem. In the aftermath, Vic undertook several actions to avenge Lem's death, including torturing and killing suspect Guardo Lima and trying to murder real killer Shane Vendrell on multiple occasions after he learns of Shane's role in Lem's death. Lem, the only one Vic still had an untainted friendship with, remained the one Strike Team member in the Strike Team photo in Vic's cubicle at ICE.

==== Relationship with Aceveda ====
Personality clashes play a major part in the premise of The Shield, and the clash between Mackey and David Aceveda has been described as the most prominent. The Guardian also notes the internal conflict between Mackey and Aceveda as being one of the highlights of the programme. The tension between Mackey and Aceveda evolves in different ways over the course of The Shield. Although Aceveda privately detests Mackey, he was not above breaking the law himself. He also frequently blurs the lines between investigating Mackey and protecting him. Wired suggests Aceveda is only "interested in leveraging what [he knows] (or, at least, suspects) about the Strike Team to climb further up the ladder."

In the first season, Aceveda is heavily bent on proving Mackey's guilt, putting all his effort into taking him down. While Mackey detests Aceveda's political ambitions, Aceveda continued to label Mackey as "Al Capone with a badge."

At the start of the second season, Aceveda, not wanting a scandal in the midst of his political career, agrees to watch Mackey's back if he could make the Strike Team appear to clean up their act and exhibit professionalism at all times. This creates a very subtle, bumpy friendship between the two. This friendship, however, ends when Aceveda left for his City Council position, but not before writing a scathing letter that makes Mackey out to be an ineffective detective and accusing him of Terry Crowley's murder, irreparably damaging his career.

After Vic arranges an immunity deal with ICE, Aceveda is enraged that Vic can never be prosecuted for any of his crimes. The two collaborate one last time, however, in order to arrange the arrest of drug lord Guillermo Beltran. While speaking over the phone, Aceveda expresses satisfaction that ICE had realized that, "they have a reptile working for them." Uninterested in Aceveda's views on his character, Vic coldly reminded Aceveda about "respecting each others' endgames", marking the final communication between the two men.

==== Other relationships ====
Mackey's training officer and first partner was Joe Clark, who taught him how to deal with violent street criminals and how to bend the laws to his advantage. Clark was eventually dismissed from the force for beating a suspect. Clark's legacy to Vic was the justification that they always "did more good than bad". In season 6, Mackey re-encounters Clark, who has become a for-hire enforcer who uses his intimidation skills from his days as a cop to earn an income. Mackey participates in one raid, and realizes this type of occupation is both dangerous and unnecessarily cruel.

Mackey also has a close friendship with a prostitute, Connie Reisler, whom in an unseen story he found "lying in a bathroom in a pool of bloody crystals", trying to end her pregnancy with drain cleaner and a plunger. He told her if she ever needed any help she could call him, and they developed a deep bond. However, Connie is killed in season two.

For many years, Vic has an on-off sexual relationship with Sergeant Danny Sofer and fathered her illegitimate son Lee. Vic is later angered by Danny's attempts to have Vic sign documents legally abandoning his claim to being Lee's father. In season 6, Vic's daughter Cassidy angrily confronts Mackey after listening to her mother discussing the baby's paternity over the telephone.

In season one, Mackey is nearly taken down when rookie Officer Julien Lowe catches Vic and the Strike Team stealing cocaine from a crime scene. Although Julien approaches Captain Aceveda and promises to testify against Vic and the Team, Mackey swiftly obtains leverage against Julien. Vic discovers Julien is involved in a homosexual relationship with a wanted fugitive. Holding the upper hand, Vic threatens to denounce Julien's homosexuality to the entire precinct unless Julien recants his allegations. Julien, afraid of being outed, acquiesces to Vic's demands. In season six, Julien is promoted to the strike team by Captain Wyms. Despite their past differences, Julien and Mackey work well on cases together and show each other respect.

Vic also has a notable relationship with Detective Dutch Wagenbach. Vic perceives Dutch as arrogant, making him the target of Vic's practical jokes early in the series. The nature of their relationship often changes, however. After Dutch almost single-handedly apprehends a serial killer, Vic learns to respect him, and the practical jokes cease. They often cooperate on cases during this period and develop a minor friendship. This changes however when Dutch begins to correctly suspect that Mackey was behind the Armenian money train robbery. When Mackey learns that Dutch has been pointing the finger at him to Aceveda, Mackey's respect for Dutch evaporates and the practical jokes resume. During this time, Dutch begins a relationship with Vic's ex-wife Corrine, which he admits he started, at least initially, to get back at Vic. During a fight between Dutch and his new partner, Billings, Vic mocks Dutch during the brawl. When Vic attempts to split the fight up, Dutch punches Vic out of anger over the latter's bullying of him. Vic doesn't strike back, instead he lays off Dutch and the practical jokes cease once again. Dutch later helps Corrine try and have Vic arrested and later helps her enter Witness Protection.

Vic initially has a neutral relationship with Detective Claudette Wyms, the two initially share no friendship or antagonism, and even successfully collaborate in series one. Series two however sees Wyms unravel some of Vic and the Strike Team's corruption, and their relationship is permanently tainted. When Wyms is promoted to Captain in series six, this hostility remains. Similar to Aceveda before her, she tries unsuccessfully to have Vic brought to justice.

== Reception ==
Mackey has been summarised as an "effective but corrupt cop who operates under his own set of rules" and is often regarded as one of the greatest antiheroes in television history. On Bravo TV's countdown of the 100 Greatest Television Characters, Michael Chiklis described Mackey as "a cross between Hannibal Lecter and Dirty Harry." Commenting on the casting of Chiklis, the Mail Tribune stated, "Given that Chiklis was stretching beyond his comedic roles, the announcement of his casting had everyone scratching their heads. But he proved to everyone he was more than capable for the challenge. His portrayal to this day stands out as one of television's most despised and most rooted for characters. And it all started with Vic killing another cop and the coverup that follows."

James Donaghy, writing for The Guardian, describes Mackey as "a character as compelling as any from the prestige TV era." He goes on to write, "his game is on a whole other level. He makes Dirty Harry look like Barney Miller [...] Mackey is ferociously intelligent, utterly ruthless and terrifyingly brave. Watching him keep one step ahead of Aceveda, Internal Affairs and drug lords is one of the joys of the show." He concludes, "That you end up sympathising, even identifying with him is testament to Ryan's deft characterisation and Chiklis's magnificent performance. For all his flaws, Mackey sincerely loves his wife and autistic son and has a vulnerability and wit that makes it hard to hate him even when you know he's indefensible." Men's Health also comment on the likeability of the character despite his immorality, adding, "Is Mackey a violent, autism-phobic piece of shit? Yes he is. Do we still want him to avoid prison? Somehow, unbelievably, yes." Maria Elena Fernandez for the Los Angeles Times shares similar sentiments, stating the distinction between right or wrong is "to put it mildly, blurry for Mackey, who manages to be a hero and an antihero simultaneously, committing the most heinous acts imaginable while eliciting compassion from viewers."

Dariel Figueroa of Uproxx, however, rejects the idea that Mackey is easy to sympathize with. He writes, "It's hard to say that Vic Mackey was even an anti-hero, as anti-heroes at least have redeemable qualities. That's not to say that Mackey didn't exhibit some fine police work at times. Mackey put away bad guys just as well as the best TV cops. He did have a family that he cared for, but with Mackey you got a general sense that his family was just a buoy that at the back of his mind he needed to help him validate all the evil things he had done. [...] In the very first episode, Mackey murders a detective and covers it up solely for the purposes of hiding his corruption. For Mackey, it was all about his "retirement fund". [...] When the team came across an illegal Armenian money train, policing was not at the forefront of his thoughts; it was all about 'How can we steal this thing?'" Pete Clark for the Evening Standard also remarks that "the only flicker of humanity in Mackey is his desire to get back his family", but even then "The reason for this is not love, but the burning desire to get back what rightly belongs to him."

In a less than complimentary review, Ken Tucker, in an article for Entertainment Weekly, takes issue with some of the scenes depicting Mackey's brutality, in particular a scene from the series two episode "Dead Soldiers", writing "a squirmy scene in which Mackey holds a naughty man's face against the red-hot coils of a stovetop. Rather than seeming like the logical climax to a harrowing manhunt, the scene comes off as an abrupt but contrived display of shock tactics – a way to maintain media-buzz momentum." He adds "The Shield seems to think that its core premise (Mackey: a hero who does brutal, illegal things) is so intrinsically engrossing, we're not going to notice how recklessly dumb his actions are."

Daniel Feinberg and Inkoo Kang of The Hollywood Reporter highlight that police brutality in the United States is an issue seldom touched upon on television. They both use Vic Mackey to highlight that when such brutality is portrayed, it is often rationalised as necessary. Kang states that The Shield "sensationalized Vic Mackey (Michael Chiklis) and his crew's aggression while frequently contextualizing their violence as part of some larger effort — and therefore of strategic necessity (even if there was never any doubt that their schemes were to enrich themselves and continue terrorizing L.A.'s criminals with impunity)." While Finberg adds, "with somebody like The Shield's Vic Mackey, it's supposed to be a push and pull for viewers as to whether we're willing to accept an ends-justifies-the-means approach; is Vic's success in stopping killers, wife-beaters and pedophiles enough to excuse the things he does to get there? Even if the end of The Shield leaves absolutely no ambiguity at all that Vic is a character doomed to, at the very least, a metaphorical hell for his actions, you can't stop viewers from having their own interpretations."

In an article on "why he likes nightmarish policemen despite misgivings", Andrew Billen of the New Statesman writes, "Mackey is a thug on the take, not Dixon of Dock Green meets The Enforcer. He's a different type of cop, all right, a maniac cop, and it is his deranged soul that fascinates our writer. At a time when forensic procedure has come to dominate the most successful American crime shows, spawning in the US multiple spin-offs from Law and Order and CSI, The Shield, despite its sensationalist, over-schematic premise, pushes character back into the limelight."

Vic Mackey was seen as a pattern of more violent anti-heroes on television. For example, Tim Goodman for the San Francisco Chronicle writes that Mackey "doesn't just cross the ethical line, [he] stomps on it. Forget good cop-bad cop. Mackey is a vicious cop." Ginia Bellafante of The New York Times writes that Mackey "jury-rigged the rules so aggressively, and so often based on nothing more than his own self-interest, that he left the Jack Bauers and Dirty Harrys to seem like hospital gift shop volunteers." Ben Sherlock of Screen Rant adds, "Arriving between the trendsetting reign of Tony Soprano and the game-changing transformation of Walter White, Vic Mackey enjoyed a fascinating arc on The Shield. [...] It's not easy to make a crooked cop work as the protagonist of a police procedural, but Michael Chiklis made for a riveting lead and series creator Shawn Ryan used this atypical hero to put a fun twist on a well-worn genre." James Poniewozik for Time describes him as "Tony Soprano with a badge, the stresses and contradictions of his life betrayed by his tensed jaw and cornered-animal eyes." Similarly, Emily St. James, writing for Slant Magazine adds "In many ways, Mackey is worse than even Tony Soprano. While Tony has been indirectly responsible for the deaths of innocents, the murders he handles directly are those of people who all have blood on their hands. Mackey has killed (and will, so it is implied, kill again) just to better his own station in life, and that gives the show's attitudes towards him a problematic strain."

John Doyle for The Globe and Mail summarizes Mackey as a "bullet-headed goon who is manipulative, corrupt and amoral" and "the embodiment of an America corrupted by greed." On the other hand, Allan Johnson writing for the Chicago Tribune describes Mackey as "a pugnacious brute who wants to keep the peace and protect the innocent – he just seems to relish being loutish about it." He writes that "It's [Mackey's] complexity that makes The Shield a fascinating, if sometimes uncomfortable, series. [...] It is the line that Mackey crosses in the name of justice that gives The Shield its fire, a world that will test viewers who may like their heroes with fewer shades of gray.
