= The Shield =

American crime drama television series

- Genre: Crime drama; Action; Police procedural; Tragedy
- Created by: Shawn Ryan
- Showrunner: Shawn Ryan
- Starring: Michael Chiklis; Catherine Dent; Walton Goggins; Michael Jace; Kenny Johnson; Jay Karnes; Benito Martinez; CCH Pounder; Glenn Close; Cathy Cahlin Ryan; David Rees Snell; Paula Garcés; David Marciano
- Country of origin: United States
- Original language: English
- No. of seasons: 7
- No. of episodes: 88 (list of episodes)

Production
- Executive producers: Shawn Ryan; Scott Brazil; Glen Mazzara; Charles H. Eglee; Kurt Sutter; Scott Rosenbaum; Adam Fierro
- Producer: Michael Chiklis; Kevin G. Cremin; Craig Yahata; Elizabeth Craft; Sarah Fain
- Production locations: Los Angeles, California
- Cinematography: Rohn Schmidt; Richard Cantu
- Running time: 41–75 minutes
- Production companies: The Barn Productions; MiddKid Productions; Sony Pictures Television (Note: Known as Columbia TriStar Domestic Television for the first season.); Fox Television Studios

Original release
- Network: FX
- Release: March 12, 2002 – November 25, 2008

The Shield is an American crime drama television series created by Shawn Ryan, which aired on FX from March 12, 2002, to November 25, 2008, for seven seasons. It stars Michael Chiklis as Vic Mackey, the leader of a corrupt Los Angeles Police Department unit loosely based on the Rampart Division police scandal. The series also stars Catherine Dent, Walton Goggins, Michael Jace, Kenny Johnson, Jay Karnes, Benito Martinez and CCH Pounder.

The series has received critical acclaim and is widely regarded as one of the greatest television series of all time. It was nominated for six Primetime Emmy Awards over its run, with Michael Chiklis winning the Outstanding Lead Actor in a Drama Series in 2002. The Shield won the Golden Globe Award for Best Actor – Television Series Drama in 2003, with the series winning Best Television Series – Drama the same year.

== Premise ==
The Shield follows the activities of an experimental division of the Los Angeles Police Department set up in the fictional Farmington district ("the Farm") of Los Angeles, a district rife with gang-related violence, drug trafficking, and prostitution. Operating out of a converted church ("the Barn"), they work to maintain the peace in the district and reduce crime.

At the center of the division is the Strike Team, led by Detectives Vic Mackey, Shane Vendrell, Curtis Lemansky, and Ronnie Gardocki. Mackey and the Strike Team use criminal methods to coerce information and stage arrests and take a share of various drug busts. Although the Strike Team's questionably high success rate leaves the division's head, Captain David Aceveda, suspicious of their methods, he values their success as they help his political efforts to become mayor of Los Angeles.

Attempts to place a fifth member on the Strike Team not in Mackey's circle go astray. The pilot episode concludes with Mackey, suspicious of the loyalty of the latest Strike Team recruit, Terry Crowley, fatally shooting him during an arrest and framing their suspect. This sets in motion events that loom over the Strike Team and continue throughout the series.

The show has an ensemble cast featuring the other officers in the Farmington district. This includes detectives Holland "Dutch" Wagenbach, Steve Billings and Claudette Wyms, uniformed officers Sgt. Danielle "Danny" Sofer, Julien Lowe, and Tina Hanlon. The series has a variety of subplots, notably Aceveda's political aspirations and his suffering a sexual assault; Mackey's struggle to cope with a failing marriage, two autistic children, and rebellious eldest daughter; Danny becoming a mother; Vendrell's rocky, new marriage; Lemansky's growing fear for the safety of the Strike Team; Claudette's battle with illness and Lowe's internal conflicts between his Christian beliefs and his homosexuality.

The Shield and the Strike Team were inspired by the Rampart Division Community Resources Against Street Hoodlums (CRASH) unit within the Los Angeles Police Department. Rampart was seriously considered as the series' name and was even used in some early promotional ads for the series.

Characters are portrayed with vices and virtues; Vic's loving relationship with his children contrasts with his thuggish approach to police work. Two of the many examples of Mackey's criminal and sociopathic behavior include an attempt to rob the "Armenian Money Train", a money laundering operation of the Armenian Mafia in season 2 and having a police dog maul a rape suspect.

The timeline of the seven seasons of the show covers approximately three years.

== Series overview ==
| Season | Episodes | Originally released | |
| Season | Episodes | First released | Last released |
|---|---|---|---|
| 1 | 13 | March 12, 2002 | June 4, 2002 |
| 2 | 13 | January 7, 2003 | April 1, 2003 |
| 3 | 15 | March 9, 2004 | June 15, 2004 |
| 4 | 13 | March 15, 2005 | June 14, 2005 |
| 5 | 11 | January 10, 2006 | March 21, 2006 |
| 6 | 10 | April 3, 2007 | June 5, 2007 |
| 7 | 13 | September 2, 2008 | November 25, 2008 |

=== Season 1 ===
Season 1 premiered on March 12, 2002, and concluded on June 4, 2002, consisting of 13 episodes. The season deals with Mackey and Vendrell covering up their shooting of Terry Crowley, a plant on the Strike Team placed by David Aceveda and the Department of Justice, who have been suspicious of the Strike Team's activities. Dutch believes a serial killer is targeting prostitutes. Lowe struggles with his sexual orientation and his Christian morals, making him a target for blackmail. Sofer, who is having an affair with Mackey, finds herself both concerned and frustrated while training Lowe. Acevada uses his investigation into Mackey to leverage himself in the community for his own political ambitions.

=== Season 2 ===
Season 2 premiered on January 7, 2003, and concluded on April 1, 2003, consisting of 13 episodes. The first half of the season deals with a new drug threat from Armadillo, a highly intelligent immigrant who has coerced opposing Hispanic gangs to unite under him, making it difficult for the Strike Team to charge him. The second half of the season deals with the Strike Team's discovery of the Armenian "money train" used to ship laundered money out of the United States. Mackey and the Strike Team successfully hijack the shipment, ending up with millions of dollars for themselves. Aceveda makes an agreement with Mackey to protect each other while Aceveda runs for city council. Claudette, whose own investigation into Armadillo is hampered by Mackey and Aceveda, is forced out of her passive role and prepares to take an active role as a moral leader. Dutch makes a major mistake in an investigation and begins second guessing himself. Lowe gets married but nearly gets outed to the department by a former lover. Sofer finds herself becoming a pawn in Barn politics and begins to question the Strike Team's ethics.

=== Season 3 ===
Season 3 premiered on March 9, 2004, and concluded on June 15, 2004, consisting of 15 episodes. The season deals with fallout from the money train robbery. Mackey learns that a portion of the money was marked by the Treasury Department, and the Strike Team figures out ways of diverting any federal attention to their activities. However, the tension of having the money gets to Lemansky, and in an off-the-cuff decision, burns most of the money before the others can stop him. This leads to the dissolution of the Strike Team. Dutch struggles to find balance while looking into both the money train robbery and a serial rapist. Claudette begins administrative duties in preparation to take over as captain but her qualms over a potentially incompetent defense attorney put her career in jeopardy. After the fallout of nearly being outed in the previous season, Lowe starts taking on a tougher demeanor, making Claudette question his future.

=== Season 4 ===
Season 4 premiered on March 15, 2005, and concluded on June 14, 2005, consisting of 13 episodes. During this season, the members of the Strike Team become involved with the affairs of Antwon Mitchell, a highly respected drug lord who ends up blackmailing Vendrell to coerce his help. Mackey, with the help of the new Barn Captain, Monica Rawling, manages to help Vendrell out of his situation, reunites the Strike Team, and eventually ends up with sufficient evidence to send Mitchell to jail. However, Rawling finds herself dismissed as captain due to her approach of seizing any assets tied to drug money. Claudette and Dutch continue to be shut out of meaningful cases by the DA's office, forcing Dutch to make a backroom deal to save his and Claudette's careers. A rift forms between Lowe and Sofer over the seizures policy. Aceveda uses the seizures policy to get more power on the city council and ultimately push his own agenda.

=== Season 5 ===
Season 5 premiered on January 10, 2006, and concluded on March 21, 2006, consisting of 11 episodes. The LAPD's Internal Affairs Division opens an investigation led by Lt. Jon Kavanaugh against Lemansky, purportedly for not reporting a stash of drugs he had taken, but in actuality to find evidence of the Strike Team's misdeeds. Mackey learns of Kavanaugh's true intent, and tries to humiliate Kavanaugh to show the investigation is personal. Enraged, Kavanaugh puts on more pressure and charges Lemansky. The Strike Team attempts to smuggle Lemansky out of the country, but Vendrell, fearing Lemansky will talk, kills him with a grenade, ending the investigation. Lowe trains Tina Hanlon but quickly believes she may not be cut out for the job. Dutch and Claudette focus on the serial killer they have no evidence against while it becomes clear Claudette's health is deteriorating. Billings' weak management, coupled with Kavanaugh's strong-arm tactics, forces the LAPD chief to name a stronger and more independent captain to the Barn, Claudette.

==== "Wins and Losses" ====
The producers of The Shield produced a 15-minute "promosode", which premiered on Google Video on February 15, 2007, to bridge the gap between seasons 5 and 6. The episode focuses on the aftermath of Lemanksky's death, including his funeral and flashbacks as co-workers reflect upon his life. The episode was said to have cost between $500,000 and $1 million to produce. It was on bud.tv for four weeks and later released to AOL and other media outlets. The "promosode" is also one of the special features included on the season 5 DVD set.

=== Season 6 ===
Season 6 premiered on April 3, 2007, and concluded on June 5, 2007, consisting of 10 episodes. The Strike Team struggles with Lemansky's death, and suspect one of the gangs committed it, while Vendrell remains quiet regarding his role. Kavanaugh continues his investigation outside of Internal Affairs, but is eventually forced to admit to planting evidence and is arrested. Mackey learns he is being forced into early retirement and tries to fight back by proving his value. Tensions on the Strike Team led Vendrell to admit to killing Lemansky, and knowing that Mackey will likely kill him, he turns to the Armenian mob for protection, only to expose the team's role in the money-train heist, putting their families at risk. Vendrell writes up all their crimes and mails duplicates to use as blackmail against Mackey. Claudette fights to keep the Barn from being shut down. Dutch tries to adjust to his new partnership with Billings and his crush on Hanlon. Sofer, recently promoted to sergeant, tries to find balance being a working single mother. Lowe joins the Strike Team, now under the command of Kevin Hiatt. Aceveda finds a strong financial backer who may be too good to be true.

Season 6 was originally intended to be aired as the second half of season 5, but FX decided to refer to these 10 episodes as season 6 instead.

=== Season 7 ===
Season 7 premiered on September 2, 2008, and concluded on November 25, 2008, consisting of 13 episodes. Mackey and Aceveda discover the Mexican cartel is looking to influence Farmington, and work with ICE to take them down. Mackey also uses the opportunity to secure a position at ICE in exchange for immunity for his crimes on the Strike Team. The Barn gains significant evidence to arrest the Strike Team. Vendrell attempts to kill Mackey, but it goes awry, making him and his family fugitives. With no hold over Mackey, he kills himself and his family. Mackey successfully busts the cartel for ICE, but betrays Gardocki, who is arrested for the Strike Team's crimes. Dutch focuses on a kid he is certain will become a serial killer. Sofer attempts to keep Mackey out of their son's life. Corrine, scared when she finally realizes everything Vic is, takes her children into federal witness protection. Claudette and Dutch make one final attempt to get evidence to arrest Mackey, but he is shielded by his deal with ICE; however, Vic then learns that he will be required to work as a desk analyst at ICE, with no official power or responsibilities. The series ends as Mackey, hearing sirens in the distance, holsters his gun and walks out, his destination unknown.

== Cast and characters ==
| Character | Portrayed by | Seasons | | | | | | |
| Character | Portrayed by | 1 | 2 | 3 | 4 | 5 | 6 | 7 |
|---|---|---|---|---|---|---|---|---|
| Vic Mackey | Michael Chiklis | Main | Main | Main | Main | Main | Main | Main |
| Danielle "Danny" Sofer | Catherine Dent | Main | Main | Main | Main | Main | Main | Main |
| Terry Crowley | Reed Diamond | Main (Note: Diamond is only credited as a series regular in the pilot episode and is credited as a guest star in episode 2.) | Guest | | | | | |
| Shane Vendrell | Walton Goggins | Main | Main | Main | Main | Main | Main | Main |
| Julien Lowe | Michael Jace | Main | Main | Main | Main | Main | Main | Main |
| Curtis "Lem" Lemansky | Kenny Johnson | Main | Main | Main | Main | Main | | |
| Holland "Dutch" Wagenbach | Jay Karnes | Main | Main | Main | Main | Main | Main | Main |
| David Aceveda | Benito Martinez | Main | Main | Main | Main | Main | Main | Main |
| Claudette Wyms | CCH Pounder | Main | Main | Main | Main | Main | Main | Main |
| Monica Rawling | Glenn Close | | | | Main | | | |
| Corrine Mackey | Cathy Cahlin Ryan | Recurring | Recurring | Recurring | Starring | Main | Main | Main |
| Ronnie Gardocki | David Rees Snell | Recurring | Recurring | Recurring | Starring | Main | Main | Main |
| Tina Hanlon | Paula Garcés | | | | | Recurring | Recurring | Main |
| Steve Billings | David Marciano | | | | Recurring | Recurring | Recurring | Main |

== Development ==
The series was created by Shawn Ryan. Ryan served as an executive producer for all seven seasons and was the series head writer and showrunner throughout its run. Prior to creating the series Ryan had been working as a producer and writer for the supernatural detective series Angel. He began his television career as a writer for the crime drama Nash Bridges. Nash Bridges was a more up-beat show, and Ryan was required to write scripts that showed the hero succeeding in a positive way, and Ryan sought to write something far different to get that out of his system. He had considered what a cop drama would be like on a premium cable network like HBO and Showtime, taking into account the edge that shows like Homicide: Life on the Street and NYPD Blue had brought to the genre. While trying to decide a direction, the Rampart scandal within the LAPD was exposed, and Ryan took inspiration from those events to craft out a pilot script. He also recently became a father, and wrote into the script his concerns about raising a child in a crime-ridden world. The pilot script had ended with Mackey shooting Crowley; Ryan had the idea of an alternate ending to Donnie Brasco, of where Al Pacino's mobster character would have shot Johnny Depp's undercover FBI character, revealing that the mobster had known his identity all along. He used this ending idea in the pilot for The Shield, not expecting to have to worry about any consequences as he was not sure the script would be picked up. Ryan later commented in 2017 that if he had known how long The Shield would have run for, he would have had a few more episodes to help establish Crowley's character before having Mackey kill him off.

Around 2000, the FX network was looking to find what would be the network's first drama series to help set the tone for their network, given the ongoing success of The Sopranos on rival network HBO. FX's Kevin Reilly wanted a show about an antihero but believed that the cop genre had become tired. However, Reilly was amazed by Ryan's script and greenlit the show in 2001. FX ordered the pilot in March 2001; the episode was filmed in June, and FX issued a series order on August 30, one day before the deadline. Reilly worked with Ryan to help determine how much violence and nudity could be used within the show, as unlike HBO, FX was an ad-sponsored cable channel and beholden to certain content considerations. As they were working towards this, the September 11 attacks occurred, and in their aftermath, Fox was concerned if the show would be appropriate at this time, believing that audiences would not be receptive to seeing police officers portrayed in a negative light. The situation changed following the theatrical release of Training Day in October 2001, a film centered around corrupt cops that was a financial success. Fox was assured by Training Day's reception from audiences that The Shield was allowed to continue, with the pilot first broadcast in March 2002.

Ryan had written the part of Mackey for someone with a young Harrison Ford personality. Due to the complexities of the character, he was uncertain they would have found a suitable actor for the role, and cast his own doubt on his writing. During casting, Ryan had been surprised with Michael Chiklis's audition. Chiklis had gained a soft reputation within Hollywood based on his roles from The Commish and Daddio, and felt that he needed to have a change of pace in future roles, as he was finding himself cast for older, overweight parts. Chiklis spent six months away from acting and losing a significant amount of weight, and for his audition on The Shield, had shaved his head. Ryan was taken by this new appearance feeling it was not appropriate, but found that Chiklis had a certain charisma in his delivery that worked well into the Mackey character. This allowed Ryan to write Mackey as a compassionate figure, able to get away with certain improper actions through his charisma, which served to draw fans to sympathize with Mackey throughout the series. Ryan recognized that with Chiklis as his star, it validated his success as a writer.

Scott Brazil was a co-executive producer for the first season. He became an executive producer for the second season. He was a regular director for the series until his death during production of the sixth season. Brazil and Ryan had worked together on Nash Bridges.

Several of the series more junior writers became executive producers during its run. Glen Mazzara was an executive story editor for the first season and became an executive producer from the fifth season onwards. Mazzara had also worked with Ryan on Nash Bridges. Kurt Sutter and Scott Rosenbaum were staff writers for the first season and became executive producers for the sixth season onwards. Adam E. Fierro joined the crew as a co-producer and writer for the third season and was promoted to executive producer for the seventh season. Veteran television writer Charles H. Eglee joined the crew as a consulting producer for the third season and was promoted to executive producer from the fifth season onwards.

James Manos Jr. served as a consulting producer and writer for the first two seasons. He left the show to develop the Showtime serial killer drama Dexter. NYPD Blue veteran writer Kevin Arkadie was a co-executive producer for the first season only. Nash Bridges writer and producer Reed Steiner replaced Arkadie as co-executive producer for the second season only. Kevin G. Cremin was the series unit production manager throughout its run and became a co-executive producer from the sixth season onwards.

Angel writing team Elizabeth Craft and Sarah Fain joined the crew as co-producers for the third season and became supervising producers before leaving at the close of the sixth season. Dean White was a producer and regular director throughout the series run. Chiklis became a producer from the second season onward and also regularly directed episodes. Post-production supervisor Craig Yahata joined the crew in the third season and eventually became a producer for the seventh season.

The series pilot and finale were directed by Clark Johnson; Johnson had previously starred in Homicide: Life on the Street and made his directing debut on that series. Guy Ferland directed episodes for all seven seasons of The Shield. Rohn Schmidt was a cinematographer for all seven seasons and made his television directing debut on the show. Stephen Kay was a frequent director for the series. Gwyneth Horder-Payton was an assistant director for the show's early seasons and made her television directing debut in the fourth season, she continued to regularly direct episodes thereafter.

Film director Frank Darabont directed an episode for the series. Darabont later reunited with several writers from The Shield for his television adaptation of The Walking Dead comics, including Charles H. Eglee, Glen Mazzara and Adam Fierro. Acclaimed playwright and film writer and director David Mamet directed an episode of the series. Mamet and Ryan collaborated as executive producers on military thriller The Unit. Screenwriter Ted Griffin wrote a single episode of the show. Griffin later created Terriers and was reunited with Shawn Ryan as a fellow executive producer.

== Reception ==
Critical response of The Shield
| Season | Rotten Tomatoes | Metacritic |
|---|---|---|
| 1 | 95% (22 reviews) | 92 (28 reviews) |
| 2 | 92% (12 reviews) | —N/a |
| 3 | 93% (14 reviews) | —N/a |
| 4 | 82% (11 reviews) | —N/a |
| 5 | 100% (12 reviews) | —N/a |
| 6 | 76% (17 reviews) | —N/a |
| 7 | 97% (33 reviews) | 85 (14 reviews) |

Time magazine's James Poniewozik ranked The Shield #8 in his list of the Top 10 Returning Series of 2007 and later included it in his list of the top 100 greatest TV shows of all time. Entertainment Weekly named it the 8th-best TV show of the 2000s, saying, "Det. Vic Mackey didn't just clean up the streets—he cleaned up on the streets. Would he pay for those sins? This gutsy TV drama kept us guessing." On the review aggregator website Metacritic, season 1 received high acclaim from critics, with a score of 92 out of 100, based on 28 reviews. Season 7 also received high acclaim from critics, with a score of 85 out of 100, based on 14 reviews. In September 2019, The Guardian ranked the show 77th on its list of the 100 best TV shows of the 21st century, stating that "a key part...of the golden age of antihero drama, this thriller about likable – and utterly corrupt – cops broke new ground for bold, risk-taking television".

The premiere episode of The Shield had a 4.1 rating, at the time a record for a dramatic program on basic cable. However, The Shield lost advertising from Burger King, New Balance, Office Depot, and Tricon Global Restaurants, in part due to complaints from the Parents Television Council.

== Awards and nominations ==
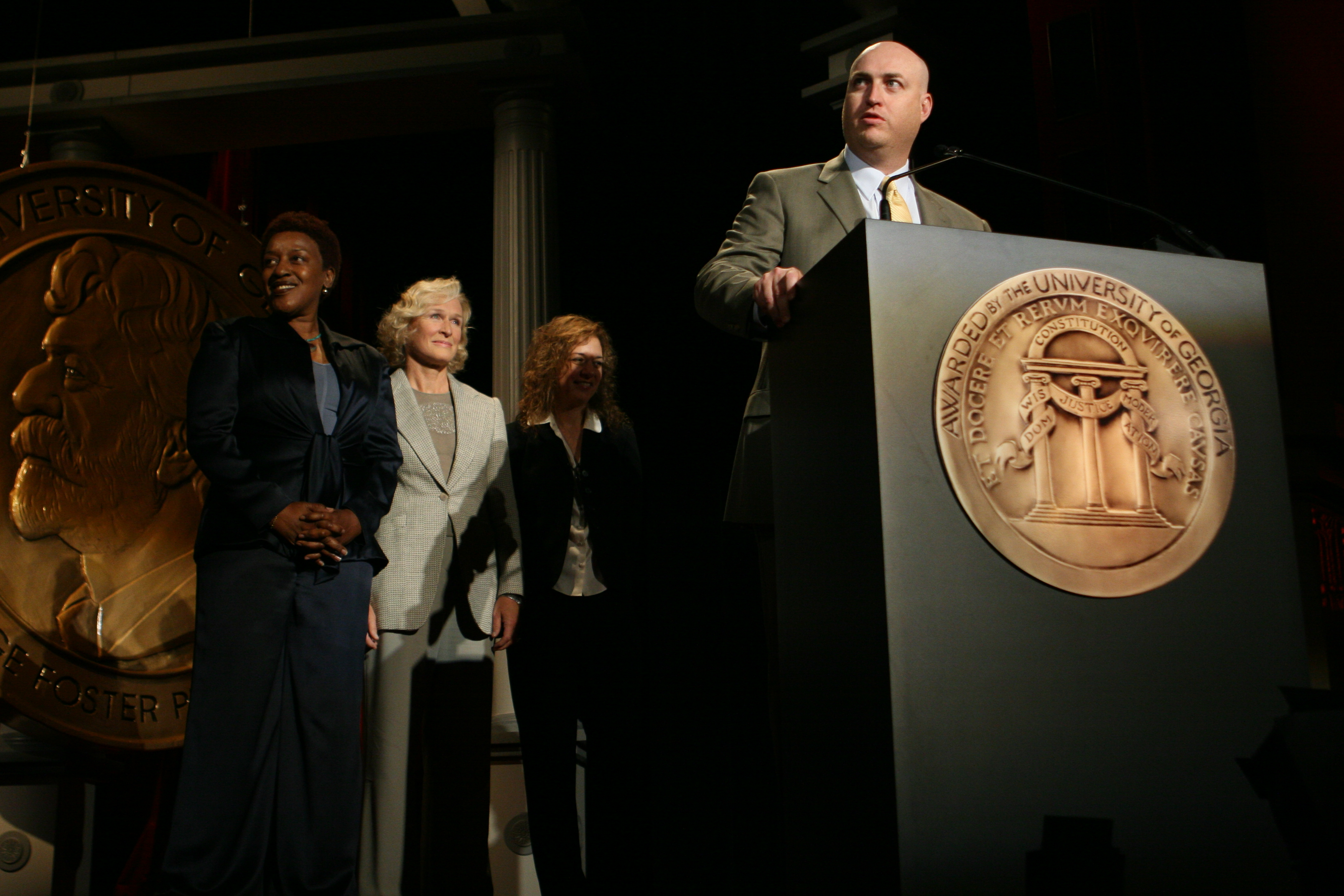
Shawn Ryan with cast members at the 65th Annual Peabody Awards

The series received six Primetime Emmy Awards nominations during its series run. For the first season, Michael Chiklis won for Outstanding Lead Actor in a Drama Series, and the pilot episode received nominations for Outstanding Directing for a Drama Series and Outstanding Writing for a Drama Series, for Clark Johnson and Shawn Ryan respectively. Chiklis received a consecutive nomination Outstanding Lead Actor in a Drama Series for the second season. For the fourth season, Glenn Close was nominated for Outstanding Lead Actress in a Drama Series and CCH Pounder was nominated for Outstanding Supporting Actress in a Drama Series.

For the Golden Globe Awards, the series received five nominations, with Chiklis receiving three consecutive nominations for Best Performance by an Actor in a Television Series – Drama, and winning the award for the first season. The first season also earned the series the award for Best Television Series – Drama. Glenn Close was also nominated for Best Performance by an Actress in a Television Series – Drama.

For the Satellite Awards, the series received seven nominations. CCH Pounder won two consecutive times for Best Actress in a Series, Drama, Chiklis received two nominations with one win for Best Actor in a Series, Drama, and Forest Whitaker was nominated for Best Supporting Actor in a Series, Miniseries or Motion Picture Made for Television. The series won the award for Best Television Series, Drama and received a nomination for that category the following year.

For the TCA Awards, the first season received nominations for Program of the Year, Outstanding New Program, Outstanding Achievement in Drama, and Chiklis won for Individual Achievement in Drama. The series received nominations again for Outstanding Achievement in Drama for the next two seasons. For the final season, it was nominated for Program of the Year and Outstanding Achievement in Drama, as well as receiving the Heritage Award. Also, Walton Goggins was nominated for Individual Achievement in Drama.

| Association | Year (Note: The listed year refers to the date of the ceremony, not necessarily the year in which the corresponding season or episode aired) | Category | Nominee(s) | Result | Ref. |
|---|---|---|---|---|---|
| ADG Excellence in Production Design Awards | 2003 | Excellence in Production Design for Television, Single-Camera Series | James Newport, William J. Durrell Jr. (for "Pilot") | Nominated | |
| AFI Awards | 2005 | Program of the Year | The Shield | Won | |
| AFI Awards | 2009 | Program of the Year | The Shield | Won | |
| ALMA Awards | 2006 | Outstanding Supporting Actor in a Television Series, Mini-Series or Television Movie | Benito Martinez | Nominated | |
| ALMA Awards | 2007 | Outstanding Supporting Actor in a Television Series, Mini-Series or Television Movie | Benito Martinez | Won | |
| ALMA Awards | 2007 | Outstanding Writing in a Television Series, Mini-Series or Television Movie | Charles H. Eglee, Adam E. Fierro (for "Enemy of Good") | Nominated | |
| ALMA Awards | 2008 | Outstanding Supporting Actor in a Drama Television Series | Benito Martinez | Nominated | |
| ALMA Awards | 2008 | Outstanding Supporting Actress in a Drama Television Series | Paula Garcés | Nominated | |
| ALMA Awards | 2009 | Outstanding Actor in a Drama Series | Benito Martinez | Nominated | |
| ALMA Awards | 2009 | Outstanding Actress in a Drama Series | Paula Garcés | Nominated | |
| GLAAD Media Awards | 2003 | Outstanding Drama Series | The Shield | Nominated | |
| Golden Globe Awards | 2003 | Best Television Series – Drama | The Shield | Won | |
| Golden Globe Awards | 2003 | Best Performance by an Actor in a Television Series – Drama | Michael Chiklis | Won | |
| Golden Globe Awards | 2004 | Best Performance by an Actor in a Television Series – Drama | Michael Chiklis | Nominated | |
| Golden Globe Awards | 2005 | Best Performance by an Actor in a Television Series – Drama | Michael Chiklis | Nominated | |
| Golden Globe Awards | 2006 | Best Performance by an Actress in a Television Series – Drama | Glenn Close | Nominated | |
| Imagen Awards | 2006 | Best Supporting Actor – Television | Benito Martinez | Nominated | |
| Imagen Awards | 2007 | Best Supporting Actor – Television | Benito Martinez | Nominated | |
| NAACP Image Awards | 2003 | Outstanding Actress in a Drama Series | CCH Pounder | Nominated | |
| NAACP Image Awards | 2004 | Outstanding Actress in a Drama Series | CCH Pounder | Nominated | |
| NAACP Image Awards | 2006 | Outstanding Actress in a Drama Series | CCH Pounder | Nominated | |
| NAACP Image Awards | 2006 | Outstanding Directing in a Dramatic Series | Phillip G. Atwell | Nominated | |
| NAACP Image Awards | 2007 | Outstanding Actress in a Drama Series | CCH Pounder | Nominated | |
| NAACP Image Awards | 2008 | Outstanding Actress in a Drama Series | CCH Pounder | Nominated | |
| NAACP Image Awards | 2009 | Outstanding Actress in a Drama Series | CCH Pounder | Nominated | |
| Peabody Awards | 2006 | Honoree (Note: Presented to Fox Television Studios in association with Sony Pictures Television) | | Honored | |
| Primetime Emmy Awards | 2002 | Outstanding Lead Actor in a Drama Series | Michael Chiklis (for "Pilot") | Won | |
| Primetime Emmy Awards | 2002 | Outstanding Directing for a Drama Series | Clark Johnson (for "Pilot") | Nominated | |
| Primetime Emmy Awards | 2002 | Outstanding Writing for a Drama Series | Shawn Ryan (for "Pilot") | Nominated | |
| Primetime Emmy Awards | 2003 | Outstanding Lead Actor in a Drama Series | Michael Chiklis (for "Dominoes Falling") | Nominated | |
| Primetime Emmy Awards | 2005 | Outstanding Lead Actress in a Drama Series | Glenn Close (for "Hurt") | Nominated | |
| Primetime Emmy Awards | 2005 | Outstanding Supporting Actress in a Drama Series | CCH Pounder (for "Doghouse" and "Tar Baby") | Nominated | |
| Satellite Awards | 2003 | Best Actor in a Series, Drama | Michael Chiklis | Nominated | |
| Satellite Awards | 2003 | Best Actress in a Series, Drama | CCH Pounder | Won | |
| Satellite Awards | 2004 | Best Television Series, Drama | The Shield | Won | |
| Satellite Awards | 2004 | Best Actor in a Series, Drama | Michael Chiklis | Won | |
| Satellite Awards | 2004 | Best Actress in a Series, Drama | CCH Pounder | Won | |
| Satellite Awards | 2005 | Best Television Series, Drama | The Shield | Nominated | |
| Satellite Awards | 2006 | Best Actor in a Supporting Role in a Series, Mini-Series or Motion Picture Made for Television | Forest Whitaker | Nominated | |
| Screen Actors Guild Awards | 2003 | Outstanding Performance by a Male Actor in a Drama Series | Michael Chiklis | Nominated | |
| TCA Awards | 2002 | Program of the Year | The Shield | Nominated | |
| TCA Awards | 2002 | Outstanding New Program | The Shield | Nominated | |
| TCA Awards | 2002 | Outstanding Achievement in Drama | The Shield | Nominated | |
| TCA Awards | 2002 | Individual Achievement in Drama | Michael Chiklis | Won | |
| TCA Awards | 2003 | Outstanding Achievement in Drama | The Shield | Nominated | |
| TCA Awards | 2004 | Outstanding Achievement in Drama | The Shield | Nominated | |
| TCA Awards | 2009 | Program of the Year | The Shield | Nominated | |
| TCA Awards | 2009 | Outstanding Achievement in Drama | The Shield | Nominated | |
| TCA Awards | 2009 | Individual Achievement in Drama | Walton Goggins | Nominated | |
| TCA Awards | 2009 | Heritage Award | | Nominated | |
| TCA Awards | 2015 | Heritage Award | | Nominated | |

== Other media ==
=== Comic ===
In 2004, IDW Publishing released a five-issue comic book limited series written by Jeff Mariotte and illustrated by Jean Diaz titled The Shield: Spotlight. A controversial journalist is murdered and the Barn is under intense media scrutiny. Vic and the Strike Team find the murderer but uncover a bigger conspiracy which has Dutch enthralled. All the while, Shane is trying to keep his face out of the media when he accidentally sets up a chance to earn the team much money recovering stolen art, and Julien and Danny struggle to realize when is the right time to go "by the book" and when is not. When uniformed officers spot the Strike Team with the stolen art, they have no choice but to do things the right way. Aceveda is warned to drop the journalists investigation or risk losing political backing. He drops the case which leaves Dutch feeling disheartened.

=== Home media ===
The first five seasons were originally distributed by 20th Century Fox Home Entertainment for region 1. However, in 2008, Sony Pictures Home Entertainment became the rights holders for the DVDs. They released season 6 and re-released seasons 1–5 in slimmer packaging in 2008, and released season 7 in 2009. International releases have always been distributed by Sony, who have only ever presented the show in 16:9 (widescreen) format, as opposed to the Fox releases, which presented the show in 4:3. All the re-releases by Sony along with seasons 6 and 7, and the complete series box set are presented in widescreen. The Sony region 2 release of season 5 has a shortened version of the season finale—48 minutes, as opposed to the regular 67-minute version.

| DVD title | Release dates | | | |
| DVD title | Region 1 (Fox) | Region 1 (Sony Pictures) | Region 2 | Region 4 |
|---|---|---|---|---|
| The Complete First Season | January 7, 2003 | March 25, 2008 | July 21, 2003 | February 11, 2004 |
| The Complete Second Season | January 6, 2004 | March 25, 2008 | August 9, 2004 | April 5, 2005 |
| The Complete Third Season | February 22, 2005 | March 25, 2008 | May 28, 2007 | May 11, 2007 |
| The Complete Fourth Season | December 26, 2005 | March 25, 2008 | July 2, 2007 | November 15, 2007 |
| The Complete Fifth Season | March 27, 2007 | March 25, 2008 | January 28, 2008 | March 10, 2009 |
| The Complete Sixth Season | —N/a | August 26, 2008 | March 24, 2008 | August 18, 2009 |
| The Complete Seventh Season | —N/a | June 9, 2009 | June 8, 2009 | November 24, 2010 |
| The Complete Series | —N/a | November 3, 2009 | June 8, 2009 | November 23, 2010 |

In November 2012, all seven seasons were made available for purchase on iTunes. On February 26, 2013, Amazon.com announced the addition of the series to its Prime service, but the series is now only available for purchase. The series is available for streaming on Hulu as part of FX's catalog. All seven seasons are available on Netflix throughout Latin America. In May 2025, all seven seasons became available on Tubi in the United States.

On August 28, 2015, Shawn Ryan announced that he was revisiting the series for a 4K conversion. In August 2017, Ryan announced the release had been delayed until 2018. In July 2018, Mill Creek Entertainment announced it would be releasing the complete series of The Shield on Blu-ray and that it would include all the extras from the previous DVD sets and includes new, exclusive featurettes. It was released on December 18, 2018.

=== Soundtrack ===
On September 5, 2005, The Shield: Music from the Streets was released by Lakeshore Entertainment. The soundtrack features 19 tracks, including two versions of the theme song and tracks ranging from artists such as Black Label Society to Kelis.

=== Video game ===
After a rocky development cycle, The Shield, the video game, was released for the PlayStation 2 on January 9, 2007, and for the PC on January 22, 2007. It is a third-person shooter that bridges the gap between the third and fourth seasons by exploring the gang war between the Byz-Lats and the One-Niners. It received generally negative reviews.
