= Kevin Arkadie =

American television writer and producer (1957–2025)

Kevin Arkadie (December 10, 1957 – December 17, 2025) was an American television writer and producer. He was known for his work on New York Undercover, Chicago Hope, and The Shield. Arkadie died on December 17, 2025, at the age of 68.
