= Scott Brazil =

American television producer and director (1955–2006)

- Born: Scott Beaird Brazil; May 12, 1955; Sacramento County, California, U.S.
- Died: April 17, 2006 (aged 50); Sherman Oaks, California, U.S.

Scott Brazil (May 12, 1955 – April 17, 2006) was an American television producer and director.

== Early life and education ==
Brazil was born in Sacramento County, California. His childhood home was in Sacramento's South Land Park Hills neighborhood.

He was a graduate of the University of Southern California where he earned a bachelor of science degree from the USC Annenberg School for Communication and Journalism.

== Career ==
Brazil started his career as an associate producer on The White Shadow from 1979-1981.

=== Hill Street Blues ===
Brazil began working on Hill Street Blues as an associate producer from 1981-1982. He worked as a producer from 1982-1983, and was the supervising producer from 1983-1986. He won Emmy Awards for Outstanding Drama Series in 1983 and 1984 and a Golden Globe Award in 1983 for his work on Hill Street Blues. He was also nominated for Emmys for that series in both 1985 and 1986 and Golden Globes in 1984 and 1985. He worked in various capacities on 116 of 144 episodes of the show.

=== The Shield ===
He worked on The Shield from its premiere in 2002, directing 11 episodes of the series. As a producer, he shared in the show's 2003 Golden Globe Award for best drama series. The season six premiere was dedicated to his memory.

=== Other work ===
Brazil directed episodes of Grey's Anatomy, JAG (8 episodes), Nip/Tuck (2 episodes), CSI: Miami, LAX, Buffy the Vampire Slayer, and Nash Bridges.

Brazil partnered with Larry Garrison, president of Silver Creek Entertainment, producing film and television for 18 years. He produced TV 101, WIOU, Space Rangers, Like Mother, Like Son and Live Shot. He was a co-executive producer of Cracker, Gideon's Crossing and L.A. Doctors.

Brazil was a member of the Directors Guild of America and the Academy of Television Arts & Sciences.

== Personal life and death ==
Brazil died in Sherman Oaks, California on April 17, 2006, aged 50, of respiratory failure from complications of ALS (Lou Gehrig's disease) and Lyme disease.

== Posthumous tributes ==
The last episode of The Kill Point and the first episode of the sixth season of The Shield were dedicated to Brazil. The Season 5 DVD release of The Shield contains a 25-minute tribute to him from cast and crew members.
