= List of S.W.A.T. (2017 TV series) characters =

This is an overview of the regular, recurring, and other characters of the TV series S.W.A T

== Main characters ==
=== Overview ===
Actor	Character	Position	Seasons								Episodes
Actor	Character	Position	1	2	3	4	5	6	7	8	Episodes
Shemar Moore	Daniel "Hondo" Harrelson	Sergeant II	22	23	21	18	22	22	13	22	163 (All of them)
Jay Harrington	David "Deacon" Kay	Sergeant II	22	23	21	18	20	20	11	20	155
David Lim	Victor Tan	Officer III	21	23	21	18	20	20	11	20	154
Alex Russell	James "Jim" Street	Officer III	22	23	21	18	21	20	1		126
Kenny Johnson	Dominique Luca	Officer III+1	22	23	15	11	20	19	2		112
Lina Esco	Christina "Chris" Alonso	Officer III	22	23	21	18	21				105
Anna Enger Ritch	Zoe Powell	Officer III					2	15	12	22	51
Niko Pepaj	Miguel "Miko" Alfaro	Officer III						4	8	22	34
Annie Ilonzeh	Devin Gamble	Officer III								20	20
Patrick St. Esprit	Robert Hicks	Commander	16	18	17	18	20	20	12	22	143
Stephanie Sigman	Jessica Cortez	Captain	22	22							44
Peter Onorati	Jeffrey Mumford	Sergeant II	14	5		1			1		21
Amy Farrington	Piper Lynch	Lt. Detective			16	5					21
Rochelle Aytes	Nichelle Carmichael	N/A			8	5	6	17	12	1	49
			22	23	21	18	22	22	13	22	163

=== Hondo Harrelson ===
Daniel "Hondo" Harrelson
- S.W.A.T. character
- First appearance: "Pilot"; November 2, 2017
- Portrayed by: Shemar Moore; Donald Dash (teenager)

In-universe information
- Full name: Daniel Harrelson, Jr.
- Gender: Male
- Occupation: Police officer
- Family: Daniel Harrelson, Sr. (father); Charice Harrelson (mother); Winnie Harrelson (older sister); Briana Harrelson (half-sister); Franklin Harrelson (uncle); Andre Harrelson (cousin)
- Significant others: Jessica Cortez (ex-girlfriend); Nia Wells (ex-girlfriend); Genise (ex-girlfriend); Nichelle (ex-wife); Elle Trask (ex-girlfriend)
- Children: Darryl Henderson (foster son); Vivienne (daughter)
- Nationality: American

Police career
- Department: Los Angeles Police Department
- Years of service: 1998–present
- Rank: Sergeant II
- Awards: LAPD Expert Marksmanship Badge

Sergeant II Daniel "Hondo" Harrelson Jr. is a native of South Los Angeles. Hondo was born in 1974 to Daniel Harrelson Sr., and Charice Harrelson; he also has a sister, Winnie. When Hondo was a kid, his father left the family after falling in love with another woman and moved to Oakland, California, where he eventually had another daughter, Briana. Hondo and his dad remained in touch, and Hondo lived with him during the summer in his teenage years.

As a kid, Hondo and two of his best friends, Leroy and Darryl, were part of a gang, but after Darryl's death, Hondo went to Crenshaw High School and eventually joined the force.

After high school, Hondo enlisted in the United States Marine Corps; he served four years (1994 to 1998) with the 1st Battalion, 9th Marines out of Marine Corps Base Camp Pendleton and deployed to Somalia. After his enlistment ended, Hondo joined the Los Angeles Police Department.

Hondo began his Los Angeles Police Department (LAPD) career as a patrol officer with the 77th Street Area. He served as a patrol officer for six years before becoming a member of S.W.A.T. By 2016, he was serving as a Senior Lead Officer on Sergeant Buck Spivey's S.W.A.T. Team. Hondo maintains a good relationship with those in the neighborhood, leading to residents often giving him information on cases.

In 2017, Hondo was unexpectedly promoted to Team Leader after Buck was fired for accidentally shooting an unarmed black teenager during a shootout in a blatant attempt to ease the tensions between the community and the LAPD.

Four months before the series, Hondo began a surreptitious romantic relationship with Captain Jessica Cortez, which, while frowned upon, was not expressly forbidden by LAPD policy; however, after his promotion to Team Leader (which put him directly under her command), the two struggle to keep their relationship secret. Hondo ultimately ends the relationship after they are caught by Commissioner Michael Plank to protect her career. He later starts a relationship with Nia Wells, a Los Angeles County Deputy District Attorney and recent divorcée. The relationship ends due to his anger after an encounter with a racist Arizona Department of Public Safety officer and the inability to prosecute the man who drugged and attempted to rape his sister.

In the third season episode "Track", when Hondo pursues of an armed robbery suspect that leads to a vehicle collision, he meets a woman named Nichelle when he aids a man in an accident. Afterward, Hondo starts dating Nichelle until they break up at the end of the season, when Hondo realizes they are on two different paths in life. They remain friends during the fourth season, and towards the end of the season, they restart their relationship after realizing how happy they make each other. In Season 5, Hondo learns that Nichelle is pregnant with their first child. In the sixth season, at the end of the episode "Whoa Black Betty", 20 Squad reveals to Hondo and Nichelle that they're having a girl. In "Invisible", after failing to secure a good foster family for Darryl Henderson, the teenage son of his friend Leroy, Hondo applies to become Darryl's official foster father.

Hondo becomes disillusioned with the LAPD after they fail to terminate a group of racist police officers despite Deacon having a recording proving their guilt. Disgusted with the LAPD's lack of action, Hondo speaks to the Los Angeles Times about the group, risking his career. Although the racist officers are finally terminated, Hondo is demoted as team leader for going to the press. Hondo then leaves Los Angeles to relocate to a Mexican village to reevaluate his life and career. He helps a family being targeted by an Irish international criminal named Arthur Novak and his son AJ. The two had kidnapped a young girl named Delfina, who is rescued by Hondo and a local cop named Charro. Delfina is brought home to her family, and Hondo returns to Los Angeles to rejoin S.W.A.T. and 20 Squad. With Hondo back on S.W.A.T. and 20 Squad reinstated, new member Rodrigo Sanchez is selected to lead 20 Squad until Luca tells Hondo that the police commissioner hired Sanchez to get Hondo to quit. This plot failed when Luca and Deacon pushed Sanchez into taking a private security job. Hondo was reinstated as leader after Sanchez departed.

Hondo once dated Elle Trask, an FBI Agent. He later dated Nia Wells, an Assistant District Attorney, but later broke up when he had threatened to go after a man, he accused of drugging his younger half-sister, Briana, at a nightclub to possibly take advantage of her. He then went on to dating Nichelle when they first cross paths helping an injured man following a pursuit of armed robbery suspects that Hondo was in. At the end of the fifth season, Hondo learns that Nichelle is pregnant with their first child. She gives birth to their daughter Vivienne in the sixth season and the two marry in-between seasons six and seven.

As a S.W.A.T. officer, Hondo drives a 2015 Dodge Charger Pursuit and carries a Kimber Custom TLE II in .45 ACP as his duty weapon.

His call sign is 20-David.

=== Jessica Cortez ===
Jessica Cortez
- S.W.A.T. character
- First appearance: "Pilot"; November 2, 2017
- Last appearance: "Kangaroo"; May 16, 2019
- Portrayed by: Stephanie Sigman

In-universe information
- Gender: Female
- Title: Captain
- Occupation: Police officer
- Significant other: Hondo Harrelson (ex-boyfriend)
- Nationality: American

Police career
- Department: Los Angeles Police Department
- Rank: Captain

Captain Jessica Cortez is the Commanding Officer of the LAPD Metropolitan Division. She is a respected officer who has plans to improve the relationship between the LAPD and the citizens of Los Angeles, despite some resistance from the rank and file. She is portrayed by Stephanie Sigman.

The daughter of immigrants, Jessica became a naturalized American citizen in her early 20s.

Before the series, Jessica and Hondo were in a romantic relationship; while not expressly forbidden by LAPD policy, Hondo ended it after his promotion to Team Leader, after they were caught by Michael Plank, to protect her career.

She eventually left the LAPD to accept the undercover work for the FBI.

As an LAPD captain, Jessica carried a Glock 19 in 9×19mm as her duty weapon.

=== Jim Street ===
James "Jim" Street
- S.W.A.T. character
- First appearance: "Pilot"; November 2, 2017
- Portrayed by: Alex Russell

In-universe information
- Gender: Male
- Title: Officer III
- Occupation: Police officer
- Family: Karen Street (mother; deceased); Eddie Street (father; deceased)
- Significant others: Molly Hicks (ex-girlfriend); Chris Alonso (girlfriend)
- Relatives: Nate Warren (foster brother; deceased); Ralph Street (uncle)
- Nationality: American

Police career
- Department: Los Angeles Police Department
- Rank: Officer III

Officer James "Jim" Street was the newest member of S.W.A.T. at the start of the series, having transferred from the Long Beach Police Department. He is portrayed by Alex Russell.

When Street was 12, future S.W.A.T. Team Leader Buck Spivey arrested his mother, Karen, for murdering her abusive husband, Street's father. Afterward, Street lived in a foster home alongside his foster brother, Nate Warren, with whom he reconnects in the show. Early on, Street acts as a hotshot cop and a lone wolf, taking dangerous risks, making Hondo question whether he is fit for S.W.A.T. Street continues to visit his mother in prison. However, his mother takes advantage of him, which leads him into more trouble with Hondo. Ultimately, in the season one finale, Street strains his relationship with the team to deal with another crisis involving his mother, which leads to Hondo kicking him off S.W.A.T.

Eventually, after learning that his mother has started using cocaine, Street cuts ties with his mother and moves out of his own house. Afterward, he apologizes to Hondo, stating he was right all along. Hondo accepts his apology and puts him into S.W.A.T. Academy. After weeks at the academy, despite not being chosen at S.W.A.T., Deacon decides to bring Street back for one day before Hicks and Hondo reveal that Street will rejoin S.W.A.T. on a probationary period for six months. Street eventually reports his estranged mother for parole violation and narcotics influence and has no choice but to send her back to prison.

Street dates Molly Hicks, the daughter of his superior, Robert Hicks, for some time. He and Chris begin a relationship at the end of season five.

In the Season 7 episode, "End of the Road", after helping the team stop a group of criminals, Street resigns from 20-Squad and LAPD to join Long Beach's SWAT team, becoming its new commanding officer after its previous leader died from injuries sustained in a gunfight. It is also revealed that Street is engaged to Chris.

His call sign was 26-David.

=== Chris Alonso ===
Christina "Chris" Alonso
- S.W.A.T. character
- First appearance: "Pilot"; November 2, 2017
- Last appearance: "Farewell"; May 22, 2022
- Portrayed by: Lina Esco

In-universe information
- Full name: Christina Alonso
- Gender: Female
- Title: Officer III
- Occupation: Police officer (Resigned)
- Family: Unnamed mother (deceased); Unnamed father
- Significant others: Clark Thompson (ex-boyfriend); Kira (ex-girlfriend); Ty (ex-boyfriend); Jim Street (boyfriend)
- Relatives: Victoria Josie Kay (god daughter); Sarzo (uncle); Tomas (cousin)
- Nationality: American

Police career
- Department: Los Angeles Police Department
- Rank: Officer III

Officer III Christina "Chris" Alonso is the sole female officer in S.W.A.T. Before joining S.W.A.T., she was a dog handler with the Canine Platoon. She is portrayed by Lina Esco.

In "Homecoming", Chris reveals to Street that she is bisexual and later mentions that her large, extended family initially struggled to understand her bisexuality but now embraces it (with one of her younger relatives teasing her about dating both boys and girls).

In "Crews", Chris is asked by Officer Erika Rogers, a S.W.A.T. candidate, to help her prepare for joining the teams. Although she declines to help directly – believing that the only woman in S.W.A.T. helping the only current female S.W.A.T. candidate could ultimately hurt both of them – she does arrange for Street to help her on the course and Luca (who is a member of the S.W.A.T. selection board) to ensure Officer Rogers gets a fair shake from the members.

In "Day Off", when her 12-year-old cousin Tomas was diagnosed with Leukemia, Chris donated her bone marrow to save his life.

In "Patrol", Chris is offered a spot on Sergeant Mumford's team (which would come with a promotion), but she turns him down to remain on Hondo's team.

In "Sea Legs", she reveals that her mother died in a car accident when she was 13.

In "Animus", Chris reveals to Lieutenant Piper Lynch that she was kidnapped and raped by a group of men who thought she was someone else when she was 15. She never reported the incident and did not tell her family until years later. Chris decided to become a cop due to this, but never told her squad about the incident.

Chris enters a polyamorous relationship in the second season but breaks it off later. She is the godmother to Deacon's children. After starting a relationship with Street at the end of the fifth season, she leaves S.W.A.T. and the LAPD to prioritize helping and housing illegal immigrant girls seeking asylum in the United States.

Her call sign was 24-David.

=== Dominique Luca ===
Dominique Luca
- S.W.A.T. character
- First appearance: "Pilot"; November 2, 2017
- Portrayed by: Kenny Johnson

In-universe information
- Full name: Dominique Luca
- Gender: Male
- Title: Officer III+1
- Occupation: Police officer
- Family: Carl Luca (father); Unnamed mother Terry Luca (brother); Eva Durant (half-sister)
- Relatives: Jack Luca (grandfather)
- Nationality: American

Police career
- Department: Los Angeles Police Department
- Rank: Officer III+1

Officer III+1 Dominique Luca was a third-generation S.W.A.T. officer and third-in-command of Hondo's team; his grandfather was on one of the LAPD's first S.W.A.T. Teams in the 1970s. He is portrayed by Kenny Johnson.

Luca drives S.W.A.T.'s primary transport truck, affectionately called "Black Betty." Deacon admits that Luca is a gifted mechanic, as Luca also operates various other S.W.A.T.-related vehicles. Early in season one, Luca is kicked out of his apartment by his girlfriend, and the team is reluctant to take him in, as he is a terrible house-guest despite his friendly and easy-going personality. Street was required to take him as punishment for earlier actions. In "Miracle", Luca mentions that the top of his bucket list is getting a picture with Beyoncé, which he achieved after winning a game of S.W.A.T. tag with Chris.

In "Patrol", Luca reveals that he is dyslexic and wasn't diagnosed as such until he was 14. In "Source", Street is forced to kick Luca out of his apartment to make way for his mother. But, because he doesn't like living alone, Chris gives him a retired K-9 drug dog called Duke as a pet. In "The Tiffany Experience", Luca invites Street to be his roommate again, which he gladly accepts.

He discovers in the sixth season that officer Eva Durrant is his half-sister. In the last few minutes of the Season 7 episode, "Escape", while responding to a call concerning a robbery, Luca is shot, his fate unknown. In "Last Call", Luca is revealed to have survived the shooting; however, he has suffered permanent damage to his hand and arm. Not wanting to be confined to a desk, Luca decides to retire for good from all policing duties: active duty policing, S.W.A.T., and the LAPD.

His call sign was 22-David.

=== Victor Tan ===
Victor Tan
- S.W.A.T. character
- First appearance: "Pilot"; November 2, 2017
- Portrayed by: David Lim

In-universe information
- Full name: Victor Tan
- Gender: Male
- Title: Officer III
- Occupation: Police officer
- Family: Unnamed father (deceased); Fei Tan (mother); Jacob Tan (brother)
- Significant others: Bonnie Lonsdale (ex-wife); Ally (ex-fling)
- Relatives: Unnamed grandfather (deceased); Unnamed sister-in-law (Jacob's wife); Unnamed aunt & uncle (Zee's parents); Zee (cousin; deceased)
- Nationality: American

Police career
- Department: Los Angeles Police Department
- Rank: Officer III

Officer III Victor Tan is a three-year veteran of S.W.A.T., joining after serving with the LAPD Hollywood Division's Vice Squad. He is portrayed by David Lim.

In "Rocket Fuel", it is revealed that he joined the LAPD because of his cousin, who Tan thought was killed in a car accident, but Tan later learned that his cousin had overdosed on PCP.

He married his long-time girlfriend, Bonnie Lonsdale, but in the season six episode "Lion's Share", Tan learns that she has been cheating on him. As a result, their marriage ends; during this time, Tan faces a two-week suspension from S.W.A.T. for getting into a bar fight while drunk.

His call sign was 25-David before taking Luca's call sign as 22-David following the latter's retirement.

=== Jack Mumford ===
Jack Mumford
- S.W.A.T. character
- First appearance: "Pilot"; November 2, 2017
- Last appearance: "Positive Thinking"; March 10, 2021
- Portrayed by: Peter Onorati

In-universe information
- Full name: Jack Mumford
- Gender: Male
- Occupation: Police officer
- Nationality: American

Police career
- Department: Los Angeles Police Department
- Rank: Sergeant II

Sergeant II Jeffrey "Jack" Mumford is another S.W.A.T. Team Leader whose team frequently works alongside Hondo's. He is portrayed by Peter Onorati.

He has been divorced three times; in "Payback", he gets engaged again after only a month-long courtship, and they marry soon after.

In "S.O.S.", he is a S.W.A.T. training instructor alongside Rocker. He retired in "Invisible", leaving command of his team to Sgt. Rocker.

His call sign was 50-David.

=== David "Deacon" Kay ===
David "Deacon" Kay
- S.W.A.T. character
- First appearance: "Pilot"; November 2, 2017
- Portrayed by: Jay Harrington

In-universe information
- Gender: Male
- Occupation: Police officer
- Children: Matthew Kay (son); Lila Kay (daughter); Samuel Kay (son); Victoria Josie Kay (daughter)
- Relatives: Mary Beth (mother-in-law); Cathleen (aunt; deceased); Nicole (sister-in-law)
- Nationality: American

Police career
- Department: Los Angeles Police Department
- Rank: Sergeant II

The senior member of Hondo's team, Sergeant II David "Deacon" Kay has been with S.W.A.T. for 10 years. After Buck was fired, Deacon was passed over for promotion (despite his seniority) in favor of Hondo. He is portrayed by Jay Harrington.

Deacon is the only member of the team to be married and have children; he and his wife, Annie, celebrated their tenth anniversary in 2018. In "Seizure", Annie suffers a stroke and is hospitalized, needing emergency surgery. However, in the next episode, Annie collapses again with a blood clot, and Cortez reaches out to Plank to get a specialist to save her life. In the season one finale, Deacon and Annie renew their vows with their friends present. Deacon takes extra time off to take care of the kids so Annie can pursue her original career in law; however, Annie reveals that she is pregnant again.

In season 2, Deacon struggles financially and begins a second job as a security consultant for one of Hondo's friends. Luca notices his struggles with money and gives him money to help the family. Deacon reaches a breaking point after his newborn daughter, Victoria Josie Kay, is diagnosed with a heart condition, and he cannot pay for the operation to fix it. He reaches out to a former loan shark that he once arrested to pay for the procedure. Deacon crashes into a truck to prevent it from hitting civilians, injuring him and requiring him to go to rehab, adding stress to the situation.

In "Cash Flow", Deacon is offered command of Sgt. Mumford's team after Mumford announced his retirement, but Deacon withdrew his name for consideration after taking money from a crime scene temporarily.

In Season 7, Deacon starts to see his work life conflict with his family life, leading him and Annie to have disagreements over when he is needed most. After some soul-searching and advice from Hondo and Hicks, Deacon makes the tough decision to retire in order to spend more time with his family and allow Annie to pursue her dreams of becoming an attorney. However, he soon re-evaluates his decision following Luca's shooting and subsequent retirement and 20-Squad's staffing crisis, and eventually reverses his choice after Annie's sister Nicole moves in following her divorce to help with the children.

One of his four children, Lila, is named after a school shooting victim from 2013.

His call sign is 30-David.

=== Robert Hicks ===
Robert "Bob" Hicks
- S.W.A.T. character
- First appearance: "Pilot"; November 2, 2017
- Portrayed by: Patrick St. Esprit

In-universe information
- Full name: Robert Hicks
- Gender: Male
- Title: S.W.A.T. Commander
- Occupation: Police officer
- Spouses: Barbara Hicks (wife; 1995–2015; deceased)
- Children: John Paul "J.P." Hicks (son); Molly Hicks (daughter)
- Nationality: American

Police career
- Department: Los Angeles Police Department
- Rank: Commander

The LAPD Special Operations Bureau Executive Officer, Commander Robert Hicks, is the direct superior and mentor of Captain Jessica Cortez. In 2017, he fired Sergeant Buck Spivey after Spivey accidentally shot an unarmed black teenager during a shootout and appointed Hondo as his replacement over senior team member Sergeant Deacon Kay in a blatant attempt to ease the tensions between the community and the LAPD. He is portrayed by Patrick St. Esprit.

Hicks is a widower; his wife Barbara died due to Alzheimer's disease three years before "Seizure". The couple were close friends with the Kay family; Barbara had taught Deacon's wife, Annie, how to be a S.W.A.T. wife. He and Barbara have two children: Molly, an attorney who lives in Pittsburgh, and John-Paul, or J.P., a gay rights protester and drug user from whom Hicks has been estranged for most of his life, which worsened after Barbara's death.

As a senior officer within the LAPD, Hicks carries a Kimber Custom TLE II in .45 ACP as his duty weapon.

St. Esprit was promoted to a series regular for season 2.

=== Piper Lynch ===
Detective Lieutenant Piper Lynch is from the LAPD Hollywood Division. The mayor appointed her as a tactical consultant to S.W.A.T. Despite being a challenge to the team's usual strategies in the field and not being a S.W.A.T. officer, she is an experienced detective, having contacts around Los Angeles. She is portrayed by Amy Farrington.

=== Nichelle Carmichael ===
Nichelle Carmichael is Hondo's love interest, introduced in season three. They break up towards the end of the season when Hondo realizes they are on two different paths in life. They remain friends during the fourth season, and he helps at the community center where she works whenever possible. Towards the end of the fourth season, they restart their relationship after realizing how happy they make each other. They eventually have a daughter, Vivienne, and become engaged during the late part of the sixth season. She is portrayed by Rochelle Aytes.

=== Zoe Powell ===
Zoe Powell is a police officer in the Los Angeles Police Department. She first appears during a S.W.A.T. Academy session. She later passes the selection and became member of S.W.A.T. Her lone wolf instinct reminds Street of himself back when he first joined Hondo's team but he uses his past experience and mistakes to help her trust and rely on her teammates more often. Her obscure past includes her husband having cheated on her twice and her having had a son at fifteen named Thomas, whom she meets for the first time in the seventh season. She proves herself a good voice of reason when providing advice to her teammates and an effective and fierce opponent in the battlefield. She is portrayed by Anna Enger Ritch.

Her call sign was 28-David before it changed to 24-David, Chris Alonso's former call sign.

=== Miguel "Miko" Alfaro ===
Miguel "Miko" Alfaro is a police officer in the Los Angeles Police Department. Formerly from Long Beach and an old S.W.A.T. rival of Street, he transfers to LAPD, and joins S.W.A.T. from there onwards, taking Dominique Luca's spot as the competitive and humorous member of the 20-Squad. In the eighth season, he gains the nickname "Miko" from an Albanian named Zora after rescuing her "Bubu" from pawnshop robbers (in the season premiere, "Vanished"). He also starts a relationship with Deacon's sister-in-law Nicole. He is portrayed by Niko Pepaj.

His call sign is 25-David.

=== Devin Gamble ===
Devin Gamble, formerly with Oakland SWAT, is the newest member in the 20-Squad under the leadership of Sergeant Hondo Harrelson. In spite of getting the cold shoulder from numerous of her colleagues within the LAPD and Internal Affairs due to her family being composed of criminals, she has earned the respect of Hondo and the rest of 20-Squad and proves to everyone around her that she is not the same as her brothers and father, the latter of whom is serving a life sentence for murdering a Sheriff's Deputy. She is portrayed by Annie Ilonzeh.

Her call sign is 26-David, which used to be Jim Street's call sign before he returned to Long Beach Police Department.

== Recurring characters ==
=== Overview ===
Actor	Character	Seasons							
Actor	Character	1	2	3	4	5	6	7	8
Lou Ferrigno Jr.	Sergeant Donovan Rocker	Recurring	Recurring	Recurring	Recurring	Guest	Guest	Guest	Guest
Louis Ferreira	Sgt. William "Buck" Spivey	Guest	Guest	Recurring				Guest	
Sherilyn Fenn	Karen Street	Recurring	Guest		Guest				
Bre Blair	Annie Kay	Recurring	Recurring	Guest	Recurring	Guest	Guest	Guest	Guest
Peter Facinelli	Michael Plank	Recurring							
Deshae Frost	Darryl Henderson	Guest	Recurring	Recurring	Recurring				
Michael Beach	Leroy Henderson	Guest	Guest		Recurring	Guest		Guest	
Cathy Cahlin Ryan	Dr. Wendy Hughes	Guest	Guest	Recurring	Guest	Guest	Guest	Guest	Guest
Obba Babatundé	Daniel Harrelson Sr.	Guest	Guest	Recurring	Recurring	Recurring	Guest	Guest	Guest
Lyndie Greenwood	Officer Erika Rogers	Guest			Recurring				
Otis Gallop	Sergeant Stevens	Guest	Recurring	Recurring	Recurring	Guest	Recurring	Recurring	Recurring
David Rees Snell	Detective John Burrows	Guest	Guest	Guest	Guest	Recurring	Guest	Recurring	Guest
Nikiva Dionne	Nia Wells		Recurring	Guest			Guest		
Juan Javier Cardenas	Beni		Recurring						
Debbie Allen	Charice Harrelson		Recurring	Guest		Guest	Guest		
Daniel Lissing	Ty		Recurring	Guest					
Laura James	Molly Hicks		Guest	Recurring	Guest				Guest
Michael Marc Friedman	Sergeant Becker			Recurring		Guest			
Cory Hardrict	Nate Warren			Recurring					
Adam Aalderks	Officer Lee Durham				Recurring				
Norma Kuhling	Officer Nora Fowler				Guest	Recurring			
David DeSantos	Sergeant Rodrigo Sanchez					Recurring	Guest		
Brigitte Kali Canales	Officer Alexis Cabrera					Guest	Recurring	Recurring	Guest
Kelly Overton	Officer Eva Durant						Recurring		
Emerson Brooks	Deputy Alex Doberstein								Recurring
Merrin Dungey	Deputy Chief Bennett								Recurring
Freddy D. Ramsey Jr	Andre Harrelson								Recurring

=== Other S.W.A.T. Members ===
==== Buck Spivey ====
Sergeant II William "Buck" Spivey is a former LAPD S.W.A.T. Team Leader. He is portrayed by Louis Ferreira.

In 2017, he was fired for accidentally shooting an unarmed black teenager. It is revealed when Street was 12, future S.W.A.T. Team Leader Buck Spivey arrested his mother, Buck asks Hondo to guide him. After being fired he joins a security firm, which he encourages Deacon to join in, as they want him over Buck to be the face of their company. Buck becomes a cause for concern, amongst his former team, becoming a recluse and not attending events that he is invited to. In the third-season episode "Stigma", he deteriorates to the point he attempts to commit suicide at a lake, but his former 20 Squad members find him and reach out to him and help by talking him down about how much of an impact he has on all of their lives and how hurt they would be if he went through with it. At the end of the episode, Dr. Wendy reveals that Buck is now getting counseling.

==== Donovan Rocker ====
Sergeant II Donovan Rocker is a S.W.A.T. officer from Mumford's S.W.A.T. team and a S.W.A.T. training instructor. He is portrayed by Lou Ferrigno Jr.

In "Invisible", Sgt. Rocker took command of the retiring Sgt. Mumford's team.

==== Sgt. Stevens ====
Sergeant I Stevens is a veteran S.W.A.T. member. He is portrayed by real-life San Diego Police S.W.A.T. officer Otis Gallop, who also serves as the show's technical advisor.

==== Beni ====
Officer Beni is a S.W.A.T. officer who temporarily filled in for Street. He is portrayed by Juan Javier Cardenas.

==== Erika Rogers ====
Officer III Erika Rogers is a newly recruited S.W.A.T. officer assigned to Rocker's 50-David squad. She was killed after being involved in a shootout with a suspect. She is portrayed by Lyndie Greenwood.

==== Wendy Hughes ====
Dr. Wendy Hughes is a psychologist who regularly assists the S.W.A.T. unit. She is portrayed by Cathy Cahlin Ryan. Ryan previously starred on The Shield, also created by her husband, Shawn Ryan.

==== Nora Fowler ====
Officer Nora Fowler is the newly created Tactical Emergency Medical Support Officer for S.W.A.T. Hicks assigns her to 20-David as an experiment to minimize wait time for medical personnel in the field, though Hondo was against the idea because the team was still reeling from Erika Rogers' death. Formerly an Army Combat Medic in Afghanistan, EMT with LAFD, and certified in mountain and deep water rescue, Fowler proved herself as an asset to the team in trying to save a kidnapped victim’s life, despite Hondo's orders. However, the two later came to an understanding at the end of the episode. She is portrayed by Norma Kuhling.

==== Lee Durham ====
Lee Durham is a member of S.W.A.T. that sometimes works with Hondo's team. Deacon, initially views him as a protégé and they get friendly, until Deacon notes his use of code words and extremist reading material. He is later introduced alongside two other like-minded cops, who Deacon knew prior to SWAT, recording their comments, later reporting them to Internal Affairs exposing Durham's racist views. A confrontation happens at SWAT HQ which Durham threatens that their union will fight their case and Deacon will be a pariah. He was fired from the LAPD after Hondo released a statement to the LA Times. He is portrayed by Adam Aalderks.

==== Rodrigo Sanchez ====
Rodrigo Sanchez is the new leader of 20 Squad, tasked with making Hondo quit. He later retired from the LAPD to work in security. Hondo and the rest of 20 Squad reencounter him in "Sequel", when an intruder targets a Hollywood actress. Sanchez now in the private security business works with Hondo and 20 Squad to help catch the perpetrator. He and Deacon go into business together. He is portrayed by David DeSantos.

==== Alexis Cabrera ====
Officer Alexis Cabrera is a newly recruited member of S.W.A.T. Her first assignment with 20 Squad occurred when Chris took time off, and when Chris left, Cabrera remained with the team. She is portrayed by Brigitte Kali Canales.

=== Friends and family of the S.W.A.T. team ===
==== Daniel Harrelson, Sr. ====
Daniel Harrelson Sr. is Hondo's father. He is portrayed by Obba Babatundé.

==== Charice Harrelson ====
Charice Harrelson is Hondo's mother. She is portrayed by Debbie Allen.

==== Briana Harrelson ====
Briana Harrelson is Hondo's half-sister. She is portrayed by Gabrielle Dennis.

==== Winnie Harrelson ====
Winnie Harrelson is Hondo's older sister. She is portrayed by April Parker Jones.

==== Andre Harrelson ====
Andre Harrelson is Hondo's cousin who comes to visit him in "The Heights". He is portrayed by Freddy D. Ramsey Jr.

==== Darryl Henderson ====
Darryl Henderson is the son of Hondo's best friend. Darryl spent time in juvenile detention. He later lives with Hondo, and in "Invisible", Hondo reveals that he will apply to become Darryl's legal guardian. He is portrayed by Deshae Frost.

==== Leroy Henderson ====
Leroy Henderson is Hondo's childhood friend and father of Darryl Henderson. He was incarcerated in California State Prison from seasons one to three and was released on parole in season four. When Daryl is shot by a drug addict he has gang affiliates look for the shooter, though Hondo intervenes and arrests the culprit. In season 4 Hondo does not help him obtain parole by vouching for him as reformed, Leroy in turn accuses Hondo of attempting to remove him from his sons life. He is paroled anyway, to Hondo's dismay and becomes a partner in his sons venture. Despite their animosity he helps Hondo by ensuring young gang members are not drawn into a race riot caused by a group of supremacists who were involved in the death SWAT officer Erika Rogers He is portrayed by Michael Beach.

==== Nia Wells ====
Nia Wells is LA's Deputy District Attorney and Hondo's love interest, introduced in season two, though they later end their relationship. Nia briefly returns in season three and intends to get back together with Hondo, who rejects her. As of season six, she is an Assistant District Attorney. She is portrayed by Nikiva Dionne.

==== Annie Kay ====
Annie Kay is Deacon's wife with whom he's been married for seventeen years as of the end of the final season and the mother of his four children. She is portrayed by Bre Blair.

==== Lila Kay ====
Lila Kay is Deacon and Annie Kay's daughter. She is named after a school shooting victim of Riverhill High School in early January 2013 who helped Deacon catch the shooters. She is portrayed by Amanda Lowe-Oadell.

==== Matthew Kay ====
Matthew Kay is Deacon and Annie Kay's eldest child and son. He was portrayed by Stefan E. Clark as a young child in the first three seasons and is currently portrayed by Colin O'Brien as of the sixth season.

==== Nicole ====
Nicole is Annie Kay's sister who moves in with Annie and her husband Deacon at the end of the seventh season and becomes the babysitter of their four kids, allowing Deacon and Annie to continue their careers in S.W.A.T. and law respectively. She makes her debut appearance in "Hot Button" and begins an affair with Deacon's teammate, Miguel Alfaro. She is portrayed by Tory Trowbridge.

==== Carl Luca ====
Sergeant I Carl Luca is a veteran of LAPD S.W.A.T. He is the father of Officer III+1 Dominique Luca and the son of the late Jack Luca, one of the first S.W.A.T. officers within the LAPD. Season 6 reveals that he had an affair with another officer and conceived a daughter Eva. He is portrayed by Michael O'Neill.

==== Eva Durant ====
Eva Durant is a LAPD officer who is the younger half-sister of Dominique Luca being the illegitimate daughter of Carl Luca. She appears in the sixth season, where she reveals to Luca of their status and stated she wanted to make a connection.

==== Karen Street ====
Karen Street was Jim Street's estranged mother. She was in prison for killing her abusive husband, Street's father, before being released on parole after 18 years of incarceration.

In "Saving Face", after Street finds drugs in her purse, he loses his loyalty and permanently severs his ties with her. In "Kangaroo", Street finds her using drugs again and reports her to her parole officer, eventually sending her back to prison. She died off-screen due to a drug overdose in "Sentinel". She is portrayed by Sherilyn Fenn.

==== Molly Hicks ====
Molly Hicks is Robert Hicks' daughter, who works as a pro-bono lawyer. She serves as Street's love interest for some time. Near the end of the eighth season, she is revealed to be dating her father's subordinate, Donovan Rocker. She is portrayed by Laura James.

==== Nate Warren ====
Nate Warren is Jim Street's foster brother. Nate is murdered in the episode "Good Cop" by crime boss Teague Nolan in retaliation for Street arresting Nolan. He is portrayed by Cory Hardrict.

==== Terry Luca ====
Terry Luca is Dominique Luca's brother. He is portrayed by Ryan Hurst.

=== Other characters ===
==== Michael Plank ====
Michael Plank is the president of the Los Angeles Board of Police Commissioners. He works with Captain Cortez on various initiatives designed to improve relations between the LAPD and the community. Commissioner Plank also serves on the Los Angeles Board of Education. He is portrayed by Peter Facinelli.

In "Hoax", Michael steps down from the Police Commission in order to run for Governor of California.

==== Raymont Harris ====
Raymont Harris is the teenager that Buck accidentally shot. Hondo maintains contact with Harris after the incident. During Season 1 his mother confides in Hondo he has obtained a firearm. Hondo on Buck's behalf reaches out to him encouraging him to meet buck so they can both heal. He is portrayed by Aaron Bledsoe.

==== Tony Larmen ====
Officer Tony Larmen is Street's patrol partner. He is played by Joseph Lee Anderson.

==== Mayor Barrett ====
Mayor Barrett, the mayor of Los Angeles, is played by Bess Armstrong.

==== Strickland ====
Officer Strickland is an officer from Long Beach PD. He is played by Sean Riggs.

== Guest ==
- Dominic Hoffman as Ben Mosley, a former LAPD narcotics detective
- Larry Poindexter as Sergeant Nick Boyer. Poindexter previously starred in S.W.A.T. as Captain Fuller.
- David Marciano as Steve Billings. Marciano reprises his role from The Shield, also created by Shawn Ryan.
- Angelica Scarlett Johnson as Kelly Stewart, a dyslexic girl whom Luca took under his wing
- Steve Villegas as Marcos, a street gangster with whom Luca sometimes butts heads
- Lissa Pallo as Detective Ferris
- Miraj Grbić as Melvin
- Karissa Lee Staples as Bonnie, Tan's girlfriend/later ex-wife
- Jackson Hurst as Organised Crime Sergeant Ben Sikora
- Bailey Chase as Owen Bennett
- Carlo Arrechea as Gio Torres, a Cuban middleweight boxer who's in the States with his pregnant wife, Esther, for what could be the fight of his life.
- Robert Cicchini as Mark
- Nitya Vidyasagar as Sergeant Wilson
- Steven Bauer as Sancho Zamora, a powerful and violent Mexican drug lord, head of the Zamora Cartel (a powerful Mexican drug cartel) and one of Hondo's archenemies.
- Jessica Camacho as FBI Special Agent Jackie Vasquez
