= Send Help (soundtrack) =

Send Help (Original Motion Picture Soundtrack)

Film score by Danny Elfman
- Released: January 30, 2026
- Recorded: 2025
- Studio: Simon Leadley Scoring Stage, Trackdown Studios, Sydney; Sound Wave, Santa Barbara, California
- Genre: Film score
- Length: 47:58
- Label: Hollywood
- Producer: Danny Elfman

Danny Elfman chronology
Dead Man's Wire (2025)	Send Help (2026)

Send Help (Original Motion Picture Soundtrack) is the film score composed by Danny Elfman to the 2026 film Send Help directed by Sam Raimi starring Rachel McAdams and Dylan O'Brien. The soundtrack featuring 23 tracks of Elfman's score was released through Hollywood Records on January 30, 2026.

== Development ==
The film score is composed by Danny Elfman continuing his three-decade long-standing association with Sam Raimi for the eighth time. Elfman accepted the film without even knowing about it, primarily due to his working relationship wih Raimi. Elfman added that Raimi likes to describe on what his characters think and do, and in this film, while it had Raimi's trademark horror elements, it also included multiple genres such as action, adventure and romance, all set within the world.

For Linda's theme, Elfman wanted to find a sound that would reflect his character's transformation. Firstly he wanted an innocent theme for the character, thereby using a female voice, taking inspiration from Rosemary's Baby (1968). But later, Elfman wanted to add a dark and sinister quality to the same voice, which was the twisted version of the main theme as things get much intense by the end. The score further emphaszies use of orchestral elements.

== Release ==
The soundtrack to Send Help was released by Hollywood Records on January 30, 2026, the same day as the film's release.

== Reception ==
Critic based at Filmtracks considered the score to be a "creative blast of Elfman's personality from across the musical spectrum in an unlikely place" and the main title theme being an "absolute winner". James Southall of Movie Wave added that Send Help admittedly sees Elfman "exploring familiar territory" but considered it to be satisfying with the composer revisiting ground from four decades, calling it an "absolute blast". Jonathan Broxton of Movie Music UK had "enough of Elfman's signature sound in the score to satisfy long-time fans, and enough new material to ensure it still sounds impressively fresh." Jeanette Catsoulis of The New York Times called it a "cheeky" score.

Sean Rinn of SLUG wrote "Danny Elfman's quirky score that accents the atmosphere without overtaking the scene". Amelia Emberwing of TheWrap wrote "unsurprisingly great score" which added an impressive depth to McAdams' acting and character depth. Louis Peitzman of Vulture called Elfman's score, a throwback to the 1990s horror films. Odie Henderson of The Boston Globe said that Elfman's "bouncy score" convinced the critic that "the movie was indeed listening". Chris Bumbray of JoBlo.com called it an "engaging" score from Elfman "whose strings and stings punctuate moments of pure insanity with manic precision".

Aidan Kelley of Collider wrote "Danny Elfman's score is distracting and out-of-place." Tom Jorgensen of IGN wrote "Frequent Raimi collaborator Danny Elfman's score also doesn't leave much of an impression, serviceably punctuating the big moments but otherwise feeling a lot more nondescript than you may expect, especially given the bombastic heights the film reaches by the end". Meagan Navarro of Bloody Disgusting wrote "Danny Elfman's score is oddly muted".

== Track listing ==
No.	Title	Length
1.	"Linda at Home"	2:00
2.	"Linda Shamed"	1:00
3.	"Underwater"	1:05
4.	"Alone"	1:47
5.	"Building Shelter"	1:26
6.	"Waiting to Die"	3:06
7.	"The Hunt"	2:17
8.	"The Waterfall"	1:31
9.	"Hiking Together"	2:33
10.	"Toilet Wine"	1:24
11.	"Cuddle Cave"	0:57
12.	"Getting Along"	2:01
13.	"Poison Raft"	2:27
14.	"Castration"	2:42
15.	"Sick Day"	1:37
16.	"Linda's Nightmare"	2:05
17.	"Diamond Ring"	1:31
18.	"Jungle Fight"	3:50
19.	"Home Invasion"	3:08
20.	"Strategy and Planning"	3:12
21.	"Saving Yourself"	1:15
22.	"End Credits"	3:05
23.	"Bonus Track"	1:59
Total length:		47:58

== Personnel ==
Credits adapted from Film Music Reporter:

- Music composer and producer: Danny Elfman
- Music editor: Bill Abbott, Ellen Segal
- Additional music editor: Denise Okimoto
- Performer: Sydney Scoring Orchestra
- Conductor: Pete Anthony
- Orchestrator: Steve Bartek, Dave Slonaker, Tutti Music Partners
- Recording: Noah Snyder (The Simon Leadley Scoring Stage, Trackdown Studios)
- Mixing: Dennis S. Sands (Sound Wave SB)
- Mixing assistant: Adam Olsted
- MIDI preparation: Marc Mann
- MIDI conformation: David Glen Russell
- Score coordinator: Melisa McGregor
- Musical assistant: Melissa Karaban
- Technical assistant: Matthew Thomas
- Assistant engineers: Craig Beckett, Jayden Whitebread, Isaac Ross
- Pro-tools operator: Liam Moses
- Music preparation: Fine Line Music Service
- Music librarians: Josef Zimmerman, Max Fourmy
- Music preparation supervisors: Gregory Jamrok, Abraham Libbos
- Music preparation for Trackdown Studios: Meggan Quinn, Carolyn Burke
- Music production coordinator: Elaine Beckett
- Orchestra contractor: Alex Henery
- Choir contractor: Elizabeth Scott
- Choir conductor: Christopher Gordon
- Solo vocalist: Holly Sedillos
