= The Juice Is Loose =

- Family Guy episode
- Episode no.: Season 7 Episode 9
- Directed by: Cyndi Tang
- Written by: Andrew Goldberg
- Production code: 6ACX13
- Original air date: March 15, 2009

Guest appearances
- Cathy Cahlin Ryan as Patti Goldman; Jeff Bergman as Homer Simpson

Episode chronology
← Previous "Family Gay"	Next → "FOX-y Lady"
- Family Guy season 7

"The Juice Is Loose" is the ninth episode of the seventh season of the American animated television series Family Guy. It originally aired on Fox in the United States on March 15, 2009. In the episode, Peter cashes in an old raffle ticket from 1989 and wins a golf outing with O. J. Simpson. When he befriends Simpson and brings him home to meet the family, the residents of Quahog are not as welcoming of Peter's new friend and try to force him out of town.

The episode was written by Andrew Goldberg and directed by Cyndi Tang. According to Nielsen ratings, the episode was viewed in 7.21 million homes in its original airing. The episode received mixed reviews, with most criticism being directed towards the episode's use of a three-minute-long live-action segment of Conway Twitty. Series regular Mike Henry provided the voice of O. J. Simpson, Cathy Cahlin Ryan guest-starred as Fred Goldman's wife in a cutaway, and Jeff Bergman guest-starred as a parody of Homer Simpson.

== Plot ==
According to an opening title card, this is one of several recently discovered "lost episodes" found in the Griffin family basement; it takes place in March 2007, prior to O. J. Simpson's September 2007 arrest for armed robbery.

Lois goes to her book club and asks Peter to babysit Stewie. Instead, he invites Cleveland, Quagmire, and Joe and they all play Truth or Dare, which results in a make out session between Cleveland and Joe. After a fiasco involving Stewie attempting to fix their satellite TV, and getting stuck on the roof, due to Peter's lack of supervision, Brian tries to tell Peter but he does not listen and instead reads a magazine featuring Nick Jonas. After Peter starts a pillow fight that turns violent, Lois comes in after Cleveland accidentally punches her in the nose, angry at Peter for not watching Stewie, who has gotten stuck on the roof as Peter tells the viewers with the “Ladies and Gentlemen Mr Conway Twitty” gag then later transitions back to Peter attempts to fix the satellite himself, at which point he comes across a raffle ticket from 1989 that he had forgotten to cash in, winning him a chance to play golf with a celebrity of his choice. Ultimately, he chooses O. J. Simpson.

Unaware at first of Simpson's accusation for the murders of his wife Nicole Brown Simpson and her friend Ron Goldman, he grows fearful after Joe convinces him to walk around town with the song "Dust in the Wind" while thinking about the murders. Ultimately deciding to cash in the ticket, his friends suggest he spy on Simpson during the golf game and try to get him to confess to the murders. Hooking Peter to a wire, his cover is blown when the device shorts out. Simpson laments having lost a chance of escaping the accusation. Feeling guilty, Peter decides that Simpson is actually innocent, and decides to befriend him.

Peter brings Simpson home with him to meet the family, who are initially less tolerant of Simpson than Peter (except Stewie). Brian tries to tell Peter that he should not trust Simpson just because he idolized him as a child but Peter refuses.

Deciding to let Simpson stay at their house, word soon gets out of Simpson's presence in Quahog, causing Peter to decide to throw a house party and help everyone else get to know him better. Later that day, Peter and Simpson are met with an angry mob instead led by Mayor Adam West, intent on driving the latter out of town. Desperate for a place to live without being bothered by furious citizens, Simpson makes a heartfelt speech, professing that he is just as imperfect as everyone else, causing the residents of Quahog to apologize and embrace with him. A split second later, however, the tables turn to a surprise ending as Simpson takes out a knife and kills three people before running off. A furious mob goes on to chase after Simpson, as the Griffins look on, with Peter, wearing a guilty disappointed look, indifferently declaring, "I guess he did do it."

== Production ==
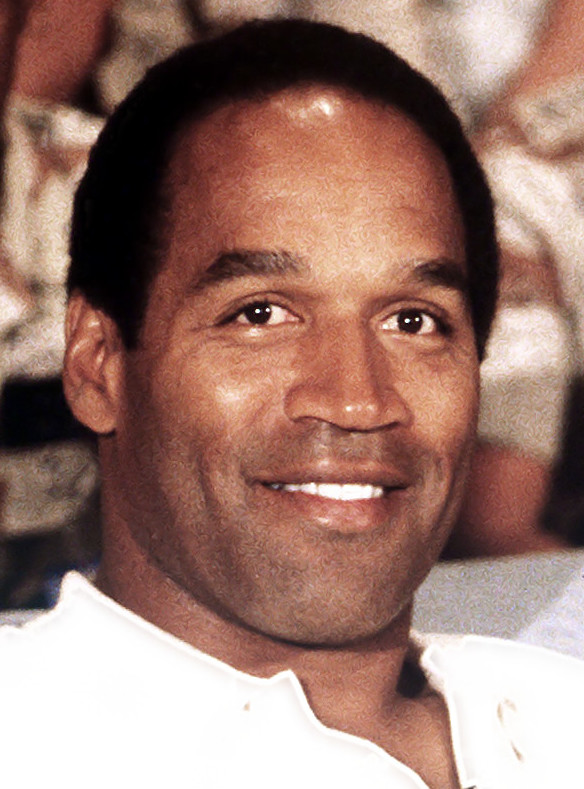
O. J. Simpson was sentenced to 33 years' imprisonment in 2008 for his involvement in a robbery.

"The Juice Is Loose" was written by Andrew Goldberg and directed by Cyndi Tang. The writing process began when Goldberg was creator Seth MacFarlane's assistant and was given a freelance episode. He wrote "Believe It or Not, Joe's Walking on Air", and executive producer David A. Goodman thought he did a "fantastic job". Goldberg submitted a three-page list of ideas for his next episode, and MacFarlane especially liked the story for "The Juice Is Loose". They had to add a title card in the beginning of the episode saying that it was a "lost episode", as O. J. Simpson was sent to jail before the episode aired. The episode features a three-minute-long segment of an archive video of Conway Twitty performing "I See the Want To in Your Eyes", and executive producer Chris Sheridan had to explain to the Fox executives why the segment should be featured in the episode.

Series regular Mike Henry provided the voice of O. J. Simpson in the episode, and Cathy Cahlin Ryan guest-starred as Fred Goldman's wife in a cutaway gag. In addition to Henry and Ryan, actors Reid Bruton, Jules Green, Augie Castagnola, Virenia Lind guest-starred in the episode. Recurring voice actors Jeff Bergman, Max Burkholder, Ralph Garman, writer Danny Smith, writer Alec Sulkin, and writer John Viener made minor appearances in the episode.

== Reception ==
In its original airing on March 15, 2009, "The Juice is Loose" was watched by 7.21 million households and acquired a 3.6 rating in the 18–49 demographic. It was the most-watched show in the "Animation Domination" block, surpassing The Simpsons, American Dad! and King of the Hill. The episode received mixed reviews from television sources and critics. Ahsan Haque of IGN gave "The Juice Is Loose" 5.5/10, saying that the episode was "a largely forgettable episode with only a few moments of brilliance". The review criticized the usage of a three-minute-long Conway Twitty live-action singing clip which was received as an "effort to reduce the amount of animation ... for the episode". Alex Rocha of TV Guide said that he "did enjoy this episode" but called the Conway Twitty clip a "filler" and that he would have wanted to see a "blank screen or even commercials" instead. Steve Heisler of The A.V. Club stated that the episode "relied on an overabundance of pop culture riffs far too dated to elicit much more than a brief chuckle", and also criticized the Conway Twitty clip. He graded "The Juice Is Loose" a C+.
