= Excellence in Broadcasting =

- Family Guy episode
- Episode no.: Season 9 Episode 2
- Directed by: John Holmquist
- Written by: Patrick Meighan
- Production code: 8ACX03
- Original air date: October 3, 2010

Guest appearances
- Rush Limbaugh as himself; Gary Cole as Mike Brady; Christine Lakin as Joyce Kinney; Shelley Long as Carol Brady; Nana Visitor as Nancy Pelosi; Rainn Wilson as Dwight Schrute

Episode chronology
← Previous "And Then There Were Fewer"	Next → "Welcome Back, Carter"
- Family Guy season 9

"Excellence in Broadcasting" is the second episode of the ninth season of the animated comedy series Family Guy. It originally aired on Fox in the United States on October 3, 2010. The episode features anthropomorphic dog Brian, an adamant liberal, confronting conservative radio talk show host Rush Limbaugh at a book signing in Quahog, and ultimately having a political change of heart when Limbaugh persuades him to read his latest book. Brian soon decides to become a devoted member of the Republican Party, and soon begins criticizing liberals. This leads Brian to become roommates with Limbaugh, and begin following him everywhere; Limbaugh eventually gets annoyed and ends up disclosing Brian's true political convictions.

The episode was written by Patrick Meighan and directed by John Holmquist. It received mixed reviews from critics for its storyline and many cultural references, in addition to receiving both praise and criticism from conservative news outlets. According to Nielsen ratings, it was viewed in 7.94 million homes in its original airing. As well as Limbaugh, the episode featured guest performances by Gary Cole, Christine Lakin, Phil LaMarr, Shelley Long, Nana Visitor and Rainn Wilson, along with several recurring guest voice actors for the series. "Excellence in Broadcasting" was released on DVD along with three other episodes from the season on December 13, 2011.

== Plot ==
In light of the "previous episode", the Griffins are watching the news—where Tom Tucker casually reveals that Diane Simmons committed the murders at James Woods' mansion and is now dead. Free of the false charges she tried to frame him for, he then introduces Diane's successor: Joyce Kinney.

As Lois reads the newspaper, she discovers that conservative radio talk show host Rush Limbaugh is holding a book signing in Quahog. Chris is confused as he thought Rush Limbaugh was secretly Fred Savage, which Lois herself reported when she worked for Fox in "Fox-y Lady" only for Lois to explain that anything reported on Fox News either is or becomes a lie, even if it's the truth. Enraged, Brian, who despises Limbaugh over his political beliefs, decides to confront him at the signing. There, Limbaugh is criticized by Brian, but he counters by asking him whether he has read any of his books, leaving Brian dumbfounded and angry. As he curses Limbaugh to himself on his way home, Brian is mugged by a gang; Limbaugh abruptly shows up and beats them all to rescue Brian. Thankful, Brian agrees to read four pages of Limbaugh's book. This he does, but Brian grows interested enough to continue reading the book overnight. By then, he becomes a conservative Republican. Lois questions Brian's conviction, citing his past liberalism, while Brian defends his ability to change his mind based on new information. Lois points out that Brian purposefully disagrees with the general consensus on many things just so he can feel like "the smartest guy in the room" and accuses him of being a contrarian rather than a genuine believer; for example, he hated Titanic and Slumdog Millionaire but defends the movie Cocktail. Brian meets with Limbaugh to thank him for helping his political conversion, and the two travel to the Republican National Headquarters, where they are greeted by former President of the United States George W. Bush and United States Senator John McCain.

Returning home, Lois is unimpressed when Brian tells her that Limbaugh will be coming over for dinner. That night, Lois begins arguing and challenging Limbaugh politically—with Peter joining in as well. She then accuses Limbaugh of brainwashing Brian, and demands that their dog go back to the way he used to be. Limbaugh insists Brian became a conservative on his own terms, and the two sing a number based on "The Company Way", "Republican Town". Brian, outraged by Lois's unsupportive behavior, decides to move out and become roommates with Limbaugh—who reluctantly allows him to move into his house. Brian soon begins to irritate Limbaugh with his blind devotion. He replaces many of Limbaugh's possessions with American-Made versions, which all go wrong. Brian then proceeds to follow Limbaugh to his radio show, where he attempts to voice his own political opinions on the air about Speaker of the House Nancy Pelosi. This frustrates Limbaugh, who ends up having Brian thrown out. Despite this, Brian continues to try and prove his devotion to the conservative cause by waterboarding Pelosi—only to end up getting apprehended and sent to jail.

Later on, Limbaugh bails out Brian, but he grows annoyed when Brian again tries to assert his conservatism. This prompts Limbaugh to tell Brian he is only fighting against the Establishment due to his desire of being the underdog. He proves his point by telling Brian that a child was executed in Texas, causing Brian to be visibly horrified; Limbaugh then says that he made up the story, but Brian's honest reaction to it shows he is a liberal at heart. Reassuring Brian of his liberal convictions, Limbaugh leaves the jail, making a Grapes of Wrath-like pledge to "be around" wherever conservative causes need help. Outside, they heckle each other with reassurance before waving goodbye to the other. The episode ends with Brian watching Limbaugh transform into a bald eagle and subsequently flying away into the skyline.

== Production and development ==
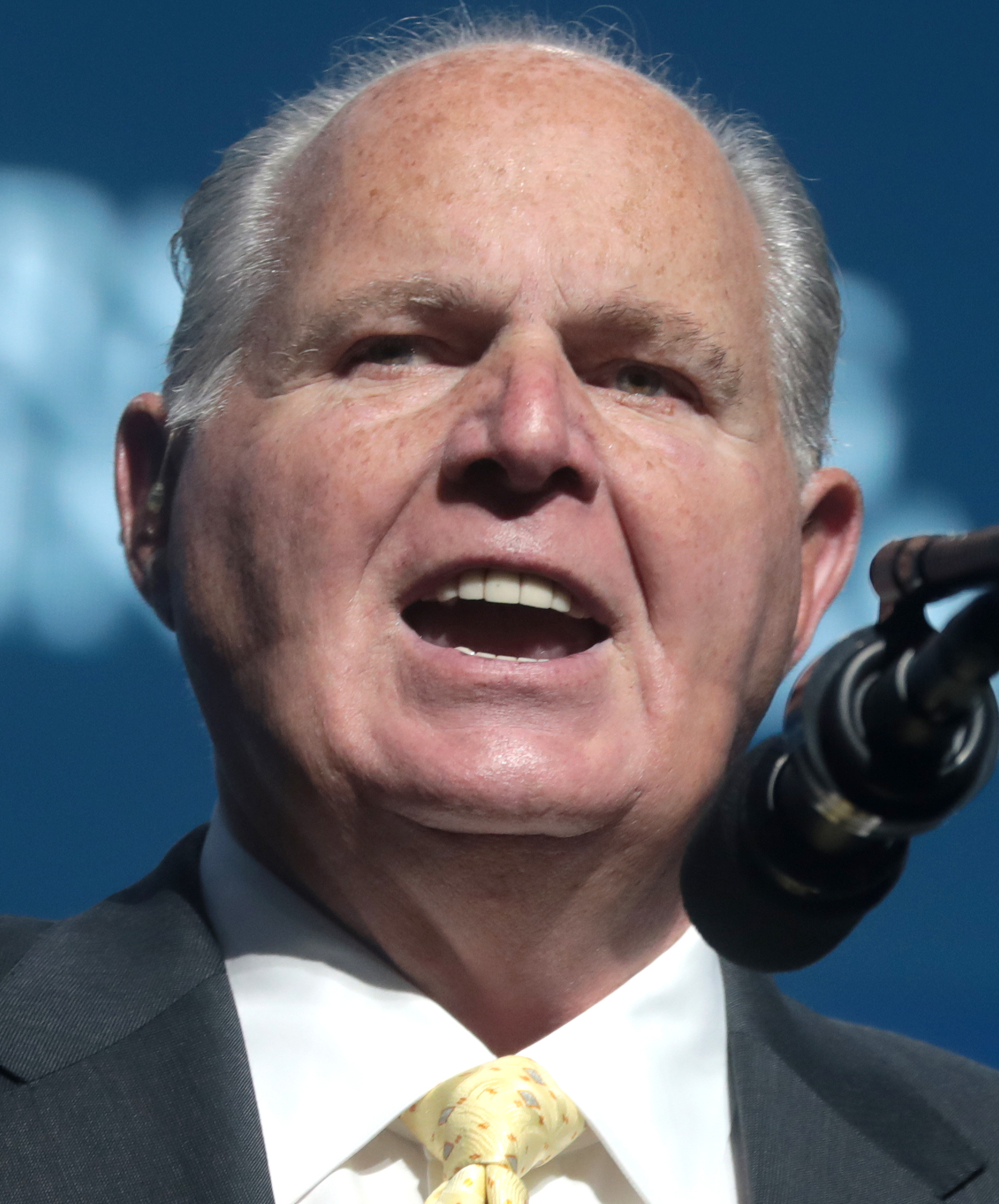
Limbaugh guest starred as himself in "Excellence in Broadcasting".

First announced by series creator and executive producer Seth MacFarlane in an interview on August 13, 2009, the episode was written by series regular Patrick Meighan, and directed by series regular John Holmquist shortly after the conclusion of the production of the eighth season. In the interview, with The Hollywood Reporter, MacFarlane conceded that Family Guy tends to be very liberal because "it's written by liberals". In choosing the conservatives who would be featured in the episode, MacFarlane stated, "we put it out there to a lot of Republicans—'we're doing this show, who wants in?'—and we got some bites." Series regulars Peter Shin and James Purdum served as supervising director, with Andrew Goldberg, Alex Carter, Elaine Ko and Spencer Porter serving as staff writers for the episode. Composer Walter Murphy, who has worked on the series since its inception, returned to compose the music for "Excellence in Broadcasting". It is the first episode to feature a high-definition opening credit sequence.

On The Rush Limbaugh Show on September 27, 2010, Limbaugh explained that he agreed to do the episode based on his continuing friendly relationship with Family Guy creator and executive producer Seth MacFarlane, commenting, "Seth appreciates and has a great affection for professionals, and we're all professionals here." Limbaugh went on to reveal that he was in the studio's sound booth for "three or four days at four hours at a time," while recording his lines for the episode, as well as for the accompanying musical number, which Limbaugh admitted to being something of a challenge. Later on his radio show, Limbaugh went on to criticize 20th Century Fox's public relations department, following a comment by author and commentator Andrew Breitbart, accusing the Fox Broadcasting Company of "burying" the episode. Limbaugh also admitted, however, that "there was nothing in the script that [he] would want them to edit out."

"Excellence in Broadcasting", along with two other episodes from Family Guy's ninth season, was released on a three-disc DVD set in the United States on December 13, 2011. The sets include brief audio commentaries by various crew and cast members for several episodes, a collection of deleted scenes and animatics, a special mini-feature which discussed the process behind animating "And Then There Were Fewer", a mini-feature entitled "The Comical Adventures of Family Guy – Brian & Stewie: The Lost Phone Call", and footage of the Family Guy panel at the 2010 San Diego Comic-Con.

In addition to the regular cast and Limbaugh, actor Gary Cole, actress Christine Lakin, voice actor Phil LaMarr, actress Shelley Long, actress Nana Visitor and actor Rainn Wilson guest starred in the episode. Recurring guest voice actors Chris Cox, actor Ralph Garman, and writers Danny Smith, Alec Sulkin, John Viener and Wellesley Wild also made minor appearances.

Family Guy series producer Kara Vallow is not credited in this episode. According to an Instagram post Vallow made following Limbaugh's death in 2021, she had her name removed in protest.

== Cultural references ==
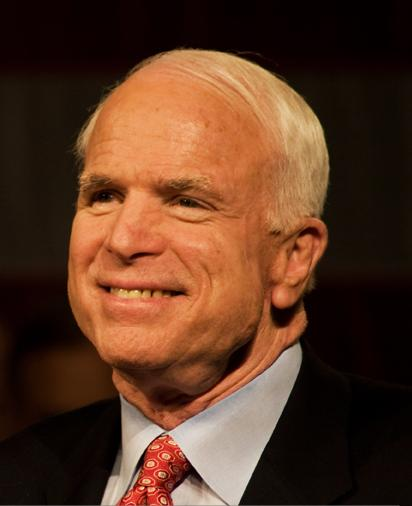
Senator John McCain was parodied in the episode.

In the opening scene of the episode, the Griffin family are shown watching the syndicated television show The Brady Bunch, with Mike and Carol Brady then appearing in bed with one another. After Lois discovers that Limbaugh will be appearing at a book signing in Quahog, Chris references a previous episode, "FOX-y Lady", in which Limbaugh appeared as a character created by actor Fred Savage, which was subsequently reported on by Lois for Fox News. The episode featured a brief cameo appearance of conservative character Stan Smith from Seth MacFarlane's second show, American Dad!.

The scene of Limbaugh rescuing Brian is an almost shot-for-shot homage to the scene of Mr. Miyagi rescuing Daniel in The Karate Kid. Returning home after being saved by Limbaugh, Brian begins watching the NBC comedy series The Office, featuring actor and comedian Rainn Wilson. Deciding to thank Limbaugh for his newfound conservatism, Brian is taken by Limbaugh to the National Republican Party headquarters in Washington, D.C., in order to meet former President of the United States George W. Bush and United States Senator John McCain from Arizona. McCain then recalls when he and Limbaugh solved mysteries together. A parody of the animated television series Scooby-Doo is then shown, including McCain and Limbaugh capturing United States Congressman Barney Frank from Massachusetts, disguised as a mummy.

After deciding to sing a song entitled "Republicantown," several political figures are shown and parodied, including former Vice President of the United States Dick Cheney and former Presidents of the United States Jimmy Carter, Ronald Reagan, Bill Clinton and Barack Obama. Actors Mickey Rourke, Chuck Norris and Jon Voight also appear, while Voight's "pretty hot at one time" daughter is Angelina Jolie. The song "Republicantown" is a parody of the song "The Company Way" from the musical How to Succeed in Business Without Really Trying.

== Reception ==
"Excellence in Broadcasting" was broadcast on October 3, 2010, as a part of an animated television night on Fox, and was preceded by The Simpsons, and Family Guy creator and executive producer Seth MacFarlane's spin-off, The Cleveland Show, and followed by the 100th episode of American Dad!. It was watched by 7.94 million viewers, according to Nielsen ratings, despite airing simultaneously with Desperate Housewives on ABC, the season premiere of Undercover Boss on CBS and Sunday Night Football on NBC. The episode also acquired a 3.9 rating in the 18–49 demographic, beating American Dad! and The Cleveland Show in addition to significantly edging out both shows in total viewership. The episode's ratings decreased significantly from the show's season premiere.

Television critics reacted mostly mixed to "Excellence in Broadcasting", calling the storyline "funny," but "toothless." In a simultaneous review of the episodes of The Simpsons and The Cleveland Show that preceded the show, and the broadcast of American Dad! that followed it, The A.V. Club reviewer Rowan Kaiser noted, "most of the episode was spent justifying its existence as a Rush Limbaugh episode of Family Guy," and that the episode "failed to do that." In the conclusion of his review Kaiser praised Family Guy for its past political humor, but ultimately rated it as a D, the second worst rating, behind The Simpsons episode "Loan-a Lisa" and the American Dad! episode "100 A.D.", beating only The Cleveland Show's F-grade episode "Cleveland Live!". In a slightly more positive review, Jason Hughes of TV Squad praised Limbaugh's appearance in the episode, commenting Limbaugh "certainly deserves credit for his willingness to participate and lend his own voice." Hughes went on to comment positively on the episode's debut of the high-definition opening sequence, and its introduction of Joyce Kinney as a replacement for news anchor Diane Simmons, who was killed off in "And Then There Were Fewer." Adam Markovitz of Entertainment Weekly wrote, "The show definitely skewered Brian’s hardcore conservative conversion, but overall it seemed like a pretty fair fight."

Limbaugh's appearance in the episode has drawn both praise and criticism from news outlets, including Daniel Foster of National Review who commented, "It is to Mr. Limbaugh's credit that he can make fun of himself. But Seth MacFarlane, the whiskey-soaked Dada creator of Family Guy, is responsible for more sophomoric cartooning than the combined patrons of America’s truck stop and dive bar bathrooms." Foster went on to add, "I can only look at the Limbaugh-MacFarlane mash-up with a wary eye." Columnist Matt Lewis of Politics Daily also questioned Limbaugh's appearance on Family Guy, citing his support for former Governor of Alaska Sarah Palin, whose daughter, Bristol Palin, has openly criticized MacFarlane and called the show's writers "heartless jerks." In contrast, John Nolte of Andrew Breitbart's Big Hollywood wrote, "What MacFarlane’s doing fits exactly into our template. He’s entitled to his opinion, worked very hard to reach the top of the most difficult business there is to succeed in, and in turn uses that forum to further his own agenda—that’s how it’s supposed to work. But at the same time he doesn’t completely shut us out." Prior to the episode's official broadcast on television in the United States, Jarett Wieselman of the New York Post called Limbaugh's guest appearance in the episode "genuinely funny," and David Weigel of Slate commented, "I'm not at all surprised that Limbaugh would embrace the show and answer its mockery of conservatives; the plotline [...] is a perfect conservative narrative."
