= American Hostage (TV series) =

American crime drama series

- Genre: Anthology; Crime thriller
- Created by: Shawn Ryan; Eileen Myers
- Based on: American Hostage by: Criminal Content; Amazon Music
- Directed by: Adam Arkin; Nina Lopez Corrado
- Starring: Jon Hamm; Mireille Enos; William Jackson Harper; Giovanni Ribisi; Kristoffer Polaha; Jonathan Tucker; Kat Cunning
- Composer: Robert Duncan
- Country of origin: United States
- Original language: English
- No. of seasons: 1
- No. of episodes: 8

Production
- Executive producers: Jon Hamm; Shawn Ryan; Eileen Myers; Connie Tavel; Marney Hochman; Sharon Hoffman; Shawn Christensen; Gabriel Mason; Adam Arkin; Nina Lopez Corrado; Jen Roskind
- Producers: Ellen Rutter; Rhonda Baker; Carrie Wilkins
- Production location: Winnipeg
- Cinematography: Attila Szalay
- Editors: Bridget Durnford; Christopher A. Smith; Lisa Robison; Lisa Binkley
- Running time: 41–55 minutes
- Production companies: MiddKid Productions; Furious Agreement Productions; Criminal Content; Sony Pictures Television

Original release
- Network: MGM+
- Release: September 20, 2026 – present

American Hostage is an American crime thriller television anthology series created by Shawn Ryan and Eileen Myers for MGM+. Based on the podcast of the same title, the series premiered on September 20, 2026.

== Plot ==
Beloved Indianapolis radio reporter Fred Heckman is thrust into the middle of a life-or-death crisis when hostage-taker Tony Kiritsis demands to be interviewed on his popular radio news program.

== Cast ==
=== Main ===
- Jon Hamm as Fred Heckman
- Mireille Enos as Barbara Heckman
- William Jackson Harper as Ben Hairston
- Giovanni Ribisi as Tony Kiritsis
- Kristoffer Polaha as Dick Hall
- Jonathan Tucker as Cormac McNally
- Kat Cunning as Ibby Hall

=== Recurring ===
- Mark McKinney as Chief Gallagher
- June Laporte as Ginny Hughes
- Joe Cobden as Jerry Morris
- Lisa Codrington as Judy
- Adam Arkin as John C. Ruckelshaus
- Fred Ewanuick as Jimmie

== Production ==
=== Development ===
On November 15, 2023, it was reported that Sony Pictures Television will produce the television series adaptation of the American Hostage podcast with Shawn Ryan and Eileen Myers serving as showrunners and executive producing the series with Jon Hamm, Connie Tavel, Marney Hochman, Shawn Christensen and Gabriel Mason. On April 23, 2025, MGM+ greenlit the series. On June 26, 2025, Adam Arkin was set to direct the first four episodes of the series and serve as executive producer. Nina Lopez Corrado also served as director and executive producer of the series.

=== Casting ===
On November 15, 2023, Hamm was set to portray Fred Heckman in the first season. In August 2025, Mireille Enos joined the cast. In September 2025, William Jackson Harper, Giovanni Ribisi, and Kristoffer Polaha joined the cast. In October 2025, Jonathan Tucker and Kat Cunning were cast in recurring roles.

=== Filming ===
On April 23, 2025, it was reported the first season would be filmed in Winnipeg, Canada.

== Episodes ==
No.	Title	Directed by	Written by	Original release date
1	"My Town Indy"	Adam Arkin	Shawn Ryan & Eileen Myers	September 20, 2026
2	"McMahon, Martinis & Madness"	Adam Arkin	Sharon Hoffman & Eileen Myers	September 20, 2026
3	"Magic Ticket Sweepstakes"	Adam Arkin	Imogen Browder	September 27, 2026
4	"A Taste of Indianapolis"	Adam Arkin	Mike Skerrett	October 4, 2026
5	"WIBC Mystery Science Theater"	Nina Lopez Corrado	Tanya Barfield	October 11, 2026
6	"Moon News and Markets"	Nina Lopez Corrado	Story by : Charlie Haddaway; Teleplay by : Sharon Hoffman & Imogen Browder	October 18, 2026
7	"Tomorrow Is Here"	Nina Lopez Corrado	Abby St. Clair	October 25, 2026
8	"Break the Bank"	Nina Lopez Corrado	Story by : Stacy McDonald; Teleplay by : Eileen Myers & Sharon Hoffman	November 1, 2026

== Release ==
The series premiered on MGM+ on September 20, 2026. Before the MGM+ release, it received a preview screening in the "Primetime" program at the 2026 Toronto International Film Festival.

== Reception ==
On the review aggregator website Rotten Tomatoes, 84% of 19 critics' reviews are positive, with an average rating of 6.7/10. Metacritic, which uses a weighted average, assigned the film a score of 61 out of 100, based on eight critics, indicating "generally favorable" reviews.
