= Tony Kiritsis =

American hostage taker (1932–2005)

- Born: Anthony George Kiritsis; August 13, 1932; Indianapolis, Indiana, U.S.
- Died: January 28, 2005 (aged 72); Indianapolis, Indiana, U.S.
- Resting place: Crown Hill Cemetery
- Known for: Kidnapping of Richard Hall

Anthony George Kiritsis (August 13, 1932 – January 28, 2005) was an American kidnapper. Kiritsis was a resident of Indianapolis, Indiana, US, who had obtained a piece of land for commercial development with a mortgage from Meridian Mortgage but fell behind in making payments. His mortgage broker, Richard O. Hall, refused to allow Kiritsis additional time for payment, so in February 1977, Kiritsis held Hall hostage at gun point demanding "justice", in an event that was widely followed by the local and national media.

== Early life ==
Kiritsis was born in Indianapolis, Indiana, on August 13, 1932, the fourth of five children in the family of Greek immigrants George and Magdelina Kiritsis. He was raised as a Greek Orthodox Christian. He could only speak Greek until learning English in elementary school. After graduating from the Ben Davis High School in 1950, he joined the US Army, served as a small-arms instructor at West Point Military Academy, and was released from service as a corporal. After the Army, he held several jobs, such as lathe operator and car salesman. He followed NASCAR, busied himself with growing fruits and vegetables in his small garden, and frequented garage sales. Eventually, he joined the family business, where he was appointed manager of their trailer park.

He never married, and, as his brother James subsequently said, did not even own a pet because he didn't want to be "attached to anything". James also said that after their mother died from cancer at the age of 41, there was a noticeable change in his brother's personality.

== Background to the crime ==
In 1968, Kiritsis was arrested and charged with assault with intent to murder; the case was dismissed. Later, after an altercation with his brother Tom, he fired two gun shots; charges in that case were also dismissed. A sheriff's detective told the press, "[Kiritsis] is a very hot-tempered individual, who, when he gets mad, does just about anything he wants to." In 1968, Kiritsis left the family business and worked as a salesman at various automobile dealerships. In 1973, he took out a loan for US$110,000 (equivalent to $0.8 million in 2025) from the Meridian Mortgage company and purchased a 17-acre (6.9 ha) property on the northwest corner of Rockville Road and Lynhurst Drive in Indianapolis, which he planned to convert to a shopping center. However, he could neither attract investors and secure development deals, nor meet his loan repayment schedule. He blamed Meridian Mortgage, claiming his mortgage broker, Richard O. Hall, was "sabotaging" his plans. He became convinced that Hall and Hall's father wanted the property for themselves to flip at a high profit, grounding that conviction on the rise in the property's value.

== Kidnapping of Hall ==
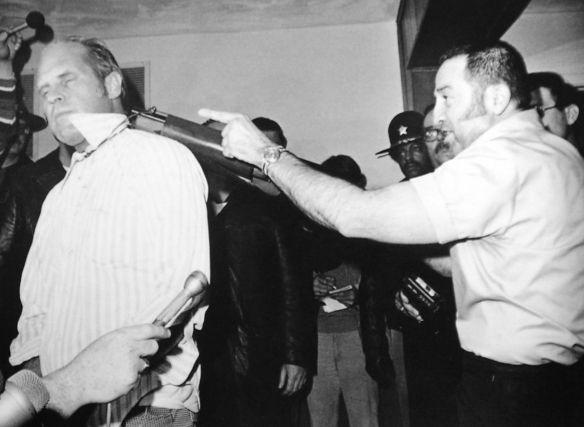
The Pulitzer Prize-winning photo of Kiritsis holding a shotgun to Richard Hall's head

On Tuesday, February 8, 1977, Kiritsis went to the Halls' office and wired the muzzle of a 12-gauge Winchester 1400 sawed-off shotgun to the back of Hall's head. The wire was also connected to the trigger and the other end was connected to Hall's neck. This "dead man's line" meant that if a police officer shot Kiritsis the shotgun would go off and shoot Hall in the head. The same would happen if Hall tried to escape. Kiritsis called the police from Hall's office and told them that he had taken Hall as a hostage.

Kiritsis held Hall hostage for 63 hours. During this time, most of which was spent in Kiritsis's apartment, he made frequent calls to radio station WIBC (1070 AM) newsman Fred Heckman, who broadcast what Kiritsis said. Finally, a lawyer said Hall had signed a document stating that he had mistreated Kiritsis and would pay him $5 million. The document also stated that Kiritsis would not be prosecuted or even arrested. Kiritsis then made a speech in front of live TV cameras declaring himself "a goddamned national hero". His speech became so emotional that some journalists thought he would shoot Hall, so they terminated the live broadcast. In an interview in Dead Man's Line, WISH-TV 8 cameraman Bill Fisher said that police chief Gallagher had a mitigation plan in place, and the chief would pull a handkerchief out of his pocket to signal the launch of that plan. Gallagher would put the gun behind Kiritsis' ear and shoot him while another officer jammed the shotgun. Fisher said Gallagher had reached into his pocket for the handkerchief three times, but put it back each time. Eventually, however, Kiritsis released Hall. He then fired the shotgun into the air to prove it had been loaded. He was immediately arrested, and was ultimately found not guilty by reason of insanity.

Most people who knew Kiritsis had positive things to say about him and were shocked by his actions. Kiritsis was described as "always helpful and kind to his neighbors, a hard worker and a strict law-and-order sort of man". Kiritsis also said several times that he did not want anyone to get hurt and apologized for the way he had treated Dick Hall. At his trial, psychiatrists said he was psychotic and in a "paranoid delusional state" during the hostage incident.

== Later life ==
Kiritsis was released from a mental institution in January 1988 after the state could not prove he was still a danger to society, and moved to Speedway. After some time, he returned to Indianapolis, where he died of natural causes on January 28, 2005, in his home. He was 72 years old. His body is buried at the Crown Hill Cemetery.

== Aftermath ==
At the time of the trial, Indiana law (and that of some other states) required the prosecution to disprove a defendant's claim of insanity, that is, to prove the defendant sane, beyond a reasonable doubt. Directly as a result of the Kiritsis trial—particularly the testimony of chief defense psychiatrist Larry M. Davis—and the trial of John Hinckley Jr., Indiana and other states substantially revised their law to place the burden of proof for insanity-pleading on the defendant.

John H. Blair, a freelance photographer for UPI, took a photograph of the incident that won him the 1978 Pulitzer Prize for Spot News Photography. Footage of the incident was included in the 1982 documentary The Killing of America as one of many examples of gun violence in the United States.

A feature-length documentary about the hostage incident called Dead Man's Line was released in 2018.

A dramatization of the hostage incident starring Jon Hamm as Fred Heckman was released as an 8-episode podcast called American Hostage in 2022. The television series adaptation of the podcast premiered on MGM+ on September 20, 2026, with Hamm reprising his role as Heckman. Kiritsis was played by Giovanni Ribisi in the series.

A 2025 film adaptation directed by Gus Van Sant, titled Dead Man's Wire, based on the Kiritsis documentary Dead Man's Line, featured Bill Skarsgård and Dacre Montgomery.
