= American Hostage =

Thriller podcast

American Hostage is a scripted psychological thriller podcast directed by Shawn Christensen and starring Jon Hamm, Joseph Perrino, Carla Gugino, and Dylan Baker. It was produced by Criminal Content and released on February 22, 2022, by Amazon Music and Wondery. On March 8, 2022, it debuted at #7 on Apple Podcasts in the United States.

== Background ==
It is a dramatization of the true incident of Tony Kiritsis, who took his mortgage broker hostage in 1977. The crisis took place over three days.

== Television adaptation ==
On November 15, 2023, it was announced that American Hostage would be adapted into a television anthology series of the same name, with Sony Pictures Television serving as studio, Shawn Ryan and Eileen Myers as co-creators, and Hamm reprising his role as Fred Heckman. The series was greenlit by MGM+ on April 23, 2025, with shooting scheduled for the following fall in Winnipeg, Manitoba, Canada. The series will premiere on September 20, 2026.
