= Welcome Back, Carter =

- Family Guy episode
- Episode no.: Season 9 Episode 3
- Directed by: Cyndi Tang-Loveland
- Written by: Wellesley Wild
- Production code: 8ACX04
- Original air date: October 10, 2010

Guest appearances
- Max Burkholder as mouse altar boy; Christine Lakin as Paula's friend; Rachael MacFarlane as Paula's friend

Episode chronology
← Previous "Excellence in Broadcasting"	Next → "Halloween on Spooner Street"
- Family Guy season 9

"Welcome Back, Carter" is the third episode of the ninth season of the animated comedy series Family Guy. It originally aired on Fox in the United States on October 10, 2010. The episode follows Peter after he discovers his father-in-law, Carter Pewterschmidt is having an affair with another woman. Deciding to blackmail him, Peter begins taking advantage of his father-in-law's enormous wealth, before accidentally spilling the beans to Carter's wife, Barbara, who divorces him soon after. Peter then becomes Carter's wingman, and helps him rediscover his bachelorhood, as he begins navigating through the dating scene.

The episode was written by Wellesley Wild and directed by Cyndi Tang-Loveland. It received mixed reviews from critics for its storyline and many cultural references. According to Nielsen ratings, it was viewed in 7.02 million homes in its original airing. The episode featured guest performances by Max Burkholder, Christine Lakin and Rachael MacFarlane, along with several recurring guest voice actors for the series. "Welcome Back, Carter" was released on DVD along with three other episodes from the season on December 13, 2011.

== Plot ==
After deciding to visit her parents, Carter and Barbara Pewterschmidt, Lois, along with her husband, Peter, discover an old photo album showcasing Barbara and Carter's love for each other, as well as Barbara's short-lived affair during the "Great War with Alaska", during which, after returning home from combat, Carter reclaims his wife, and the two's love is shown to have lasted ever since. Becoming bored, Peter is tasked to call his father-in-law to dinner, and soon discovers Carter on his yacht, so he rows over to get him. He then sees Carter having sex with a dark-haired Asian woman. Carter demands he doesn't tell. Questioning his father-in-law's judgment, he eventually promises to keep the affair a secret from Barbara. The next day, at the Drunken Clam, Peter begins discussing the affair with Brian Griffin, Quagmire and Joe, who suggest Peter blackmail Carter as revenge for his constant mistreatment of Peter.

Visiting his wife's parents during the middle of the night, Peter informs Carter that he is now his personal slave, and must perform any task he wishes, including having a limousine joust, which ends with them experiencing massive blood loss, and writing witty catchphrases. Noticing Peter and Carter spending time together, Barbara and Lois soon witness the two taking a high-definition television out of the house. But while they are doing this, Peter accidentally spills the beans to Barbara about the affair, and Barbara is instantly devastated by this and runs of the room sobbing.

Enraged by this, Carter announces that Barbara is divorcing him, causing Brian to suggest he meet other people. Taking him to the local club, Peter introduces Carter to the dating scene, where he soon meets Paula, an attractive blonde. Going on to demand an African American patron fetch him a drink, Carter is accused of being a racist by Paula, who leaves him. Continuing to desire Barbara, Carter decides to take a bouquet of roses to his former wife. While there, he discovers that Barbara has begun dating Roginald, the man she had an affair with during the war (who sings to her in the tune of 'The Miners Mother'). Announcing he has something important to say to Barbara, Carter confesses his love for her, and apologizes. Barbara then allows Carter to earn her trust by letting him move back in, and the two ultimately embrace in a passionate kiss.

== Production and development ==
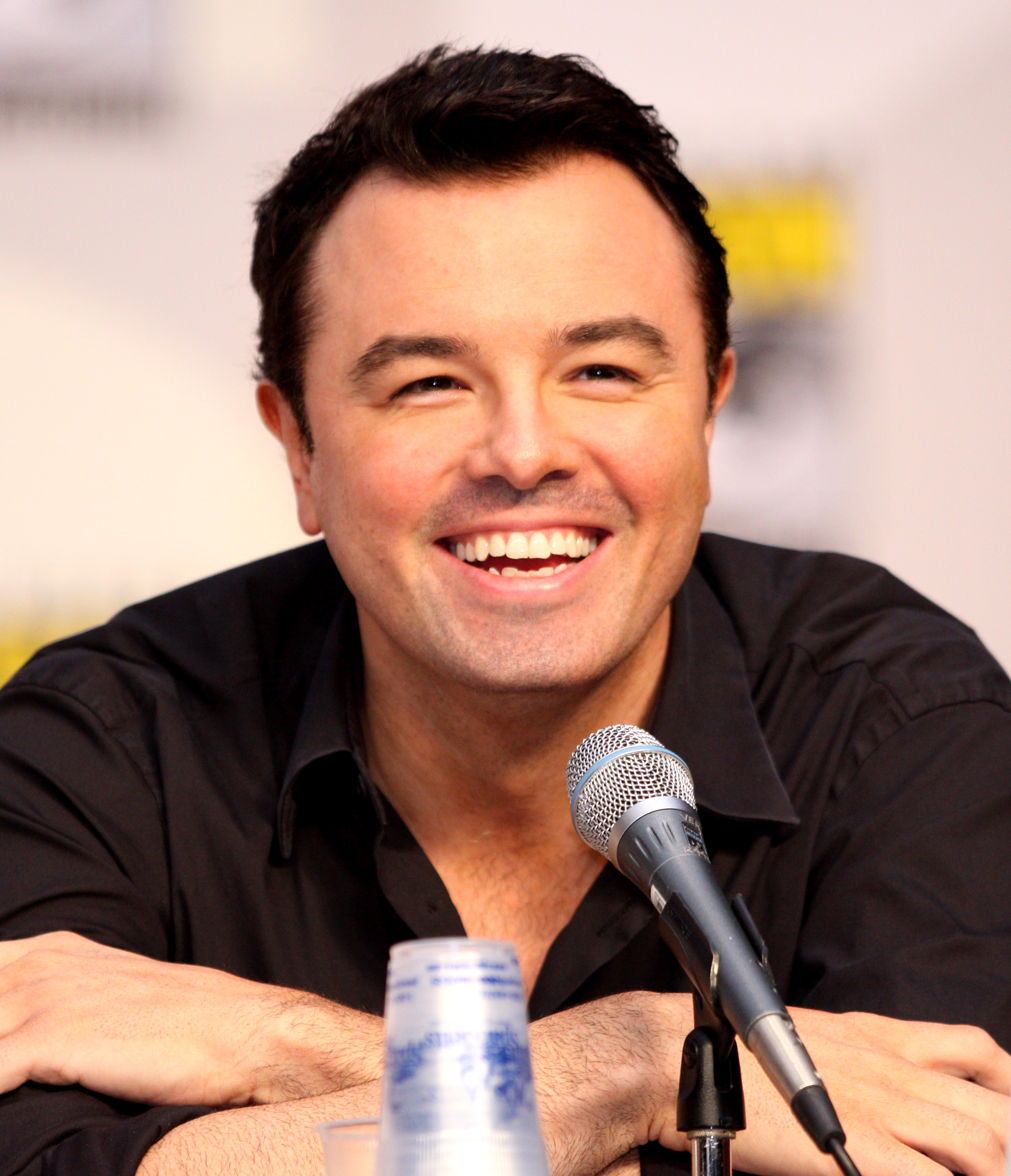
Series creator Seth MacFarlane does the voice of Carter Pewterschmidt in addition to his regular characters.

The episode was written by series regular Wellesley Wild and directed by series regular Cyndi Tang-Loveland shortly after the conclusion of the eighth production season. Series veterans Peter Shin and James Purdum, both of whom having previously served as animation directors, served as supervising directors for the episode, with Andrew Goldberg, Alex Carter, Elaine Ko, Spencer Porter and Aaron Blitzstein serving as staff writers for the episode. Composer Ron Jones, who has worked on the series since its inception, returned to compose the music for "Welcome Back, Carter". Series creator and executive producer Seth MacFarlane reprised his role as Carter Pewterschmidt, with main cast member and former series writer Alex Borstein providing the voice of Carter's wife, Barbara Pewterschmidt.

"Welcome Back, Carter", along with the two other episodes from Family Guy's ninth season, was released on a three-disc DVD set in the United States on December 13, 2011. The sets include brief audio commentaries by various crew and cast members for several episodes, a collection of deleted scenes and animatics, a special mini-feature which discussed the process behind animating "And Then There Were Fewer", a mini-feature entitled "The Comical Adventures of Family Guy – Brian & Stewie: The Lost Phone Call", and footage of the Family Guy panel at the 2010 San Diego Comic-Con.

In addition to the regular cast, child actor Max Burkholder, actress Christine Lakin, and voice actress Rachael MacFarlane guest starred in the episode. Recurring guest voice actress Alexandra Breckenridge, actor Ralph Garman, and writers Patrick Meighan, Danny Smith, Alec Sulkin and John Viener also made minor appearances. Actor Patrick Warburton appeared in the episode as well.

== Cultural references ==
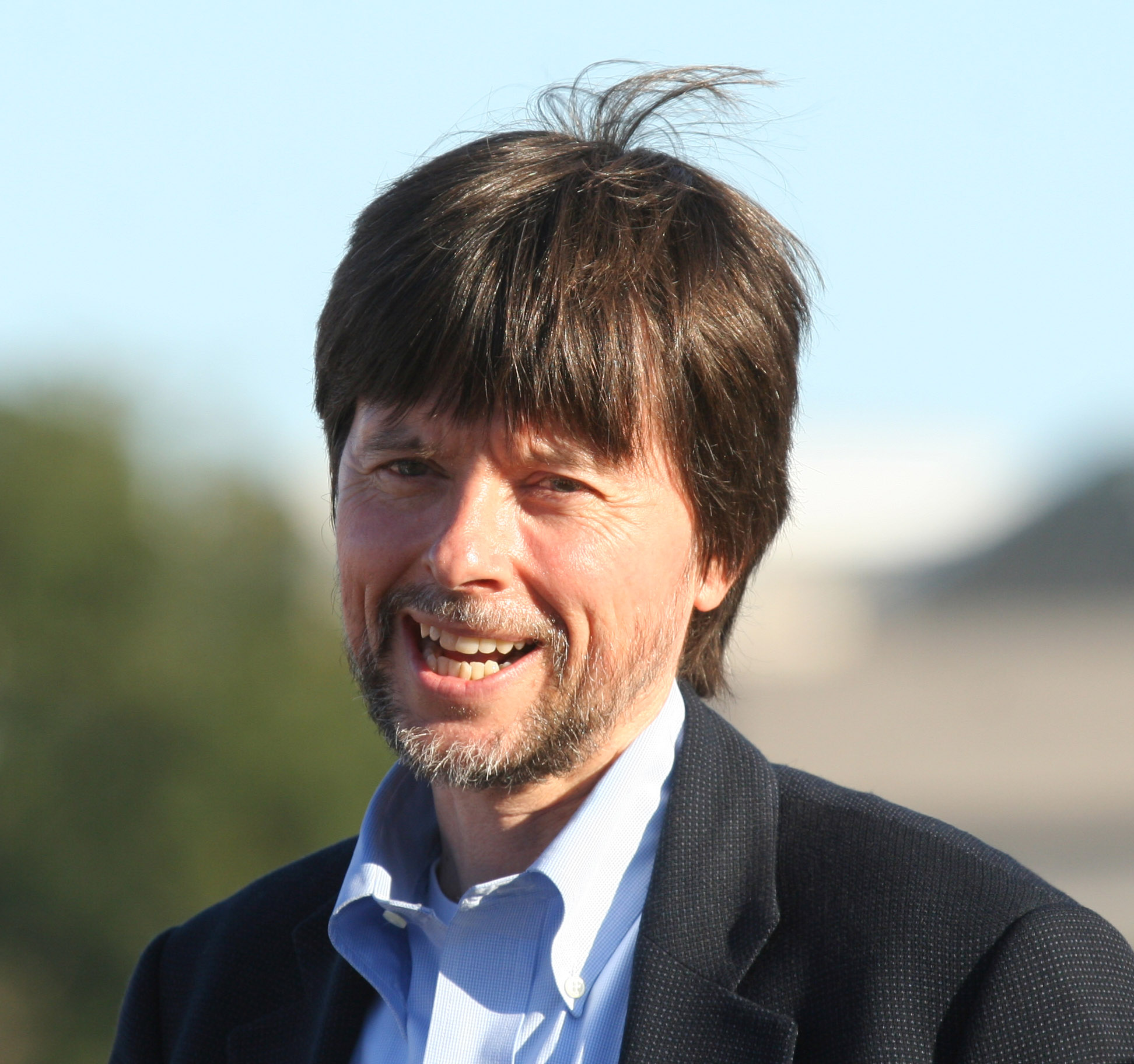
Director Ken Burns was referenced in the episode.

In the opening scene of the episode, Peter notices a painting of a ship in his mother-in-law's living room, and questions whether or not he can change the channel. Lois goes on to instruct Peter that it is not a television, with Barbara interrupting and telling him it is actually the television channel PBS. Peter then interjects his hatred of PBS, after viewing a nine-part series on traffic signs by director and producer Ken Burns, the fourth of which on the yield sign. Later, after returning to dinner, Peter becomes an embarrassment to Lois, who recalls having dinner with Paul McCartney's ex-wife, Heather Mills, during which Peter began playing footsie with Mills, whose prosthetic leg ultimately falls off.

In an attempt to make Barbara love Carter again, Peter instructs him that he must befriend a cute child in order to win her over. Peter then invites child actor Jonathan Lipnicki to the Griffin family home, but he is immediately shocked by his change in appearance.

== Reception ==
"Welcome Back, Carter" was broadcast on October 10, 2010, as a part of an animated television night on Fox, and was preceded by The Simpsons, and Family Guy creator and executive producer Seth MacFarlane's spin-off, The Cleveland Show, and followed by an episode of American Dad!. It was watched by 7.02 million viewers, according to Nielsen ratings, despite airing simultaneously with Desperate Housewives on ABC, The Amazing Race on CBS and Sunday Night Football on NBC, and falling only 15% from the previous week's broadcast. The episode also acquired a 3.4 rating in the 18–49 demographic, beating The Simpsons, American Dad! and The Cleveland Show in addition to significantly edging out all three shows in total viewership.

Television critics reacted mostly mixed to "Welcome Back, Carter", calling the storyline "hit-or-miss." In a simultaneous review of the episodes of The Simpsons and The Cleveland Show that preceded the show, and the broadcast of American Dad! that followed it, The A.V. Club's Rowan Kaiser noted the apparent lack of guest stars in the episode, adding, "I can't help but feel [it] is a good thing in for Family Guy." In the conclusion of her review Kaiser praised the "shock humor" in the limousine jousting scene, but compared Carter's catchphrases to "the kind of groan-inducing meta-humor that [...] The Cleveland Show aims for." She ultimately gave the episode a C rating, the second best rating of the night, beating The Cleveland Show episode "How Cleveland Got His Groove Back" and tying with the American Dad! episode "Son of Stan". In a slightly more neutral review of the episode, Jason Hughes of TV Squad praised the episode's cutaways, stating that they "came back with a vengeance this week." Hughes went on to comment negatively on the scene involving Carter being woken up and hinting at incest with his daughter, noting, "It's weird that while the pedophile character of Herbert doesn't bother me at all, this potential admission really does. Maybe because it adds an element of incest, or seemed more genuine than Herbert's over-the-top antics. But really, it's just another throwaway gag in the world of Seth MacFarlane." Actor Jonathan Lipnicki, who was parodied in the episode, responded to his portrayal by stating, "I don't feel bad about what they said on Family Guy. It was all in good fun, I've worked on that show [before]."
