= Larry M. Davis =

American psychiatrist (1943–2006)

Larry M. Davis, M.D. (February 1943 – 20 November 2006) was a practicing American psychiatrist from 1971 until his accidental death in 2006.

== Forensic expertise ==
Davis was a board certified Forensic Psychiatrist and Forensic Examiner. He served as Diplomat for the American Board of Psychiatry and Neurology, the American Board of Forensic Medicine, the American Board of Forensic Examiners, and the American Board of Clinical Sexology.

== Watershed influence ==
Davis served as a psychiatric expert witness on hundreds of cases. Most famously, he was the chief defense psychiatrist in the Tony Kiritsis case. This was one of three watershed cases (including that of John Hinckley Jr.) that diametrically shifted the burden of proof from the prosecution to the defense when the defendant asserts an affirmative defense of insanity.

== Career focus ==
Davis focused much of his career on human sexuality. He was expert in diagnosing and treating sexual recidivism in criminals, and post traumatic stress disorder from prior sexual trauma. He was also expert on sex therapy for seniors.

== Geography of practice ==
Davis was a driving force behind Indiana University School of Medicine’s first Forensic Psychiatry training program.

He was licensed to practice psychiatry in Indiana, Illinois and Kentucky.

He was a co-founder of the Indianapolis-based Davis Clinic.

He was Founder and Medical Director of Indiana’s first private outpatient sex offender treatment program, and supervisor of a successful treatment program for victims of sex offense.

At the time of his death, Davis was Indiana’s only practicing sex therapist/physician certified by the American Association of Sexuality Educators, Counselors and Therapists (AASECT).

== Biography ==
Davis was married (Betty), and had two daughters and two granddaughters at the time of his death.

Prior to private civilian practice, Davis served as Chief of Psychiatry at Langley Air Force Base and as Vice President for the Air Force Society of Psychiatrists.

Davis held a pilot's license, and died in the crash of a small single-engine aircraft near Milford, Illinois, on 20 November 2006. He was the sole occupant of the craft.
