= Fox-y Lady =

- Family Guy episode
- Brian warns Lois about Fox News' biased agenda.
- Episode no.: Season 7 Episode 10
- Directed by: Pete Michels
- Written by: Matt Fleckenstein
- Production code: 6ACX14
- Original air date: March 22, 2009

Guest appearances
- Meredith Baxter-Birney as herself; Peter Chernin as himself; Ed Helms as Al Gore; John Moschitta, Jr. as himself and Jim Spleen; Seth Rogen as himself; Fred Savage as himself; Daniel Stern as the narrator; Sharon Tay as Rhonda Latimer

Episode chronology
← Previous "The Juice Is Loose"	Next → "Not All Dogs Go to Heaven"
- Family Guy season 7

"Fox-y Lady" (stylized as "FOX-y Lady") is the tenth episode in the seventh season of the American animated television series Family Guy. It premiered on Fox in the United States on March 22, 2009. The episode is centered on Lois Griffin's employment at Fox News, despite Brian's warnings. On her first day on the job, she is assigned to do a report on Michael Moore's perceived homosexuality, but it is rejected when the exposé involves conservative Republican Rush Limbaugh. Meanwhile, Peter and Chris decide to create their own animated sitcom. The pilot episode is a success with the CEO, but Peter decides not to air it over suggestions that it may be edited.

The episode was written by Matt Fleckenstein and directed by Pete Michels. It received mixed reviews from critics for its storyline and many cultural references. According to Nielsen ratings, the episode was watched by 7.45 million viewers in its original airing in the United States. The episode featured guest performances by Seth Rogen, Meredith Baxter, Peter Chernin, Fred Savage, Daniel Stern, Ed Helms, Sharon Tay, John Moschitta, Jr. and Mark DeCarlo. "Fox-y Lady", along with the six remaining episodes from Family Guy's seventh season and the first eight episodes from the eighth season, was released on a three-disc DVD set in the United States on June 15, 2010.

== Plot ==
Rhonda Latimer, an aging reporter for Fox News who is idolized by viewers because of her good looks, is dismissed when the network's first high-definition broadcast exposes her wrinkles, leaving a job opportunity open. Lois auditions for the part, ignoring Brian's impassioned warnings about Fox News' conservative bias, and she is chosen as the new reporter. On her first day reporting, she is assigned to do an exposé on Michael Moore to prove that he is a homosexual. When she spies on him outside his house, she sees Rush Limbaugh coming out, leading her to conclude that Limbaugh and Moore are in a relationship. However, Fox News refuses to allow any material that could compromise fellow conservative Limbaugh to be broadcast, leading Lois to realize that Brian was right about them. The two decide to take the story into their own hands and confront who they expect to be Moore and a naked Limbaugh in the same bedroom, only to discover that both are personas portrayed by Fred Savage, who has created bodysuits of them and other public figures – including Tony Danza, Camryn Manheim, Malcolm Jamal Warner, Kevin Nealon, John Forsythe and Lars Ulrich – as a means of continuing his acting career. He allows an impressed Lois and Brian to report his story instead.

Meanwhile, Peter, with help from Chris and Meg, decides to create an animated series about a trio of handicapped ducks entitled Handi-Quacks due to Lois' newfound connections with Fox. Meg's reasonable, albeit banal, suggestions are ignored by Peter in favor of Chris' outlandish ideas, and Peter eventually fires her. He and Chris settle on developing the show's pilot episode around a joke involving a wood stove and a house of cards, and invite Cleveland, Quagmire and Joe to voice the characters. Although it is suggested that the crudely animated and written pilot will likely fail, CEO Peter Chernin enjoys it and agrees to produce the show, but Peter is insulted when he suggests that the character Poopyface Tomato Nose's nose be a plum instead of a tomato. Peter's passion for Handi-Quacks impresses Chernin, who offers him full creative control over the show's production, but a still-aggrieved Peter rebuffs the deal entirely, which he quickly regrets.

At the end of the episode, the family settles in to watch a new sitcom on Fox starring Savage; Lois reveals that she is no longer working as a reporter, but does not bother to reveal how or why due to a perceived lack of interest from the audience.

== Production ==
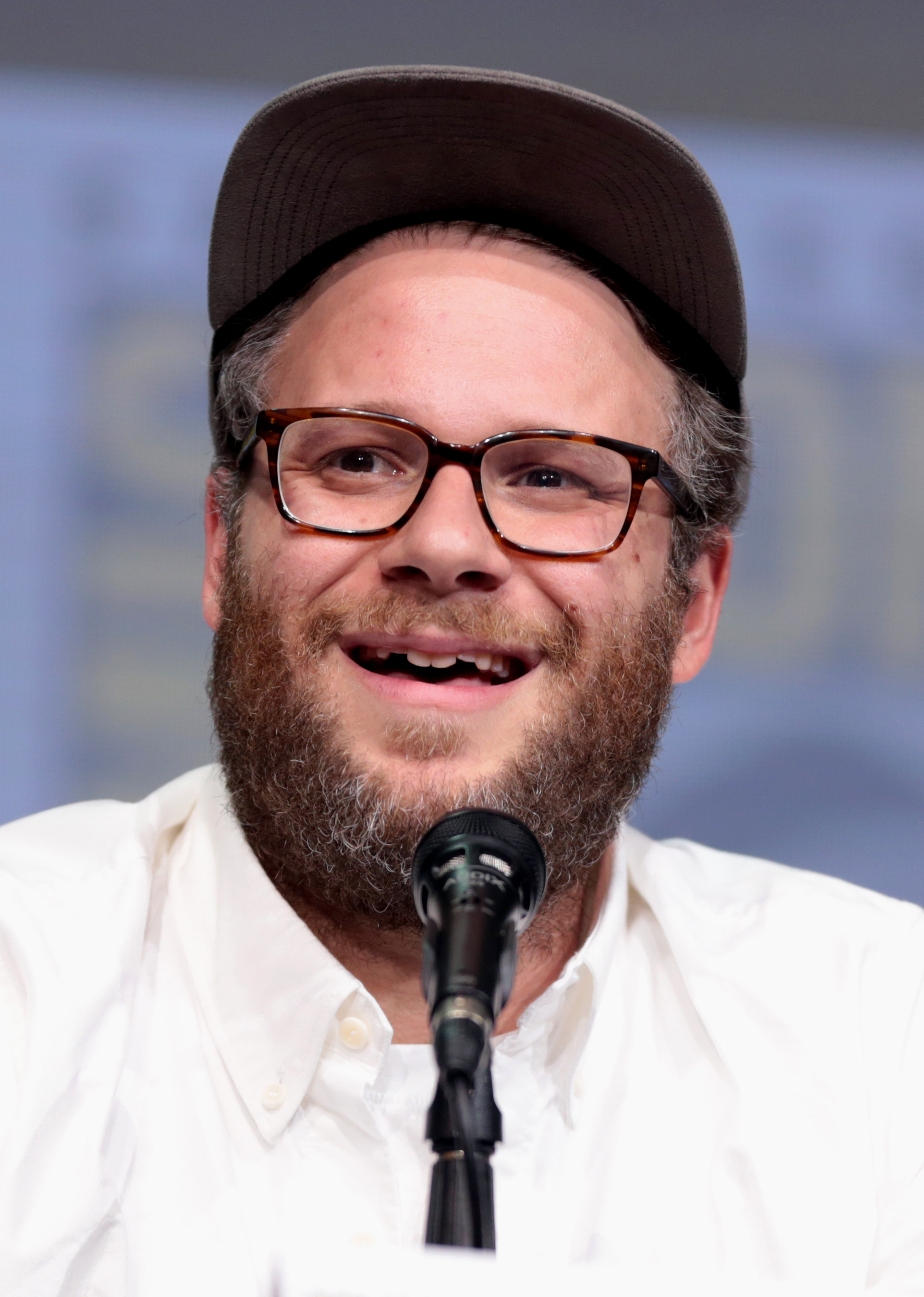
Actor Seth Rogen guest starred in the episode.

"Fox-y Lady" is the tenth episode of Family Guy's seventh season. The episode was written by former iCarly writer Matt Fleckenstein and directed by former supervising director Pete Michels.

"Fox-y Lady", along with the seven other episodes from Family Guy's eighth season and seven from the seventh season, was released on a three-disc DVD set in the United States on June 15, 2010. The DVDs included brief audio commentaries by Seth MacFarlane, and various crew and cast members from several episodes, a collection of deleted scenes, a special mini-feature that discussed the process behind animating "Road to the Multiverse", and a mini-feature entitled Family Guy Karaoke. The set also includes a reprint of the script for the episode.

In addition to the regular cast, actor Seth Rogen cameoed as himself, this being his second appearance on the show after "Family Gay". Then-Fox Entertainment Group CEO Peter Chernin and The Wonder Years star Fred Savage also guest-starred, along with Daniel Stern as that series' narrator, and Ed Helms, Sharon Tay, John Moschitta, Jr. and Mark DeCarlo appeared as well. Recurring voice actors Jackson Douglas, Jennifer Tilly, and Kim Parks, and writers Kirker Butler, Steve Callaghan, Mark Hentemann, Danny Smith, Alec Sulkin, and John Viener made cameo appearances in the episode as well. Actress Meredith Baxter-Birney voices herself in a cutaway. Actors Adam West and Patrick Warburton appeared in the episode as well.

== Cultural references ==
When Lois is given her contract after getting a job at Fox News, she happily runs home in a way reminiscent of Willy Wonka & the Chocolate Factory when that film's protagonist, Charlie Bucket, runs home after receiving his golden ticket. She then falls and starts moaning, much like Peter did after he won a tour of the Pawtucket brewery in "Wasted Talent", but instead of grabbing her kneecap as Peter did, she grabs her right breast.

Later on at the studio, Stewie's broadcast on Fox News is a parody of a viral video clip of an angry Bill O'Reilly misreading his teleprompter; this scene was cut from the TV airing due to profane language and time constraints, but is on the DVD version.

When Fred Savage is proven to be Rush Limbaugh and Michael Moore, he also reveals himself to be Tony Danza, Camryn Manheim, Malcolm-Jamal Warner, Kevin Nealon, John Forsythe, and Metallica drummer Lars Ulrich. After Savage confesses to his multiple identities, the voice-over from The Wonder Years (Daniel Stern reprising his role) is heard and Fred angrily shouts at him, "I don't need you anymore!" In the DVD version, Stern responds, criticizing Fred over his negative attitude.

== Reception ==
In its original airing in the United States, "Fox-y Lady" was watched by 7.45 million viewers, surpassing the other shows in the "Animation Domination" block. It gained a 3.7 rating in the 18–49 demographic, finishing second in its timeslot.

The episode received generally mixed reviews from television sources and critics. Alex Rocha of TV Guide called it a "pretty dull episode, but with some bright humorous spots [...] The episode looked like it had potential, but definitely did not perform to its best." Ahsan Haque of IGN called it "far from perfect" but "definitely a lot better than the terrible O.J. Simpson episode from last week." He called the Handi-Quacks scenes "fantastic" and called the episode overall "definitely a step in the right direction." Robin Pierson of The TV Critic said: "More purpose in the plot and more jokes related to the story than usual" and gave the episode 40 out of 100. Steve Heisler of The A.V. Club wrote that "tonight's Family Guy was the best it's been in a looooong time". He stated that in both plotlines "the game is established early [...] and the show escalates nicely", and graded the episode a B.
