= Dead Man's Line =

2018 documentary film about the Tony Kiritsis hostage case

- Directed by: Alan Berry, Mark Enochs
- Written by: Mark Enochs, Alan Berry
- Produced by: Alan Berry
- Production company: Indy Filmhouse
- Distributed by: Indy Filmhouse
- Release date: 2018
- Running time: 98 minutes
- Country: United States
- Language: English

Dead Man's Line is a 2018 American true crime documentary film directed by Alan Berry and produced by Berry and Mark Enochs. The film chronicles the 1977 Indianapolis hostage crisis involving Tony Kiritsis, a 63-hour standoff that drew national attention. Using archival news footage, crime-scene recordings, and interviews with detectives, journalists, and negotiators, the film reconstructs how the event unfolded and examines its impact on law enforcement and media coverage. The documentary later served as a basis for Gus Van Sant's 2025 feature film Dead Man's Wire.

== Background ==
The 1977 Tony Kiritsis hostage incident drew sustained national attention and had enduring effects on media coverage of live crisis events. According to the Encyclopedia of Indianapolis, Kiritsis wired a shotgun to the hostage's neck and traversed Indianapolis streets, compelling live news coverage and prompting public debate about media responsibility. The Indiana Broadcasting Heritage Association similarly described the 62-hour standoff as one that "forever changed Indiana broadcasting," prompting new standards for live crisis coverage and newsroom ethics.

== Production ==
In an interview with ForenSeek, directors Alan Berry and Mark Enochs described how they became interested in revisiting the Kiritsis case and the challenges of sourcing archival footage from local Indianapolis television stations. They noted that the project originated as an attempt to preserve a forgotten part of state history while exploring how the 1977 event reshaped media coverage of violent crime.

== Release ==
Dead Man's Line premiered in 2018 and was distributed by Indy Filmhouse. The documentary became available on digital platforms and was featured in several regional screenings and true-crime festivals. It is also available for streaming on Amazon Prime Video.

== Reception ==
Film critic Richard Propes of The Independent Critic awarded the documentary 3½ out of 4 stars, describing it as "a gripping, unsettling, and important account of one of Indianapolis's most unforgettable crimes."

Christopher Lloyd of The Film Yap praised the film's detailed approach and interviews, writing that it "reconstructs an unbelievable story that feels like something out of a Hollywood thriller."

The documentary was also discussed on the True Crime Obsessed podcast in episode 162, where hosts provided additional commentary and context on the Kiritsis case.

It was later featured on the Swindled podcast in episode 20, "The Hostage (Tony Kiritsis / Clay Allen Duke)," which examined the historical background and broader implications of the case.

== Accolades ==
In 2018, Dead Man's Line won the "IFJA Hoosier Award" from the Indiana Film Journalists Association, recognizing significant cinematic contributions connected to Indiana.

The film was also awarded "Best Documentary" at the 2017 East Lansing Film Festival.
