= Dead Man's Wire =

2025 American drama film

- Theatrical release poster
- Directed by: Gus Van Sant
- Written by: Austin Kolodney
- Produced by: Cassian Elwes; Joel David Moore; Tom Culliver; Veronica Radaelli; Sam Pressman; Mark Amin; Remi Alfallah; Noor Alfallah; Siena Oberman; Andrea Bucko; Matt Murphie; Paula Paizes; Justin Hurley
- Starring: Bill Skarsgård; Dacre Montgomery; Cary Elwes; Myha'la; Colman Domingo; Al Pacino
- Cinematography: Arnaud Potier
- Edited by: Saar Klein
- Music by: Danny Elfman
- Production companies: Elevated Films; Pressman Film; District 9 Productions; Sobini Films; RNA Pictures; Pinstripes
- Distributed by: Row K Entertainment
- Release dates: September 2, 2025 (Venice); January 9, 2026 (United States)
- Running time: 106 minutes
- Country: United States
- Language: English
- Budget: < $15 million
- Box office: $3.8 million

Dead Man's Wire is a 2025 American crime thriller film directed by Gus Van Sant and written by Austin Kolodney, working with historical consultants Alan Berry and Mark Enochs, who together made the 2018 documentary Dead Man's Line examining the same events. The film is inspired by the 1977 hostage standoff involving Tony Kiritsis. It stars Bill Skarsgård as Kiritsis, alongside an ensemble cast including Dacre Montgomery, Cary Elwes, Myha'la, Colman Domingo, and Al Pacino.

The film premiered out of competition at the 82nd Venice International Film Festival on September 2, 2025, and was given a wide theatrical release on January 9, 2026, by Row K Entertainment.

== Plot ==
On Tuesday, February 8, 1977, in Indianapolis, Tony Kiritsis arrives for an appointment with wealthy mortgage broker M.L. Hall at the Meridian Mortgage company. Tony is instead met by M.L.'s son Richard, who reveals that M.L. has left on vacation. Tony then holds Richard at gunpoint and wires a shotgun to his neck as a dead man's switch, rigged to fire if he tries to escape or anyone interferes. He believes the Halls cheated him of potential profit after he bought land to develop and is determined to expose them. He notifies the local police that he has taken Richard prisoner then commandeers a police car. He forces Richard to drive them to Tony's home, closely followed by the authorities as well as local reporters.

Inside his apartment, Tony has booby-trapped the doors and windows with explosives, and secures Richard and the shotgun to his kitchen table. The building is evacuated and Tony makes his demands known, including an apology from M.L., as news of the standoff spreads. Letting Richard phone his wife, Tony makes a call himself to local radio DJ Fred Temple, who records him explaining how desperation drove him to take drastic action. The police allow Fred to air the recording while they formulate a plan, with Fred continuing to act as their liaison with Tony.

On Wednesday, the FBI gets involved; M.L. refuses to acknowledge Tony's grievances or apologize during a phone call with Richard and Tony. The police summon Tony's brother Jimmy. On Thursday, the authorities organize a televised press conference for Tony, ostensibly granting him immunity and forgiving his debt with millions in compensation, but prepare to kill him if necessary. With Jimmy's assurance, Tony decides to go through with the conference and reattaches Richard to the shotgun.

On live television, Tony declares himself a national hero, and forces Richard to read a statement from the company before taking over himself. Tony signs documents to guarantee his demands, convinced he has brought the Halls to justice and secured the money he feels he is owed. As Richard is released, Tony fires the shotgun in the air to prove it was loaded, before he is promptly arrested. Richard is reunited with his wife, while a furious Tony is taken away.

On Tuesday, October 25, 1977, Tony is tried and found not guilty by reason of insanity, to the dismay of the Halls and the police, but having found public support. Tony asserts his sanity as he leaves the courthouse. Many years later, Tony and Richard coincidentally cross paths at a bakery, wordlessly going their separate ways.

An epilogue reveals that Tony was sentenced to two years in a mental institution, but served an additional eight years for refusing psychiatric treatment. He was also under FBI investigation until his death in 2005. Richard struggled with alcoholism in the wake of his abduction, and his company eventually filed for bankruptcy.

== Cast ==
- Bill Skarsgård as Tony Kiritsis
- Dacre Montgomery as Richard Hall
- Cary Elwes as Detective Michael Grable
- Myha'la as Linda Page
- Colman Domingo as Fred Temple
- Al Pacino as M.L. Hall
- John Robinson as John the Cameraman
- Kelly Lynch as Mabel Hall
- Todd Gable as Chief Gallagher
- Mark Helms as Frank Love
- Michael Ashcraft as George Martz
- Neil Mulac as Agent Patrick Mullaney
- Daniel R. Hill as Jimmy Kiritsis

== Production ==
The script was written in 2020 by Austin Kolodney. He was introduced to the true story via a podcast episode, and subsequently enlisted the help of documentarians Alan Berry and Mark Enochs (makers of the 2018 documentary Dead Man's Line on the events) to research and compile all the information of the events available. In March 2024, it was reported that the film was in development with Werner Herzog and Nicolas Cage attached to direct and star in the film, respectively.

By December 2024, Gus Van Sant was set to direct with Bill Skarsgård and Dacre Montgomery leading the cast. Talking about his decision to make the film, Van Sant said: "When I read the script there were links embedded in it – you could click them and hear the real 911 calls. Tony talked so fast, like Scorsese on a cocaine bender, cracking jokes and losing his temper. I thought, 'This is an amazing character. The story had this weird barnstormer energy ... The producer said, 'We have to start shooting in Louisville in two months.' That was the most appealing thing – just hitting the road." Skarsgaard was someone Van Sant had wanted to work with for a long time; while Van Sant cast Montgomery off of his viral Stranger Things audition tape.

In January 2025, Colman Domingo, Myha'la, Cary Elwes, and John Robinson joined the cast. Domingo was cast after several actors had passed on the role; he was brought into the project by the producer Cassian Elwes. In February 2025, Al Pacino joined the cast.

Principal photography took place in Louisville, Kentucky, in January 2025. It was shot over 19 days; Pacino filmed his part in one day while Domingo shot his in two days.

== Release ==
The film had its world premiere out of competition at the 82nd Venice International Film Festival on September 2, 2025. It was also screened at the Toronto International Film Festival on September 7, 2025, and screened in the special presentations section of the 61st Chicago International Film Festival on October 18, 2025.

On September 9, 2025, Row K Entertainment acquired North American rights to the film as the company's inaugural release and had a limited release on January 9, expanding to a wide release on January 16, 2026. Row K spent $5 million to purchase the film and another $5 million to market it.

== Reception ==
=== Box office ===
The film grossed $154,100 from 14 theaters in its opening weekend. It expanded to 1,101 theaters in its second weekend and grossed $1.23 million over the four day holiday. It was considered a "soft" result. In its third weekend, the film scaled back its release and only earned $181,000 from 621 theaters. In its fourth weekend, the film made $10,672 from 35 theaters. The film was ultimately deemed a box office disappointment, representing millions in losses.

=== Critical response ===
On the review aggregator website Rotten Tomatoes, 91% of 164 critics' reviews are positive, with an average rating of 7.2/10. The website's consensus reads: "Brilliantly offbeat and tinged with a darkly humorous edge, Dead Man's Wire is brought to life by Bill Skarsgård's fearless performance, authentic period flavor, and anti-capitalist fervor." Metacritic, which uses a weighted average, assigned the film a score of 67 out of 100, based on 34 critics, indicating "generally favorable" reviews.

Pete Hammond of Deadline Hollywood wrote that the film feels like "art imitating life both past and present" and cited Skarsgård's performance, calling it "completely convincing and dedicated".

=== Accolades ===
Award	Date of ceremony	Category	Recipient	Result	Ref.
AACTA International Awards	February 6, 2026	Best Supporting Actor	Dacre Montgomery	Nominated	
AARP Movies for Grownups Awards	January 10, 2026	Best Period Film	Dead Man's Wire	Nominated	
Astra Creative Arts Awards	December 11, 2025	Best Stunt Coordinator	Frank Blake	Nominated	
Chicago International Film Festival	October 18, 2025	Visionary Award	Gus Van Sant	Honored	
Denver Film Festival	November 4, 2025	Excellence in Directing Award	Gus Van Sant	Honored	
Miami Film Festival	November 3, 2025	Precious Gem Award	Gus Van Sant	Honored	
