= Family Gay =

- Family Guy episode
- Episode no.: Season 7 Episode 8
- Directed by: Brian Iles
- Written by: Richard Appel
- Production code: 6ACX12
- Original air date: March 8, 2009

Guest appearances
- Seth Rogen as Peter under the "Seth Rogen gene"; Meredith Baxter as herself; John G. Brennan as Scott/Mort Goldman; Wellesley Wild as Various

Episode chronology
← Previous "Ocean's Three and a Half"	Next → "The Juice Is Loose"
- Family Guy season 7

"Family Gay" is the eighth episode in the seventh season of the American animated television series Family Guy. It originally aired on the Fox network in the United States on March 8, 2009. In the episode, to help pay off debt, Peter participates in a series of medical drug tests including one in which he is injected with an experimental gene that renders him gay.

The episode was written by Richard Appel and directed by series regular Brian Iles. Seth Rogen provided a guest-voice as Peter under the effects of the "Seth Rogen gene" and Meredith Baxter provided a guest voice as herself. It received divided reviews from television sources and critics, in addition to receiving criticism from the Parents Television Council. "Family Gay", along with two other episodes, was nominated in the "Outstanding Comedy Series" category for the 2009 61st Primetime Emmy Awards.

== Plot ==
While on his way to buy groceries, Peter instead buys a brain-damaged horse, which not only disturbs everyone but also causes $100,000 worth of damage when Peter enters it in a race and it goes on a rampage. Though the horse ends up dying of a heart attack and Peter disposes of the body by flinging it into Mort Goldman's pharmacy, the Griffins are in debt for initial damages. In order to pay for the damage, Peter decides to participate in a series of medical drug tests, including one in which he is injected with an experimental gene that renders him gay.

Lois is initially upset that Peter is now gay, but she warms up to the change when he begins exhibiting stereotypical gay behaviors like shopping for clothes and cooking muffins, only to reconsider her stance when Peter rejects her sexual advances. Upon learning that the effects of the gene may be permanent, she decides to make the best of things when Peter suddenly leaves her for a man named Scott. Seeing Lois heartbroken and depressed, Stewie (who is implied to be bisexual) and Brian (who is hesitant due to his support of gay rights) attempt to bring Peter back to his normal self by kidnapping him and sending him to a straight camp for conversion therapy.

When Scott comes over looking for Peter, Brian admits his actions. Lois states that she is willing to accept Peter the way he is now and takes him out of the straight camp, telling him to go back to Scott. However, the effects of the gene wear off right when Peter is in the middle of an orgy with Scott and nine other men. Peter returns to his family, and they agree to never speak of the incident again. The episode ends when Mort throws the horse's dead body through the Griffins' living room window in revenge for throwing it into his store.

== Production ==
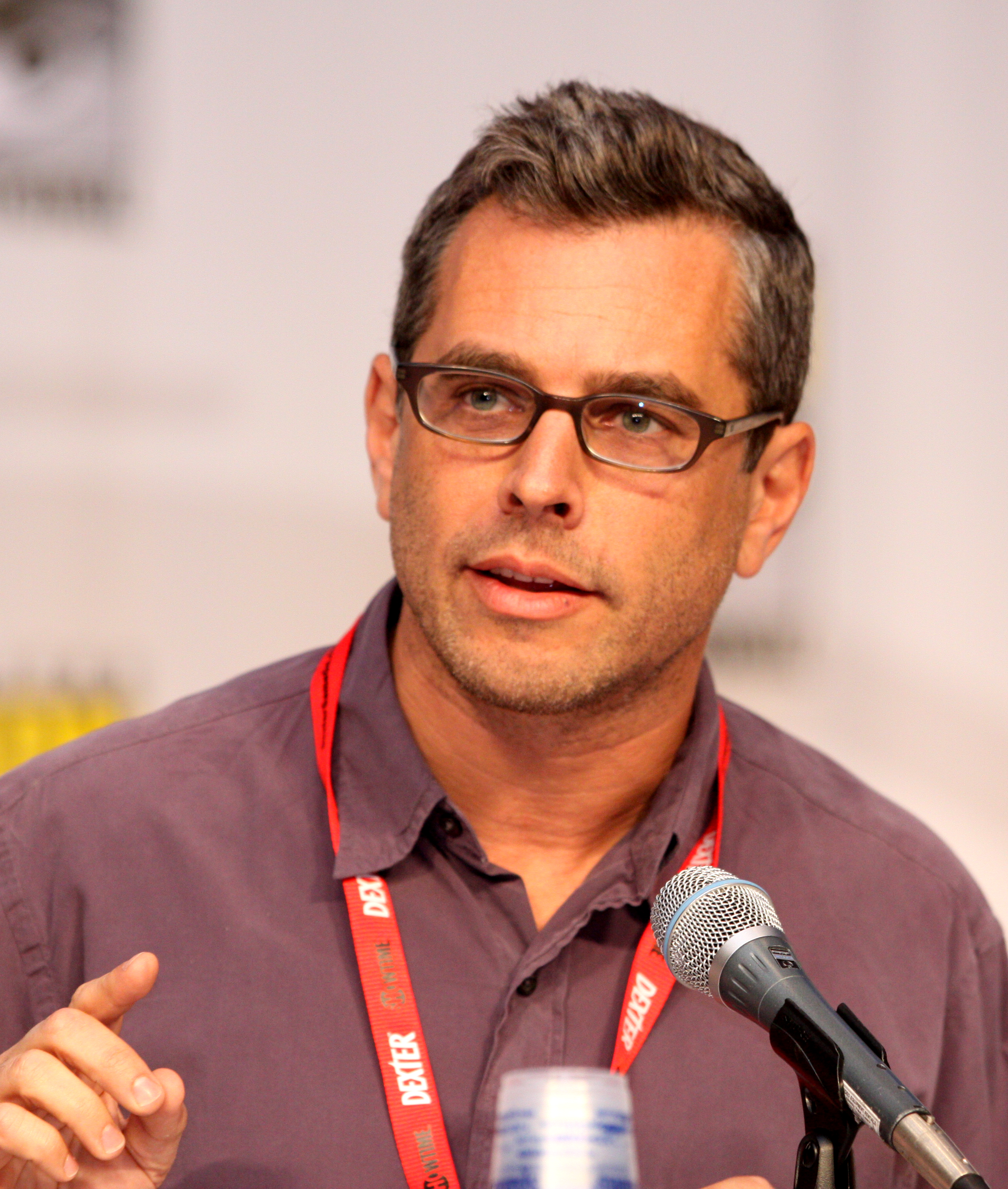
"Family Gay" was executive producer Richard Appel's first writing credit during his time on Family Guy.

"Family Gay" was written by at the time Executive Producer and future co-creator of the Family Guy spin-off The Cleveland Show, Richard Appel. This episode being his first and to date his only writing credit on the show. John Viener worked as the executive story editor for the episode. MacFarlane found a list of plot ideas from the third season that says "Peter goes gay" and he decided to make an episode with that premise. The writers originally wanted to take "the high road" with the episode. In the first draft, Peter's homosexuality was so subtle, that he just appeared a little more refined. When the writers could not come up with any high road jokes, they "went with what they know". The writers had fun "gaying up the episode" by including Peter in a different outfit during every scene after he turned gay. The writers wanted to further the idea that sexuality is inborn, not chosen.

The episode was directed by Brian Iles. He was assisted by James Purdum and Peter Shin worked as the supervising directors for the episode. Other crew members that collaborated in the animation of the episode included Deborah Cone who directed the retake of the episode and Kenji Ono who was the assistant director of the episode. Iles sketched out several clothing ideas for Peter to wear. He got ideas by flipping through catalogs. The name of all the horses at the race track are named after canceled Fox shows from May 2005 until this episode aired. It is a tribute to a similar mentioning of canceled shows when Family Guy came back on the air in May 2005 in the episode "North by North Quahog". When the episode got close to airing, MacFarlane kept thinking they should remove the cutaway gag with Matt Damon, due to MacFarlane liking Damon's criticism of Sarah Palin.

"Family Gay", along with the first eight episodes of the seventh season were released on DVD by 20th Century Fox in the United States and Canada on June 16, 2009, one month after it had completed broadcast on television. The "Volume 7" DVD release features bonus material including deleted scenes, animatics, and commentaries for every episode. The DVD also includes four special features those being, Take me out to place tonight; Family Guy Cribz; Comic-Con 2008 Family Guy panel and the Family Guy Art Show.

All the main Family Guy cast members lent their voices to the episode, along with writers Kirker Butler, John Viener, Alec Sulkin, Mark Hentemann, and Danny Smith, who all had minor speaking roles. Peter's boyfriend Scott was voiced by recurring voice actor John G. Brennan, who voices him in the same way he voices gay The Jerky Boys character Jack Tors. Other guest stars included writer Wellesley Wild, actress Meredith Baxter-Birney, and actor Seth Rogen.

== Cultural references ==
The episode begins with Peter playing the 1983 video game Dragon's Lair. Later in the episode, Peter names his horse "Till' Death", in reference to the show of the same name, highlighting shows that were all cancelled by Fox, including Arrested Development and The War at Home, amongst others. Peter also learns about a pomegranate martini from InStyle magazine. "Family Gay" references, in a cutaway, James Bond's iconic ability to persuade women to have sex with him despite their initial resistance. Peter and Brian watch the movie Wild Hogs, which Peter predicts will suck. The western spoof film Blazing Saddles is referenced when Peter and the other men are dancing and singing, "The French Mistake". "Family Gay" makes two references to musicals. While in the doctor's office, Peter's doctor makes a reference to the song "Seasons of Love" from the musical Rent and while reading Flowers in the Attic by V. C. Andrews Peter is wearing a Hello Kitty shirt and listens to the song "Sixteen Going on Seventeen" from the musical The Sound of Music, sung by Charmian Carr.

== Reception ==
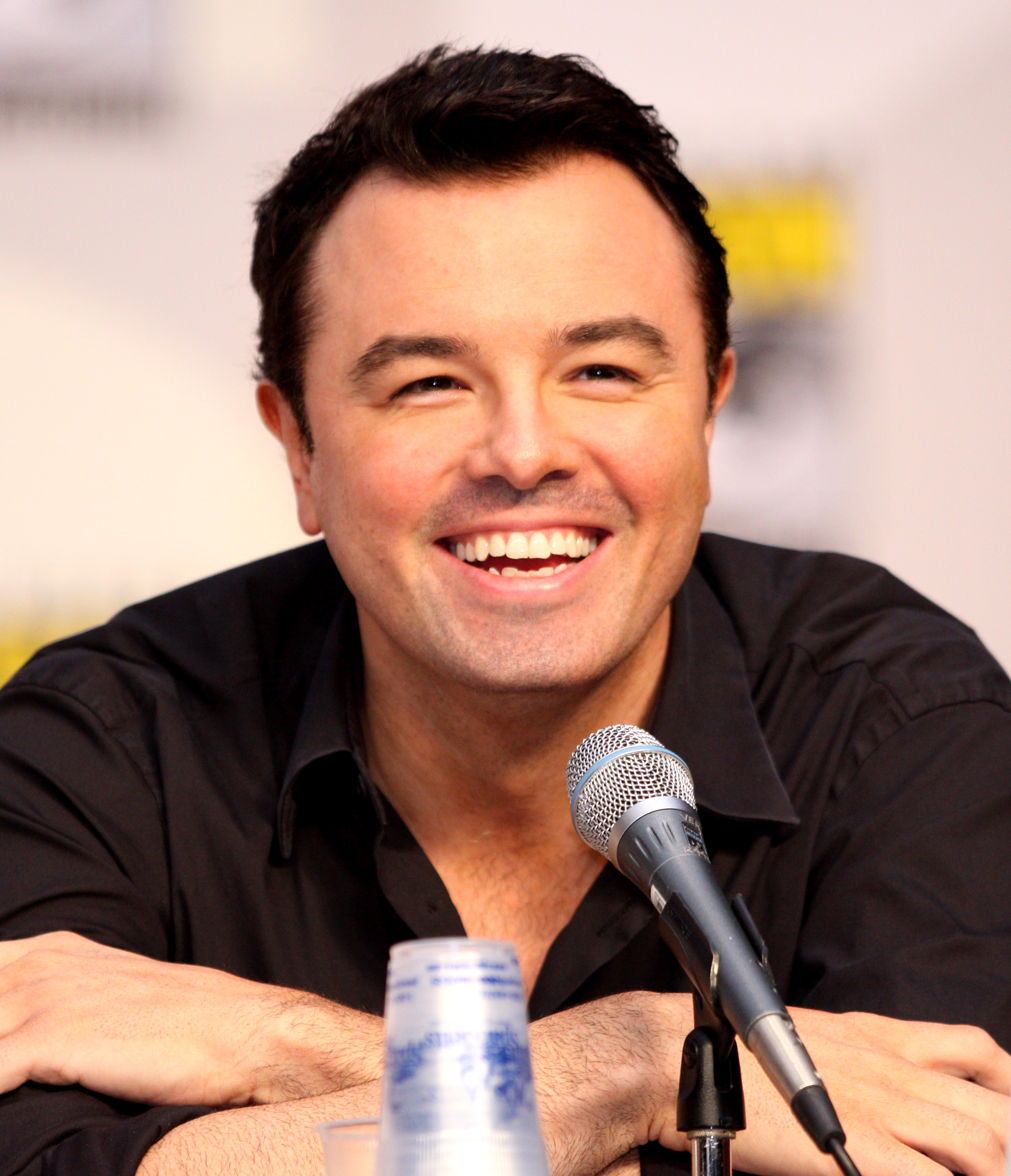
Show creator Seth MacFarlane submitted "Family Gay" along with "I Dream of Jesus" and "Road to Germany" for the "Outstanding Comedy Series" category, Family Guy was later nominated in the category.

The episode received a 4.2/6 Nielsen rating, indicating that 4.2% of American households watched the episode, and that 6% of all televisions in use at the time were tuned into it. "Family Gay", along with "I Dream of Jesus" and "Road to Germany", were nominated in the "Outstanding Comedy Series" category for the 2009 61st Primetime Emmy Awards. Series creator Seth MacFarlane commented "We picked three of our edgier shows as a choice. Ya know, we figured if we are going to be damned, let's be damned for what we really are." Much to the surprise of the writing staff, the series was ultimately nominated for the award, the first time in 48 years an animated series was nominated for the same category since The Flintstones in 1961, but lost to The Jack Benny Show. though The Simpsons were almost nominated in the year 1993, but that changed since Emmy voters were hesitant to pit cartoons against live action programs.

The episode received divided reviews from critics. Ahsan Haque of IGN rated the episode a 7.9/10, saying, "Overall, while it's far from being the funniest episode of the season, there were more than enough laughs and uncomfortable moments to make this episode entertaining." He went on to say that the episode could have been more though, due to the fact that the show has used many clever gay jokes in the past. Likewise, Alex Rocha of TV Guide commented, "'Family Gay' fell way short of my expectations. Even with its traditional pop culture references and flashbacks, this week's episode could not simply keep me tuned in. I'll admit, I did manage to laugh at times, but as in previous times, Family Guy simply fell short again." Steve Heisler from The A.V. Club gave the episode a negative review, calling it "yet another pointless exercise in Family Guy insider smugness", and rating it C−.

In March 2009, the Parents Television Council (PTC), a conservative decency campaigning group, filed an indecency complaint to the Federal Communications Commission (FCC). PTC President Tim Winter stated, "Fox treated viewers to everything from an 'eleven-way' gay orgy to baby Stewie possibly eating a bowl of cereal with horse semen instead of milk." Dan Isett, PTC director of public policy, said that this was the first time since last fall that the PTC had asked its members to send complaints to the FCC, although the PTC regularly discusses issues it has with shows. The PTC named "Family Gay" the "Worst TV Show of the Week" for the week of March 13. MacFarlane responded to the PTC's decrees against the show in an interview with The Advocate, "For an organization that prides itself on Christian values — I mean, I’m an atheist, so what do I know? — they spend their entire day hating people."
