= Cathy Cahlin Ryan =

American actress

- Born: Miami, Florida
- Occupation: Actress
- Years active: 1992–present
- Spouse: Shawn Ryan (m. 1998)
- Children: 2

Cathy Cahlin Ryan is an American actress. She played the role of Corrine Mackey on the police drama The Shield in all seven seasons, and was credited as part of the main cast during seasons 5-7.

== Early years ==
Ryan is a native of Miami, Florida. She began acting when she was a high school student, and she was a theater major at Florida Atlantic University.

== Career ==
Ryan's early experience included acting with theater troupes in south Florida and making commercials. Products that she promoted included cruise lines and Honda. She also made training films for Burger King.

She has also appeared in the television productions Numb3rs, Judging Amy, Family Matters, Monk, The Unit, Severence Pay, Roseanne: Portrait of a Domestic Goddess, Lie to Me (Season 2, Episode 19), The Chicago Code and a guest appearance as a woman taken hostage on Slaughterhouse, the Justified season 3 finale.

Ryan moved to Los Angeles in 1993. She acted on stage there and worked as a substitute teacher between stage roles.

== Personal life ==
She is married to Shawn Ryan, creator of The Shield and The Chicago Code.

== Filmography ==
=== Film ===
Year	Title	Role	Notes
2008	Redbelt	Gini Collins	
2013	The Trials of Cate McCall	Ms. Timmins	

=== Television ===
Year	Title	Role	Notes
1992	Seinfeld	Hippie Girl	Uncredited
1994	Roseanne: An Unauthorized Biography	Babysitter	Uncredited
2005	Judging Amy	Unknown	Guest Star
2007	The Unit	Karen	Guest Star
2008	Monk	Gloria Morales	Guest Star
2002-2008	The Shield	Corrine Mackey	TV
2009	Project: Rant	Unknown	uncredited
2009	Numb3rs	Linda Parker (uncredited)	Guest Star
2009	Family Guy	Fred Goldman's Wife	Guest Voice
2011	Lie to Me	Beth Lansford	Guest Star
2011	The Chicago Code	Anna Chase	Guest Star
2012	Justified	Guest Star	TV
2018	Timeless	Mom (voice)	Voice
2020	Searching for Josh Brolin in the Apocalypse		
2017-22	S.W.A.T	Dr. Wendy Hughes	TV
2022	Get in Get Out	Shopper	
