= Shawn Ryan =

American writer and television producer

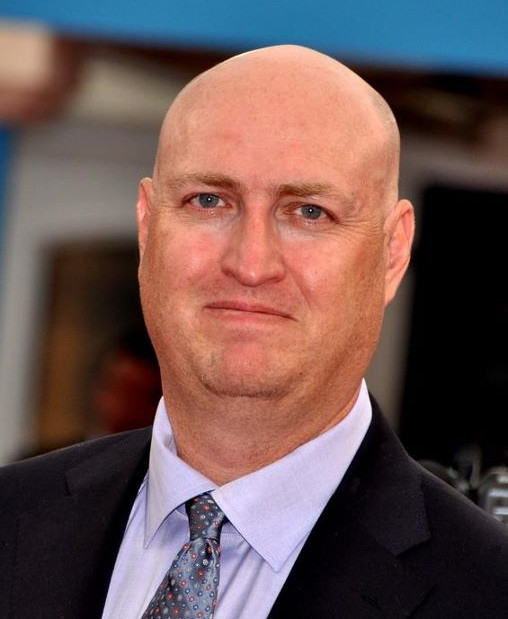
- Ryan in 2011
- Born: 1966 or 1967 (age 59–60); Rockford, Illinois, U.S.
- Education: Middlebury College
- Occupations: Screenwriter; television producer
- Spouse: Cathy Cahlin Ryan
- Children: 2

Shawn Ryan (born 1966 or 1967) is an American screenwriter and television producer. He has created and/or produced a number of television series including The Shield (2002–08), The Unit (2006–09), Lie to Me (2009–11), Timeless (2016–18), S.W.A.T. (2017–25) and The Night Agent (2023–present).

== Early life ==
Ryan was born in Rockford, Illinois. His mother is a schoolteacher and his father is a CPA. He said he had "a very good family upbringing" and was interested in 1970s sitcoms as a child. He graduated from Middlebury College in 1988.

== Career ==
Ryan got his start in television when he entered and won the Norman Lear Playwriting award sponsored by Columbia Pictures Television (which later became Sony). The award included a $25,000 cash gift and meetings with Columbia's top television producers. Later he was a staff writer on the show Nash Bridges and served as a writer/producer on Angel before creating and acting as head writer on The Shield. He was partnered with David Mamet to serve as showrunner for The Unit.

Ryan was set to executive produce Confessions of a Contractor, a 2009 CBS television pilot based on Richard Murphy's book of the same name. The story centres on a successful L.A. contractor who becomes involved with two of his female clients. The production was put on hold when casting contingencies could not be met. He was the showrunner for season 2 of Fox's Lie to Me. He was the showrunner and executive producer of FX's Terriers. He created the crime drama The Chicago Code. In 2012, Ryan's pilot Last Resort got picked up by ABC for the fall. On November 21, 2012, producers were given notice of the network's plans not to pick the show up for a full season and reworked the final episode to function as a series finale and give the fans closure.

In January 2013, CBS picked up Beverly Hills Cop, an hourlong crime procedural with comedic elements, with Ryan on board to pen the script and executive produce along with his MiddKid Productions partner Marney Hochman and Eddie Murphy. The potential series was a follow-up to the Murphy franchise and centered on Foley's son, Aaron (played by Brandon T. Jackson), a cop working in Beverly Hills as he tries to escape his famous father's shadow. Barry Sonnenfeld directed the pilot. In May 2013, CBS announced it would not pick up the show.

== Personal life ==
Ryan is married to actress Cathy Cahlin Ryan, who starred on The Shield and The Chicago Code. They have two children.

== Filmography ==
=== Film ===
- Welcome to Hollywood (1998) (screenplay and story)
- Terminator Salvation (2009) (uncredited script revisions)

=== Television ===
Year	Title	Network	Creator	Writer	Executive Producer	Notes
1990	My Two Dads	NBC	No	Yes	No	
1997–98	Life with Louie	Fox	No	Yes	Yes	
1997–2000	Nash Bridges	CBS	No	Yes	No	Co-producer only
2000–01	Angel	The WB	No	Yes	No	Producer only
2002–08	The Shield	FX	Yes	Yes	Yes	
2006–09	The Unit	CBS	No	Yes	Yes	
2010	Lie to Me	Fox	No	Yes	Yes	
2010	Terriers	FX	No	Yes	Yes	
2011	The Chicago Code	Fox	Yes	Yes	Yes	
2012–13	Last Resort	ABC	Yes	Yes	Yes	
2015–16	Mad Dogs	Amazon Prime Video	No	Yes	Yes	
2016–17	The Get Down	Netflix	No	No	Yes	
2016–18	Timeless	NBC	Yes	Yes	Yes	
2017–25	S.W.A.T.	CBS	Developer	Yes	Yes	
2023–present	The Night Agent	Netflix	Yes	Yes	Yes	
2026–present	American Hostage	MGM+	Yes	Yes	Yes	

== Awards and nominations ==
Ryan was nominated for a Primetime Emmy Award for Outstanding Writing for a Drama Series in 2002 for the pilot episode of The Shield. He was nominated for a Humanitas Prize (Children's Animation) for Life with Louie in 1998.

== External links & further reading ==
- Shawn Ryan at IMDb
- "Interview with Shawn Ryan about his path to success". The Days of Yore. September 5, 2011.
- "Interview of Shawn Ryan". Writers Guild. Archived from the original on June 6, 2011.
- "Profile of Shawn Ryan". Los Angeles Times.
