= Mike Flynt =

American football player and coach

Mike Flynt is an American former college football player who played linebacker for NCAA Division III Sul Ross State University in Alpine, Texas and wore the number 49. Flynt was a strength coach by trade and was a strength coach at Nebraska, Oregon, and Texas A&M. He is the inventor of the Powerbase Fitness exercise equipment. Clients for the Powerbase system include school systems and the military.

== Early career ==
In 1965, he was on the first state championship team at Permian High School in Odessa, Texas, the high school featured in Friday Night Lights. Flynt, as an All-District player for Permian High School, was offered several full football scholarships at places like the University of Houston and Sul Ross State University. However, he initially attended Ranger Junior College for one semester instead.

He later attended Sul Ross State in 1969, which was a member of the NAIA. The athletic highlight of Flynt's two years at Sul Ross was participating in a victory against Texas A&I, which went on to win the 1969 NAIA Football National Championship, with its only loss being to Sul Ross. Flynt had been a team captain, All-Conference Linebacker and the leading tackler on the Sul Ross team as a junior.

At the start of his senior year in 1971, Flynt was involved in a fist fight with a freshman teammate, the last of several fights he got into on campus. School officials decided to expel Flynt. He needed only six credit hours to graduate, and he earned his degree from Sul Ross State by taking his remaining classes elsewhere. At a reunion of former Sul Ross students from the 1960s and '70s, Flynt told a former roommate that losing his senior year at Sul Ross was the greatest regret in his life. The roommate suggested he make a comeback. Flynt accepted the challenge and ended up walking on at Sul Ross as a linebacker, making the team and becoming the oldest college linebacker in NCAA history.

== Division III football ==
Flynt sold his house in Franklin, Tennessee and moved temporarily to Alpine, Texas.

When Flynt went back to play, his youngest child was a freshman at the University of Tennessee. Two of his children were older than any of his teammates.

Flynt was eight years older than his own coach, Steve Wright. One of his original college coaches, Jerry Larned, counselled him at the start of his comeback. Despite the fact that he was over 35 years older than his teammates, Flynt, a career strength and conditioning coach, told Sports Illustrated that he could still do some things in the weight room that the other players could not. Flynt said he could still do 25 consecutive pull-ups and won a bench press competition with a 45 lb plate at the beginning of the 2007 season.

He missed the first two games of the 2007 season with a pinched nerve, which turned out to be two bulging discs in his neck.

When he made his debut on October 13, 2007, Flynt was believed to be the second-oldest college football player ever. Older players such as Tom Thompson have also since surpassed Flynt in age.

== Adaptation ==
The Senior, a 2023 film directed by Rod Lurie and starring Michael Chiklis as Mike Flynt, premiered at the Fort Lauderdale International Film Festival on November 9, 2023. The film's theatrical release, nation-wide, was by Angel Studios on September 19, 2025.
