= Kyra Davis =

American novelist (born 1972)

Kyra Davis Lurie
- Born: August 23, 1972 (age 54); Santa Clara, California, U.S.
- Education: Fashion Institute of Design & Merchandising; Fashion Institute of Technology
- Occupations: Writer, novelist
- Spouse: Rod Lurie
- Children: 3
- Writing career
- Pen name: Kyra Davis, Kyra Davis Lurie
- Genres: Mystery, Chick lit, Women's fiction, Romance, Literary fiction
- Notable works: Sophie Katz, Just One Night, The Great Mann
- Website: kyradavislurie.com

Kyra Davis Lurie, née Kyra Davis (born August 23, 1972) is an American novelist. She is best known for her Just One Night trilogy and the Sophie Katz mystery series, as well as the 2025 novel The Great Mann, a literary re-interpretation of The Great Gatsby and the first work published under her married name, Kyra Davis Lurie.

In 2013 Anonymous Content optioned Davis' Just One Night trilogy with the intent to develop it into a television series.

== Biography ==
Davis was born in Santa Clara, California, to a Jewish single mother who raised Davis with the help of family. She was named after Kira Argounova, the protagonist in Ayn Rand's novel We The Living. Her father was African-American and her mother was of Eastern European descent, giving Davis a mixed heritage. Davis attended the Fashion Institute of Design & Merchandising and Fashion Institute of Technology, during which time she met and married her first husband. Davis later attended the Golden Gate University, where she graduated with a bachelor's degree in business and humanities. In 2001 Davis filed for divorce. Davis began writing the Sophie Katz series due to the stress resulting from the divorce and published her first novel through Red Dress Ink in 2005. In 2013 Davis published the Just One Night trilogy through Simon & Schuster's digital imprint.

Davis lives in Los Angeles, California, with her son and her husband, director and screenwriter Rod Lurie, who has two children from a prior relationship. She has two stepchildren from Rod, Paige and Hunter.

== Critical reception ==
Reception to Davis's work has been positive, with "Just One Night" getting a starred review in Publishers Weekly and Lust, Loathing and a Little Lip Gloss being one of GalleyCat's "Featured Book of Color Pick of the Day". The Houston Chronicle praised Sex, Murder and a Double Latte, calling it "a terrific mystery".

So Much For My Happy Ending received positive reviews, with Boston.com saying that the book had a "sensitive, honest, engaging voice".

The Great Mann has so far received very positive reviews, with the Library Journal calling Lurie a "writer to watch" and remarking that "Lurie’s nuanced and sympathetic characters and stellar writing are nearly as brilliant as in Gatsby."

== Bibliography ==
=== Just One Night trilogy ===
- The Stranger (2013)
- Exposed (2013)
- Binding Agreement (2013)
- Just One Night (2013, compilation of all three novellas)
- Just One Lie
- Just One More

=== Pure Sin ===
- Deceptive Innocence (2014, initially released in three parts)
- Dangerous Alliance (2014)

=== Sophie Katz Mysteries ===
- Sex, Murder and a Double Latte (2005)
- Passion, Betrayal And Killer Highlights (2006)
- Obsession, Deceit, and Really Dark Chocolate (2007)
- Lust, Loathing and a Little Lip Gloss (2009)
- Vows, Vendettas and a Little Black Dress (2010)
- Vanity, Vengeance And A Weekend In Vegas (2012)
- Seven Swans A' Shooting (2013)

=== Standalone novels ===
- So Much for My Happy Ending (2006)
- The Great Mann (2025)

=== Non-fiction ===
- Perfectly Plum: Unauthorized Essays On the Life, Loves And Other Disasters of Stephanie Plum, Trenton Bounty Hunter (2007)
- Everything I Needed to Know About Being a Girl I Learned from Judy Blume
