= Michael Chiklis =

American actor (born 1963)

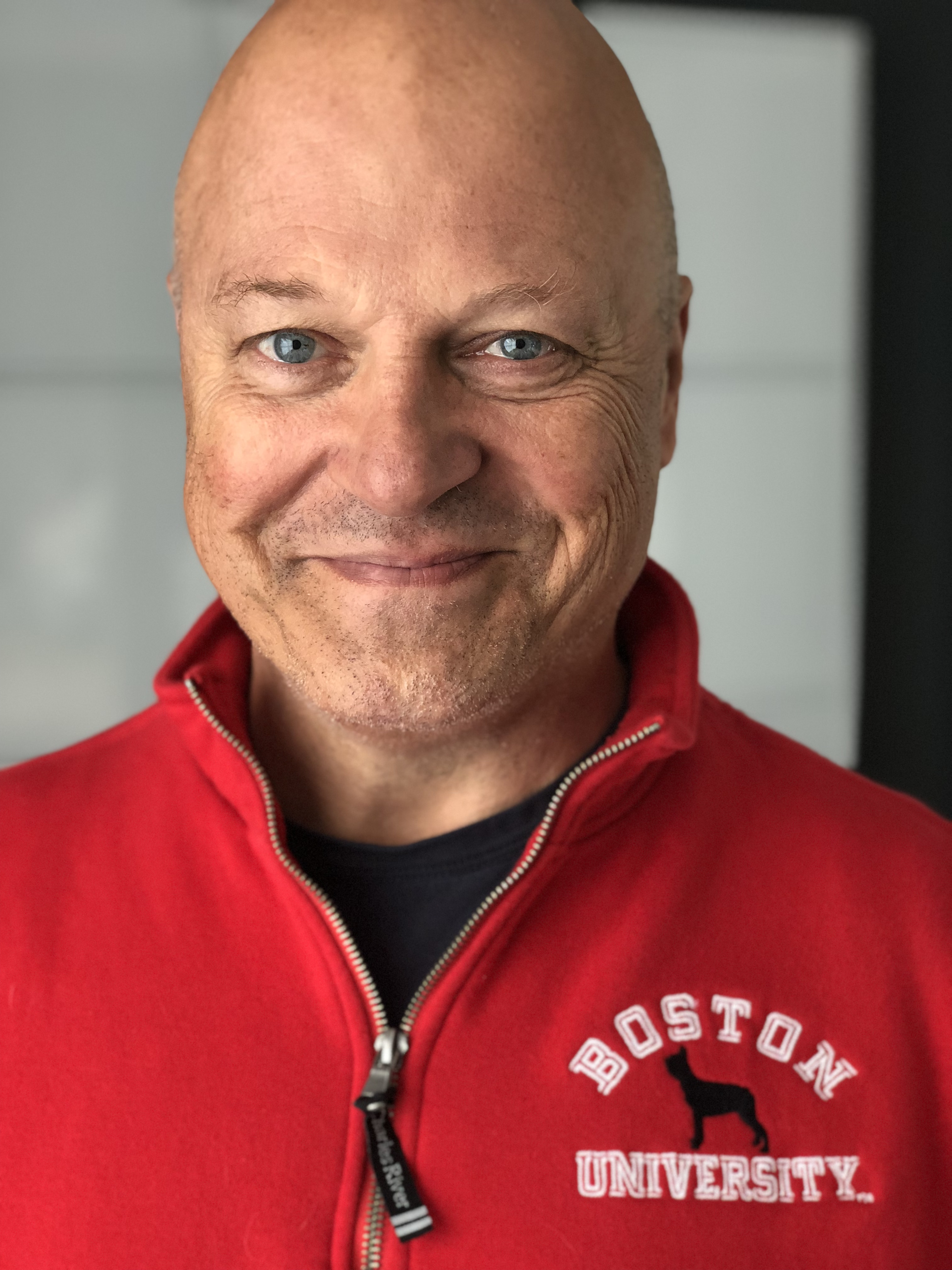
- Chiklis in 2019
- Born: Michael Charles Chiklis; August 30, 1963 (age 63); Lowell, Massachusetts, U.S.
- Education: Boston University (BFA)
- Occupations: Actor, television producer, television director
- Years active: 1989–present
- Spouse: Michelle Moran (m. 1992)
- Children: 2, including Autumn
- Website: michaelchiklis.com

Michael Charles Chiklis (/ˈtʃɪklɪs/; born August 30, 1963) is an American actor, television producer, and director. He is known for his roles as Los Angeles Police Department (LAPD) Detective Vic Mackey on the FX police drama The Shield (2002–2008), for which he won the Primetime Emmy Award for Outstanding Lead Actor in a Drama Series in 2002 and Golden Globe Award for Best Actor – Television Series Drama in 2003, and as superhero Ben Grimm / the Thing in Fantastic Four (2005) and Fantastic Four: Rise of the Silver Surfer (2007).

Other notable television roles of his include Commissioner Tony Scali on The Commish (1991–1996), Dell Toledo on American Horror Story: Freak Show (2014–2015), Nathaniel Barnes on Gotham (2015–2017), and Red Auerbach on Winning Time (2022–2023). He has appeared in films such as Eagle Eye (2008), Hubie Halloween (2020), and Don't Look Up (2021).

== Early life ==
Chiklis was born on August 30, 1963, in Lowell, Massachusetts. His mother, Katherine (née Vousboukis) (1939–2019), was a hospital administrative aide, and his father, Charles P. ("Charlie") Chiklis (1939–2020), ran a hair and beauty salon. Chiklis has been described as having inherited his acting ability from his mother. His father was a second-generation Greek American (his paternal ancestors came from Lesbos), and his mother was of Greek and Irish descent. Chiklis grew up in Andover, Massachusetts and began entertaining his family with celebrity imitations when he was five years old.

As a child, Chiklis appeared in regional theater productions and became a member of the Actors' Equity Association at age 13. In the ninth grade, he portrayed Hawkeye Pierce in Andover High School's production of M*A*S*H. He graduated from Boston University College of Fine Arts with a Bachelor of Fine Arts.

== Career ==
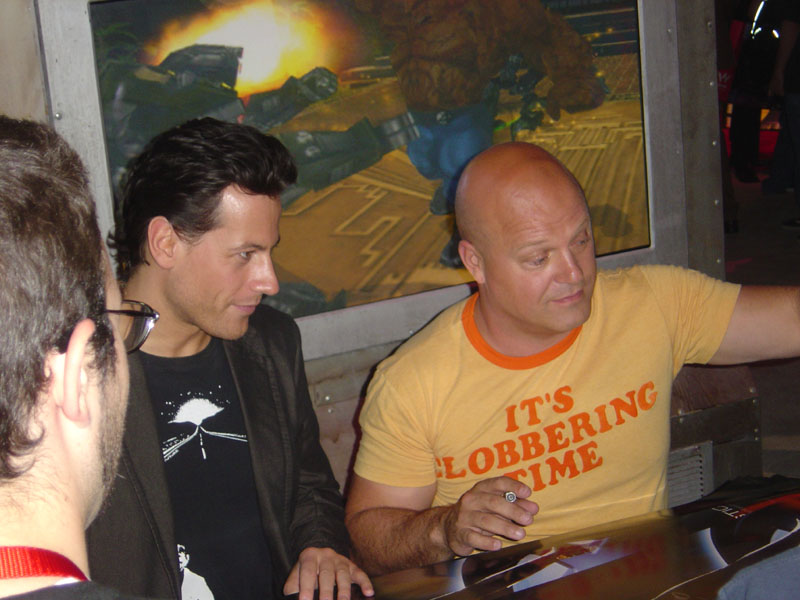
Chiklis (right) with Ioan Gruffudd in 2005

After graduating from Boston University, Chiklis moved to Brooklyn, New York, and was cast in the role of John Belushi in the controversial biopic Wired (1989). The film was panned in general and flopped at the box office, though Chiklis's performance as Belushi (one of his idols) was highly praised. He also guest starred in several popular television series such as Miami Vice, B.L. Stryker, Wiseguy, L.A. Law, Murphy Brown, and Seinfeld, as well as in bit parts in such films as Nixon.

Chiklis' first successful role was in The Commish, a police comedy/drama that ran from 1991 to 1996 on ABC. Chiklis played Anthony "Tony" J. Scali, a police commissioner in a small city in upstate New York. After The Commish, Chiklis starred in the short-lived NBC sitcom Daddio.

In 1997, Chiklis replaced Rob Becker in the Broadway one-man show Defending the Caveman, taking on the role from January 1997 to the show's closing in June 1997.

After playing Curly Howard in the TV film The Three Stooges (2000), Chiklis decided to reinvent his image. With his wife's help, he spent six months on an extensive workout regimen and shaved his head. He turned up to audition for The Shield looking nothing like the pudgy, friendly character of The Commish. Chiklis won over creator Shawn Ryan and nabbed the leading role of the show's anti-hero, LAPD Detective Vic Mackey. He won the 2002 Emmy Award for Outstanding Lead Actor In A Drama Series for the role. Chiklis received a Golden Globe Award that same year for Best Performance by an Actor in a Television Series-Drama as well. Between 2004 and 2005, he was nominated for a Golden Globe for Best Actor in a Drama Series but did not win. Chiklis later parodied his role as Vic Mackey in the Robot Chicken episode, "Monstourage"; the skit involved Mackey accidentally switching places with Ben Grimm.

Since 2000, Chiklis has taken up a number of voice roles, voicing Chihiro's father, Akio, in the English dub of Hayao Miyazaki's Spirited Away and Roman/King Webster in the direct-to-video feature The Adventures of Tom Thumb and Thumbelina. He has also performed in several episodes of Family Guy and had a voice role in Heavy Gear: The Animated Series.

In 2005, he starred in Fantastic Four (2005) as Thing and reprised the role in its sequel, Fantastic Four: Rise of the Silver Surfer (2007). A fan of the comic book series, he had dreamed of playing the character if ever a Fantastic Four film were produced. Chiklis was often praised for his performance in a film that otherwise earned mixed reviews.

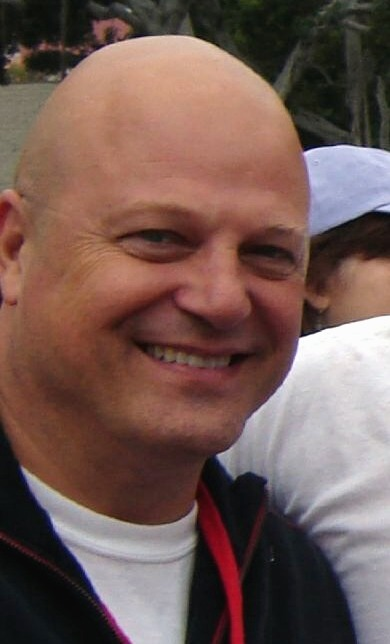
Chiklis in 2010

In the film Eagle Eye (2008), Chiklis portrays the United States Secretary of Defense.

In the wake of the Bernie Madoff scandal, Chiklis was developing a series at FX about a similar investment scheme. The project, called House of Cards, concerns a group committing an elaborate scam similar to the Madoff fraud. Chiklis had been developing the project since February 2008 after he and his wife became victims of a Ponzi scheme themselves. Chiklis planned to executive produce but not star.

Chiklis later starred in the ABC television series No Ordinary Family, which premiered on September 28, 2010, as part of the 2010–2011 television season and ended in April 2011. He also co-starred in the CBS crime drama Vegas.

In March 2014, it was announced that Chiklis had been cast in American Horror Story: Freak Show, season 4 of the FX anthology series.

In 2014, Chiklis played a small part towards the end of the FX series Sons of Anarchy. He appears first in the episode "Rose Red", as a trucker who first encounters Gemma, who is on her way to her father, at a truck stop. He also plays a truck driver in the series finale.

In 2015, he appeared in Gotham as Captain Nathaniel Barnes. In a nod to Chiklis' time on the Strike Team on The Shield, his character established a similarly named "Strike Force".

In September 2016, Chiklis released his first solo album, INFLUENCE, in the rock and roll genre. He wrote and produced the album at his own Extravaganza Music Studio.

== Personal life ==
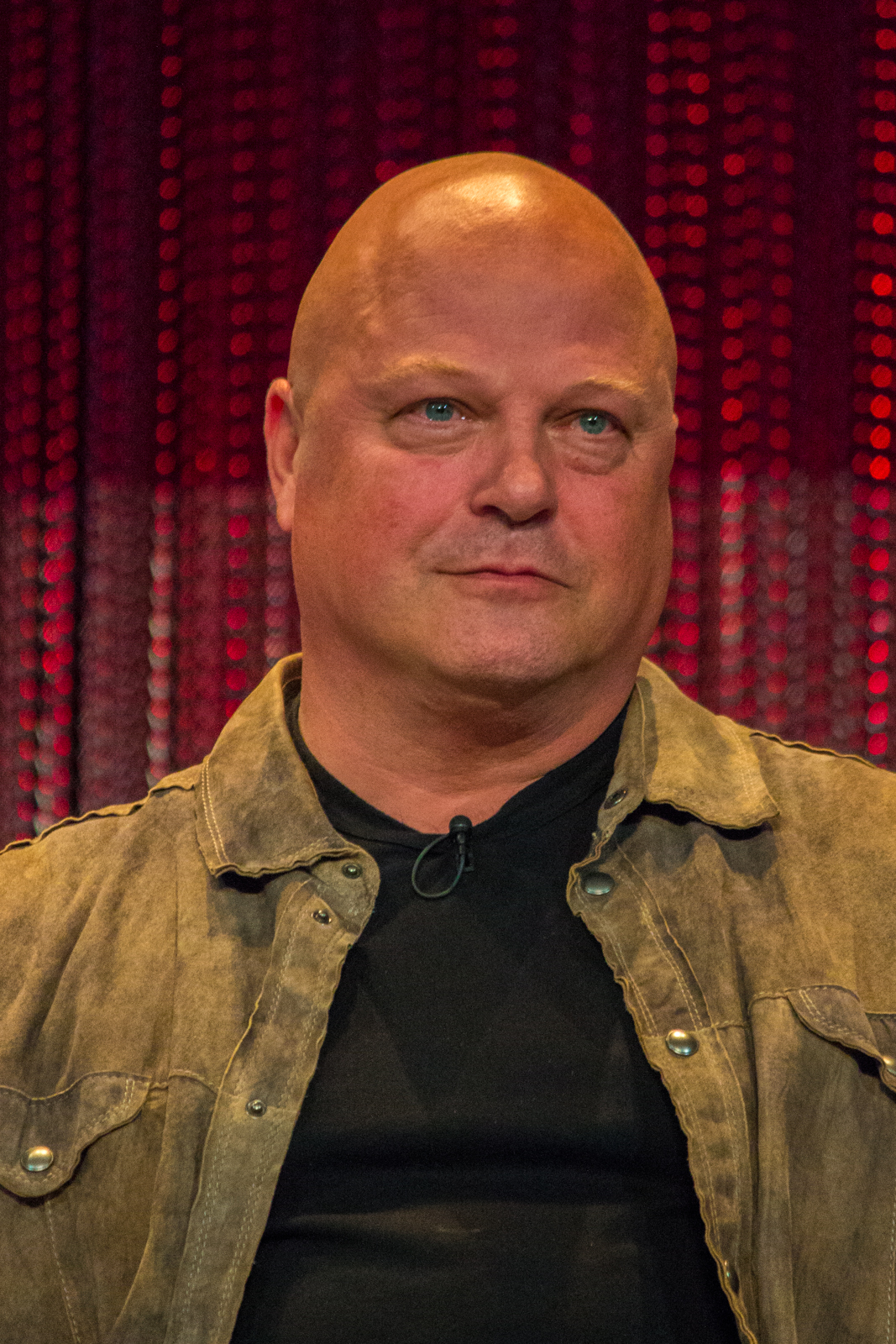
Chiklis in 2014

Chiklis married Michelle Moran on June 21, 1992, and they have two daughters: Autumn, born on October 9, 1993, and Odessa, born on March 26, 1999. Autumn played Vic Mackey's daughter Cassidy on The Shield.

A lifelong comic book fan who especially enjoyed the Fantastic Four prior to his role as Ben Grimm, it was reported in 2010 that Chiklis rarely turns down an autograph request from children.

Chiklis is a fan of the Boston Celtics, Boston Red Sox, New England Patriots, and the Boston Bruins, was interviewed for the HBO documentary The Curse of the Bambino about the Red Sox's long struggle to win the World Series, and narrated the video introduction of the New England Patriots in Super Bowl XXXIX.

Chiklis is also an accomplished musician, specializing in drums and vocals, but also playing guitar and bass. He is a member of several performing bands in the Boston area such as The Surgeon General, Best Kept Secret, and Double Talk. He has starred in and produced films through his own production company, Extravaganza.

In 2011, Chiklis and his band MCB released their first single "Til I Come Home", a tribute song to the soldiers overseas. The song was used in his TV series No Ordinary Family in 2011. MCB's prior music includes another single, "Make Me High", written for the independent film High School (2010), starring Chiklis, Adrien Brody, Colin Hanks, and Matt Bush; the single was released in spring 2011.

Following his stint on American Horror Story: Freak Show, Chiklis told Larry King that he did not enjoy working on the show: "That was one of the darkest years of my career. It was, I think, it's one thing to do a horror film in the context of like two months or something like that, but to live in that for six months it just became, I don't know. Maybe it's because I'm an empathetic person, and I just sometimes start to take things on. But it was so dark, and it was so nasty."

=== Philanthropy ===
Chiklis has participated in celebrity Texas hold 'em poker tournaments to benefit comedian Brad Garrett's charity foundation, Maximum Hope. Chiklis has worked closely with many different charities over the years including The Children's Lifesaving Foundation, Alzheimer's Association, Autism Speaks and the Revlon Run Walk.

== Filmography ==
=== Film ===
Year	Title	Role	Notes
1989	Wired	John Belushi	
1990	The Rain Killer	Reese	
1995	Nixon	TV Director	
1998	Body and Soul	'Tiny' O'Toole	
1998	Taxman	Andre Rubakov	
1998	Soldier	Jimmy Pig	
1999	Carlo's Wake	Marco	
1999	St. Michael's Crossing	Benjamin Arensen	
1999	Last Request	Victim	Short film
1999	Do Not Disturb	Hartman	
2002	Spirited Away	Chihiro's Father (voice)	English dub
2002	The Adventures of Tom Thumb and Thumbelina	King Webster (voice)	
2005	Fantastic Four	Ben Grimm / The Thing	
2007	Rise: Blood Hunter	Clyde Rawlins	
2007	Fantastic Four: Rise of the Silver Surfer	Ben Grimm / The Thing	
2008	Eagle Eye	Secretary of Defense George Callister	
2008	The Legend of Secret Pass	Calabar (voice)	
2010	High School	Dr. Leslie Gordon	
2013	Parker	Melander	
2013	Pawn	Derrick	
2014	When the Game Stands Tall	Terry Eidson	
2016	The Do-Over	Carmine	
2016	Rupture	Bald Man	
2017	Fallen	Narrator	Documentary
2018	1985	Dale Lester	
2018	MFKZ	Crocodile (voice)	English dub
2019	10 Minutes Gone	Frank	
2020	Hubie Halloween	Father Dave	
2021	Don't Look Up	Dan Pawketty	
2023	The Senior	Mike Flynt	
2026	The Mongoose	Pope	
TBA	Tyrant	TBA	Post-production
TBA	The Decline of Fucking Western Civilization	TBA	Filming

=== Television ===
Year	Title	Role	Notes
1989	Miami Vice	Jeffrey Whitehead	Episode: "The Lost Madonna"
1989	B.L. Stryker	Unknown	Episode: "Blues for Buder"
1989	Wiseguy	Carlo Spoletta	4 episodes
1990	Murphy Brown	Tony Rocket	Episode: "Brown and Blue"
1990	Maverick Square	Nicky "Fat Nicky"	Television film
1990–1991	L.A. Law	Jimmy Hoffs	2 episodes
1991	Seinfeld	Steve Pocatello	Episode: "The Stranded"
1991–1996	The Commish	Police Commissioner Tony Scali	92 episodes
1998	Touched by an Angel	Matt Colletti	Episode: "Breaking Bread"
2000	Godzilla: The Series	Colonel Charles Tarrington	Voice, episode: "Where Is Thy Sting?"
2000	Daddio	Chris Woods	15 episodes
2000	The Three Stooges	Curly Howard	Television film
2000–2001	Family Guy	Various Characters	Voice, 4 episodes
2001	Heavy Gear: The Animated Series	Lieutenant Jan Agusta	Voice, main role
2002–2008	The Shield	Detective Vic Mackey	88 episodes
2003	Stuart Little	Scar	Voice, episode: "No Job is Too Little"
2008	Robot Chicken	Vic Mackey, The Thing, Doc, Detective	Voice, episode: "Monstourage"
2010–2011	No Ordinary Family	Jim Powell	20 episodes
2012–2013	Vegas	Vincent Savino	21 episodes
2014–2015	American Horror Story: Freak Show	Dell Toledo	9 episodes
2014	Sons of Anarchy	Milo	2 episodes
2015–2017	Gotham	Captain Nathaniel Barnes	27 episodes
2015	Axe Cop		Voice, episode: "Heads Will Roll"
2016	The Simpsons	Boston Americans Quarterback	Voice, episode: "The Town"
2018–2019	DuckTales	Zeus	Voice, 3 episodes
2020	Deathstroke: Knights & Dragons	Slade Wilson/Deathstroke	Voice, main role
2021	Coyote	Ben Clemens	6 episodes
2022–2023	Winning Time: The Rise of the Lakers Dynasty	Red Auerbach	10 episodes
2023	Accused	Scott Harmon	Episode: "Scott's Story"
2024	Hotel Cocaine	Agent Zulio	8 episodes
2024	Accused	Justin Ward	Episode: "Justin's Story"
2025	BMF	DEA Agent Taylor	Episode: "Dreams Deferred"
2026	Life, Larry and the Pursuit of Unhappiness	Sergeant	Episode: "Livingston"

=== Video games ===
Year	Title	Role	Notes
2005	Fantastic Four	Ben Grimm / The Thing	Voice and likeness
2007	The Shield	Vic Mackey	Voice and likeness

=== Theater ===
Year	Title	Role	Venue	Notes
1997	Defending the Caveman	–	Booth Theatre, New York	One-man show Replacement

== Awards and nominations ==
Year	Association	Category	Nominated work	Result
2002	Primetime Emmy Awards	Outstanding Lead Actor in a Drama Series	The Shield	Won
2002	Television Critics Association Awards	Individual Achievement in Drama	The Shield	Won
2003	Golden Globe Awards	Best Actor – Television Series Drama	The Shield	Won
2003	Primetime Emmy Awards	Outstanding Lead Actor in a Drama Series	The Shield	Nominated
2003	Satellite Awards	Best Actor – Television Series Drama	The Shield	Nominated
2003	Screen Actors Guild Awards	Outstanding Performance by a Male Actor in a Drama Series	The Shield	Nominated
2004	Golden Globe Awards	Best Actor – Television Series Drama	The Shield	Nominated
2004	Satellite Awards	Best Actor – Television Series Drama	The Shield	Won
2005	Golden Globe Awards	Best Actor – Television Series Drama	The Shield	Nominated
2006	MTV Movie Awards	Best On-Screen Team (shared with Jessica Alba, Ioan Gruffudd and Chris Evans)	Fantastic Four	Nominated
