= Ranan Lurie =

American cartoonist (1932–2022)

- רענן לוריא
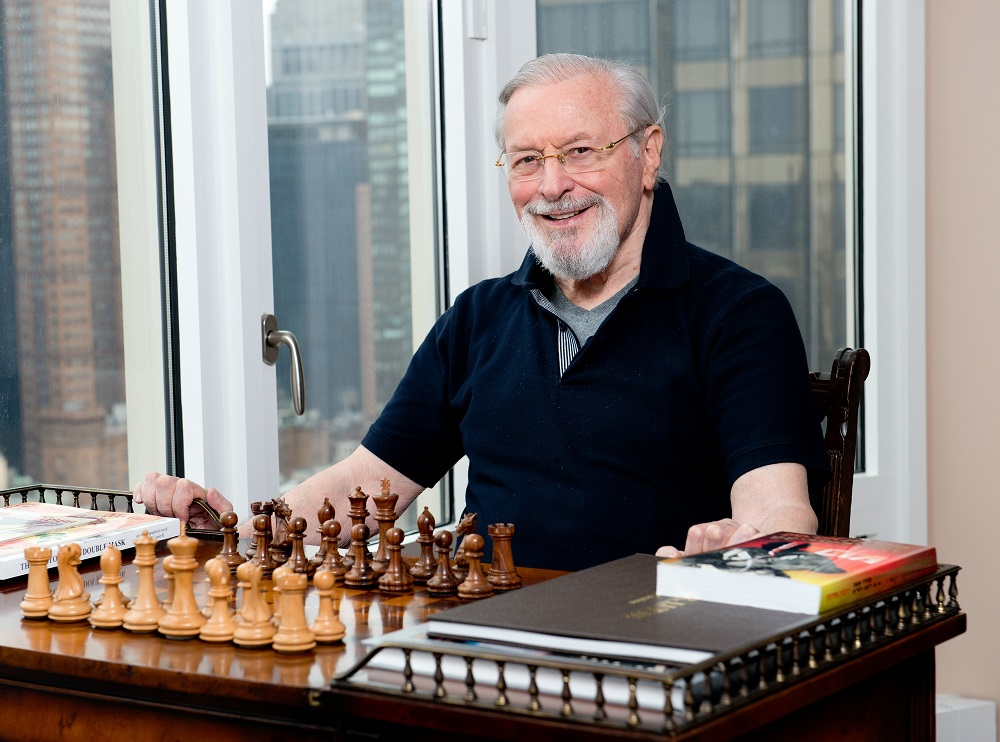
- Lurie in 2013
- Born: Ranan Raymond Lurie; May 26, 1932; Port Said, Egypt
- Died: June 8, 2022 (aged 90); Las Vegas, Nevada, U.S.
- Education: Herzliya Hebrew Gymnasium
- Occupations: Cartoonist, journalist
- Children: Rod Lurie

Ranan R. Lurie (Hebrew: רענן לוריא; May 26, 1932 – June 8, 2022) was an Israeli-American political cartoonist and journalist, a senior associate at the CSIS (Center for Strategic and International Studies) since 1990, a member of the United Nations Correspondents Association, and founder and Editor-in-Chief of Cartoonews, a current events educational magazine.

== Biography ==
Ranan Lurie was born on May 26, 1932, the son of Shoshana (Shmuelewitz) and Joseph Lurie, who had traveled from Tel Aviv to Port Said, Egypt, at the invitation of Joseph's father (Rabbi Isaiah Lurie) to give birth to their first child at his home. (This event gave him an advantage when he met with President Sadat (1977 and 1979) as well as with President Mubarak (1984 and 1997) for interviews and portrait-sittings). Two weeks after his birth Ranan and his parents returned to Tel Aviv. His father was sixth-generation Jerusalem-born and his mother seventh-generation.

Ranan Lurie's father was born in 1906, in the new neighborhood of "Yemin Moshe". The grandfather Isaiah, petrified by the thought that he would be recruited into the Turkish army during the First World War, utilized his French citizenship and fled to Egypt where he became the president of the Ashkenazi Jewish community.

Lurie was a member of the Israeli underground armed organization (Irgun) and was wounded in a battle against the British. He later served in the IDF reserves as a Major and company commander.

In July 1954, when Israel and Egypt were still in an official stage of war, Lurie visited the flagship of an Egyptian navy flotilla anchoring in Venice, pretending to be an Australian journalist, he interviewed the frigate's high ranking enemy officers and took photographs of their newly installed Soviet Radar. Lurie described this as an infiltration and won an Israeli journalistic award "For Unprecedented bravery".

About a week before the Six-Day War began, Lurie had his fine-art exhibit in Montreal. He was recruited in the midst of his show to his reserve duty as a Senior Company Commander, a Major in the Fifth Brigade (Giv'aty) that was commanded by Colonel Ze'ev Shaham. Lurie's first mission was to protect Israel's "bottleneck" (the narrowest stretch of land between the sea and Jordanian Tulkarm) his original unit swelled to five hundred warriors (which now included tanks, anti-tank guns mounted on jeeps, a battery of Howitzer guns, a reserve company of Technion students as well as a company of army engineers.) After 36 hours of suffering heavy shelling he switched his force to attack-mode and conquered Tulkarm from the North. Then he received a direct order from General Uzi Narkiss, commander of The Central Command "To storm as far as possible in the direction of Nablus with the intent of reaching the Ramin Junction within ninety minutes - and make a bold sweep that will hopefully expose the Egyptian/Iraqi commandos that were trying to introduce toxic gas to the front lines." In this mission, Lurie confronted the Egyptian commandos and the Arab Legion. He and his now tiny force pin-pointed the placing of the gas-equipped Egyptian commandos, and after eliminating them through fierce face-to-face battle, discovered the dreading skull & bones gas symbols on the cans available already for action. His escapades then were reported by the international media and lectured at West Point.

== Career ==
Lurie was the political cartoonist for Yediot Aharonot of Israel (1957–1967) after which he was invited to become a political cartoonist and cover artist for LIFE magazine (1968–1972).

In 1964, the Prime Minister Levi Eshkol unveiled Lurie's one-man show of oil portraits at the "Sokolov House" in Tel Aviv, in the presence of Joseph Zaritsky, Reuven Rubin and Meiron Sima. On May 23, 1967, the President of Israel, Zalman Shazar, unveiled Lurie's one-man show of oil portraits at "Expo 67" in Montreal, Canada.

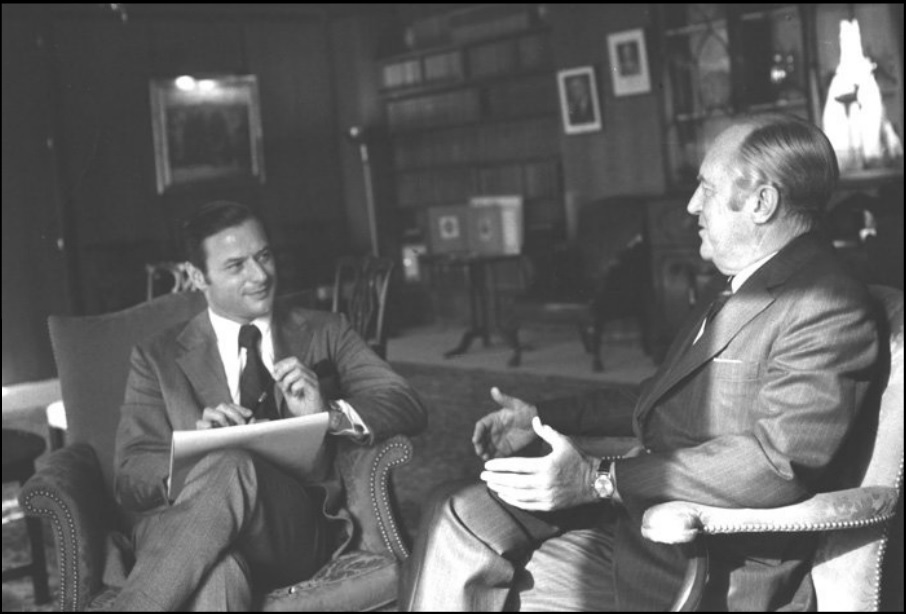
Ranan Lurie and Secretary of State, William P. Rogers

After LIFE magazine folded in late December 1972, he was invited to publish his cartoons in Newsweek. A short time after, he was offered a full page in Newsweek International (1973–1977), and later served as the Senior Analyst and political cartoonist for The U.S. News & World Report in Washington, D.C. (1984–1986). Later, he had his own full page in Time International (1994–1997). Subsequently, he had a full page in Foreign Affairs magazine (2000–2004). He was the in-house political cartoonist for The London Times, Die Welt (Germany), Asahi Shimbun (Japan) and started the first political cartoon for the Neue Zürcher Zeitung (Switzerland), which is one of the oldest newspapers in print. According to the Center for Professional Journalism Studies, over the years, he was syndicated globally to more than 1,100 publications with a daily readership of 300 million. His works were handled by the New York Times Syndicate, King Features Syndicate and Universal Press Syndicate. In 1985 Lurie started his own "Cartoonews International Syndicate."

He is probably the only artist who has been invited simultaneously by both the Democratic Party and the Republican Party to hold a one-man show at the U.S. Senate (October 23, 1973). Senator Abraham Ribicoff unveiled Lurie's exhibition on behalf of the Democratic Party, followed by Senator Lowell Weicker, who unveiled it on behalf of the Republican Party. Vice President Gerald Ford presided over the event. The exhibit took place at the Senate Caucus Room on Capitol Hill "In Honor of Ranan Lurie" and it was sponsored by the New York Times publishing house.

Lurie interviewed, painted, and drew more than 250 world leaders. His drawings often include a small trademark smiling sun, sometimes drawn on the subject's necktie or other articles of clothing.

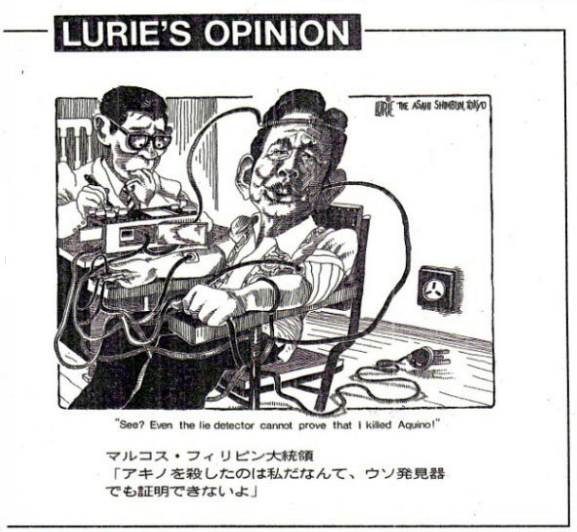
The cartoon of Marcos by Ranan Lurie, as published in Asahi Shimbun

== Uniting Painting ==
He created his "Uniting Painting", the "Fine Art with a Mission", a contemporary art project that originated from the United Nations General Assembly Building in New York on October 24, 2005 (United Nations Day). It was the largest contemporary painting ever exhibited at the headquarters of the United Nations, measuring 75 feet (23 m) wide and 600 feet (180 m) long. The painting was so large that part of it was also exhibited on nearby Roosevelt Island for four years. Custom-painted extensions of the art were installed by the government of the Republic of Korea on the border between South Korea and North Korea (2006). Another "Uniting Painting" installation now orbits (on a satellite) earth, and simultaneously another three sections were brought by Sherpas to the summit of Mount Everest (April 19, 2011).

== Post-1984 career ==
Lurie became a naturalized citizen of the United States in 1974. Senator Lowell Weicker delivered to him personally his American passport.

In 1984, he created Japan's national cartoon symbol, sponsored by Japan's Prime Minister Yasuhiro Nakasone and the Asahi Shimbun daily.

In 1985, he created Taiwan's national cartoon symbol, sponsored by Taiwan's Government.

In 1985, he also started his year-long daily animated news cartoon on PBS' network (the MacNeil Lehrer Newshour).

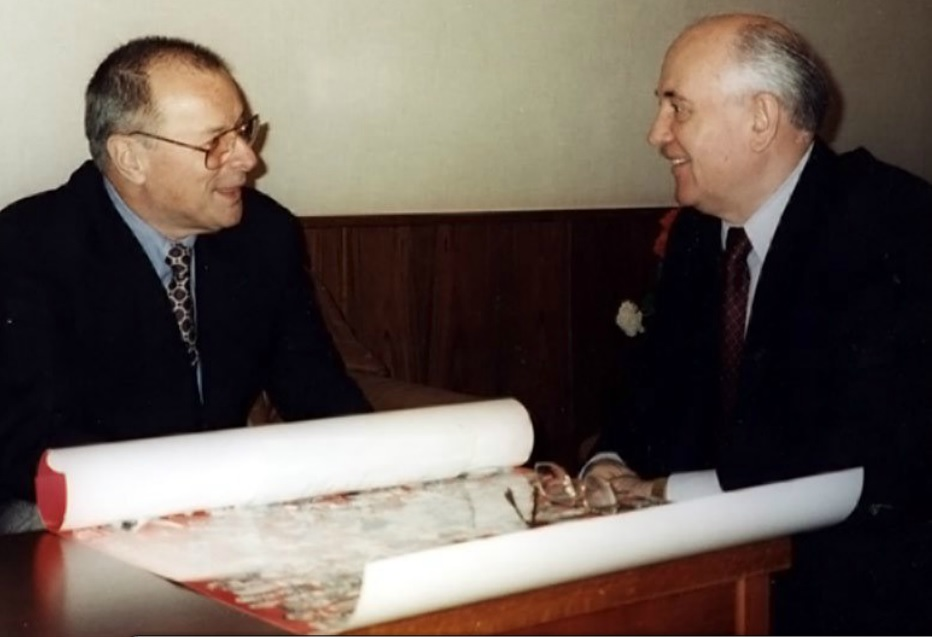
Ranan Lurie and Mikhail Gorbachev

In 1993, John Brewer, the president of The New York Times Syndicate set the framework for publishing a joint column by Mikhail Gorbachev, former president of the USSR, and Ranan Lurie. In the column, Gorbachev wrote his opinion about world politics (issues like the Persian Gulf War and future of Communism) and Lurie added a caricature giving a different opinion, Lurie's counterpoint. The joint column was published for some years in more than 100 newspapers worldwide, including The New York Times.

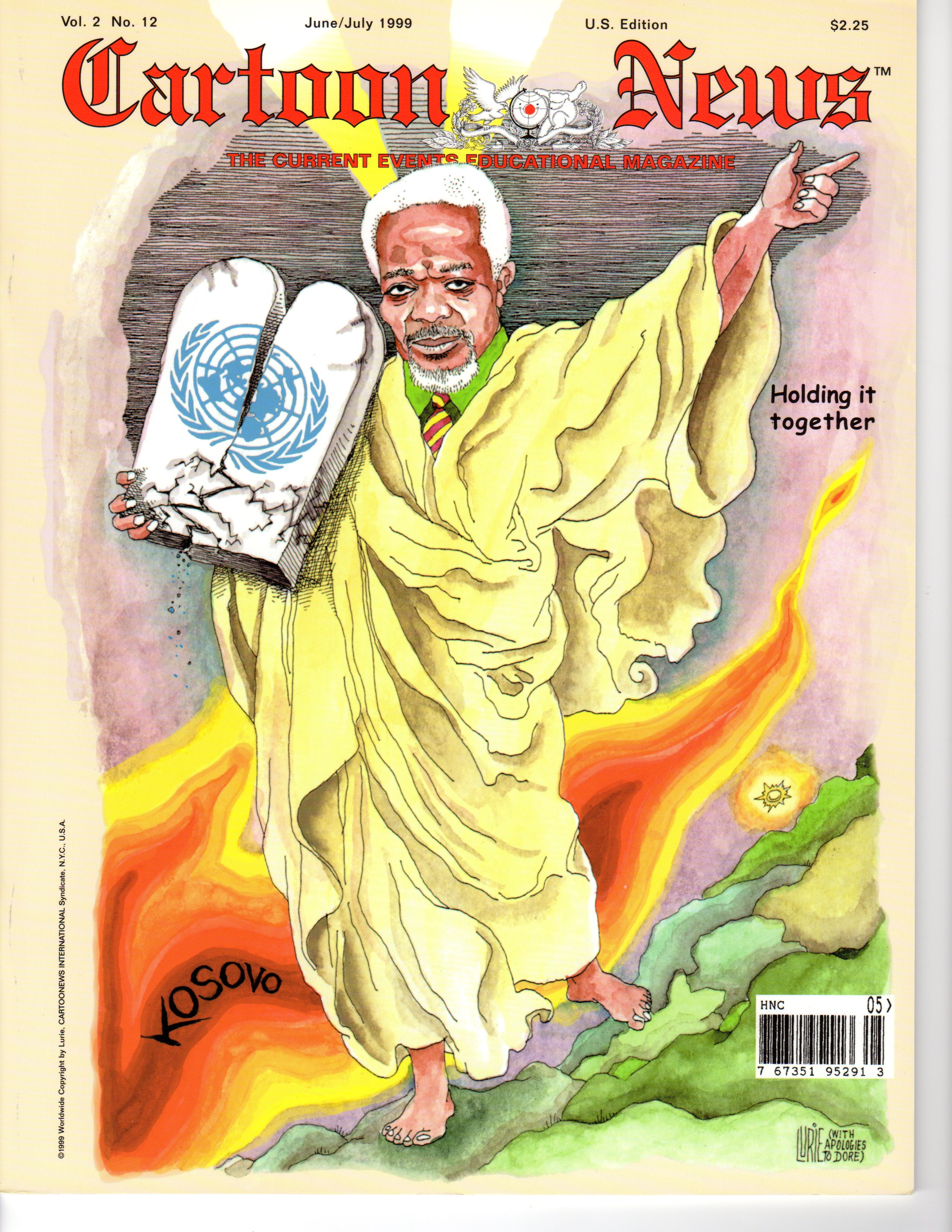
Secretary-General of the United Nations, Kofi Annan, by Ranan Lurie, on the front page of "Cartoon News"

At the beginning of 1996 Lurie created "Cartoon News", an educational magazine that taught current events by introducing mainly political cartoons supported by very short texts. Lurie, the editor in chief had about 60 cartoonists from all over the world working for it. The readership reached 600,000 within a short time.

About a year later, at the recommendation of the American Ambassador to Egypt, Ned Walker, President Hosni Mubarak together with the publishers of "Al-Ahram" offered Lurie to publish his cartoons in "Al-Ahram" and print an Egyptian version of his "Cartoon News" in Arabic.

Lurie was a member of Mensa.

The United Nations/Ranan Lurie Political Cartoon Awards were created by former Secretary General Kofi Annan in 2000 and continued by Secretary General Ban Ki-moon. The award recognizes cartoons that "enhance, explain and help direct the spirit and principles of the U.N." The three first awards are worth a total of $18,000 and are distributed along with ten recognition plaques signed by the Secretary-General and Ranan Lurie.

On May 28, 1997, a plaza in Seoul, South Korea was named after Ranan Lurie, who has also received the "golden key to the city". Lurie was nominated by the Republic of Cyprus for the 2002 Nobel Peace Prize, signed on March 14, 2002, by Glafcos Clerides, the President of the Republic.

== Family ==
He is the father of Rod Lurie, a West Point graduate who is a film director and screenwriter. His son Barak Lurie is a Stanford graduate and the Managing Partner of Lurie & Seltzer, a law firm headquartered in Los Angeles, also known for his radio show, "Lurie's Law"; His daughter Dr. Daphne Lurie is a Williams alumnus and the Directing Psychologist at the San Diego Scripps Research Institute. Danielle Lurie is a Stanford graduate and a movie director in New York.

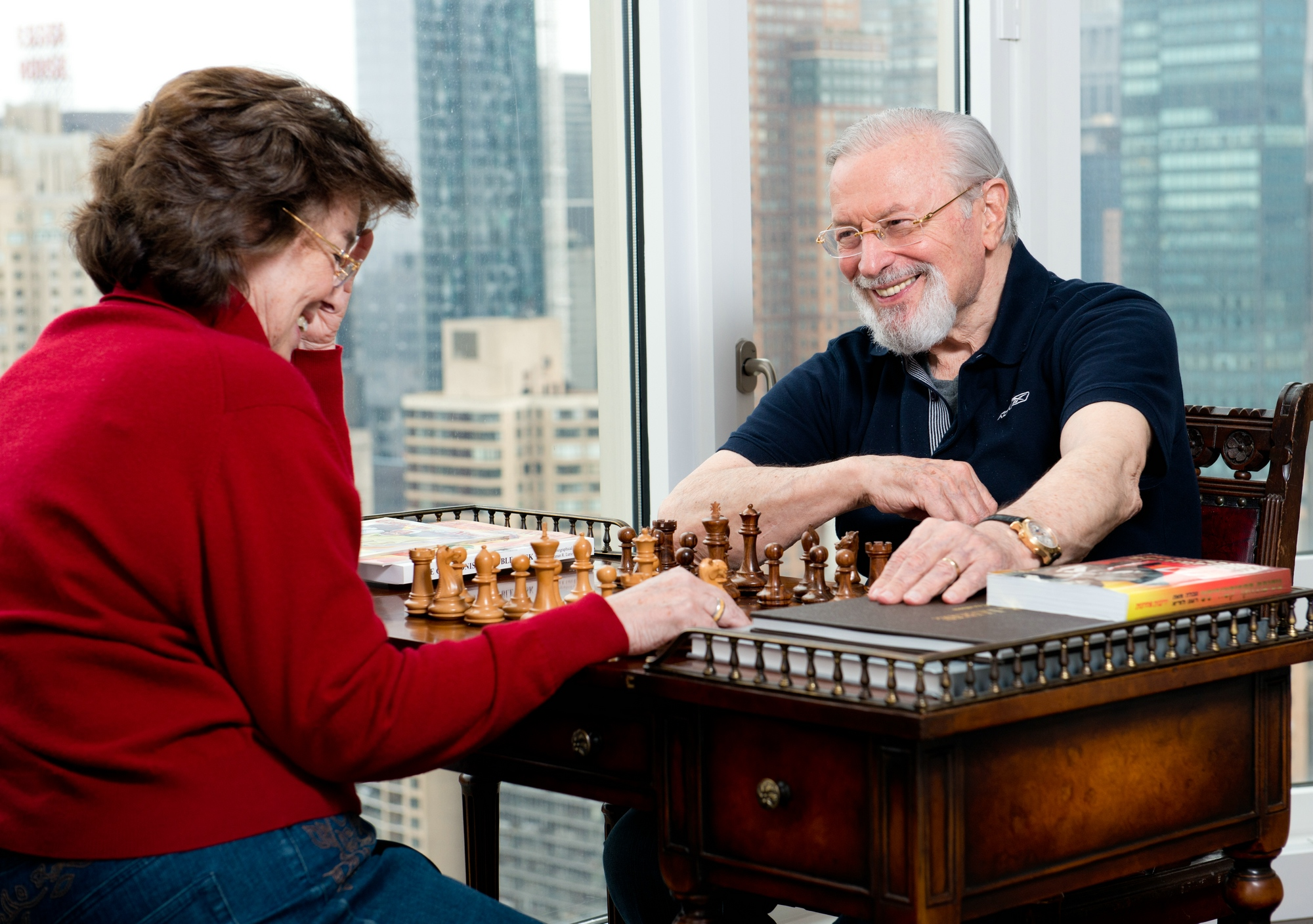
Ranan and Tamar Lurie, 2013

Lurie lived in Greenwich, Connecticut with his wife, Tamar (Fletcher) Lurie, a real estate executive at Coldwell Banker, and on Central Park West in New York City. He worked from his studios on the Time Warner Building.

== Books ==
He published ten political cartoon books and one novel in five languages:

- AMONG THE SUNS—published by Israel's Air Force (Hebrew; introduction: Ephraim Kishon).
- LURIE'S BEST CARTOONS FROM ISRAEL—printed by the N. Tversky Publishing House of Tel Aviv, Ltd., Israel (First Edition in Hebrew, Second Edition in English; introduction by Foreign Minister Aba Eban).
- NIXON RATED CARTOONS—printed by the New York Times publishing house (English; USA; foreword by Thomas Griffith, Editor of LIFE).
- PARDON ME MR. PRESIDENT—printed by the New York Times publishing house (English; USA; foreword by commentator Harry Reasoner and special comment by Vice President Gerald Ford).
- LURIE'S WORLDS—printed by the University Press of Hawaii (English; USA; foreword by Clare Boothe Luce).
- SO SIEHT ES LURIE (1980) -- printed by Welt Buch publishing house of Berlin (German; introduction by Ephraim Kishon).
- LURIE'S OPINION—printed by Zmorah Bitan publishing house of Tel Aviv (Hebrew; introduction by Shalom Rosenfeld, editor, Ma'ariv).
- LURIE'S ALMANACK—printed by Secker & Warburg, London (English; U.K.; introduction by Charles Douglas Home, editor, The Times).
- LURIE'S ALMANAC—printed by Andrews and McMeel publishing house of Kansas City-New York (English; USA; foreword by Charles Douglas-Home).
- MR. TARO SAN'S POLITICS—printed by Shinchosha Co. (Japanese; Tokyo).

In 1985, Lurie created an electronic cartoon animation technique that brought his cartoons to PBS stations and ABC network.

In 1995, Lurie co-invented an automobile braking system that has a variable light and sound warning, registered as American Patent 5481243.

Gallery of Ranan Lurie cartoons

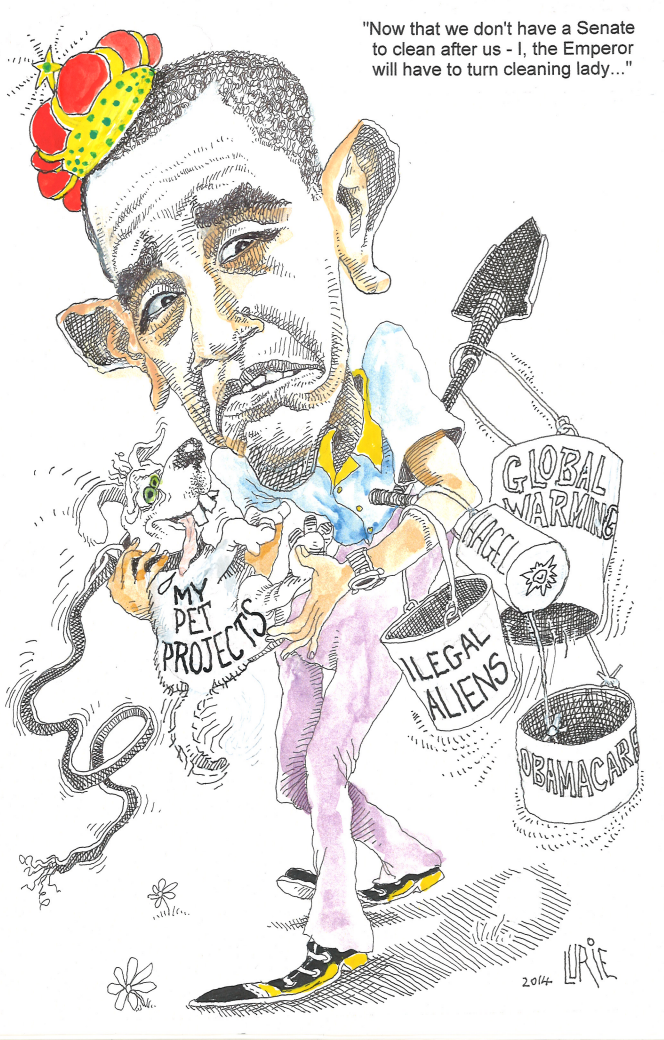
Current news cartoon: Barack Obama President of the United States, November 2014

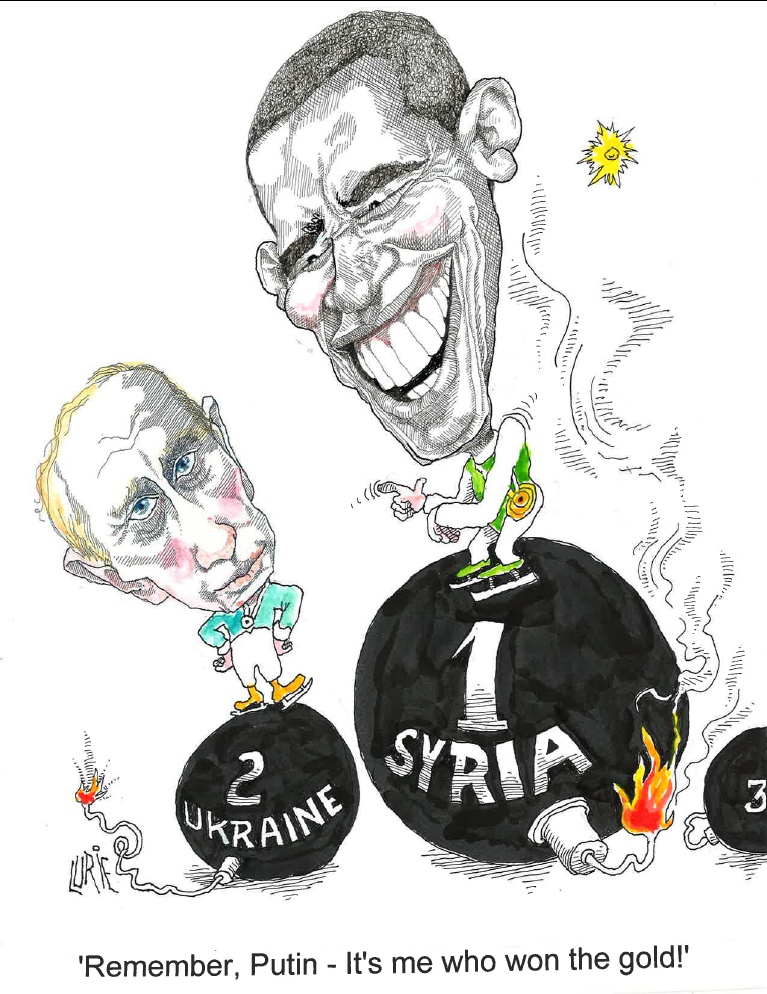
Barack Obama, President of the United States and Vladimir Putin, President of Russia

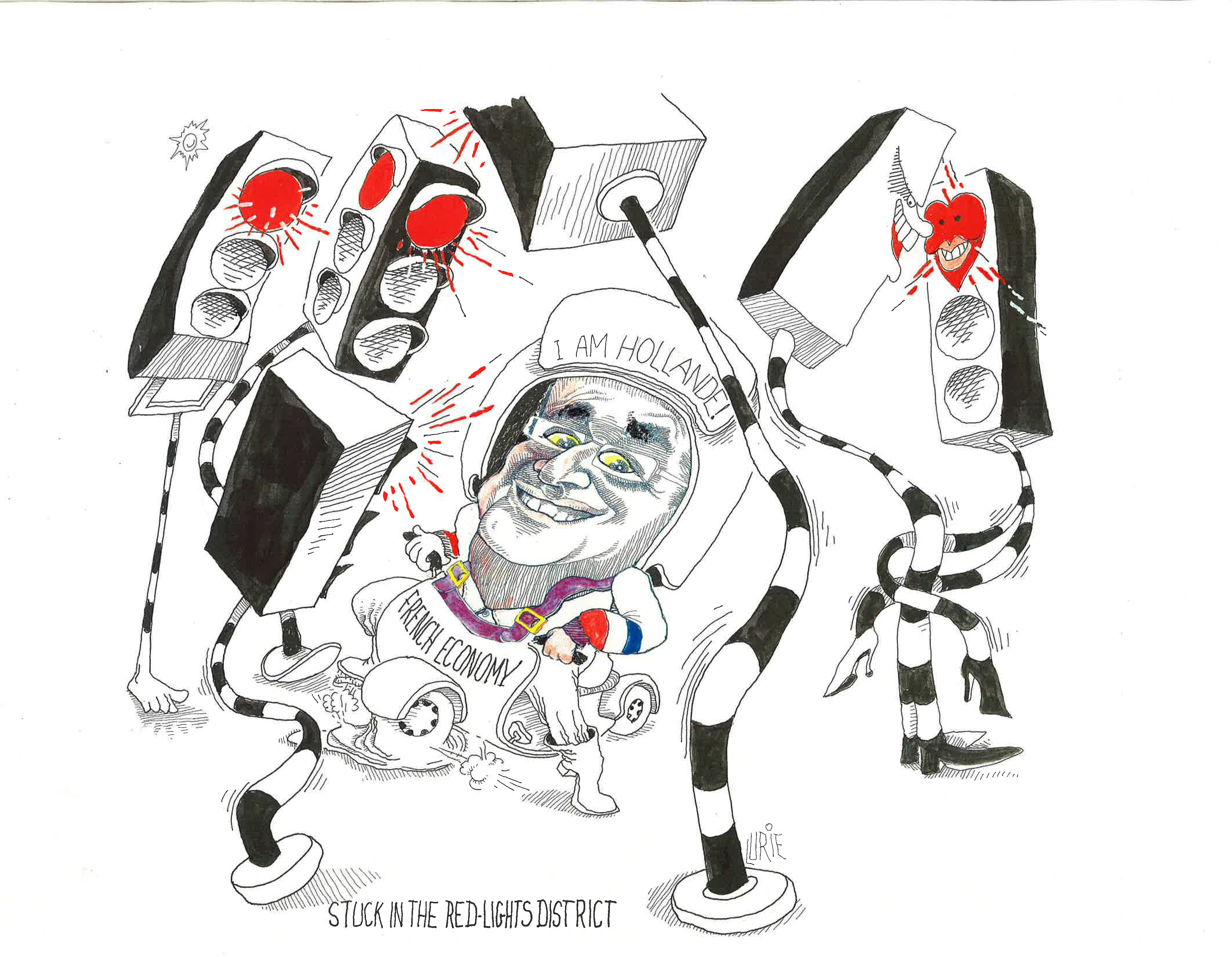
François Hollande, President of France

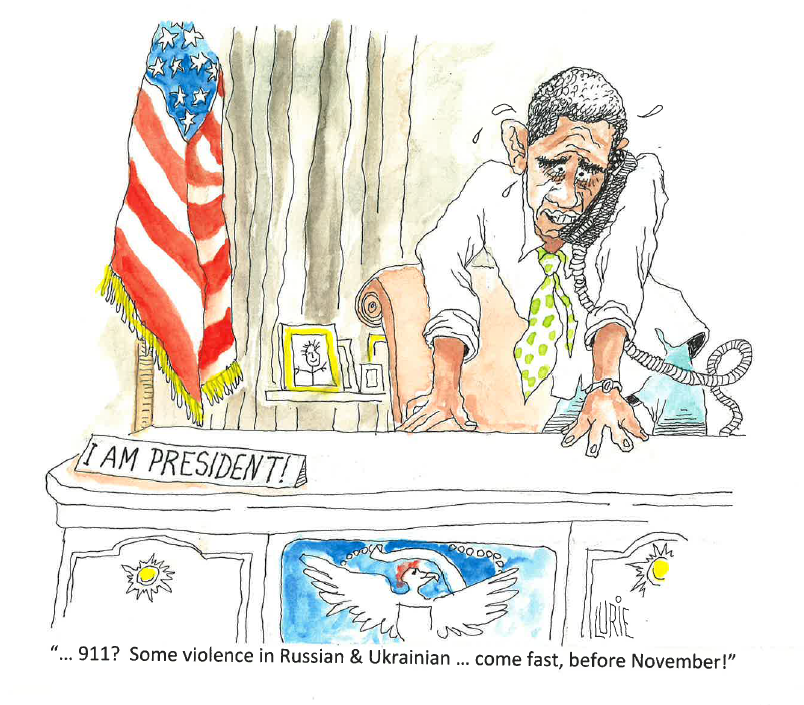
Barack Obama, President of the United States and the annexation of Crimea by the Russian Federation.

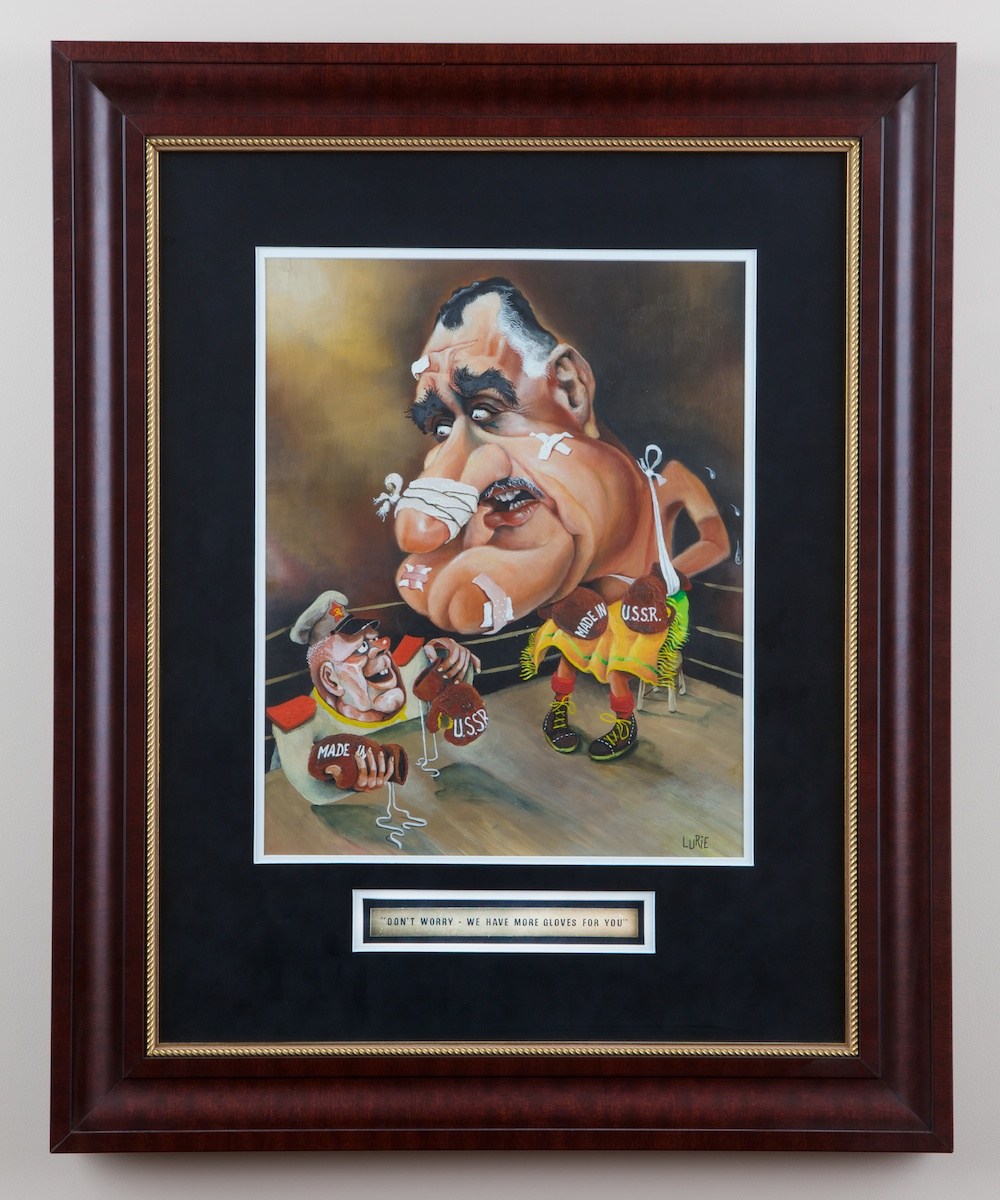
"Don't worry - we have more gloves for you".
First published in LIFE magazine, 1968, showing President of Egypt, Gamal Abdel Nasser, recovering from Six-Day War results.

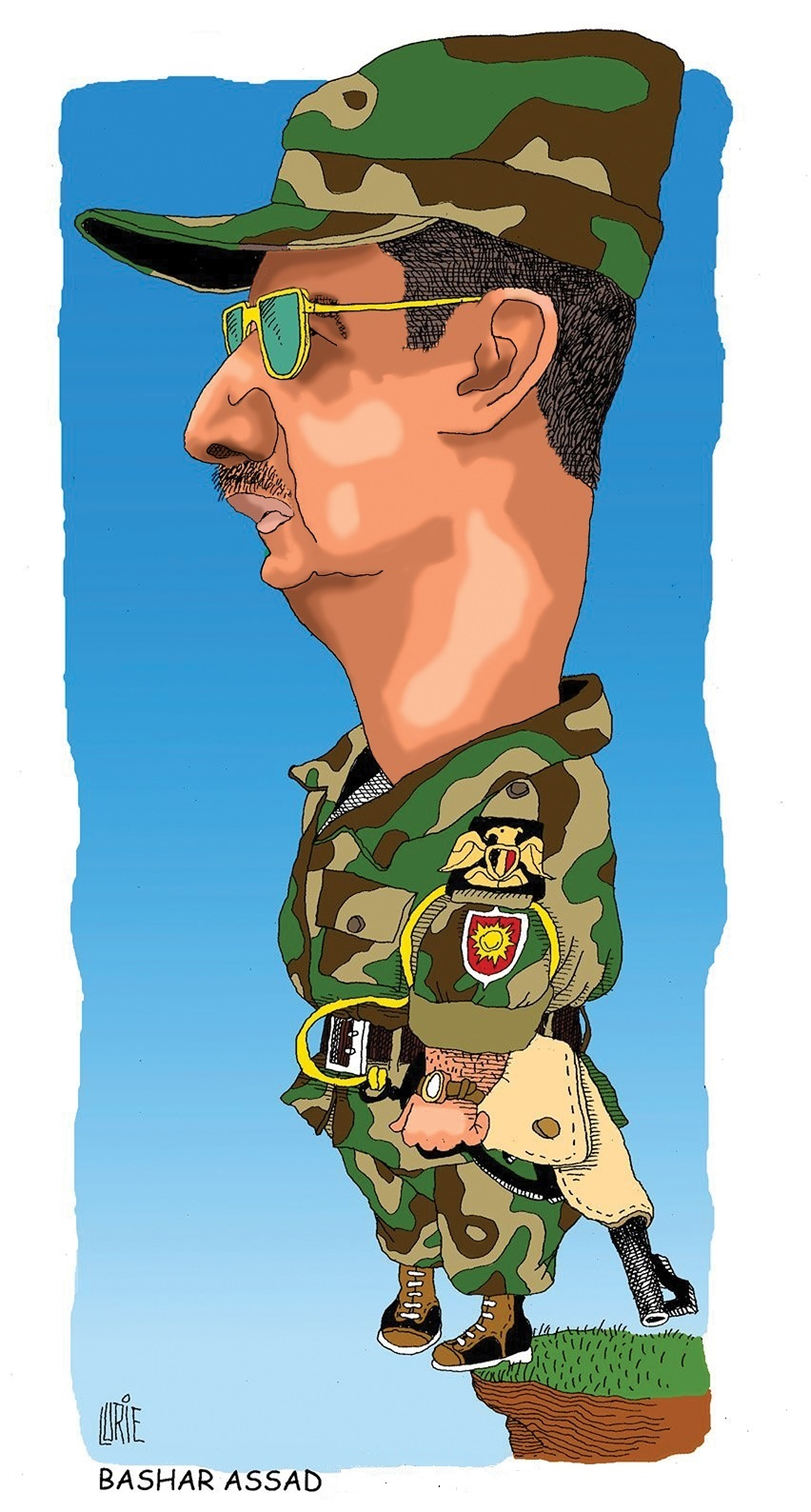
Bashar al-Assad, becoming Syria's president, 2000.

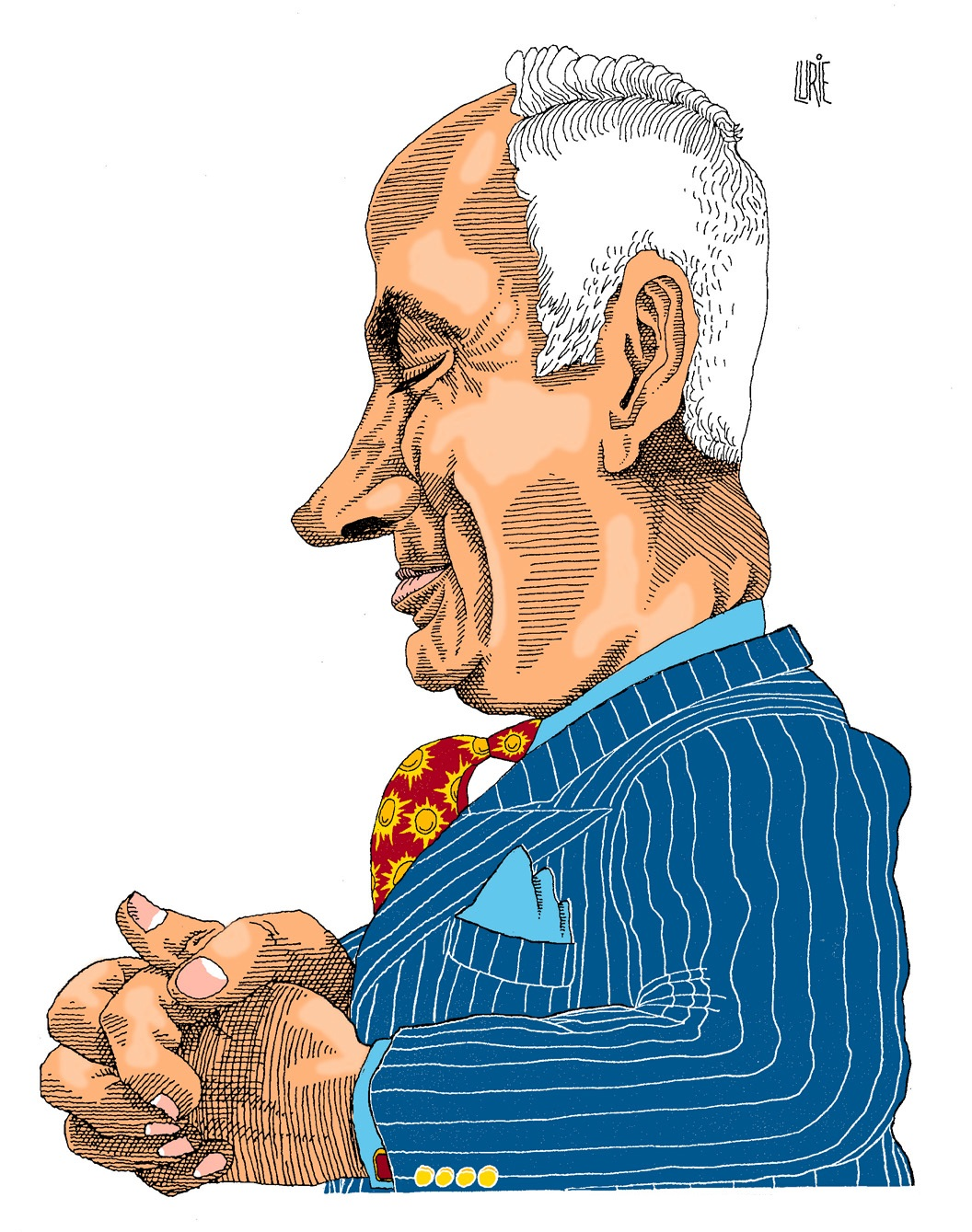
Benjamin Netanyahu, Prime Minister of Israel
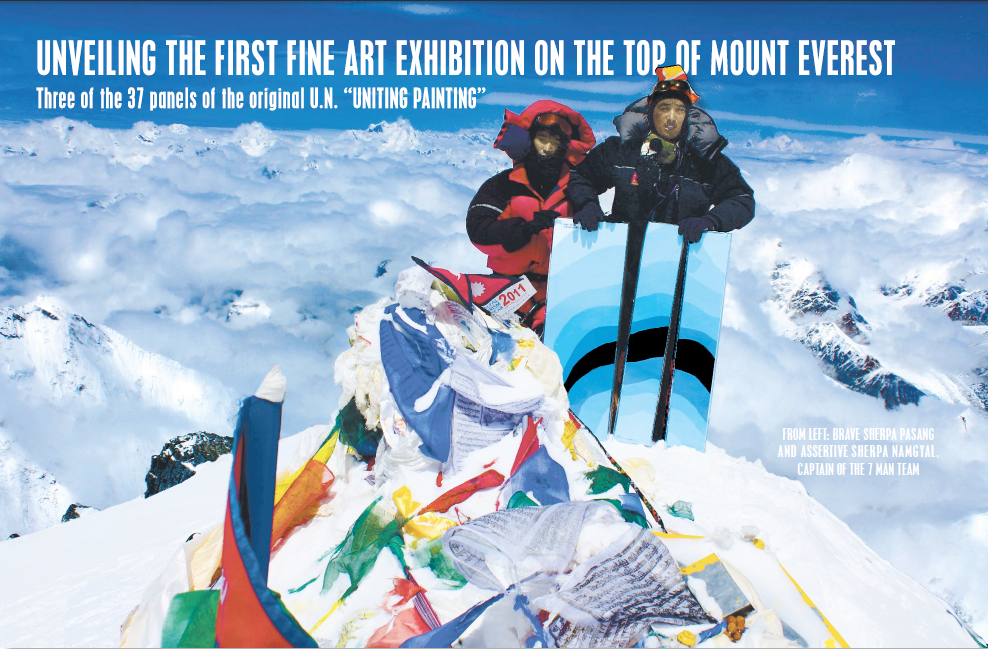
The Uniting Painting on Everest

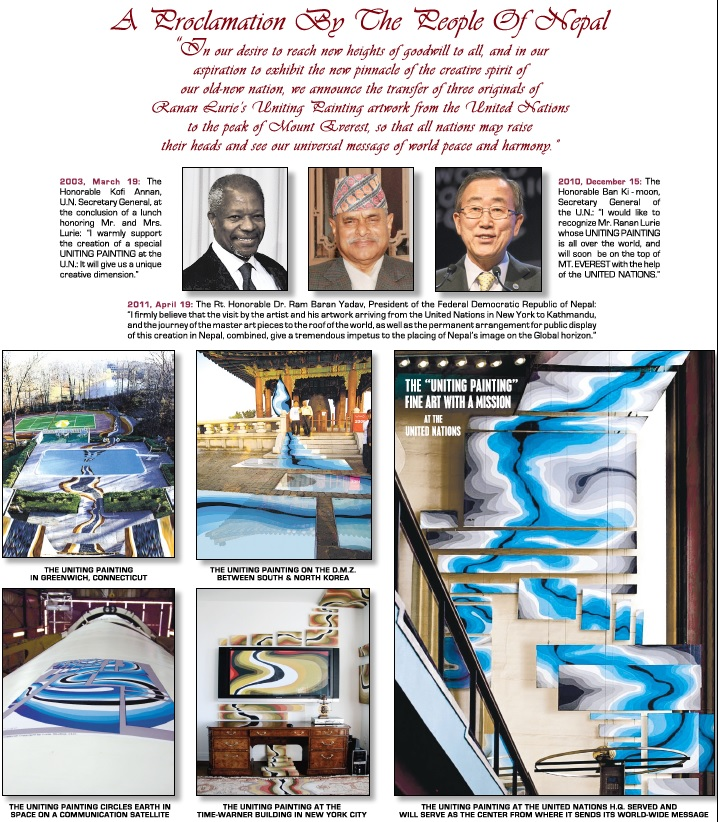
The Uniting Painting
