= Autumn Chiklis =

Canadian-American actress (born 1993)

- Born: October 9, 1993 (age 32)
- Occupation: Actress
- Years active: 2002–present
- Spouse: Dor Gvirtsman
- Children: 1
- Father: Michael Chiklis

Autumn Isabella Chiklis (born October 9, 1993) is a Canadian-American actress. She is best known for her role as Cassidy Mackey on The Shield (2002–2008).

== Life and career ==
Chiklis is the daughter of actors Michael Chiklis and Michelle Moran, and she has a younger sister Odessa, born in 1999. She was born on October 9, 1993, while her father was shooting the television series The Commish. According to him, she was named Autumn "because she was born on such a beautiful autumn day." She was very close to her father growing up, calling him her best friend. Chiklis described herself as bookish and quiet, contrasting with her fun, partying mother. Between 2002 and 2008, she portrayed Cassidy Mackey on the TV show The Shield, the daughter of her real-life father, who played corrupt police officer Vic Mackey. Chiklis was not allowed to watch the entire show due to the mature subject matter.

She attended Harvard-Westlake School in Los Angeles, graduating in 2012. Chiklis then attended the University of Southern California and joined a sorority. She graduated in 2016 with a degree in theater and screenwriting. In August 2018, her first book, Smothered was published and became an LA Times Bestseller. Detailing the adventures of Elouise Hansen and her mother Shelly, the book is a fictionalized take on Chiklis's own upbringing. Town & Country called the book "a humorous tale of the struggles that come after graduating summa cum laude."

In addition to acting and writing, Chiklis has also done stand-up comedy.

== Filmography ==
Year	Title	Role	Notes
2002–2008	The Shield	Cassidy Mackey	TV series, 35 episodes
2018	Brosa Nostra	Alyssa Becker	TV short

== Bibliography ==
- Chiklis, Autumn (2018). Smothered: A Novel. Wednesday Books. ISBN 978-1250306784.
