= The Senior (film) =

2023 film by Rod Lurie

- Theatrical release poster
- Directed by: Rod Lurie
- Written by: Robert Eisele
- Produced by: Mark Ciardi; Campbell McInnes; Justin Baldoni; Andrew Calof; Manu Gargi
- Starring: Michael Chiklis; Mary Stuart Masterson; Brandon Flynn; James Badge Dale; Rob Corddry
- Cinematography: Tucker Korte
- Edited by: Abbi Jutkowitz; Sean Albertson
- Music by: Larry Groupé
- Production company: Wayfarer Studios
- Distributed by: Angel
- Release dates: November 9, 2023 (Fort Lauderdale); September 19, 2025 (United States)
- Running time: 99 minutes
- Country: United States
- Language: English
- Box office: $5.3 million

The Senior is a 2023 American sports drama film directed by Rod Lurie, written by Robert Eisele, and starring Michael Chiklis, Mary Stuart Masterson, Brandon Flynn, James Badge Dale, and Rob Corddry. It is based on the true story of Mike Flynt who, at age 59, became a college football linebacker.

== Plot ==
59-year-old Mike Flynt gets a second chance to play college football, where he becomes a linebacker.

== Cast ==
- Michael Chiklis as Mike Flynt
- Mary Stuart Masterson as Eileen Flynt
- Brandon Flynn as Micah Flynt
- Rob Corddry as Sam Weston
- James Badge Dale
- Terayle Hill as Jamal Johnson
- Corey Knight as Jeremy Cartwright

== Production ==
The film was shot at Scarborough-Handley Field stadium in the Historic Handley neighborhood in Fort Worth, Texas. In March 2022, it was announced that filming wrapped.

== Release ==
The film premiered at the Fort Lauderdale International Film Festival on November 9, 2023. The film was originally scheduled for a theatrical release in the United States on March 7, 2025 by Freestyle Releasing but was later removed from the calendar.

In July 2025, it was announced that Angel released the film in theaters on September 19, 2025.

== Reception ==
On the review aggregator website Rotten Tomatoes, 79% of 29 critics' reviews are positive, with an average rating of 6.7/10. Metacritic, which uses a weighted average, assigned the film a score of 59 out of 100, based on 5 critics, indicating "mixed or average" reviews. Audiences polled by CinemaScore gave the film an average grade of "A" on an A+ to F scale.

Nell Minow of RogerEbert.com awarded the film three stars out of four. Alan Ng of Film Threat rated the film a 7.5 out of 10. Julian Roman of MovieWeb awarded the film three stars out of five.

Frank Scheck of The Hollywood Reporter gave the film a positive review and wrote, "… the familiar beats are hammered so skillfully you don’t mind the manipulation. And although you may be shocked, shocked, to learn that the film takes some liberties with the truth, they’re not so egregious as to diminish its overall impact."

Owen Gleiberman of Variety also gave the film a positive review and wrote, “It’s basically a soft-hearted paint-by-numbers TV-movie, stocked with homilies about the game of football vs. the game of life. Yet it’s an effective soft-hearted paint-by-numbers TV-movie.”
