= Rod Lurie =

American film director (born 1962)

- רוד לוריא
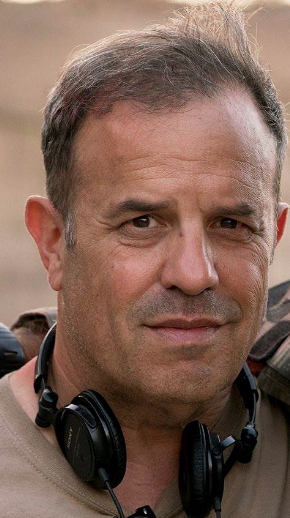
- Lurie on the set of The Outpost, c. 2018.
- Born: May 15, 1962 (age 64); Israel
- Education: United States Military Academy
- Occupations: Film director, screenwriter, film producer
- Years active: 1990–present
- Spouse: Kyra Davis
- Children: 3
- Father: Ranan Lurie

Rod Lurie (Hebrew: רוד לוריא; born May 15, 1962) is an Israeli-born American filmmaker, journalist and former film critic.

== Early life ==
Lurie was born in Israel, the son of cartoonist Ranan Lurie. He moved to the United States at a young age, growing up in Greenwich, Connecticut, and Honolulu, Hawaii. Graduating from the United States Military Academy at West Point in 1984, he served in the U.S. Army as an air defense artillery officer.

Lurie places tributes to his alma mater in his films such as Deterrence where an aide-de-camp to the President admits he had to settle for the United States Air Force Academy because he couldn't get into West Point. Also, in The Contender, Jeff Bridges' president Evans can be seen wearing a West Point sweatshirt during the film.

The characters of President Jackson Evans (The Contender), prison inmate Lt. Gen. Eugene Irwin (The Last Castle), FBI agent Paige Van Doren (Line of Fire), and vice presidential nominee Gen. (ret.) Warren Keaton (Commander in Chief) are all fictional graduates of the "Long Gray Line".

== Journalism career ==
Lurie became an entertainment reporter and film critic, including stints at News12 in Norwalk, Connecticut, the New York Daily News, Premiere, Movieline, Entertainment Weekly, Los Angeles, and talk radio shows at KMPC and KABC, where his tactical on-air bets with Martin Landau, Mel Gibson and James Cameron that they would win the Oscar resulted in them having to pay up at the Academy Awards ceremony by publicly thanking him in their acceptance speeches.

As an investigative reporter in the entertainment industry, Lurie's discovery of unethical and illegal practices at tabloid newspapers gained him national exposure on programs such as 60 Minutes, Entertainment Tonight, Larry King Live, Nightline, and Geraldo. His irreverent style, however (he once described Danny DeVito as a "testicle with arms"), often raised controversy and got him banned from screenings.

In 1995, Lurie's book Once Upon a Time in Hollywood: Moviemaking, Con Games, and Murder in Glitter City, was published by Pantheon Books.

== Directing career ==
Lurie's first foray into filmmaking, as writer and director, was the low-budget political thriller Deterrence (1999), with Kevin Pollak as the first Jewish President of the United States.

His second was The Contender (2000), starring Gary Oldman. It was written for Joan Allen and co-stars Jeff Bridges and Christian Slater. It was a critical success (76 percent positive on Rotten Tomatoes) and garnered Academy Award nominations for both Allen and Bridges.

His next directing effort, The Last Castle (2001) with Robert Redford and James Gandolfini, was a commercial failure; as was Line of Fire, his 2003–04 TV series about the FBI's office in Richmond, Virginia, which starred David Paymer as a mob boss.

Lurie then wrote and directed Nothing But the Truth, which is based on the stories of Valerie Plame and Judith Miller, which stars Kate Beckinsale, Matt Dillon, Angela Bassett, Alan Alda and David Schwimmer. Lurie insisted his film is not intended to be an accurate depiction of the Plame Affair, but merely a vehicle to explore a similar situation, which he then takes several steps further. "You look at the story that happened in reality, and Judy Miller gets some sort of permission to speak and then speaks. So what? Nothing really big came of the whole thing," explained Lurie in an interview published prior to the film's release. "I tried to make a movie that's a commercial thriller as well as being something that's topical."

Lurie worked on Resurrecting the Champ, a boxing drama, and served as creator and executive producer of the short-lived television series Commander in Chief, which starred Geena Davis as the United States' first female President, Mackenzie Allen. The show's high ratings plummeted after Lurie's departure from the show and its cancellation followed.

Lurie worked for ABC, but his contract, which was terminated during the 2007–08 Writers Guild of America strike, was not renewed when it ended.

Lurie also directed the remake of the home invasion thriller Straw Dogs. It received negative reviews from both audience viewers and critics, and did very poorly at the box office.

Lurie directed the 2020 war film The Outpost, based on the true story of the Battle of Kamdesh during the War in Afghanistan. The film received highly positive reviews, with significant praise for the battle sequences and depictions of the soldiers.

In September 2021, Lurie said he was working on a boxing epic set at West Point.

Lurie's film The Senior was released in 2023.

In 2024, it was announced that Scott Eastwood and Colin Hanks will star in Lurie's war film Lucky Strike.

== Personal life ==
Lurie lives in Los Angeles with his wife, author Kyra Davis. He has three children, Hunter, Paige, and Isaac. Hunter Lurie died on July 2, 2018, aged 27 from a cardiac arrest. Lurie adopted his stepson Isaac in 2023.

== Filmography ==
=== Feature films ===
- Deterrence (1999) – director, writer, actor
- The Contender (2000) – director, writer
- The Last Castle (2001) – director
- Resurrecting the Champ (2007) – director, producer, actor
- Nothing but the Truth (2008) – director, writer, producer, actor
- Straw Dogs (2011) – director, writer
- The Outpost (2019) – director
- The Senior (2023) – director
- Lucky Strike (2026) – director

=== Short films ===
- The Nazi (2002) – director, writer

=== Television ===
- Line of Fire (2003–04) – creator, director, writer, executive producer
- Commander in Chief (2005–06) – creator, director, writer, executive producer
- Hell on Wheels (2012–15) – director
- American Odyssey (2015) – director
- Killing Reagan (2016) – director
- Damnation (2017) – director
