= Three Kings (Family Guy) =

- Family Guy episode
- Promotional poster for "Three Kings"
- Episode no.: Season 7 Episode 15
- Directed by: Dominic Bianchi
- Written by: Alec Sulkin
- Production code: 6ACX15
- Original air date: May 10, 2009

Guest appearances
- Richard Dreyfuss as Adult Petey; Roy Scheider as Adult Joey (Note: Scheider died in 2008, one year before the episode aired.); George Wendt as Norm Peterson; Adam West as Ace

Episode chronology
← Previous "We Love You, Conrad"	Next → "Peter's Progress"
- Family Guy season 7

"Three Kings", alternatively spelled "3 Kings", is the 15th episode in the seventh season of the American animated television series Family Guy. It originally aired on Fox in the United States on May 10, 2009. The episode is split into three segments, parodying films based on three Stephen King stories: Stand by Me, Misery and The Shawshank Redemption.

The episode was written by Alec Sulkin and directed by Dominic Bianchi. The episode received mostly positive reviews for its break from the usual storyline in the series, in addition to receiving some criticism from the Parents Television Council. According to Nielsen ratings, it was viewed in 6.47 million homes in its original airing. The episode featured guest performances by Richard Dreyfuss, Roy Scheider and George Wendt, along with several recurring guest voice actors for the series.

== Plot ==
The episode opens with Peter Griffin saying that Lois complains about him watching too much TV and not reading enough books. He then picks out three novels by "the greatest author of the last thousand years", Stephen King, and proceeds to share them with the viewer.

=== Stand by Me ===
In the summer of 1955, four 12-year-old boys — Petey LaChance (Peter, with Richard Dreyfuss' voice in his head narrating the story), Quag Chambers (Quagmire), Joey Duchamp (Joe with Roy Scheider's voice in his head, who starts talking with Dreyfuss until Joe stops them), and Cleve Brown (Cleveland) — set out to find a dead body in the woods, following a set of railroad tracks to find it. At the start of their trip, they try going through Old Man Pressman's (Stewie) junkyard, only to be chased out by Pressman and his dog Chopper (Brian). As they travel further down the tracks, they are chased across a bridge by a train, which ends up running over Joey's legs, as does another train that follows closely behind, which effectively cripples him. The others end up going back to Pressman's junkyard to get him a wheelchair.

Upon finding the body (which turns out to be Meg Griffin), they are confronted by the town bully Ace (Mayor West) and his gang, consisting of Beast-Man, Mer-Man, and Norm from Cheers, who come to take credit for finding the body. Ace threatens the boys with a knife, but Petey pulls out a gun to intimidate Ace, who swears he will come back for revenge and could get a gun tomorrow. However, Ace points out their next meeting will be inevitable, as they live in the same neighborhood (openly admitting he'd probably just find him the following day, kill him, and take the body anyway; this is elaborated enough that Petey himself declares it "a major hole in this story"), and Petey simply lets Ace take the body then and there to avoid further consequences. Upon returning home, the boys go their separate ways; Joey comes to terms with being crippled and creates a new wheelchair rugby game called "Don't-Feel-Sorry-For-Us-Ball", Cleve grows up to marry Rebecca Romijn (who is the real-life wife of Jerry O'Connell, who played the character of "the fat kid" in the actual film), and Quag grows up to become a famous Hollywood actor who eventually dies of a drug overdose (a reference to the fact River Phoenix, who played Chris Chambers in the actual film, went the same way and the unseen adult version of Chris dies, but in a different manner), while Petey's fate becomes a mystery.

=== Misery ===
Famed writer Paul Sheldon (Brian) has just finished his latest and final installment in his series entitled Snuggly Jeff, a series of children's books, in which he kills off the titular character so he can focus on more serious work, despite objections from his agent, Marcia (Lois). While driving through a snowstorm, Paul accidentally hits Stephen King with his car, causing Paul to swerve off the road and crash into a snowbank. Paul is knocked unconscious in his car, while King, thrown aside by the impact, manages to conceive and write an entire novel in midair before hitting the ground completely unscathed.

Paul is rescued by Stewie Wilkes (Stewie), a cross-dressed toddler and Paul's self-proclaimed number-one fan, who takes the injured Paul to his remote cabin. Upon finding and reading the manuscript of Paul's latest Snuggly Jeff book, Stewie is infuriated about the main character's death and forces Paul to rewrite it and bring Snuggly Jeff back to life, holding him hostage until he manages to do so. Stewie rejects the idea of bringing Snuggly Jeff back to life with a child's wish, calling it bad storytelling and comparing it to a plot hole in the film Contact.

After sending Stewie out for more paper, Paul finds several news articles in an album that imply Stewie is actually a serial killer. Just then, the local sheriff (Joe) appears, and is surprised to find Paul there. Before he can help him, however, Stewie blows his legs off with a shotgun. The sheriff then complains that he will now have to spend the rest of his life in a wheelchair, only to be shot again and killed by Stewie. Paul finally finishes the book and demands Stewie let him go, but Stewie refuses, knowing he could try to turn him in to the police and tell them he kidnapped him, held him hostage, and fondled him in his sleep, which Paul did not know originally. Paul's ultimate fate is left ambiguous as the story ends with a Magnum, P.I.-style credits roll.

Back in Peter's study, Peter begins to describe the iconic sequence in The Shining in which Danny Torrance steers his tricycle through the halls, asking "Can't you see Stewie doing that?" but tricks the audience by finishing with "Well, here's the Shawshank Redemption".

=== The Shawshank Redemption ===
Andy Dufresne (Peter) is sent to Shawshank Prison, though none of the inmates think much of him, particularly Red (Cleveland, who narrates the story). A month passes before Andy literally says two words to Red ("Vagina boob"), and later asks him for a rock hammer, claiming he carves Star Wars figurines out of stone. He also suggests in a poorly veiled manner that he will use the hammer to tunnel out of the prison. Andy and Red end up becoming fast friends, and Red provides him with the rock hammer. One day, the prison's stern warden Samuel Norton (Carter) takes a liking to Andy's figurines and offers to sell them so he can take all the money for himself, crippling Bogs (Joe), one of the inmates who had raped Andy in the shower, as a sign of good will (despite Andy saying that he liked him). Andy is then given permission to clean Norton's office, and, while doing so, plays a record of "Hollaback Girl" across the whole prison, which utterly confuses all the inmates and infuriates Norton, who calls Andy into his office and places him in solitary confinement for two months after Andy indirectly insults him.

Afterward, Andy grows determined to escape from Shawshank, and informs Red that he is going to Zihuatanejo in Mexico, telling him that if he should ever get out of prison, he should go to a hayfield in Buxton, Maine, and there will be a volcanic rock that would have "no earthly business being there", and a gift for him under it (although he admitted that his memory had been from 25 years prior and could be outdated, and a Walmart could have been built on the site, asking Red to buy some "nice cheap pants" instead if that is the case). During an inspection the next day, Andy has disappeared without a trace. In a fury, Norton throws one of Andy's rocks at a suggestive poster of David Cassidy on the wall of Andy's cell, tearing a hole through Cassidy's rectum. Norton then pulls the poster off, discovering a tunnel that Andy had made his escape through the night before. Andy is then shown breaking into a sewage pipe while Norton is distracted by watching an episode of Friends, allowing him to crawl out to freedom. Sometime later, Red is brought before a parole board and complains that the concept of rehabilitation is just a way for the board members to make themselves feel important, and declares he will start killing people as soon as he is released; for no apparent reason, Red is put on parole anyway and released from Shawshank. Red goes to the field in Buxton with the volcanic rock to fulfill his promise to Andy, finding a box beneath the rock containing money and a postcard asking if he remembers the name of the Mexican village Andy told him about; unfortunately, to Red's annoyance, he does not. Andy is then shown preparing a boat on a beach in Zihuatanejo, eagerly waiting for Red to arrive, though Red never does.

At the end of the show, Peter thanks Stephen King and says they will see him in court, then tells the viewers to "stay tuned for whatever Fox is limping to the barn with."

== Production ==
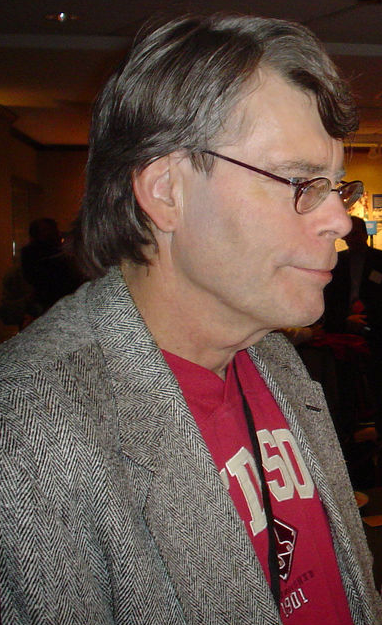
Writer Stephen King was approached by the Family Guy production team.

In his second episode for the season, the first being "Stew-Roids", the episode was written by series regular Alec Sulkin, and directed by Dominic Bianchi before the conclusion of the seventh production season. It was the last episode to be handdrawn in animatics.

The three stories were chosen, according to series creator Seth MacFarlane, mostly due to their "iconic" movie stature. Before producing the episode, writer Stephen King was approached by the Family Guy production team to create the episode, and obtain his written permission to create it; with King agreeing to allow the show to create the parody. King later stated that he enjoyed the episode and found it funny.

In addition to the regular cast, actor Richard Dreyfuss, actor Roy Scheider (who recorded his part in the episode shortly before his death in February 2008), and actor George Wendt guest starred in the episode. Recurring guest voice actors Chris Cox, actor Ralph Garman, writer Danny Smith, writer Alec Sulkin, and writer John Viener also made minor appearances. Actor Adam West guest starred in the episode as well.

== Reception ==
In its original airing in the United States, "Three Kings" was watched by 6.47 million homes and acquired a 3.2 rating in the 18–49 demographic, beating The Simpsons, American Dad! and King of the Hill. The Parents Television Council named Family Guy the Worst TV Show of the Week because of the episode's "violence, sexual references and contribution to the coarsening of contemporary culture."

The episode received generally positive reviews from television sources and critics. Ahsan Haque of IGN rated the episode an 8.4/10, calling the change of pace from the show's usual random storytelling "pleasant". The Misery segment was criticized as being flat, but was made up for by the other two, particularly The Shawshank Redemption. Steve Heisler of The A.V. Club gave it a B− and called the Stand by Me story "too earnest to turn into much of a comic romp" and that the gags in The Shawshank Redemption were "too expected". He called Misery a "hoot", stating: "Anything where Brian is held in the palm of diabolical Stewie works wonders for me".
