= We Love You, Conrad =

- Family Guy episode
- Brian, Lauren Conrad and Stewie in the promotional image for the episode, parodying an "iconic" The Hills photoshoot.
- Episode no.: Season 7 Episode 14
- Directed by: John Holmquist
- Written by: Cherry Chevapravatdumrong
- Production code: 6ACX19
- Original air date: May 3, 2009

Guest appearances
- Drew Barrymore as Jillian; Lauren Conrad as herself; Jimmy Fallon as himself (live-action sequence); Craig Ferguson as himself (live-action sequence); Bryce Dallas Howard as herself; Jay Leno as himself (live-action sequence); Audrina Patridge as herself; Whitney Port as herself (live-action sequence); Kate Todd as Heidi Montag; Sarah Utterback as Lindsay Lohan

Episode chronology
← Previous "Stew-Roids"	Next → "Three Kings"
- Family Guy season 7

"We Love You, Conrad" is the fourteenth episode in the seventh season of the American animated television series Family Guy. It originally aired on Fox in the United States on May 3, 2009. In the episode, Brian's ex-girlfriend Jillian is getting married. As he tries to move on, he starts dating The Hills star Lauren Conrad and the media begins raving about their relationship. Brian is starting to think they are the perfect match, but realizes he still has feelings for Jillian.

The episode was written by Cherry Chevapravatdumrong and directed by John Holmquist. Drew Barrymore returned as Jillian, and Lauren Conrad and Audrina Patridge guest starred as themselves. In her second guest appearance on the series, Conrad played a smart version of herself, which she said was fun to do. She took the recording sessions seriously and did not do any improvisation with her lines. The show's staff was ultimately impressed with her performance, and series creator Seth MacFarlane praised her stamina and how prepared she was before the recording sessions. The episode also featured live-action sequences with talk show hosts Jay Leno, Craig Ferguson and Jimmy Fallon.

"We Love You, Conrad" was met with generally positive reviews from critics, who enjoyed the episode and praised the live-action footage, in contrast to the negative reactions towards live-action clips of Conway Twitty from previous episodes. According to Nielsen ratings, "We Love You, Conrad" was watched by 6.67 million viewers in its original airing. The episode was released on DVD along with six other episodes from the season on June 15, 2010.

== Plot ==
The Griffins learn that Brian's ex-girlfriend, Jillian, is marrying "the perfect man in every aspect", Derek. Peter has been asked to walk Jillian down the aisle, and the others are invited except for Brian. As Brian feels like he is being excluded, Stewie invites him to go to dinner at a restaurant with him, Jillian and Derek. During dinner, Brian is upset to find that Derek speaks multiple languages, is a natural athlete and a good masseur and is well endowed. After dinner, he goes to a local bar to drown his sorrows. In a drunken stupor, he meets up with Lauren Conrad, the star of The Hills. However, he does not recognize her until they wake up in the same bed the next morning.

Stewie becomes ecstatic when he meets Lauren, and she invites him and Brian onto the set of the show to watch her. Against Brian's express wishes, Stewie leaks the relationship onto the Internet, resulting in a media circus and the claim that Lauren is a dumb blonde. Attempting to break off the relationship, Brian realizes that Lauren is a well-educated, articulate and rather accomplished woman who hides her intelligence from the public as American society derides intelligent women. In fact, she is one of the most intelligent women he has ever met. Brian invites her for dinner with the family, where Peter and Meg become interested in her accomplishments while Lois is not fond of her lectures. However Brian soon becomes even more uncomfortable with the relationship when he cannot keep up with her intelligence and tries comparing himself to Lauren.

Realizing that Brian had never gotten over his breakup with Jillian, Lauren advises him to see if Jillian still has feelings for him. Stewie suggests Brian date another woman in front of Jillian to make her jealous, but the attempt, with Stewie posing as Brian's date, Desiree, fails, though Stewie enjoys receiving attention from various men. The day before Jillian's wedding, Lauren encourages Brian to let her know about his still-strong feelings for her. Brian crashes the wedding ceremony to passionately profess his love for her. Jillian, however, gently tells Brian that he had his chance and blew it as her soulmate, as she decided to move on and he needs to as well. A sad and lonely Brian watches the couple dance and passionately kiss at the reception. Stewie comforts him and assures him he still has Lauren, but Brian admits that he cannot talk to her as he gave her worms.

== Production ==
The episode was written by Cherry Chevapravatdumrong and directed by John Holmquist. Drew Barrymore returned as Brian's ex-girlfriend Jillian, and The Hills stars Lauren Conrad and Audrina Patridge guest starred as themselves in both cartoon form and live-action form. The episode featured live-action sequences with Jay Leno, Craig Ferguson and Jimmy Fallon from their respective talk shows, The Tonight Show, The Late Late Show and Late Night. In addition to the major guest stars, actresses Sarah Utterback and Kate Todd guest starred in the episode as Lindsay Lohan and Heidi Montag, respectively. The episode marked Utterback's second appearance on the show, having previously provided the voice for Lohan in the season four episode "The Father, the Son and the Holy Fonz". John Viener, a writer for Family Guy, provided the voice of Jillian's husband, Derek Wilcox. Recurring guest voice actors James Burkholder, Jackson Douglas, Ralph Garman, Camille Guaty, writer Danny Smith, actor André Sogliuzzo, writer Alec Sulkin, and voice actor Wally Wingert also made minor appearances.

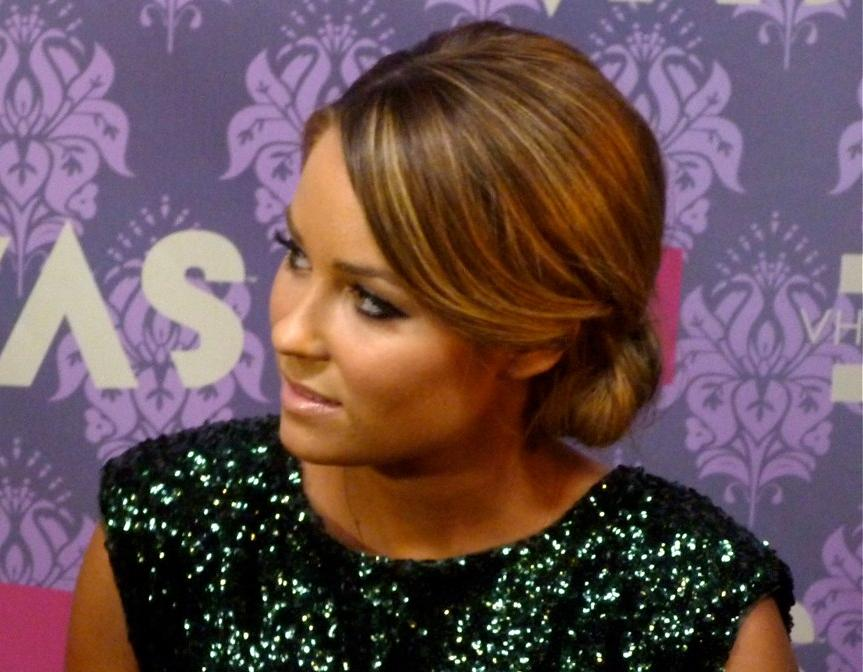
Lauren Conrad played an exaggerated version of herself, which she proclaimed as being fun to play.

The fact that Conrad would guest star on Family Guy was originally announced in October 2008. Creator Seth MacFarlane told Fox News, "I thought it would be funny to see if we could get [Conrad] to read very, very dense historical documents centering around the second World War, [...] Lauren did one scene where she had to read a paragraph on scientific self-analysis, which I thought was funny." The staff was impressed with Conrad's performance, saying that she "took it very seriously." Conrad praised her time at the show, calling it "amazing", and said that "they destroy me in it. I'm totally making fun of myself. [...] It was funny, I had to go over historical facts and like, biology and weird formulas I had no idea about." Conrad explained that she is playing a character on The Hills, "because America likes dumb people", and that "The idea in the episode is that they make fun of me for being dumb, and then discover that I'm actually a genius, [...] It's a more exaggerated version of who I am, but fun to play."

Conrad first met MacFarlane while recording a Laguna Beach: The Real Orange County clip for the season five episode "Prick Up Your Ears". She had watched Family Guy for years and considered Stewie her favorite character. Conrad stuck to the script and did not do any improvisation while recording for this episode. In an interview with People, she revealed that she has no plans on getting into acting, and even calls herself an "awful actor" and admits that she cannot memorize lines. However, she enjoyed recording for this episode and hired an acting coach to help her get through the lines. Even though she enjoyed the experience, she said that "[acting is] not really something I'm interested in." She had to do a lot of research before recording, because "there were a lot of facts and a lot of big words" and she "had to say it as if it was coming to [her] very easily." Her acting coach advised her to learn the lines ahead of time so that if she seemed like she "really understood what [she] was talking about, it would come through a little more true." MacFarlane commented on this, saying, "She made an effort [to understand the text], so let me just put it that way." He ultimately praised her performance, calling it "surprisingly fantastic", and said: "She came in, and she'd prepared before she even arrived. She hired an acting coach, with her own money, and she nailed it. She never once complained, and it was a long session. There was a lot of dialog. Her stamina was astonishing."

== Reception and release ==
In its original broadcast in the United States on May 3, 2009, "We Love You, Conrad" was watched by 6.67 million viewers and was the most watched show in Fox's Animation Domination block that night, beating The Simpsons, American Dad! and King of the Hill. The episode acquired a 3.5 Nielsen rating in the 18–49 demographic, finishing second in its timeslot after ABC's Desperate Housewives. The episode also acquired a 4.4 rating in the 18–34 demographic, finishing first in its timeslot.

The episode received generally positive reviews from television sources and critics. Although the live-action sequences with Conway Twitty from previous episodes were highly criticized, IGN writer Ahsan Haque felt that the live-action footage in this episode "blends in pretty well". Haque praised Barrymore's portrayal of Jillian in the episode, saying that she had "some great comedy moments." He went on to grade the episode 8 out of 10, and said that the live-action footage "seemed to work somehow here, and the storyline took center stage here" and that "you can't argue against an attempt to tell an actual story, and for that reason, this episode's definitely worth watching." Steve Heisler of The A.V. Club praised the live-action footage as well, saying that he "liked the splicing in of late night hosts and their jokes about Brian and [Lauren Conrad], if only to add a certain element of timeliness to the material." Heisler graded the episode B−, the second highest grade of the night. He said that "often Family Guy is unbearable" and "has established a certain style and rhythm, jokes come off as smug", but said that he found himself enjoying the episode "more and more as it went on [...] because it was willing to fully embrace the silliness and ridiculousness of what it was setting up."

The episode, along with the six other episodes from Family Guy's seventh season, were released on a three-disc DVD set in the United States on June 15, 2010. The set included brief audio commentaries for most episodes, excluding "We Love You, Conrad", "Stew-Roids", "Quagmire's Baby and "Dog Gone". The set also included a collection of deleted scenes, behind-the-scenes footage from the production of "Road to the Multiverse" and a Family Guy karaoke featurette.

== Cultural references ==
"We Love You, Conrad" includes several pop culture references. When Jillian and Peter are planning the wedding, Peter points out that only the last three words that musician Sting sings are understandable. At the restaurant, Jillian says that her fiancé speaks "Orange", instead of Mandarin. Stewie calls Caitlyn Jenner (then Bruce) (Note: Jenner changed her name due to gender transition in 2015.) an "elegant, beautiful Dutch woman." The Genesis cave from Star Trek II: The Wrath of Khan appears in the episode, and the scene is mirrored line for line. The episode depicts The Hills star Spencer Pratt as an orangutan from Planet of the Apes. When Brian, Lauren Conrad and Stewie are watching The Hills, it suddenly cuts to footage from The A-Team. In an attempt to impress Lauren, Brian wears Austin Powers glasses. Stewie wears a "unisex hat," which turns out to be the hat worn by Eliza Doolittle in the film adaptation of My Fair Lady. The episode also makes references to actress Lindsay Lohan and the cartoon character Mr. Magoo. The promotional image for this episode, featuring Brian, Lauren Conrad and Stewie with his woman's disguise, is a parody of an "iconic" The Hills photoshoot with Audrina Patridge, Conrad and Whitney Port. In addition, the title of the episode itself refers to a song from Bye Bye Birdie, a 1960-Broadway musical and its film adaptation. Lastly, the episode includes a reference to Bill Cosby and Lauren Conrad in a "fake sex tape" made with "state of the art computer animation", in the pursuit of publicity which, Conrad says, "keeps this franchise rolling."
