= Peter's Progress =

- Family Guy episode
- King Stewart surrenders Lady Redbush to Griffin Peterson
- Episode no.: Season 7 Episode 16
- Directed by: Brian Iles; Steve Beers _{(live-action sequences)}
- Written by: Wellesley Wild
- Production code: 6ACX20
- Original air date: May 17, 2009

Guest appearances
- John Ross Bowie; Neil Patrick Harris as Barney Stinson; Brody Hutzler; Derwin Jordan; Keri Lynn Pratt; David Pressman; Josh Radnor as Ted Mosby; Martin Savage; Jason Segel as Marshall Eriksen; Alexander Siddig; Erik von Detten as Shovin' Buddy

Episode chronology
← Previous "Three Kings"	Next → "Road to the Multiverse"
- Family Guy season 7

"Peter's Progress" is the 16th and final episode in the seventh season of the American animated television series Family Guy. It originally aired on Fox in the United States on May 17, 2009. In the episode, a psychic reads Peter's palms and discovers he led a fascinating past life as Griffin Peterson, a dignified gentleman in 17th-century England, who was the original founder of Quahog.

The episode was written by Wellesley Wild and directed by Brian Iles. It received mixed reviews from critics for its storyline and many cultural references. According to Nielsen ratings, it was viewed in 7.33 million homes in its original airing. The episode featured guest performances by John Ross Bowie, Neil Patrick Harris, Brody Hutzler, Derwin Jordan, Keri Lynn Pratt, David Pressman, Josh Radnor, Martin Savage, Jason Segel, Alexander Siddig and Erik von Detten, along with several recurring guest voice actors for the series. This episode marks Cleveland Brown's final regular appearance on Family Guy until the episode "He's Bla-ack!" in season 12 where he made his official return to the show.

== Plot ==
Cleveland introduces his Jamaican cousin Madame Claude to Peter, Joe, and Quagmire, saying she is a psychic. Cleveland offers to have her read their palms and determine past lives they have had. Madame Claude then determines that Joe was once an octopus whose tentacles were bitten off by a shark, and Quagmire was Jack the Ripper. After Peter suggests that he was a strawberry in a past life, Claude reads Peter's palm, she discovers that he was Griffin Peterson, the supposed founder of Quahog where the previously mentioned history of Quahog was a myth. Most of the episode follows the story of this past life, the main characters therein having the appearance of regular Family Guy characters.

In 17th-century England, Griffin Peterson proposes to the love of his life Lady Redbush (Lois) upon getting the approval from Carter Redbush. The ruthless King Stewart III (Stewie) has the court jester (Brian) tell him some jokes after "deleting" How I Met Your Mother from his "TiVo" (represented as archers killing Josh Radnor, Jason Segel, and Neil Patrick Harris). While being carried around in his litter, King Stewart spots Lady Redbush strolling through town with Griffin Peterson and decides that he wants to marry her. While Griffin Peterson is on the way to his wedding, Stewart secretly kidnaps him, exiling him to the New World on one of the outgoing ships. As Lady Redbush waits in growing angst, King Stewart walks into the church. He tells Lady Redbush that Griffin Peterson is dead and proceed to marry her himself.

At sea, Griffin Peterson meets fellow exiles Joe (exiled for pleasuring himself in front of a carving), Quagmire (exiled for having sex with an underage girl), and Seamus. Upon reaching the New World, Griffin Peterson establishes the colony of Quahog, which eventually grows into a thriving settlement. Griffin Peterson moves on with his life, even marrying another woman (Meg).

Back in London, Later Redbush suffers a dull sexless marriage with King Stewart since they're never available to each other. Lady Redbush continues to lament Griffin's supposed death until the jester reveals the truth by showing her the newspaper article about Quahog's founding. The jester stated that he was to keep quiet about this under threat of execution. Lady Redbush and the jester immediately depart for the New World on one of the slave ships. In Quahog, Griffin Peterson has grown irritated with his current wife until Lady Redbush arrives. Griffin Peterson and Lady Redbush are reunited and Griffin "divorces" his current wife by killing her with a blunderbuss.

Six months later, King Stewart learns that Redbush is gone and he makes his way to Quahog to reclaim his wife and kill Griffin Peterson. King Stewart's army arrives in Quahog where they terrorise the colony (similar to a scene from Blazing Saddles). King Stewart orders Cockney First Lieutenant (Chris) to search every house for them. Upon being discovered by the First Lieutenant, Griffin Peterson and Lady Redbush are confronted by King Stewart. Griffin Peterson threatens to kill the officer, while King Stewart threatens to kill Redbush. After exchanging threats without getting anywhere, Griffin and Stewart decide to settle their dispute with a talent show, with the winner winning Lady Redbush's hand in marriage, and ownership of the town of Quahog. For his act, King Stewart steals his jester's mostly unfunny jokes about his Aunt Frieda. However, Griffin, Quagmire, Joe, Cleveland, Mort, and Seamus effectively steal the show with a techno-rock number from Revenge of the Nerds. This was enough to defeat King Stewart in the talent show. After King Stewart and his army leaves for England, Griffin and Redbush remain in Quahog to live happily ever after.

After the story is told, Peter, Quagmire, Cleveland, Joe, and Madame Claude see a promo ad for Cross-Armed Opposites.

== Production ==
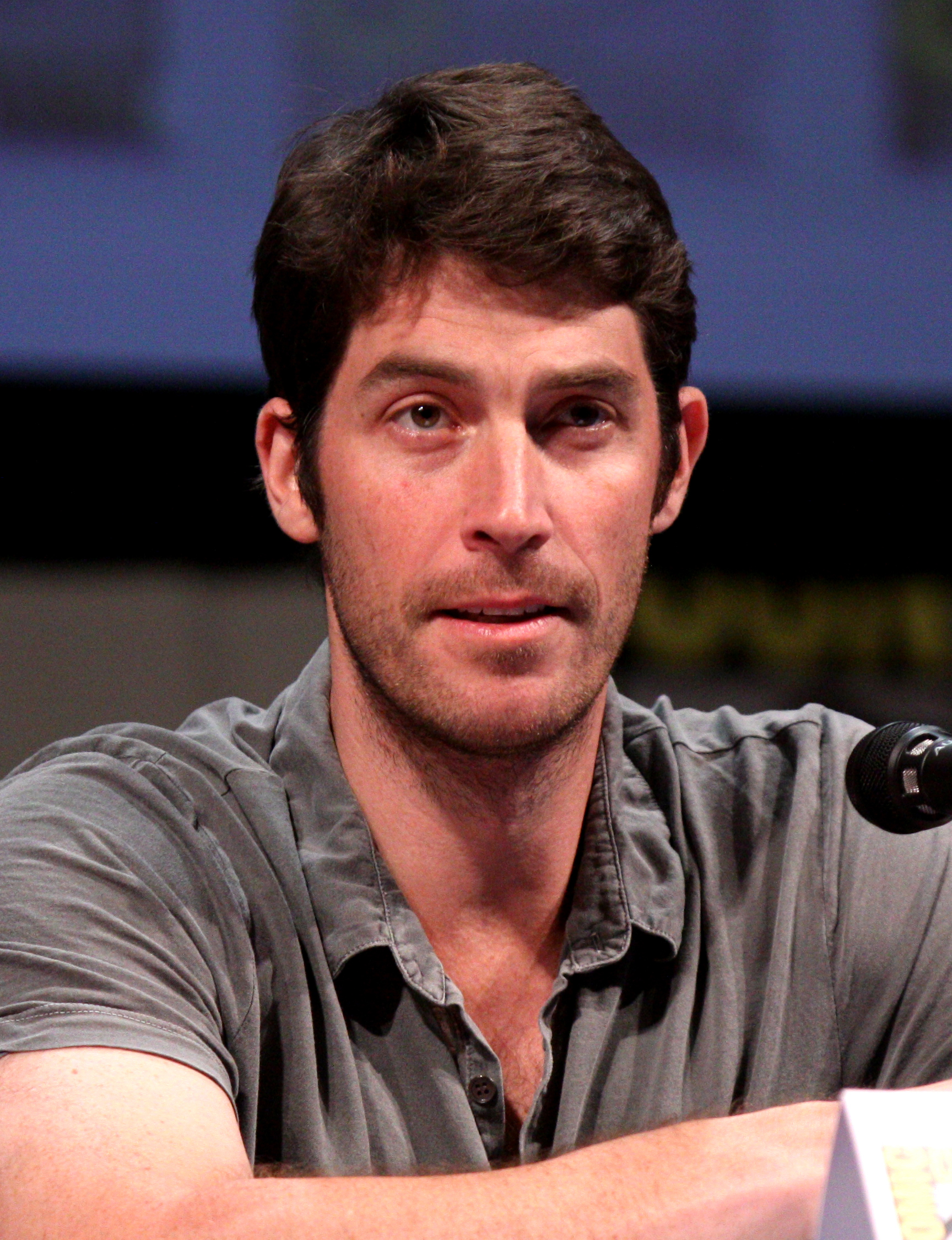
Writer John Viener provided the voice of Madame Claude in this episode.

The episode was written by Wellesley Wild and directed by Brian Iles. The live action sequences used throughout the episode to promote supposed shows on Fox was directed by Bones director Steve Beers. The night the episode aired, the "Animation Domination" block was co-hosted by an animated version of rapper Eminem and Stewie Griffin. Eminem, who provided his own voice, said that it was a "thrill to work with Stewie" and that he is a "big fan of talking babies and their humor".

In addition to the main cast, Josh Radnor, Jason Segel and Neil Patrick Harris guest starred in the episode as their characters from the CBS sitcom How I Met Your Mother. Family Guy writer John Viener was the voice of Cleveland's cousin, Madame Claude. Recurring guest voice actor John G. Brennan and writers Alec Sulkin, Danny Smith, Tom Devanney and Mark Hentemann made minor appearances in the episode. Alexander Siddig, Martin Savage, John Ross Bowie, Brody Hutzler, Derwin Jordan, Keri Lynn Pratt, David Pressman and Erik von Detten guest-starred as well.

== Cultural references ==
The title is a reference to The Pilgrim's Progress. The episode begins with a cutaway gag featuring Alan Rickman's answering machine. When Madame Claude tells everyone who they were in a past life, she reveals that Quagmire was Jack the Ripper. Also, when Madame Claude first speaks, Peter says that she sounds like Sebastian the crab from Disney's The Little Mermaid King Stewart III orders to kill the cast of How I Met Your Mother after he is displeased with their performance. Griffin Peterson's act in the talent show is a reference to the act the Lambda Lambda Lambdas perform at the homecoming in the 1984 film Revenge of the Nerds. As a running gag throughout the episode, Fox promos appear on the bottom of the screen for made-up shows including Shovin' Buddies, Slowly Rotating Black Man, and Cross-Armed Opposites, parodying stereotypical types of Fox mid-show advertising. Griffin Peterson says that he is the happiest guy in the world because he's on his way to get married and there are "290 years separating me from the films of Kevin Smith." A clip is shown of Madonna celebrating her 16th birthday, suggesting she is over 300 years old. During King Stewart's invasion of the settlement the music and lyrics are identical to that of Mel Brooks' Blazing Saddles, with Rock Ridge changed to Quahog. A lady says of King Stewart, "I didn't vote for him," alluding to Monty Python and the Holy Grail. Harry MacAfee from the film Bye Bye Birdie makes an appearance.

Parts of the narrative also show similarity to Captain Blood, a novel by Rafael Sabatini, and to the film Restoration. In Captain Blood, the protagonist is transported as a prisoner to a new world colony for false crimes against the king. In Restoration, the king attempts to steal the affections of the protagonist's love interest. Both works are set within the general time period featured in the episode.

== Reception ==
In its original airing in the United States, "Peter's Progress" was watched by 7.33 million homes, which was up from the previous episode, and was the most watched show in the "Animation Domination" block, beating the season finales of The Simpsons, American Dad! and King of the Hill. It acquired a 3.7 rating in the 18–49 demographic, finishing third in its timeslot after the season finales of Survivor: Tocantins and Desperate Housewives.

The episode received mixed reviews from critics. Ahsan Haque of IGN said that "Family Guy has never really done anything particularly special for the last episode of any season [...] and despite the obvious efforts to increase the animation quality and try to tell a complete story in this episode, it didn't turn out to be the winning effort that will keep fans eagerly awaiting the show's return next season". Emily St. James of The A.V. Club gave the episode a D, and called it an "unfortunate and unfunny flashback [...] with lots of incest gags [that] was genuinely queasy-making, but not in a way that made anyone laugh from the shock of recognition or anything like that", but said that Family Guy can be "damn funny when it wants to be", referring to the Fox promos that take up the bottom quarter of the screen. Robin Pierson of The TV Critic gave the episode a positive review, stating: "Good fun story, good fun jokes", but said that the end "felt flat" because of the Revenge of the Nerds music sequence.
