= Quahog (Family Guy) =

Fictional setting of the animated sitcom Family Guy

- Family Guy location
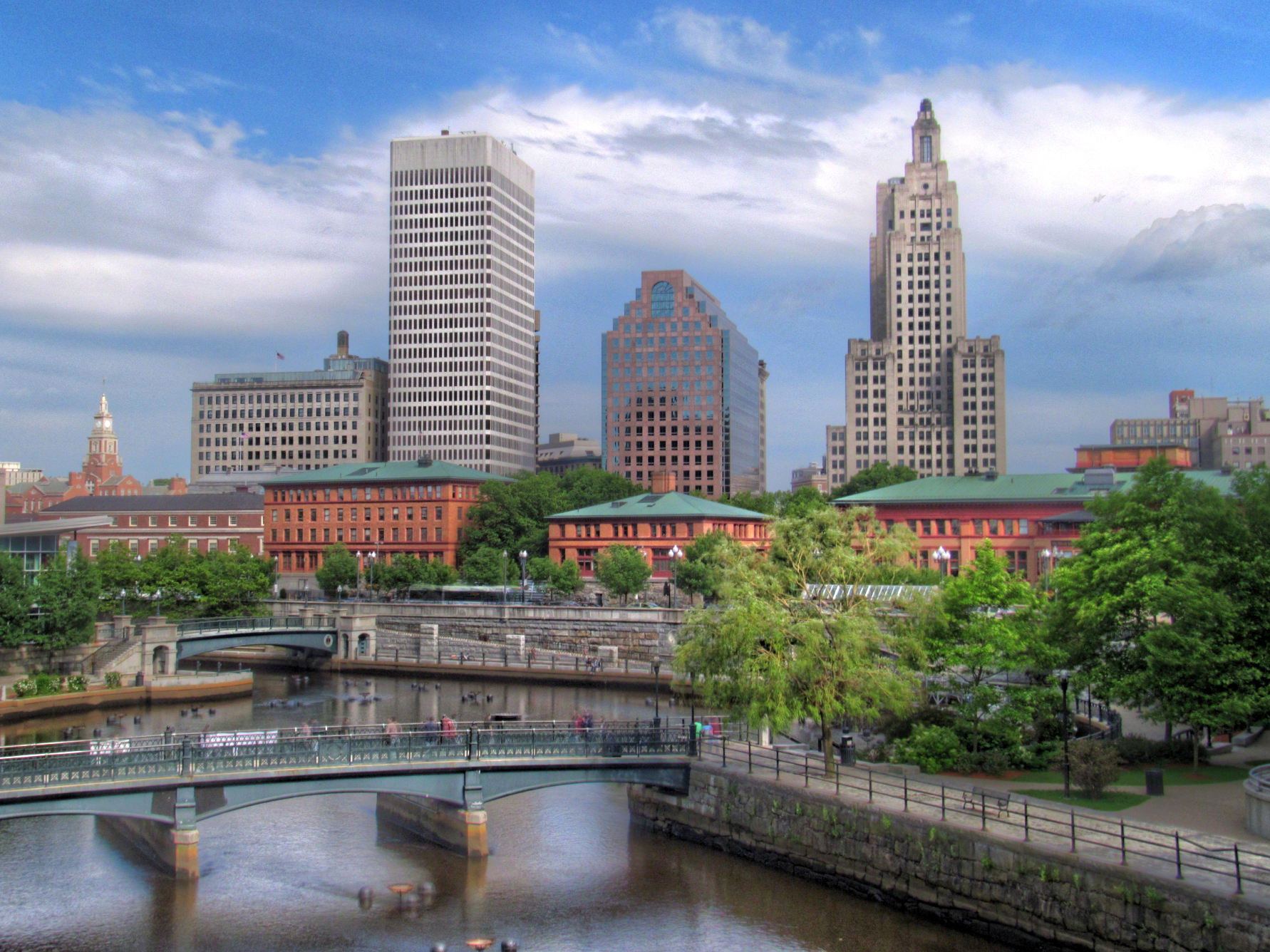
- The Providence Skyline that appears behind the Griffin House
- First appearance: "Death Has a Shadow" (1999)
- Created by: Seth MacFarlane
- Genre: Animated sitcom

In-universe information
- Type: City / Population: Around 100,000
- Ruled by: Wild West (Mayor); Adam West (former mayor- deceased); Lois Griffin (former mayor)
- Location: Newport County, Rhode Island, New England, U.S.
- Locations: Spooner Street; The Drunken Clam; Pawtucket Brewery; Lake Quahog; Adam West High School (Formerly James Woods Regional High School); Stop 'N Shop; Spinazola Apartments; Martin Mull Elementary School; Goldman's Pharmacy; Quahog 5 News Station; Buddy Cianci Junior High School; Quahog Mini-Mart; Quahog Mall; Quahog City Hall; Quahog Arena/Civic Center; Barrington Country Club; Quahog Asylum; Quahog Police Station; Quahog International Airport; Quahog Hospital; Quahog Theatre; Quahog Cinema; Quahog Public Library The Putthole; Quahog Urban Museum
- Characters: Peter; Lois; Meg; Chris; Stewie; Brian; Glenn; Cleveland; Joe; Herbert

Quahog (/ˈk(w)oʊhɒɡ/ K(W)OH-hog) is a fictional city in the U.S. state of Rhode Island that serves as the primary setting of the American animated sitcom Family Guy and other related media. The town is located in Newport County, and is modeled after Cranston, Rhode Island, part of the Providence metropolitan area. The Griffin family, the Browns, the Swansons, and Glenn Quagmire live on Spooner Street, with the Griffin family residing at 31 Spooner Street. As revealed in the seventh-season episode "Fox-y Lady", the Town's ZIP code is 00093. Peter's birth certificate in the thirteenth-season episode "Quagmire's Mom" gives Peter's birth location as Newport County.

== Fictional history ==
In 17th-century England, an ancestor of Peter, Griffin Peterson, founds Quahog after being exiled to the New World and later wins ownership of it in a talent show against his king. In the seventh-season episode "Peter's Progress", Cleveland's Jamaican cousin Madame Claude reads Peter's palm and discovers that he was related to Griffin Peterson, the supposed founder of Quahog where the previously mentioned history of Quahog was a myth. Quahog was named after the famous mafioso and serial killer of women, Lenny "The Quahog" Paradiso.

== People and locations ==
=== Mayor ===
Adam West was the mayor of Quahog until the death of his namesake voice actor. He appeared on a recurring basis from his first appearance in season 2 until his final appearance in season 17. Quahog's current mayor is Mayor West's cousin, Wild Wild West, voiced by Sam Elliott, who was introduced in the episode "Wild Wild West". Lois Griffin was also mayor of Quahog for a short period of time in the episode "It Takes a Village Idiot, and I Married One".

=== News anchors ===
The town's local "celebrities" are Tom Tucker, an arrogant, baritone-voiced news anchor at Channel 5, and Diane Simmons, the station's 40-year-old former news co-anchor who was killed off in "And Then There Were Fewer". The two work alongside Tricia Takanawa, a stereotypical Asian reporter who speaks with a nasal monotone cadence; and Blaccu-Weather meteorologist Ollie Williams, a fast-talking chubby African-American man who rarely speaks for more than about 1 to 2 seconds.

=== The Drunken Clam ===
The Drunken Clam is a bar owned by Jerome and formerly Horace (who died in "Save the Clam") that Peter frequently visits along with his friends: Joe Swanson, a paraplegic police officer; former deli owner turned mailman Cleveland Brown and sex-crazed airline pilot bachelor Glenn Quagmire. The Drunken Clam is easily recognized by its animated neon sign on the roof at the front of the building. It depicts a clam swigging from a bottle and becoming intoxicated, judging by the "xx" eyes and the bubbles rising.

The Drunken Clam is also known as the location in which many of the group's schemes and adventures are hatched or take place. Peter works as an assembly worker in a toy factory in early episodes but is a self-employed fisherman and an employee of the fictitious Pawtucket Brewery in later episodes. Peter entertains the Clam's patrons on the piano while drunk in "Wasted Talent".

In "One if by Clam, Two if by Sea", after a hurricane, The Drunken Clam became "The Clam's Head Pub", much to Peter and the guys' disgust, as new owner Brit Nigel Pinchley took over. Despite their best efforts of them to claim back the bar, the Brits had convinced them to leave. However, after Pinchley burned down the Clam's Head Pub as an insurance fraud, and his subsequent arrest and execution, Horace returned from Florida, having had an alligator lay eggs in his lower intestine and getting into a knife-fight with his mother, losing a testicle in the process. The Clam was rebuilt by Horace, Peter and the gang and began running again. The episode reveals that Peter has been going to the Clam since at least 1977.

In "Blind Ambition", Peter falls off its roof and kills Joan Cusack. Also, in that same episode, the bar burns to the ground when God tries to impress a woman by lighting her cigarette with a thunderbolt. God and Jesus escape by driving away in their Cadillac Escalade, but a blind Peter, without realizing it, rescues Horace from the inferno and becomes a local hero. The Drunken Clam becomes a Karaoke Bar in "Don't Make Me Over", as the gang helps Horace to put the bar back on its feet against the competition from a new shopping mall. Other renovation attempts, including the original theme to the film Coyote Ugly, had previously failed.

As seen in "Stewie B. Goode", Brian takes Stewie to the Clam in an effort to persuade him of the dangers of alcohol. Brian is unsuccessful in his attempt, and is so drunk that he is unable to drive, giving an equally intoxicated Stewie his car keys. Stewie crashes Brian's Prius through the wall of the bar, an event shown on the news by Tom Tucker in an attempt to expose Peter. In "Meet the Quagmires", Death shows up when Horace falls off his ladder in the Clam, while trying to fix the TV—Horace is only knocked unconscious. This allows Peter to ask Death to return him to the 1980s, so he can live a wild youth. Part of that experience includes visiting the 1980s bar—then called "St. Elmo's Clam"—a reference to the electrical phenomenon and to the song and movie. "St Elmo's Fire". Here Peter plays "Menstrual Ms. Pac-Man", meets and makes out with actress Molly Ringwald, and joins Cleveland at an evening disco. This contradicts the bar's appearance in "One if by Clam, Two if by Sea", where in the same year, it was still The Drunken Clam. The Clam's back room, complete with a table tennis table, is seen in "Hell Comes to Quahog", in which Joe becomes competitive and beats Peter, Cleveland and Quagmire at table tennis.

In the sixth-season episode "Believe It or Not, Joe's Walking on Air", the guys' significant others, Lois, Bonnie and even Muriel, wife of recurring character and Jewish pharmacist Mort Goldman, as well as Cleveland's girlfriend at the time, Bernice, begin hanging out at the Clam, forcing the guys to open the Quahog Men's Club. The guys were able to reclaim the Clam soon after. Due to Cleveland's absence from Family Guy, Peter, Quagmire and Joe meet their new black friend, Jerome, in "Jerome Is the New Black". However, the vacancy reopens at the end of the episode. In "Road to the Multiverse", it is revealed that if Frank Sinatra had never been born, The Clam would be long abandoned as of 2009 in the Apocalyptic Universe, as it is seen in shambles. Horace dies in "Save the Clam", leaving the guys to try to find a way to save the bar from foreclosure. Eventually, Jerome shows up and reveals he bought the Clam with his sports earnings, allowing it to stay open.

In "Finders Keepers", a waiter tells Stewie that his placemat is a real treasure map, then tells a probably false story about Miles "Chatterbox" Musket which impresses Peter, despite Lois's insistence that it is a joke. Refusing to give up, Peter and Lois search leads them to The Drunken Clam. Behind a painting of legendary Quahog founder Miles "Chatterbox" Musket, they find a treasure chest containing an expired restaurant coupon for a free meal which was a promotion by The Founding Father Restaurant. The Clam is parodied as "Ye Soused Mackerel" in the Romeo and Juliet segment of "Heart Burn".

== References to real-world locations ==
Family Guy creator Seth MacFarlane resided in Providence, Rhode Island during his time as a student at the Rhode Island School of Design, and the show contains distinct Rhode Island landmarks similar to real-world locations. MacFarlane often borrows the names of Rhode Island locations and icons such as Pawtucket for the fictional beer brand and Brewery Pawtucket Patriot Ale and Pawtucket Brewery, Buddy Cianci named after a former Providence Mayor and used for the local Junior High School, Buddy Cianci Junior High school. The former local high school was named James Woods Regional High School after James Woods, an actor who was raised in Warwick, Rhode Island. The high school was named for the Mayor (voiced by Adam West) and the local elementary school Martin Mull Elementary is named after Martin Mull, a fellow RISD graduate. Several times every episode (except for the Star Wars episodes), the actual Providence skyline can be seen in the distance. The three buildings that are depicted are, from left to right and furthest to closest: One Financial Plaza, 50 Kennedy Plaza, and the Industrial National Bank Building. This ordering of buildings and the angle at which they are viewed indicates that Quahog is primarily west of downtown Providence. Quahog is often stated to be either Johnston, Cranston, North Providence, Scituate, or a western portion of Providence itself. However, in a few episodes, Quahog is shown to have a coastline in episodes such as "Fifteen Minutes of Shame", "Fore, Father", and "Perfect Castaway", which only Cranston and Providence possess. This is supported by the fact that the real-world "31 Spooner Street" is located in Providence, immediately due west of Roger Williams Park. In the episode "Stewie Goes for a Drive", it is implied that Rhode Island Route 138 runs through the town, which would place it much further south than Providence. MacFarlane has said in the DVD commentary for the episode "When You Wish Upon a Weinstein" that the street was named after Spooner Hill Road, which is his childhood home. Also, a map seen in "Fifteen Minutes of Shame" does not resemble a map of the neighborhood of Spooner Street. Quahog has an international airport, which in real life is only in Warwick. The show also frequently depicts Quahog as having certain features that no city in Rhode Island has, such as an extensive metro system.

In "Not All Dogs Go To Heaven", the "zoom out" at the end shows Quahog to be somewhere between Cranston and Warwick, almost directly north of the Theodore Francis Green Airport. In "E. Peterbus Unum", a map of Rhode Island is shown, with Quahog shaded in red, shown in the vicinity of Tiverton. Quahog is also shown to be within driving distance to Newport, which is also where Lois Griffin's parents Babs and Carter Pewterschmidt live. In an interview with Providence's Fox affiliate WNAC-TV, MacFarlane stated that the town is modeled after Cranston.

== Name significance ==
A quahog is an edible clam.

In a 2007 interview with The New York Times, producer and writer Danny Smith stated: "When we first started doing the show, Fox wanted us to make the show specific to one town or region. I remember turning to Seth and saying, 'Oh, man, Rhode Island. It has to be Rhode Island.'" For Smith, the town had to be fictional. "Years ago, I was writing for a show called Nurses and I wrote a joke about Pawtucket. It was just a joke, but a lot of people from Pawtucket took it seriously, including the Mayor of Pawtucket. I was vilified back home on talk radio. I had visions of people from Pawtucket chasing me down Benefit Street with pitchforks and torches. I didn't want to risk having another town angry with me, so it was my idea to create Quahog, Rhode Island."
