= Family Guy season 7 =

Season of television series Family Guy

Family Guy
- Season 7
- DVD covers for Volumes 7 and 8
- Showrunners: David A. Goodman; Chris Sheridan
- Starring: Seth MacFarlane; Alex Borstein; Seth Green; Mila Kunis; Mike Henry
- No. of episodes: 16

Release
- Original network: Fox
- Original release: September 28, 2008 – May 17, 2009

Season chronology
- ← Previous; Season 6 Next → Season 8

The seventh season of Family Guy first aired on the Fox network from September 28, 2008, to May 17, 2009, before being released as two DVD box sets and syndicated. The animated television series follows the dysfunctional Griffin family (father Peter, mother Lois, daughter Meg, son Chris, baby Stewie and their anthropomorphic dog Brian), who reside in the fictional town of Quahog, in the U.S. state of Rhode Island. The show features the voices of series creator Seth MacFarlane, Alex Borstein, Seth Green, and Mila Kunis in the roles of the Griffin family.

The season included hold-over episodes from the sixth season, which was cut short due to the 2007–2008 Writers Guild of America strike. It received a mixed reception from critics, the more-mixed reviews criticizing the overuse of cutaways and the more positive praising its story-based episodes. The seventh season contains some of the series' most acclaimed episodes (including "Road to Germany" and "Family Gay") and controversial episodes like "420", which caused the Venezuelan government to ban the show from its networks. The season was nominated for a Primetime Emmy Award for Outstanding Comedy Series, making Family Guy the first animated series to be nominated in this category since The Flintstones in 1961.

The Volume Seven DVD box set was released in Region 1 on June 16, 2009, Region 2 on November 2, 2009 and Region 4 on September 29, 2009. Nine of the sixteen episodes are included in this volume. The remaining seven episodes of the season were released on the Volume Eight DVD box set in Region 1 on June 15, 2010, Region 2 on November 1, 2010 and Region 4 on June 15, 2011.

== Voice cast and characters ==
- Seth MacFarlane as Peter Griffin, Brian Griffin, Stewie Griffin, Glenn Quagmire, Tom Tucker, Carter Pewterschmidt, Dr. Elmer Hartman, Seamus Levine.
- Alex Borstein as Lois Griffin, Tricia Takanawa, Loretta Brown
- Seth Green as Chris Griffin
- Mila Kunis as Meg Griffin
- Mike Henry as Cleveland Brown, Bruce

=== Supporting characters ===
- H. Jon Benjamin as Carl
- Johnny Brennan as Mort Goldman
- Carrie Fisher as Angela
- Mark Hentemann as Opie
- Phil LaMarr as Ollie Williams, Judge
- Patrick Warburton as Joe Swanson
- Gary Cole as Principal Shepherd
- Adam West as Mayor Adam West

== Episodes ==
No. overall	No. in season	Title	Directed by	Written by	Original release date	Prod. code	U.S. viewers (millions)
111	1	"Love, Blactually"	Cyndi Tang	Mike Henry	September 28, 2008	6ACX03	9.09
Brian begins dating a woman named Carolyn, but decides not to have sex with her because (as Stewie points out) none of his relationships have worked because he has sex immediately after they meet. After three weeks, Brian finds out that Carolyn is dating Cleveland because she thinks Brian only wants friendship. This leads Brian to convince Cleveland's ex-wife Loretta to reconcile with him so Brian can date Carolyn. Loretta invites Cleveland to a hotel to reconcile with him; however, Cleveland explains that he forgives her for cheating on him but he must move on with his life. Cleveland then visits Carolyn, whom he discovers is cheating on him with Quagmire. He goes to see Brian, and they make amends, as Cleveland notes that he is feeling a burning sensation when he urinates.
112	2	"I Dream of Jesus"	Mike Kim	Brian Scully	October 5, 2008	6ACX05	8.38
Peter buys a record of his favorite song ("Surfin' Bird" by the Trashmen) and listens to it incessantly, annoying his family. Eventually, Stewie and Brian steal (and destroy) the record. Distraught, Peter goes to the record store for another copy and discovers that the clerk is Jesus Christ; Jesus explains that he returns every 100 years or so to check on the world. Peter befriends Jesus, and convinces him to reveal himself. Jesus then becomes a celebrity, neglecting his friendship with Peter; he is then found drunk in an apartment and arrested. Peter pays his bail; Jesus realizes he still has some maturing to do and decides to return to his home. Before he leaves, Jesus gives Peter a present: another record of "Surfin' Bird".
113	3	"Road to Germany"	Greg Colton	Patrick Meighan	October 19, 2008	6ACX08	9.01
During a party at the Griffin house Mort Goldman accidentally steps into Stewie's time machine (mistaking it for a bathroom), forcing Brian and Stewie to take a return pad and go after him. They find Mort in a Warsaw, Poland synagogue, thinking he is in heaven since he sees dead family members there. They soon realize the date is September 1, 1939, the day of the Nazi invasion of Poland and the beginning of World War II. The return pad breaks and they decide to go to England, where it will be safe to repair it. In England, Stewie realizes that the return pad is out of uranium fuel and Brian suggests they find some in a nuclear-testing facility in Berlin. At the facility Stewie disguises himself as Hitler; the other two disguise themselves as Nazi officers, and obtain the needed uranium. They then encounter the real Hitler (who orders their execution), but they escape on the return pad back to their own time and arrives back in Stewie's room 30 seconds before Mort entered the time machine. To keep these events from repeating, Stewie kills the version of Mort who traveled with them.
114	4	"Baby Not on Board"	Julius Wu	Mark Hentemann	November 2, 2008	6ACX07	9.99
The Griffins decide to take a trip to the Grand Canyon. They inadvertently leave Stewie in the house, not realizing it until they are in New York (where they call Cleveland and Quagmire to check on him). When Stewie realizes he is alone, he decides to enjoy his solitude. Cleveland and Quagmire arrive, and Stewie mistakes them for intruders and sprays them with tear gas. Realizing his mistake, he chains them to the Griffins' basement wall and leaves the DirecTV instructional channel on to occupy their attention. Lois becomes worried after not hearing from Cleveland or Quagmire, so the Griffins return home. After Stewie finishes all the food in the house he realizes he needs his family, and embraces them when they return.
115	5	"The Man with Two Brians"	Dominic Bianchi	John Viener	November 9, 2008	6ACX09	8.47
After Brian is injured, the Griffins think he is getting old. Peter buys a younger dog, whom he names "New Brian". New Brian's attitude makes Brian feel upset and decides to leave home and moves in to Quagmire’s. New Brian's friendly attitude begins to annoy Stewie, who asks Brian to return. Brian refuses, saying he will not come back if New Brian is there. Stewie tells New Brian he does not like him, and New Brian retaliates by revealing that he violated Rupert. Angered, Stewie terminates New Brian and forges a suicide note; the Griffins then take Brian back.
116	6	"Tales of a Third Grade Nothing"	Jerry Langford	Alex Carter	November 16, 2008	6ACX10	8.57
Peter tries to get a promotion by impressing his boss Angela, which leads to his inadvertently blowing up part of a children's hospital. After he is then told he needs to finish third grade to get the promotion, he returns to school. Peter resents being there, and only passes the grade after winning a spelling bee. When he returns to his job for the promotion, Angela informs him he is under arrest for blowing up the hospital.
117	7	"Ocean's Three and a Half"	John Holmquist	Cherry Chevapravatdumrong	February 15, 2009	6ACX11	7.41
Bonnie gives birth to her baby, a beautiful girl named Susie; however, Joe is unable to pay her medical bills. He turns to a loan shark for the money, and ends up in debt. Peter and his friends ask Carter for money to pay the debt, but Carter refuses. In a final act of desperation, Peter suggests that they rob Carter. However, when they reach Carter's vault Lois arrives and convinces Joe to stop. She talks Carter into providing the money, telling him she is using it for a divorce lawyer; when Peter asks her if she is joking, Lois says nothing (leaving Peter worried).
118	8	"Family Gay"	Brian Iles	Richard Appel	March 8, 2009	6ACX12	7.09
Peter participates in medical experiments to pay off a debt. One includes his being injected with the "gay gene". Peter then becomes involved in a gay relationship, leaving his family heartbroken. Seeing how unhappy Lois is, Brian and Stewie plan to take Peter to a camp to "turn him straight". When Lois finds out she stops them, since she believes Peter has the right to be happy with whomever he chooses. Later that night the gay gene's effect wears off, and Peter returns to his family.
119	9	"The Juice Is Loose"	Cyndi Tang	Andrew Goldberg	March 15, 2009	6ACX13	7.29
In this supposedly-lost episode from 2007 Peter cashes in a raffle ticket from 1989 and wins a golf outing with O. J. Simpson, unaware of Simpson's accusations of murder. He befriends Simpson, and takes him home to meet his family. Word soon spreads that Simpson is staying in Quahog, and the town's residents try to drive him out. Desperate for somewhere to live in peace, Simpson makes a heartfelt speech; he confesses that he is as imperfect as everyone else, and the residents of Quahog apologize. A moment later, however, Simpson pulls a knife, kills three people before running off and the mob resumes its chase.
120	10	"Fox-y Lady"	Pete Michels	Matt Fleckenstein	March 22, 2009	6ACX14	7.34
Lois gets a job at Fox News, although Brian warns her that the channel is a biased network. On her first day she is assigned to an exposé on Michael Moore alleging that he is homosexual. When she spies on him at home she sees Rush Limbaugh leaving, causing her to conclude that Limbaugh and Moore are in a relationship. However, Fox News refuses to allow any material unfavorable to a conservative to be broadcast (making Lois realize that Brian was right). Lois and Brian take the story into their own hands, confronting whom they think to be Moore and a naked Limbaugh in a bedroom only to realize they are both Fred Savage. Flabbergasted, Lois decides to report his story instead. At the end, Lois is revealed to no longer work as a reporter; she does not reveal how or why, since no one cares.
121	11	"Not All Dogs Go to Heaven"	Greg Colton	Danny Smith	March 29, 2009	6ACX17	8.12
Meg becomes a born-again Christian after watching a Christian TV show starring Kirk Cameron. She begins talking about Christianity to the Griffins, who are uninterested in her new-found faith. Meg asks Brian for help, but he confides that he is an atheist. She spreads the news of Brian's atheism around Quahog (which detests atheists), making him a social outcast; he is banned from every bar and convenience store in Quahog, making it impossible for him to drink. Brian fakes repentance (convincing Meg to cease hostilities against him so he can return to drinking), but she takes him to burn books which are "harmful to God". Disgusted, Brian comes clean and tries to convince Meg that what she is doing is wrong. When she refuses to listen Brian points out that if there were truly a loving God, he would not have created Meg in a family contemptuous of her. Ashamed, Meg concedes and apologizes for her behavior. Brian then assures her that the answers are inside herself, and the real meaning of existence is out there. It is later revealed that the Family Guy universe takes place within the molecules of a lampshade in the bedroom of Adam West and Rob Lowe (who appear wishing each other good night in a live action scene parodying Bert and Ernie from Sesame Street).
122	12	"420"	Julius Wu	Patrick Meighan	April 19, 2009	6ACX16	7.34
After Brian is arrested for drug possession, he launches a campaign to legalize marijuana in Quahog. After an elaborate musical, Mayor West passes a law legalizing the drug. Everyone starts smoking it; the town improves as a result, with a decrease in crime. However, Carter begins losing money in the timber industry (since hemp is being used to manufacture many products). He bribes Peter to help him with an anti-marijuana campaign, which ultimately fails. Carter then bribes Brian by promising to publish and ship his novel, Faster Than the Speed of Love. He reluctantly complies, and the drug becomes illegal once more. Brian's novel is released but is criticized and sells no copies.
123	13	"Stew-Roids"	Jerry Langford	Alec Sulkin	April 26, 2009	6ACX18	6.67
Susie attacks Stewie; upset by this, Peter takes Stewie to train at the local gym. A trainer notices Stewie struggling with barbells and offers them steroids. Peter injects the drugs into Stewie, who becomes well-developed. As time passes, Stewie's drugs gradually wear off; to his horror, his skin becomes loose and flabby. He jumps out his bedroom window to avoid Brian (whom he had previously annoyed), only to have his loosened skin help him glide to safety. At the end of the episode, his body inexplicably returns to normal.
124	14	"We Love You, Conrad"	John Holmquist	Cherry Chevapravatdumrong	May 3, 2009	6ACX19	6.57
Brian learns that his ex-girlfriend Jillian is getting married, and goes to a local bar to drown his sorrows. In a drunken stupor, he meets Lauren Conrad (although he does not realize this until they wake up in bed the next morning). Against Brian's wishes, Stewie leaks the relationship online; this results in a media circus and the claim that Lauren is a "dumb blonde". Attempting to break off the relationship, Brian realizes that Lauren is an accomplished woman. Brian becomes even more uncomfortable with the relationship, comparing himself to Lauren. Realizing that Brian never got over the end of his relationship with Jillian, Lauren encourages him to tell her know how he feels. Brian uses Jillian's wedding as an opportunity to interrupt the ceremony and passionately profess his love for her. Jillian replies that she has moved on, and he needs to do the same.
125	15	"Three Kings"	Dominic Bianchi	Alec Sulkin	May 10, 2009	6ACX15	6.36
Peter imagines his friends and family in three of Stephen King's best-known works: Stand by Me, Misery and The Shawshank Redemption.
126	16	"Peter's Progress"	Brian Iles	Wellesley Wild	May 17, 2009	6ACX20	7.35
Peter learns from Cleveland's Jamaican psychic cousin, Madame Claude, in a palm reading that in a past life he was Griffin Peterson (the founder of Quahog). We are shown a 17th-century England in which Griffin proposes to the love of his life, Lady Redbush. The ruthless King Stewart III, however, spots Redbush strolling through town and decides that he will marry her. When Griffin is en route to his wedding, Stewart exiles him to the New World. As Lady Redbush waits in growing anxiety, Stewart walks into the church; he tells her Griffin is dead, marrying her himself. Reaching the New World, Griffin establishes the colony of Quahog (which becomes a thriving settlement) and moves on with his life. King Stewart's jester soon reveals the truth to Redbush, who leaves for Quahog and reunites with Griffin. When the king learns Redbush is gone, he leaves for Quahog to reclaim her. When they are found, Griffin threatens to kill an officer and Stewart threatens to kill Redbush. After the exchange of threats, Griffin and Stewart decide to settle their dispute with a talent show. For his act, King Stewart steals his jester's (mostly unfunny) jokes. However, Griffin steals the show with a techno-rock number; he and Redbush live happily ever after in Quahog.

== Production ==
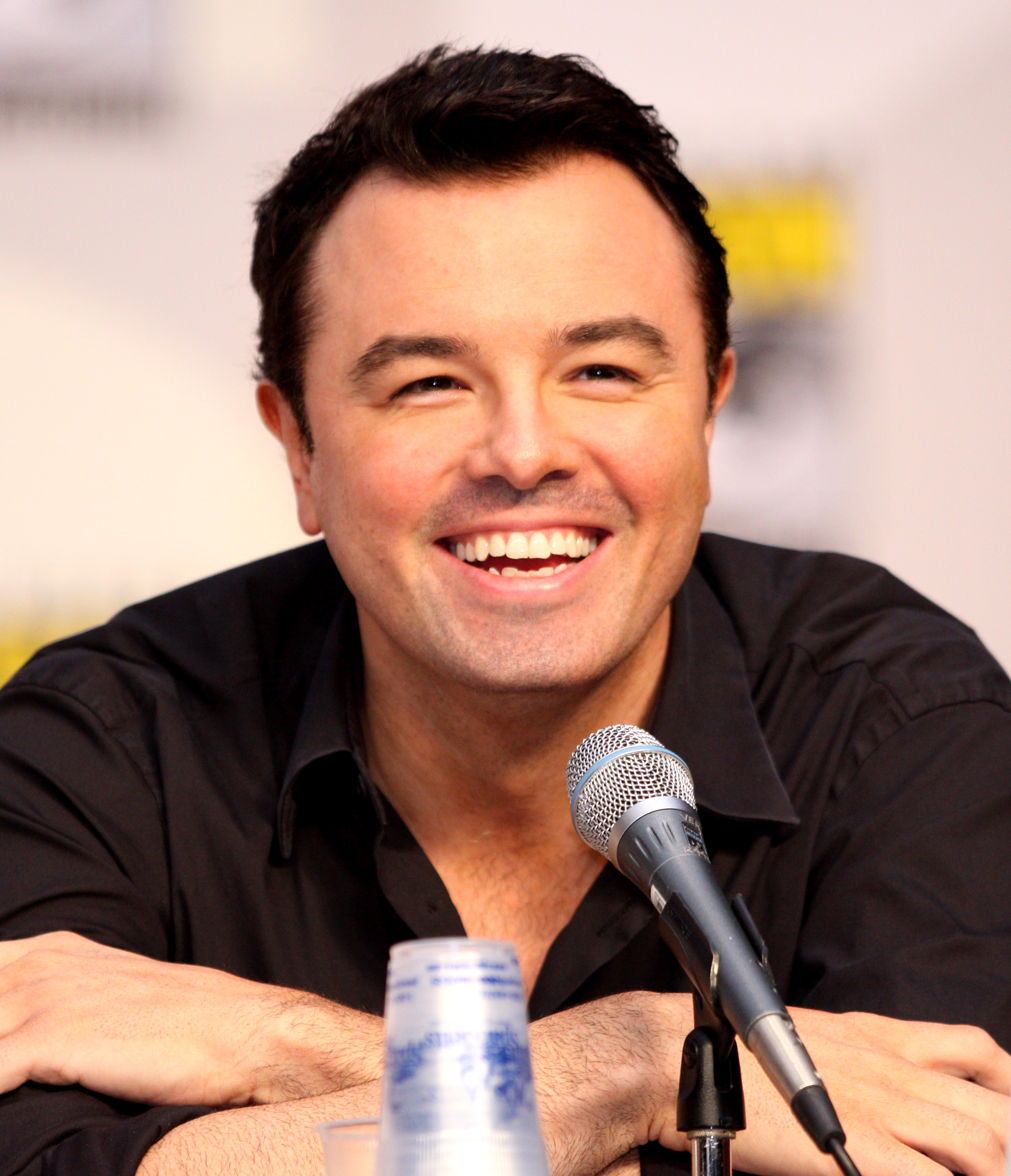
Seth MacFarlane sided with the Writers Guild on their strike.

The season premiered September 28, 2008 with the episode "Love, Blactually" airing on Fox Broadcasting Company in the United States. During the sixth season of the show, episodes of Family Guy and American Dad! were delayed from regular broadcast due to the 2007–2008 Writers Guild of America strike. Series creator and executive producer Seth MacFarlane sided with the Writers Guild and participated in the strike until its conclusion. Official production of Family Guy was halted for most of December 2007 and intermittent periods afterwards. Fox continued producing episodes without MacFarlane's final approval; although he refused to work on the show during the strike, his contract with Fox required him to contribute to any episodes it subsequently produced. Due to this, most sixth-season episodes had to be pushed back to this one; this left the sixth season with only twelve episodes, and the seventh season began with hold-overs from the previous one.

=== Crew work ===
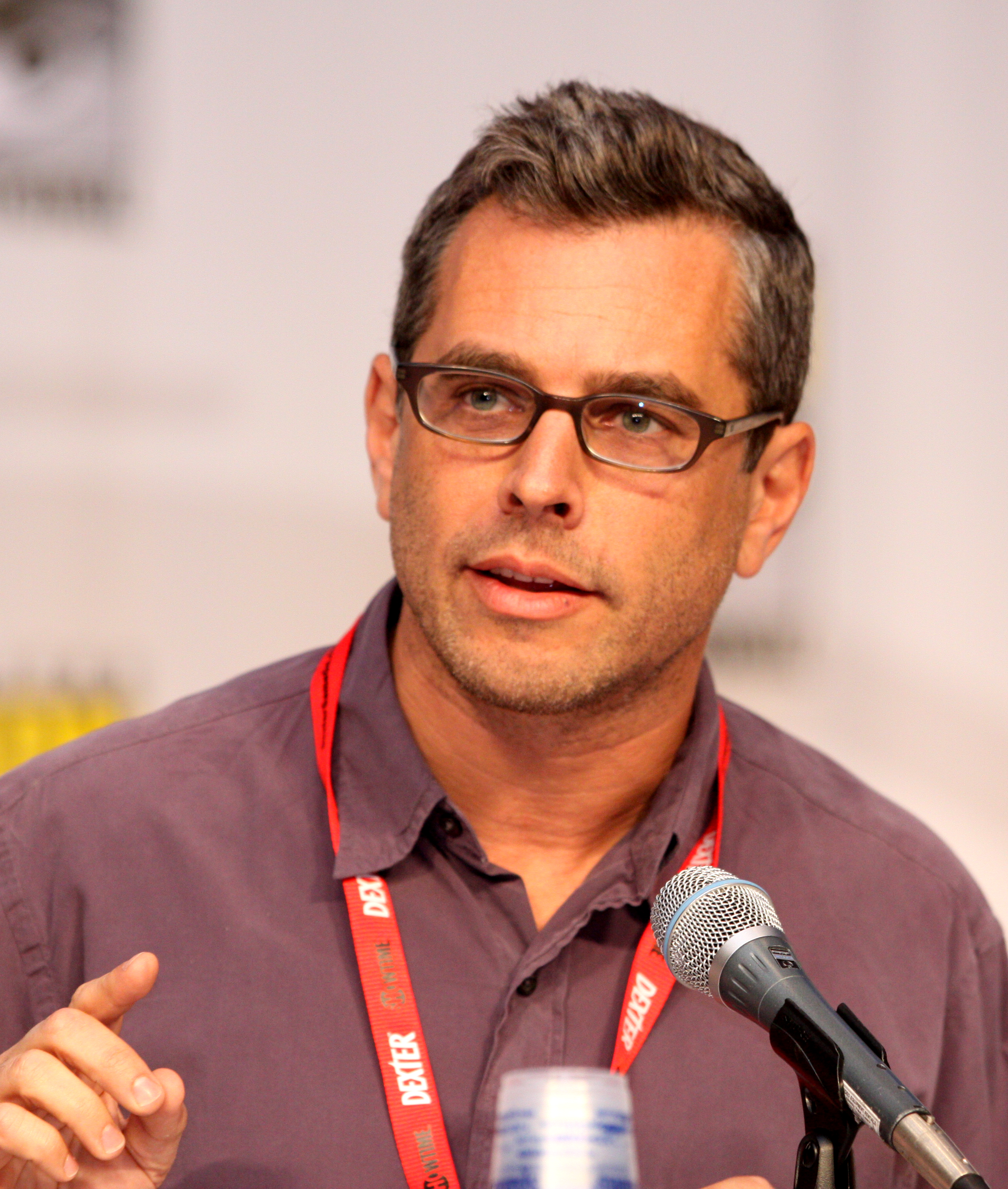
Richard Appel, executive producer and writer of "Family Guy"

MacFarlane, Danny Smith, David Goodman and Chris Sheridan were the executive producers for the season. Richard Appel, Steve Callaghan, Mark Hentemann and Brian Scully were co-executive producers. Other producers included Mike Henry, Patrick Meighan, Tom Devanney, Alec Sulkin, Wellesley Wild, John L. Jacobs, Kara Vallow, Kirker Butler, Shannon Smith, Cherry Chevapravatdumrong, Kim Fertman and Brandi Young.

The writing staff included John Viener, Andrew Goldberg, Matt Fleckenstein, Andrew Gormley, Alex Carter, executive producers Chris Sheridan, Danny Smith, co-executive producers Richard Appel, Mark Hentemann, Brian Scully, supervising producers Mike Henry, Alec Sulkin, Wellesley Wild and co-producers Cherry Chevapravatdumrong and Patrick Meighan. Each wrote one episode, except for Meighan, Sulkin and Chevapravatdumrong (who wrote two each). There were nine directors for the sixteen episodes of the season, with Cyndi Tang, Greg Colton, Julius Wu, Brian Iles, Jerry Langford and Dominic Bianchi directing two episodes each. Peter Shin and James Purdum were supervising directors for the entire season. Walter Murphey composed the season's music tracks, while Stan Jones edited them.

=== Casting ===
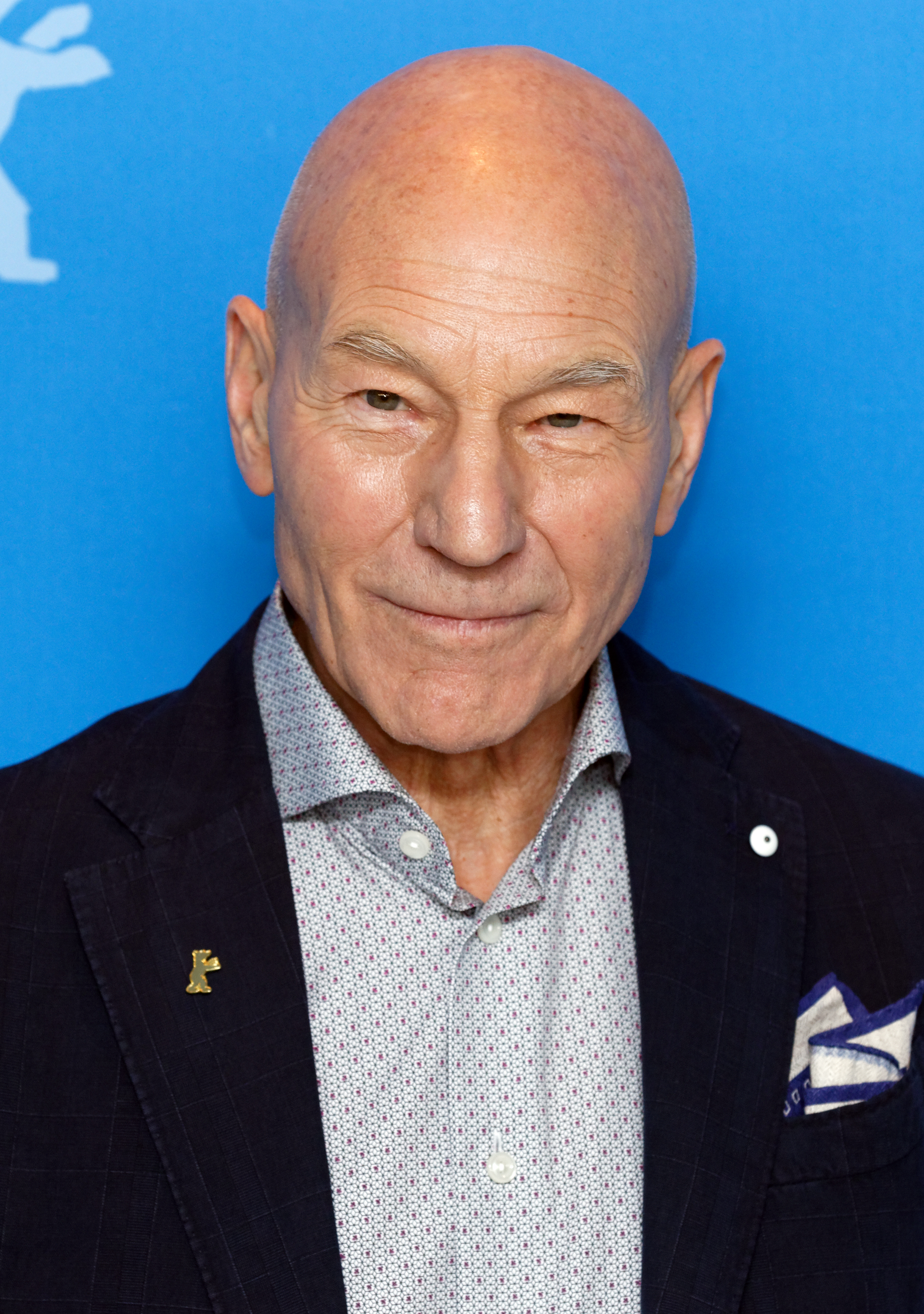
Patrick Stewart and the cast of Star Trek: The Next Generation guest-starred in "Not All Dogs Go to Heaven".

Season seven had a cast of five main actors. MacFarlane voiced Peter Griffin, a blue-collar worker and the patriarch of the Griffin family. The family's evil-genius baby Stewie, their anthropromorphic pet dog Brian, their sexually-active neighbor Glenn Quagmire, Peter's father-in-law Carter Pewterschmidt, local doctor Elmer Hartman and local news anchor Tom Tucker were also voiced by MacFarlane. Other members of the family include Peter's responsible-but-rebellious wife, Lois (voiced by Alex Borstein); their self-loathing teenage daughter, Meg (voiced by Mila Kunis) and their goofball teenage son, Chris (voiced by Seth Green). Mike Henry voiced the Griffins' neighbor (and Peter's friend) Cleveland Brown.

The season had a number of secondary characters, including Lori Alan as Diane Simmons (a local news anchor); Mike Henry as Cleveland Brown (a neighbor and friend of the Griffins); Patrick Warburton as Joe Swanson (a disabled neighbor) and Jennifer Tilly as Bonnie Swanson (Joe's pregnant wife). Adam West voices an alternative version of himself, Mayor Adam West. Other recurring characters include Phil LaMarr as Ollie Williams, Johnny Brennan as Mort Goldman, Carrie Fisher as Angela, Mark Hentemann as Opie, Borstein as Trisha Takanawa and Henry as Bruce. Staff members Danny Smith, Jon Viener and Alec Sulkin voiced several minor characters. The season introduced New Brian (voiced by Viener), a replacement for the older Brian and Susie, the Swansons' newborn daughter.

The season also included guest actors voicing themselves, including Frank Sinatra Jr., Seth Rogen, Lauren Conrad, Johnny Knoxville, Jay Leno, Craig Ferguson, Audrina Patridge, Sinbad, Patrick Stewart, LeVar Burton, Gates McFadden, Brent Spiner, Michael Dorn, Jonathan Frakes, Wil Wheaton, Denise Crosby and Rob Lowe.

== Reception ==
The seventh-season premiere was viewed by 9.2 million viewers, a significantly-higher number than those watching the sixth-season finale. In the weeks following "Love Blactually", viewership hovered around 8 million. "Baby Not On Board" was the most-viewed episode of the season, with 9.97 million views and a 5.0 Nielsen rating.

Ahsan Haque of IGN graded the seventh season of Family Guy 8.2 out of a possible 10, saying that it was a "very competent season" for the show. He praised the use of the show's hallmark pop-culture references and the writers' more story-driven episodes. Haque considered "Road to Germany" as the highlight of the season and regarded "The Juice is Loose" and "Baby Not On Board" as the poorest, citing them as examples of what the show could be when the writers "choose not to put in any effort". In 2009, IGN included the Star Trek: The Next Generation cast reunion in "Not All Dogs Go to Heaven" in its countdown of "Family Guy's Top 10 Star Trek Moments". Later that year, it included the "Raining Bitches" and the "Boom Goes The Dynamite" moments (both from "Love Blactually") in its "Family Guy's Top 10 Cleveland Moments". In 2010, IGN put "Road to Germany" on its list of "Stewie and Brian's Greatest Adventures".

Casey Burchby from DVD Talk gave a mixed review to Volume Seven of Family Guy; he noted that while a lot of the jokes are obvious and not funny in the show's context, there are standout episodes such as "I Dream of Jesus" and "Baby Not On Board". He also praised "Road to Germany", which "combines solid writing with some noteworthy design work". Another writer from DVD Talk, Francis Rizzo III, reviewed Volume Eight and praised "Three Kings" for blending humor with the original films and its story-based narrative. He also pointed out that episodes like "420", "Not All Dogs Go to Heaven" and "FOX-y Lady" contained scenes which were like nothing seen on television before.

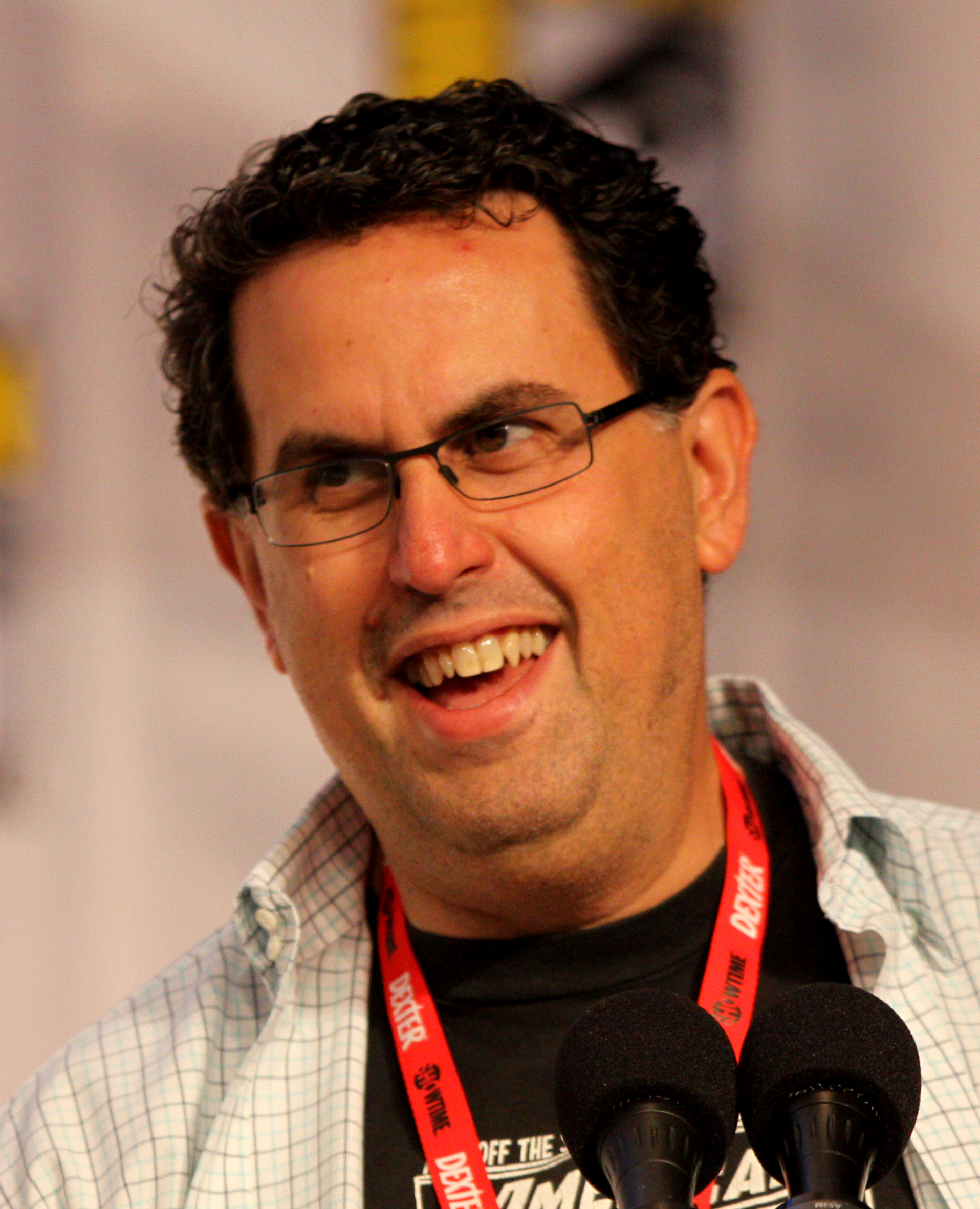
Executive producer David A. Goodman responded to criticism from the Parents Television Council.

The Parents Television Council (a frequent critic of Family Guy) branded "Family Gay", "Three Kings" "420", and "Stew-roids" as the "worst show of the week," a title frequently given the series by the group. In response to its group's criticism, executive producer David Goodman claimed that Family Guy is "absolutely for adults" and he does not allow his own children to watch the show. MacFarlane also responded to the PTC's decrees against the show in an interview with The Advocate: "For an organization that prides itself on Christian values — I mean, I’m an atheist, so what do I know? — they spend their entire day hating people."

Mixed assessments came from Robin Pierson of The TV Critic, giving the season an overall score of 49 out of 100. Pierson said that the show had become "predictable, stale and irritating to watch" and that it had become "just like the TV shows it mocked". He criticized some episodes for "insulting their viewers' intelligence" and for being "badly written", although he praised some of the stories for following a logical progression. Pierson considered "We Love You Conrad" as the best episode of the season (rating it 67 out of 100), and "Baby Not On Board" as the poorest (rating it 12).

The Venezuelan government reacted negatively to "420", and banned Family Guy from their local networks (which generally air syndicated American programming). Local station Televen was threatened with fines for broadcasting the show (which were avoided by airing an episode of Baywatch instead), and it aired public-service films as an apology. Venezuelan Justice Minister Tareck El Aissami stated that any cable stations which refuse to stop airing the series would be fined, and he claimed that the program promoted the use of cannabis.

=== Awards and nominations ===
The season was nominated for a Primetime Emmy Award for Outstanding Comedy Series. The last animated program to be nominated was The Flintstones in 1961. Seth MacFarlane was nominated for a Primetime Emmy Award for Outstanding Voice-Over Performance for his role as Peter Griffin in "I Dream of Jesus". MacFarlane was also nominated for an Annie Award for the same episode, but lost to Ahmed Best from Robot Chicken. "Road to Germany" was nominated for a Golden Reel Award for Best Sound Editing, but lost to the Star Wars: The Clone Wars episode "Lair of Grievous".

== Home media ==
The first nine episodes of the seventh season were released on DVD by 20th Century Fox in the United States and Canada on June 16, 2009, one month after the last episode was broadcast. The "Volume 7" DVD release features bonus material, including deleted scenes, animatics and commentary for each episode. The remaining seven episodes were released on "Volume 8" in the United States.
