= Tales of a Third Grade Nothing =

- Family Guy episode
- Episode no.: Season 7 Episode 6
- Directed by: Jerry Langford
- Written by: Alex Carter
- Production code: 6ACX10
- Original air date: November 16, 2008

Guest appearances
- Bob Barker as himself; James Burkholder as child; Max Burkholder as child; Chace Crawford as Omar; Elisha Cuthbert as New Bedford; Kaylee DeFer as Dakota; Andy Dick as himself; Carrie Fisher as Angela; Caitlyn Jenner (then Bruce) (Note: Jenner changed her name due to sex transition in 2015.) as herself; Phil LaMarr; Debbie Reynolds as Mrs. Wilson; Frank Sinatra Jr. as himself; Sinbad as himself; Billy Unger as child; Mae Whitman

Episode chronology
← Previous "The Man with Two Brians"	Next → "Ocean's Three and a Half"
- Family Guy season 7

"Tales of a Third Grade Nothing" is the sixth episode and mid-season finale in the seventh season of American animated television series Family Guy. It originally aired on Fox in the United States on November 16, 2008. The episode follows Peter (voiced by show creator Seth MacFarlane) as he goes back to school to finish the third grade in order to get a promotion at work. It also follows Brian (also voiced by MacFarlane) and Frank Sinatra Jr. (voiced by himself) as they buy a club and give it to Stewie (MacFarlane) so that he can remodel it.

The episode was written by Alex Carter and directed by Jerry Langford, their firsts for the Family Guy series. Besides Sinatra, the episode featured guest performances by Bob Barker, James Burkholder, Max Burkholder, Chace Crawford, Elisha Cuthbert, Kaylee DeFer, Andy Dick, Carrie Fisher, Caitlyn Jenner (then Bruce), Phil LaMarr, Debbie Reynolds, Sinbad, Billy Unger and Mae Whitman, along with several recurring guest voice actors for the series. The episode was seen by 8.52 million viewers, and received mostly positive reviews from television critics.

== Plot ==
Peter is sent upstairs by his boss to deliver shipping reports to the CEO. On his way to deliver the reports, he decides to go into the executive bathroom. When he discovers how lavish the bathroom is, he becomes motivated to do well at work so that he can become an executive and use the executive bathroom. But while trying to impress his boss Angela by blowing up a competitor's billboard, he inadvertently blows up part of a children's hospital. Nevertheless, she is impressed by his improvement at work and recommends an open executive spot for him. However, Human Resources tells him he must first complete the third grade in order to qualify.

Peter does badly at school and offends his teacher Mrs. Wilson by telling an inappropriate story about her (forgetting that Mrs. Wilson was also Peter's teacher when he was a third grader), and makes fun of top student Omar. Mrs. Wilson allows Peter to attend the spelling bee after spelling out "buttlickers" which even Omar can't spell; she tells him that he will pass third grade if he succeeds. Omar fails the spelling bee because he misspelled "coagulate", but Peter succeeds after correctly spelling "lesbians". When Peter returns to work, however, Angela tells him that instead of being promoted, he will go to jail for the hospital explosion. Fortunately for him, he receives only one week in prison and is told he will be released the following Sunday night at 9:00 (Family Guy's usual time slot).

Meanwhile, Frank Sinatra Jr. comes back to town to perform with Brian at the Quahog Cabana Club. Since the club owner is looking to sell, Brian and Frank buy the establishment and they let Stewie transform it into a hip, modern nightclub called pLace. At first, Frank and Brian feel uncomfortable, but their feelings change once they get into the club life themselves. However, the club swiftly loses its popularity once Andy Dick bursts in, causing all the partygoers to flee. Once the club has emptied, Frank and Brian perform another song.

== Production ==
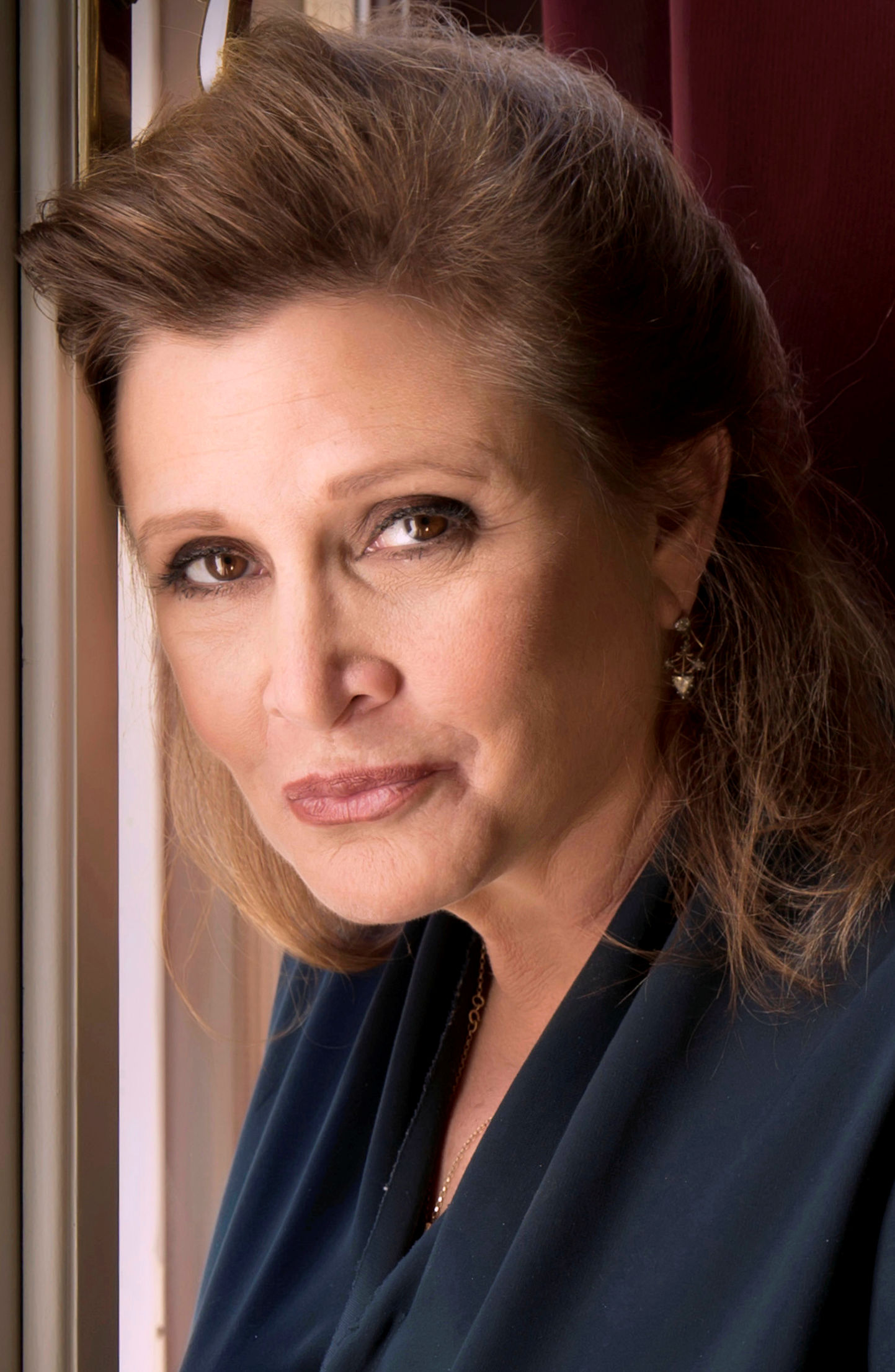
Carrie Fisher returned as Peter's boss, Angela

"Tales of a Third Grade Nothing" was written by newcomer Alex Carter. It was directed by former Mission Hill and The Oblongs director Jerry Langford, who had joined the show's directing staff that season making this his first Family Guy episode, he would direct the episode "Stew-Roids" later that season. Series regulars Peter Shin and James Purdum served as supervising directors. Composer Walter Murphy, who has worked on the series since its inception, returned to compose the music for "Tales of a Third Grade Nothing".

Actress Carrie Fisher, who was most famous for her role as Princess Leia in Star Wars, returned to voice Peter's boss, Angela, as she first did in the fourth season episode "Jungle Love". Fisher was given high praise for her portrayal of the character, with The Hollywood Reporter calling it one of her "5 Most Iconic Roles." Singer Frank Sinatra Jr. also returned to voice himself, as he did in another fourth season episode "Brian Sings and Swings".

In addition to Fisher, Sinatra and the regular cast, former game show host Bob Barker, actor James Burkholder, actor Max Burkholder, actor Chace Crawford, actress Elisha Cuthbert, actress Kaylee DeFer, comedian Andy Dick, athlete Caitlyn Jenner (then Bruce), voice actor Phil LaMarr, actress Debbie Reynolds, who was Fisher's mother, actor Sinbad, child actor Billy Unger, and voice actress Mae Whitman guest starred in the episode. Recurring voice actors Lori Alan, Alexandra Breckenridge, writer Steve Callaghan, Ralph Garman, writer Danny Smith, writer Alec Sulkin, writer John Viener, and writer Wellesley Wild made minor appearances.

== Cultural references ==
"Tales of a Third Grade Nothing" makes several media references. The name of the episode itself is a reference to Judy Blume's children's book Tales of a Fourth Grade Nothing, whose narrator-protagonist is likewise named Peter. The first few minutes feature a parody of the film Jurassic Park where Peter enters the executive bathroom and inside there is a helicopter that takes Peter to an island; John Hammond, who is inside the helicopter, welcomes Peter, and the music playing while the helicopter flies above the island is that which was used in the movie. Peter using the restroom and commenting on how peaceful everything is also a reference to a far different scene in the movie when a lawyer was eaten by a Tyrannosaurus rex after attempting to hide in a bathroom stall. Yosemite Sam (voiced by Seth MacFarlane), one of the classic Looney Tunes characters, is seen trying on skinny jeans in Barney's. The Emperor from the Star Wars movies requests that the song "On the Dark Side" by John Cafferty & The Beaver Brown Band be played at Brian and Frank's club. A video of John Madden analyzing a wedding video like a football play is shown.

Stewie references singer Michael Jackson and how his dance styles appeared to be violent to his own genitalia. Stewie claims that whenever Andy Dick (who voiced himself) shows up at a club, he gets a worse reputation than John Wilkes Booth; the episode cuts to Booth at Ford's Theater while being annoyed by an obnoxious Abraham Lincoln. A cutaway gag featuring Stewie as a grape stomper references a news reporter who was doing the same thing, fell, got her wind knocked out and reacted hysterically. Near the end of the episode, Frank and Brian perform a duet of a song called "Take Me Out to pLace Tonight," which uses Billy May's orchestral arrangement of "On the Road to Mandalay," as featured on Frank Sinatra Sr.'s 1958 album, Come Fly with Me.

== Reception ==
In its original broadcast in the United States on November 16, 2008, "Tales of a Third Grade Nothing" was watched by 8.52 million homes and acquired a 4.2 Nielsen rating, the audience measurement systems developed to determine the audience size and composition of television programming in the United States.

The episode received positive reviews. Ahsan Haque of IGN praised "Tales of a Third Grade Nothing", writing that it had "a convoluted storyline that actually has some kind of logical flow, and more than a fair share of genuinely funny and outrageously offensive jokes.". He graded the episode 8.5 out of 10. Steve Heisler of The A.V. Club wrote that the episode was an above average episode, and graded it B. In contrast, Robin Pierson of The TV Critic gave the episode a negative review, saying that while it was funnier than the usual episodes of the show it was still "plotless ramblings".
