= Stew-Roids =

- Family Guy episode
- Episode no.: Season 7 Episode 13
- Directed by: Jerry Langford
- Written by: Alec Sulkin
- Production code: 6ACX18
- Original air date: April 26, 2009

Guest appearances
- Meredith Baxter-Birney as Elyse Keaton; Jeff Bergman as Fred Flintstone; Gary Cole as Principal Shephard; Chace Crawford as Student #1; Camille Guaty as Gina; Wentworth Miller as Student #2; Mae Whitman as Student #3; Lisa Wilhoit as Connie D'Amico

Episode chronology
← Previous "420"	Next → "We Love You, Conrad"
- Family Guy season 7

"Stew-Roids" is the 13th episode in the seventh season of the American animated television series Family Guy. It originally aired on the Fox network in the United States on April 26, 2009. The episode features Stewie after he is attacked at an outdoor party by Joe's infant daughter, Susie. While training Stewie, Peter injects him with performance-enhancing drugs, and Stewie becomes incredibly muscular. Meanwhile, Chris becomes the fake boyfriend of popular student Connie D'Amico. He begins to like her, and the two begin a serious relationship, leading him to become popular. His newfound popularity goes to his head, however, causing him to become mean and self-centered towards everyone around him.

The episode was written by Alec Sulkin and directed by Jerry Langford. It received mixed reviews from critics for its storyline and many cultural references, in addition to receiving criticism from the Parents Television Council. According to Nielsen ratings, it was viewed by 6.80 million viewers on its original airdate. The episode featured guest performances by Wilhoit, Meredith Baxter-Birney, Jeff Bergman, Gary Cole, Chace Crawford, Camille Guaty, Wentworth Miller and Mae Whitman along with several recurring guest voice actors for the series.

== Plot ==
Joe and Bonnie host a backyard barbecue, where Joe's baby daughter, Susie, gets into a fight with Stewie over a doll and attacks him. Upset by this, Peter takes Stewie to train at the local gymnasium. A trainer notices Stewie struggling with barbells and offers steroids. Peter injects the drugs into Stewie, who becomes incredibly buff and develops an aggressive personality, much to the horror of his family. Stewie becomes tormenting towards Brian. As time passes, Stewie's drugs gradually wear off, much to his shock. His skin becomes incredibly loose and flabby. Stewie jumps out of his bedroom window to avoid Brian's wrath, only to have his loosened skin help him glide to safety.

Elsewhere, Connie D'Amico is unhappy to learn that she has dated nearly every single boy in the school and plans to date an unpopular boy to gain better popularity, eventually deciding on Chris. During their first date, Chris reveals that he likes Connie, who is surprised by his kind heart and actually becomes attracted to him. As a result, Chris's popularity increases at school, which leads to accolades by the jocks, cheerleaders, and other socially powerful students. Meg tries to use the relationship to gain popularity herself, only to find herself snubbed off by Chris's newfound shallowness. That weekend night, Chris and Connie plan a house party at the Griffins’ house, but Connie becomes upset when she finds out that Chris is cheating on her with two other girls, making Connie a social outcast. She turns to a reluctant Meg, who eventually relents when a javelin thrown by Chris impales Meg's shoulder. They publicly release a video of Chris dancing naked in his room in the style of Buffalo Bill from The Silence of the Lambs. Connie instantly becomes popular again, while Chris is rendered back to his low social standing and apologizes to Meg for everything, and he tells her what it was like to be a part of the "in-crowd".

== Production ==
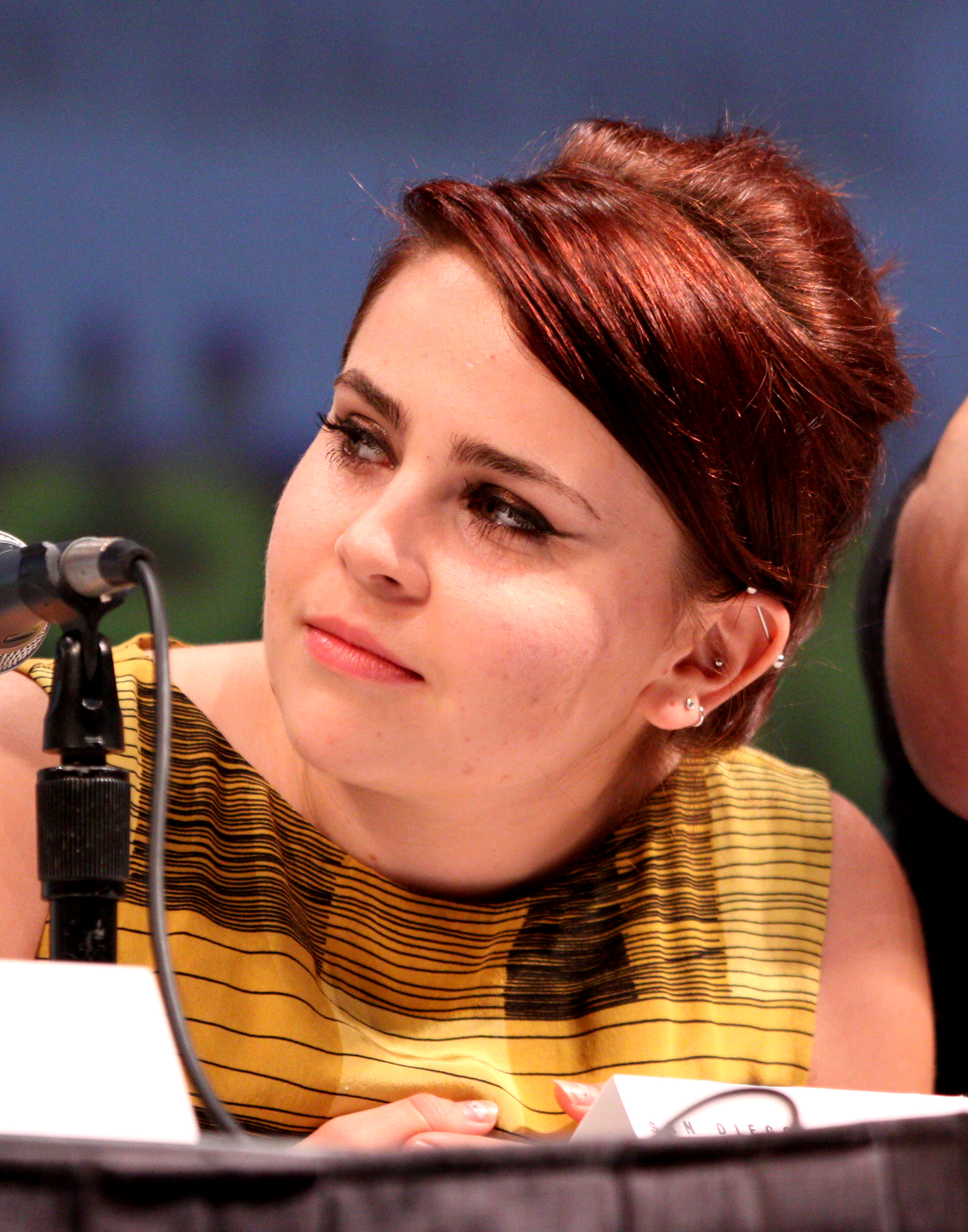
Mae Whitman guest starred in the episode.

"Stew-Roids" was written by series regular Alec Sulkin in his first writing job for the season. It was directed by former Mission Hill and The Oblongs director Jerry Langford, who had joined the show's staff that season when he directed the episode "Tales of a Third Grade Nothing". Series regulars Peter Shin and James Purdum served as supervising directors.

The role of Kevin Swanson has been portrayed by several people, including actor Jon Cryer in the second season episode "There's Something About Paulie"; the character was revealed in this episode to have died in the Iraq War. This would later be retconned in the tenth season episode "Thanksgiving", in which Kevin, now voiced by actor Scott Grimes, is revealed to have faked his death to escape Iraq.

In addition to the regular cast, actors Meredith Baxter-Birney, Jeff Bergman, Gary Cole, Chace Crawford, Camille Guaty, Wentworth Miller, Mae Whitman and Lisa Wilhoit guest starred in the episode. The episode featured many of the show's recurring guest voice actors including: Alexandra Breckenridge, Chris Cox, Ralph Garman, and writers Danny Smith, Alec Sulkin, and John Viener also made minor appearances. Recurring voice actors Jennifer Tilly and Patrick Warburton reprise their roles of Bonnie and Joe Swanson respectively.

== Cultural references ==
The episode includes various cultural references, including Johnson & Johnson's "No more tears" slogan. Peter is seen watching Spike TV. Stewie enters a fight with Susie over a Barbie doll. Stewie composes a song about his toned body, pronouncing the word body as "bah-dy" a reference to the pronunciation of the word in John Mayer's "Your Body Is a Wonderland". Chris' nude dance is a reference to a similar scene in The Silence Of The Lambs; this is in itself an in-joke as Chris Griffin's voice was initially Seth Green's impression of Buffalo Bill. Brian compares Stewie's muscular body to actor Lou Ferrigno's feces. Lois and Brian sit on the couch while they watch Lady and the Tramp and Michael Vick. Adam Sandler's movie career is referenced. Connie's best friend Gina says that Chris smells like Fred Flintstone's behind. Folkloric figure Santa Claus is seen getting a DUI.

Chris says he hates classic rock stations because they always end up playing “We Built This City” from Starship. The radio station Chris tunes in to is "Classic Rock 103.7 WHTT". WHTT was the callsign for the current Boston, MA radio station WODS, a classic hits station at the time that played the same music the fictional WHTT apparently airs before flipping to Top 40 in 2012 as 103.3 Amp Radio. The station had the callsign from 1983 to 1986. This further references Boston influences on the TV show. Another station actually holds the callsigns now, 104.1 WHTT-FM in Buffalo, NY, with the same format. After Stewie is injected with steroids, he lifts a barbell on one side and says "I have the power!" and the show then shifts scenes the same as in Masters of the Universe. It is mentioned that Connie is the key to One-Eyed Willy's gold, a reference to The Goonies. Paul Sorvino and Chazz Palminteri are seen acting in a fictional movie called "Distracting Trumpet". After Stewie's steroids injection wears off and he jumps out the bedroom window, the music playing is from the cartoon series The Rocky and Bullwinkle Show.

== Reception ==
In a slight drop from the previous week, "Stew-Roids" was viewed in 6.80 million homes in its original airing. It also received a 4.0/6 in Nielsen ratings, the audience measurement systems developed to determine the audience size and composition of television programming in the United States.

Ahsan Haque of IGN gave the episode a score of 8.2 out of 10, commending Chris' storyline and praising Stewie's temporary build, but criticizing the staleness of Meg's continued poor treatment. Steve Heisler of The A.V. Club gave a much more critical review giving the episode a grade of a C. Heisler stated that neither of the storylines "held any water", because they were "ridiculously short". He also commented: "I'm starting to wonder if this show is even watchable anymore – 18 minutes of filler, 45 seconds of inspired silliness."

The Parents Television Council, a frequent critic of Family Guy, named "Stew-Roids" its "Worst TV Show of the Week" for the week ending August 28, 2009; the review was based on a repeat airing. The PTC's review cited the episode's crude jokes, "tiresome pop culture cutaways" and "its conceit that its content is original." The latter referred to the plotline about Chris' sudden popularity at school and having a swelled ego as a result.

"Stew-Roids", along with the seven other episodes from Family Guy's eighth season and seven from the seventh season, were released on a three-disc DVD set in the United States on June 15, 2010. The sets included brief audio commentaries by Seth MacFarlane and various crew and cast members for several episodes, a collection of deleted scenes, a special mini-feature which discussed the process behind animating "Road to the Multiverse", and mini-feature entitled "Family Guy Karaoke".
