= Road to the Multiverse =

- Family Guy episode
- From left to right: Brian, Peter, Stewie and Quagmire as a bird in the Disney universe sequence.
- Episode no.: Season 8 Episode 1
- Directed by: Greg Colton
- Written by: Wellesley Wild
- Production code: 7ACX06
- Original air date: September 27, 2009

Guest appearances
- Kei Ogawa as Japanese Lois and Japanese Meg; Kotaro Watanabe as Japanese Brian and Japanese Quagmire; Jamison Yang as Japanese Chris, Japanese Stewie and Japanese Peter

Episode chronology
← Previous "Peter's Progress"	Next → "Family Goy"
- Family Guy season 8

"Road to the Multiverse" is the first episode of the eighth season of the animated comedy series Family Guy. Directed by Greg Colton and written by Wellesley Wild, the episode originally aired on Fox in the United States on September 27, 2009, along with the series premiere of The Cleveland Show. In "Road to the Multiverse", two of the show's main characters, baby genius Stewie and anthropomorphic dog Brian, both voiced by series creator Seth MacFarlane, use an "out-of-this-world" remote control to travel through a series of parallel universes. They eventually end up in a world where dogs rule and humans obey. Brian becomes reluctant to return to his own universe, and he ultimately ends up breaking the remote, much to the dismay of Stewie, who soon seeks a replacement. The "Road to" episodes which have aired throughout various seasons of Family Guy were inspired by the Road to ... comedy films starring Bing Crosby, Bob Hope and Dorothy Lamour, though this episode was not originally conceived as a "Road to" show.

During the sixth season, episodes of Family Guy were delayed from regular broadcast due to the 2007–08 Writers Guild of America strike. MacFarlane, the series creator and executive producer, sided with the Writers Guild and participated in the strike until its conclusion. As a result, the seventh season consisted entirely of hold-overs. "Road to the Multiverse" was the first episode to be produced and aired after the strike ended. It was first announced at the 2008 San Diego Comic-Con.

Responses to the episode were highly positive; critics praised its storyline, numerous cultural references, and use of various animation styles. According to Nielsen ratings, it was watched by 10.17 million people during its original airing in the United States. The episode featured guest performances by Kei Ogawa, Kotaro Watanabe and Jamison Yang, along with several recurring guest voice actors for the series. Greg Colton won a Primetime Emmy Award for Individual Achievement in Animation, for storyboarding the episode, at the 62nd Primetime Emmy Awards. "Road to the Multiverse" was released on DVD along with seven other episodes from the season on June 15, 2010.

== Plot ==
As the Griffin family attend the county fair, Stewie announces that he has bred a winning pedigree pig for the local Quahog Clam Day. Revealing to Brian that he got the pig from a farm in a parallel universe, he shows him a remote control that teleports others across parallel universes. Each universe depicts Quahog in the same time and place but under different conditions. Deciding to test the device, they both visit a universe where Christianity never existed, so the Dark Ages never occurred and thus humanity is 1000 years more technologically advanced (despite the existence of the Sistine Chapel in that universe, albeit done by John Hinckley Jr. instead of Michelangelo). This leads a fascinated Brian to ask whether the remote can take them to other alternative realities. Stewie guides them both through several more parallel universes, about half of which have their own portrayals of the Griffin family. As time passes, Brian loses interest in the adventure and eventually comes to realize that Stewie has no idea how to return home.

Continuing their efforts, they reach a universe where humans are subservient to dogs. Stewie finally figures out how to modify the remote device so that they can return home; but Brian, overwhelmed by the thought of a world run by dogs like himself, is reluctant to leave and takes the remote. Stewie and Brian fight over the device, ultimately breaking it, which traps them in the alternative universe. In desperation, the two go to the universe's version of the Griffin family – who are all dogs except for their pet Brian, who is human – hoping to find a way home. The dog version of Stewie quickly confronts the human Stewie, revealing that he has also developed a universe-traveling device that would allow them to return to their own universe. Before Dog Stewie can fetch him his remote control, Human Stewie bites the dog version of his father, Peter, out of anger for being treated like an animal and is sent to the pound by dog Joe where he is to be euthanized later that day. The two Brians and Dog Stewie go to the human pound to free him, and both Stewie and Brian are sent back to their original universe. As they are being transported, human Brian, dreaming of a better life in a world of intelligent humans, leaps into the inter-universe portal at the last moment and successfully makes it to the original universe with the other two. Excited about his new prospects in life, human Brian begins his travels in a brand new universe but is abruptly struck by a car.

== Production and development ==
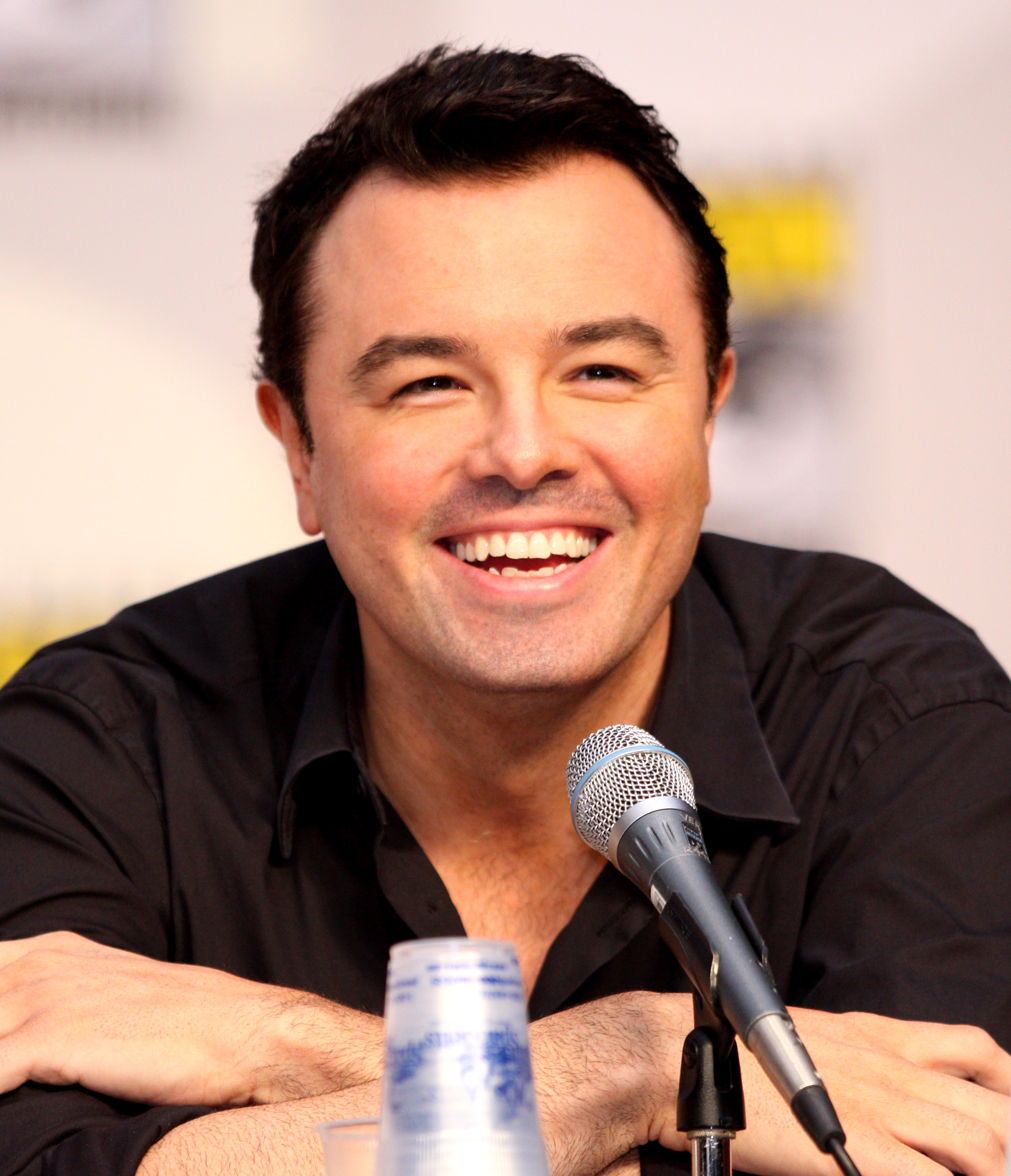
Seth MacFarlane agreed to let the episode become a "Road to" episode, after being approached by Colton.

The episode was first announced at the 2008 San Diego Comic-Con in San Diego, California, on July 26, 2008. It was written by series regular Wellesley Wild and directed by Greg Colton shortly after the conclusion of the seventh production season, which consisted entirely of held-over episodes due to the 2007–2008 Writers Guild of America strike. "Road to the Multiverse" is the fifth episode of the "Road to" hallmarks of the series, which have aired in various seasons of the show, and the second to be directed by Colton. The episodes are a parody of the seven Road to... comedy films starring Bing Crosby, Bob Hope and Dorothy Lamour. Though it was not originally intended to be a "Road to" episode, Greg Colton convinced series creator and executive producer Seth MacFarlane and "Spies Reminiscent of Us" director Cyndi Tang to change the episode's title from "Sliders", parodying the science fiction television series Sliders. Colton's suggestion of the new title "Road to the Multiverse" was accepted, as was altering the premise of "Spies Reminiscent of Us", the season's original "Road to" episode. Executive producer and former Star Trek: Enterprise writer David A. Goodman, a fan of science fiction and the series Sliders, played a key role in the episode's original development. The production staff of Family Guy, including Wellesley Wild, watched an episode of Sliders before writing the show. Series regulars Peter Shin and James Purdum served as supervising directors, with Andrew Goldberg and Alex Carter working as staff writers for the episode. Composer Walter Murphy, who has worked on the series since its inception, returned to compose the music for "Road to the Multiverse". Ron Jones and MacFarlane also contributed to the music and lyrics featured in the episode.

The episode features several examples of animation styles that differ greatly from the series' customary appearance. One such example involves the Disney universe, where the characters are drawn in the style of classic Walt Disney animated films. The sequence was animated entirely in Los Angeles by Main Street Productions, which were approached and recruited by series producer Kara Vallow to create the sequence. MacFarlane described the scene as "a bit of challenge" and "kind of an experiment" since every character had to be completely redesigned based on the style of such films as "Pinocchio, Beauty and the Beast and Snow White and the Seven Dwarfs." Another difference occurs in the dog universe, where the human characters are redrawn as dogs and Brian is redrawn as a human. MacFarlane found redesigning Brian easiest, simply giving him "a big nose and a collar." In addition to traditional animation, the episode included a parody by Sarah E. Meyer, Eileen Kohlhepp, Kelly Mazurowskiof of Robot Chicken, a stop motion series created by Family Guy cast member Seth Green for the Cartoon Network animation block Adult Swim. Green did not take part in the making of the parody; it was instead animated by the Los Angeles company Screen Novelties, which had worked on the early seasons of Robot Chicken.

"Road to the Multiverse", along with the seven other episodes from Family Guy's eighth season, was released on a three-disc DVD set in the United States on June 15, 2010. The DVDs included brief audio commentaries by Seth MacFarlane, various crew and cast members from several episodes, a collection of deleted scenes, a special mini-feature that discussed the process behind animating "Road to the Multiverse" and a mini-feature entitled Family Guy Karaoke. The set also includes a reprint of the script for the episode.

In addition to the regular cast, Japanese actors Kei Ogawa, Kotaro Watanabe and Jamison Yang guest starred in the episode as Japanese-inspired versions of the Griffin family and Glenn Quagmire. Recurring guest voice actor John G. Brennan reprised his recurring role as Mort Goldman and Adam West reprised his role as Mayor Adam West, who appears as an anthropomorphic mouse in the Disney universe. Minor appearances were made by writer and showrunner Steve Callaghan, actor Ralph Garman, writer and showrunner Mark Hentemann and writers Patrick Meighan, Danny Smith, Alec Sulkin and John Viener.

== Cultural references ==
The episode opens with Stewie revealing his ability to travel across parallel universes to Brian. The first universe that they decide to visit, after having questioned the origin of Stewie's pedigree pig, is said to exist in a world where Christianity is absent. In this universe, everything is seemingly years in advance of the 21st century; Quagmire is able to take a single pill and be instantly cured of the AIDS virus, and flying cars and buildings surround them. As the two travel through the universe, they come upon Stewie's older sister Meg, who has become significantly more attractive. While they watch her walk down the street, the 1984 single "Drop Dead Legs" by Van Halen plays. Playing on the nonexistence of Christianity, Brian and Stewie visit the Sistine Chapel and discover that a large collection of photos of American actress Jodie Foster has been substituted for The Creation of Adam painting by Michelangelo, who never painted the Sistine Chapel in this universe with no Christianity to inspire him, with the job instead being done by John Hinckley Jr.

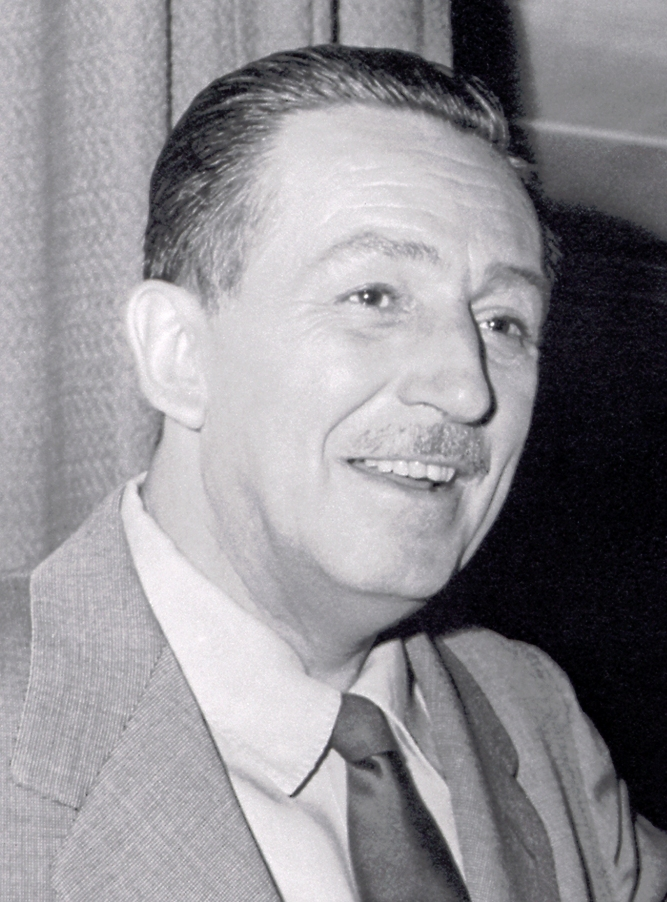
Walt Disney's works were prominently referenced in the Family Guy universe.

Seeking to explore more alternative realities, Stewie takes Brian to a universe resembling the Hanna-Barbera animated sitcom The Flintstones. Peter and his wife Lois are shown dressed in a manner similar to Fred Flintstone and Wilma Flintstone respectively. Becoming tired of this universe, the two then transport themselves to a universe where the atomic bombing of Japan never occurred, allowing Japan to conquer the United States in World War II.

Another universe references many works by Walt Disney Animation Studios. Meg appears as Ursula from the 1989 film The Little Mermaid and Herbert appears as the Queen from the 1937 film Snow White and the Seven Dwarfs. Walt Disney's alleged antisemitism is also referenced by having the universe's occupants attack the Disney version of Mort Goldman when he enters a room, brutally beating him to death off-screen. Discouraged, Brian and Stewie transport themselves to a universe resembling the Adult Swim series Robot Chicken, a show co-created by Family Guy cast member Seth Green. The sequence reveals several action figures of cartoon characters from the 1980s: He-Man from Masters of the Universe, Optimus Prime from Transformers, Lion-O from ThunderCats and Duke from G.I. Joe.

Continuing their travels, the two come across a universe where singer and performer Frank Sinatra was never born, resulting in the loss of the 1960 presidential election by President John F. Kennedy to then-Vice President Richard Nixon, which causes World War III. Brian questions whether Lee Harvey Oswald shot Kennedy, and Stewie responds that he shot Mayor McCheese instead. A sequence similar to the Zapruder film, which shows the assassination of Kennedy, is shown, with Jacqueline Kennedy also appearing. Brian and Stewie next discover a universe completely depicted as a political cartoon. The next reference occurs in the dog universe when Stewie says, "Take your stinking paws off me you damn, dirty dog!" which is a reference to the famous quote "Take your stinking paws off me you damn, dirty ape!" from the first Planet of the Apes movie. The final reference of the episode also occurs in the dog universe when Stewie mentions, "Gosh, Brian, I sure hope this next leap, will be the leap home," a nod to the opening narration of the time travel series Quantum Leap.

== Reception ==
" 'Nothing gold can stay', as poet Robert Frost wrote. That pretty much sums up how I feel about what Family Guy was, and what it has become recently. There was a time when it was one of the funniest shows on TV; it was comedy gold. But somewhere along the line, the show's shine faded, its image was tarnished, and the magic disappeared.

"That's not to say that Family Guy has not been good at all lately. Season eight certainly had a few good episodes including the season opener, "Road to the Multiverse", which had a clever premise that was executed well."

— Ramsey Isler, IGN.

"Road to the Multiverse" was broadcast on September 27, 2009, as a part of the Animation Domination block on Fox, and was preceded by an episode of The Simpsons and the pilot episode of MacFarlane's new show The Cleveland Show. It was followed by the season premiere of MacFarlane's other show American Dad!. It was watched by 10.17 million viewers in its original airing, according to Nielsen ratings, despite being aired simultaneously with the season premiere of Desperate Housewives on ABC, the season premiere of The Amazing Race on CBS and Sunday Night Football on NBC. The episode also acquired a 5.2 rating in the 18–49 demographic, beating The Simpsons, The Cleveland Show and American Dad!, in addition to edging out all three shows in total viewership. The episode's ratings were Family Guy's highest since the airing of the season six episode "McStroke". The episode's first broadcast in Canada, on Global TV, was watched by 1.29 million viewers, making it first for its timeslot in the week it was broadcast.

"Road to the Multiverse" received critical acclaim, with one calling the storyline "right up there with the best of the early episodes we've seen on the series." In a simultaneous review of the episodes of The Simpsons and American Dad! that preceded and followed the episode respectively and The Cleveland Show pilot, The A.V. Club's Emily VanDerWerff commented that she felt "essentially predisposed to like" the episode, adding that she enjoyed the entire theme of the show, in addition the fact that it was more than just science fiction. In the conclusion of her review VanDerWerff called the episode a "solid start to the eighth season" and rated it as a B+, the best rating between The Simpsons episode "Homer the Whopper", the American Dad! episode "In Country...Club" and The Cleveland Show's series premiere. Ahsan Haque of IGN gave the episode a 9.6 out of 10, saying that the episode featured "plenty of memorable lines, some truly stunning animation ... and a relentless non-stop barrage of witty jokes." In a subsequent review in January 2010 of "Stewie and Brian's Greatest Adventures", Haque called the episode "creative, visually impressive, and features some of the best random gags we've seen on the show in a long time." In 2019, to celebrate the show's 20th anniversary, IGN published a list of the 20 best Family Guy episodes, with "Road to the Multiverse" ranked the fourth best. Television critic Alex Rocha of TV Guide also found the episode to have "great laughs," saying that the show is "definitely off to a great start" to a new season. Tom Eames of entertainment website Digital Spy placed the episode at number one on his listing of the best Family Guy episodes in order of "yukyukyuks" and described the episode as "another crazy Brian and Stewie adventure". He noted that the story did not have "the most interesting plot", but got "more and more entertaining and so much fun" with every new world they featured in. He concluded that "coupled with Brian and Stewie front and centre, it made for the best Family Guy episode ever." The director of "Road to the Multiverse", Greg Colton, was awarded the Primetime Emmy Award for Outstanding Individual Achievement in Animation, for storyboarding the episode, on August 21, 2010, at the 62nd Primetime Emmy Awards's Creative Arts Awards.

In a 2012 interview, Seth MacFarlane stated: "As far as the all-around best episode, 'Road to the Multiverse' would have to be up there."

== Sequel ==
A video game sequel, Family Guy: Back to the Multiverse, was released in 2012. The game also serves as a continuation of the season 9 episode "The Big Bang Theory".
