= Wellesley Wild =

American screenwriter and producer

- Born: New York City, New York, U.S.
- Occupations: Screenwriter; producer; voice actor
- Years active: 1999–present

Wellesley Wild is an American screenwriter, producer, and voice actor. He is best known for writing and producing several episodes of the animated series Family Guy and for being the developer of the 2020 revival of Animaniacs. He was a former executive producer and an occasional voice actor for the former.

Wild attended Westminster School, a Founders League prep school located in Simsbury, Connecticut. Family Guy creator Seth MacFarlane also attended another Founders League school, the Kent School in Kent, Connecticut. Wild also wrote for The Late Late Show with Craig Kilborn during the show's first year.

== Career ==
Wild joined Family Guy in 2005, and has since written and produced multiple episodes, including:

- "Petarded"
- "PTV"
- "Petergeist"
- "Untitled Griffin Family History"
- "Stu and Stewie's Excellent Adventure"
- "Chick Cancer"
- "Barely Legal"
- "Road to Rupert"
- "Airport '07"
- "McStroke"
- "Long John Peter"
- "Tales of a Third Grade Nothing"
- "Family Gay"
- "Peter's Progress"
- "Road to the Multiverse"
- "Welcome Back, Carter"
- "Seahorse Seashell Party"
- "Internal Affairs"
- "Call Girl"
- "Boopa-dee Bappa-dee"
- "Trans-Fat"

In August 2010, Wild and his writing partner Alec Sulkin signed a three-year pact with 20th Century Fox TV. The two will continue working on Family Guy and will develop their own television series. Discussing whether the new series would be a live action or an animation, Wild said, "We've been throwing around both ideas." Their joint production, Dads premiered on September 17, 2013.

He co-wrote the 2012 film Ted with Sulkin and MacFarlane, and also wrote the 2014 film A Million Ways to Die in the West and Ted 2 (2015). He served as co-executive producer along with MacFarlane for MacFarlane's show, The Orville. Wild was also the showrunner for the revival of Animaniacs, which premiered on Hulu in 2020.

== Family ==
Through his English paternal grandfather Wellesley is a descendant of both Edward I (Longshanks) King of England (1272-1307) and Richard Colley Wellesley, 1st Marquess, brother of Arthur Wellesley, 1st Duke of Wellington.

Wild is also related to former CIA Director Porter Goss.
