= Meg Griffin =

Fictional character from the Family Guy franchise

- Family Guy character
- First appearance: "Death Has a Shadow" (1999)
- Created by: Seth MacFarlane
- Designed by: Seth MacFarlane
- Voiced by: Rachael MacFarlane (1998; original pilot, 2023; singing voice); Lacey Chabert (1999–2000); Mila Kunis (1999–present)

In-universe information
- Full name: Megan Griffin
- Gender: Female
- Occupation: 12th grader at Adam West High School
- Family: Peter Griffin (father); Lois Griffin (mother); Chris Griffin (brother); Stewie Griffin (brother); Brian Griffin (dog)
- Children: Liza Judy Barbara (surrogate daughter)
- Relatives: Carter Pewterschmidt (maternal grandfather); Barbara Pewterschmidt (maternal grandmother); Thelma Griffin (paternal grandmother); Francis Griffin (adoptive paternal grandfather); Mickey McFinnigan (biological paternal grandfather); Patrick Pewterschmidt (maternal uncle); Carol Pewterschmidt (maternal aunt); Chip Griffin (paternal uncle); Karen Griffin (paternal aunt); Bertram (half brother); Boston Stewie (half brother)
- Home: Quahog, Rhode Island
- Nationality: American
- Age: 18

Megan (Note: In the episode "A Fistful of Meg", it is revealed that Peter Griffin altered her name to Megatron Griffin on her birth certificate, though Lois Griffin had already chosen the name Megan, by which she is still commonly known.) "Meg" Griffin is a fictional character from the American animated television series Family Guy. She first appeared in the show's pilot episode, "Death Has a Shadow", on January 31, 1999. She was originally voiced by Lacey Chabert; however, she has been voiced by Mila Kunis since the show's second season. Writer Seth MacFarlane created and designed Meg after his 1995 student film, The Life of Larry, was picked up by 20th Century Fox for a series order. Meg is the eldest child and only daughter of Peter and Lois Griffin and the sister of Chris and Stewie. A social outcast, Meg is typically depicted as being mistreated and neglected by her family, though this has been downplayed in later seasons. Despite this, she is shown to be extremely talented and resourceful, having a kinder personality compared to the rest of her family.

== Personality ==
Similar to Lois, Meg has gone through numerous personality changes since the debut of the show in 1999. In early seasons, she was portrayed as a self-conscious and insecure adolescent. She is treated unfairly and abused by various people and has numerous insecurities that prompt her to try to be part of the "in-crowd". However, this only results in her getting rebuffed by the many bullies of this circle, particularly Connie D'Amico, the head cheerleader of the local high school, James Woods Regional High School. In contrast to this, a nerdy Jewish student named Neil Goldman is attracted to her, to her dismay.

While Meg is usually a pushover, she can get angry when pushed too far, though such occasions are usually rare. This can be seen in the episode "Seahorse Seashell Party", where she strongly insults and defames Peter, Lois, and even Chris for their inconsiderate actions toward her. In the episode "Road to Rupert", Meg assaults a man for insulting her after a fender-bender, and in "The Chicken or the Meg", she decapitates Ernie the Giant Chicken's head after a heated argument. In later seasons, she is shown to be very snarky and deliberately unpredictable towards others, such as in "The Marrying Kind", where she tells off Lois after the latter seeks validation for her jokes. Later seasons exaggerate her uncouth behavior and completely disregard her punching-bag status.

Despite her persistent mistreatment, Meg has proven a variety of times throughout the series that she is more talented and has greater potential than most people bother to realize, such as bird calls, playing the saxophone, speaking and singing in foreign languages, and even sports such as bowling, field hockey, basketball, roller derby, and even Olympic sports. However, her parents are unaware of her talents, oftentimes being completely surprised at her apparent skills.

Many of the show's storylines about Meg involve her trying to improve her life, finding a boyfriend, and reaching breaking points with her family and others who victimize her. She often becomes obsessed with men who show any kindness or affection to her, including the Griffins' friend and neighbor Joe Swanson in the episode "The Hand That Rocks the Wheelchair", and Brian in "Barely Legal". In addition to this, she has been shown to have suicidal tendencies, which has been exacerbated by the abuse she suffers at the hands of her parents.

== Voice actors ==
On the season 1 DVD commentary for the Drawn Together episode "Hot Tub", Cree Summer claims she was offered the role to play Meg but was dismissed by the producers. Meg was voiced by an uncredited Lacey Chabert for the first season, and by Mila Kunis in subsequent seasons after Chabert became busy with school and her role on Party of Five, although some of her work became second season episodes due to production order. Mila Kunis won the role after a series of auditions and callbacks where she was asked to speak more slowly and enunciate more; she was ultimately hired despite being unsure she understood what was expected of her. MacFarlane felt that Kunis invigorated the character, and that her work on That '70s Show showed she could command a scene. MacFarlane stated that Kunis "had a very natural quality to Meg" and she's "in a lot of ways [...] almost more right for the character". Kunis' voice is first heard as Meg in Episode 3 of season two "Da Boom", and the voices switch back and forth in the broadcast order until settling on Kunis. Tara Strong provides Meg's singing voice in "Don't Make Me Over". Archival recordings of Lacey Chabert's voice that she provided as Meg Griffin are used in the tenth season episode "Back to the Pilot" in which Brian and Stewie go back in time to the events of "Death Has a Shadow". However, Chabert does in fact return for the eleventh season episode "Yug Ylimaf" as Stewie references the fact that time has reversed so much that Meg's voice has reverted back from that of Kunis' to Chabert's.

- Lacey Chabert (1999–2000; 2011 archive recordings, 2012)
- Mila Kunis (1999–present)
- Tara Strong (singing voice)

== Social life ==
In the first three seasons of the show, Meg was portrayed with a more whiny and uptight personality who was often embarrassed by the family’s acts of bumbling and stupidity, though they cared for her and meant well. In the post-cancellation seasons, this began to change as the inadvertent embarrassment became deliberate bullying and disrespect. Additionally, the show started to flesh out the characters to the point where most of the population of Quahog who knows her, or even just meets her, picks on or disdains her for no reason other than her simply being "Meg".

Meg is depicted as being unpopular in high school due to both her plain appearance and personality. She desperately tries to be part of the cool crowd, but is usually coldly rebuffed. Because of her eagerness for acceptance, she has been recruited "unknowingly" into a suicidal religious cult, and later recruited again unwittingly into her school's Lesbian Alliance (in the episode "Brian Sings and Swings" ). However, Meg does have a moderate number of friends, the best of whom being a group of girls who are often seen with her during occasions such as her slumber parties and gossiping about boys. In later episodes, these girls, known by the names Beth, Patty, Collette, Esther, and Ruth, are characterized as being highly unpopular and dateless, much like Meg.

In some cases, Meg is depicted as being so unpopular at school that in one instance, a student fires a nail gun into his own abdomen twice (in shop class) in order to avoid a date with her, and in a later episode, another student shoots his own brother as an excuse not to go to a dance with her the following night. In "Don't Make Me Over", Lois is looking for new clothes for Meg, but with no luck; a saleswoman ends up pouring gasoline on herself, lighting a match, catching fire, and then jumping out of a window after looking at Meg in a pair of jeans. However, she is sought by nerd Neil Goldman. In "8 Simple Rules for Buying My Teenage Daughter", Neil starts dating a girl named Cecilia, Meg becomes instantly jealous and pretends to date Jake Tucker to make him jealous. This leads to her signing a contract to become Neil's girlfriend and (not knowing at first) his slave, but she gets him to tear up the contract after Lois seduces him. Perverted neighbor Glenn Quagmire has shown a repeated interest in her, mostly due to his very low standards, asking if she has reached the age of consent. Quagmire comes close to succeeding in "Meg and Quagmire" when Lois tells Peter to back off after he was ruining Meg and Quagmire's 'dates'. Then, they rescue Meg after Glenn takes her to his cabin, Peter and Lois arriving in time before anything happens. Joe and Cleveland are generally more accepting of her, with Cleveland allowing her to stay at his house when she's dealing with various family issues, such as in "Fifteen Minutes of Shame", and "Petarded". In very rare instances, he shows disdain over her, such as in "Hell Comes to Quahog".". In "The Hand That Rocks the Wheelchair", Joe rushes her to the hospital after she's accidentally run over by his vehicle, afterwards telling her that he's lucky to have her as his neighbor.

In several episodes she is shown dating, including stories with characters Mayor Adam West and nudist Jeff Campbell. She also loses her virginity unknowingly on live television to Saturday Night Live host Jimmy Fallon after having a drastic makeover; but, before all that happens, she goes out with a rebel at her school named Craig Hoffman. In "Jerome is the New Black", Jerome, an old flame of Lois's and Peter's new friend, admits to having sex with Meg, to which Peter replies indifferently. Carl is shown to have a dislike for her in "Movin' Out (Brian's Song)", which she reciprocates due to being fired from his convenience store. She is shown to be good friends with Bruce, who she hangs out with at the Bowling Alley.

In the episode "Brian Sings and Swings", a lesbian student named Sarah invites Meg to join in her Lesbian Alliance Club, with Meg not knowing at first what kind of club it was. Desperate to fit in, she pretends to be a lesbian and also pretends to be attracted to Sarah and even goes so far as to kiss her to prove it. At the end of the episode, Meg goes over to Sarah's house to admit she lied about being a lesbian (Sarah thought that Meg came over to have sex and even undresses when Meg is telling her that she lied), much to Glenn's (who was hiding in Sarah's closet) disappointment. She also used to have a crush on anchorman Tom Tucker, but it ended after she discovered his vanity and selfishness. In other episodes, she is portrayed as chronically incapable of finding a boyfriend. For her Junior Prom she accepts a pity date from Brian, the family dog and only after threatening suicide.

Earlier in season 2, she dated Joe Swanson's son Kevin Swanson, but in "Stew-Roids" it is mentioned that Kevin died in Iraq. In the episode, "Prick Up Your Ears", she dates a boy named Doug, but he breaks up with her when he sees her naked right before almost having sex. In the episode "Peter's Daughter", Meg falls in love with a medical student named Michael Milano after coming out of a short coma (caused by Peter when he asked her to "rescue" beer and make him a sandwich out of an already flooded kitchen) and they start to date. After he breaks up with Meg (because of Peter being overprotective of her after promising that if she came out of the coma, he would "treat her like a princess"), she announces that she is pregnant by Michael and the two get engaged. After finding out that she is not actually pregnant, Meg tells Michael the truth hoping that he will stay, however, Michael quickly leaves Meg at the altar. In the episode "Dial Meg for Murder", she is dating a convict, while in the episode "Go, Stewie, Go!" she dates an attractive young man named Anthony, who is absolutely normal (much to the surprise of many of the other characters). It is presumed that she broke up with him after he and Lois were caught kissing.

Overall, Meg has shown romantic interest in and dated several men throughout the series. However, there have been several instances in which she has shown hints of being bisexual or a lesbian: examples of this include "Brian Sings and Swings", "Stew-Roids", and "Dial Meg for Murder".

== Family life ==
Out of all the members of the family, her father Peter abuses her the most, making her the butt of his jokes and picking on her numerous times. Occasionally, when Meg asks a question to Peter or just speaks when he is in the room, Peter responds by saying "Shut up, Meg". Despite this, he is shown to care deeply about her in various episodes, such as in "Meg and Quagmire" when he goes out of his way to prevent friend and neighbor Glenn Quagmire from having sex with her, and in "This Little Piggy" where he tries to get Meg out of a foot fetishism business. In later seasons, Peter's kindness towards her is more open, sometimes showing remorsefulness in certain situations.

She is jokingly implied to have been unwanted by Lois and Peter numerous times in the show. For instance, In the episode "Stewie Kills Lois", Peter tells guests on a cruise ship about how he and Lois had gone to get an abortion but decided against it when they arrived at the clinic and found out the abortionist had one hand. He then says "two and a half months later, our daughter Meg was born" – Much to Lois's embarrassment, causing her to get mad with Peter. In numerous episodes, she is jokingly implied to have been dropped off at a Fire Station when she was an Infant, such as in "Ratings Guy" and "Baking Sad".

Brian's attention initially softens the lack of respect from Peter and the rest of family; he admits that he cares for Meg when she goes out with Mayor Adam West. While initially seeming to have more common decency for Meg than most people, this appears to almost completely disappear after the tenth season, as Brian's increasingly shallow and self-centered character begins to take more pleasure and joy in being rotten to Meg and often refuses to give her the time of day, such as desperately trying to avoid having to comfort her, finding humor in her being puked on, and even willing to deliberately urinate on her bed. Stewie on the other hand occasionally shows disdain towards her due to his personality, but softens up towards her in numerous episodes. In "Stand By Meg", she saves him from choking to death on a grape, earning his respect towards her. He is also shown to prefer sitting on Meg's lap numerous times throughout the show, as opposed to Lois. In some episodes, Brian and Stewie attempt to help Meg numerous times throughout the show, such as in "Leggo My Meg-O", where they rescue her from Human Traffickers, and "Baking Sad", where they help her start up a cookie business.

Her most significant relationship is with her brother Chris, where he sometimes shares the brunt of the family's abuse just like her. In numerous episodes they're seen teaming up, such as in "The Heartbreak Dog", where they both steal from a retirement home to get back at the residents mistreating her, and "Young Parent Trap", where they disguise themselves as a young couple to spy on Peter and Lois on vacation. Despite this, he is sometimes shown to abuse her, such as in "Better Off Meg" where he capitalizes on her falsified death to gain popularity within school (and kidnaps her when she comes back).

Meg's most complicated relationship among the family members after Peter would be with her mother Lois. Although not as abusive as Peter, Lois seldom (if ever) reprimands her husband for their treatment of their daughter and tends to be rather thoughtless of Meg herself, often putting her down for her lack of social achievement or social popularity. Throughout the series, Lois can best be described as a general foil to her daughter, being more rebellious, outgoing, and loose-spirited compared to her daughter's own uptight demeanor, easily-embarrassed personality, and lack of confidence. Before the more recent seasons of the series, Lois has also often shown sympathy for Meg and tried to boost her confidence in terms of teenage social matters. Despite this, such occasions resulted in her former getting carried away and stealing the show from Meg, such as in "A Fish out of Water". The most significant example of her cruelty towards her would be in "Stew-Roids", where she encourages Meg to commit suicide by giving her a Sylvia Plath novel and a bottle of Ambien, proclaiming "Whatever happens, happens". Despite this, she is shown to deeply care for her in numerous episodes by having a normal mother-daughter relationship and going out of her way to defend her. For example, In "Barely Legal" she is angered when Brian confesses to making out with Meg at her Junior Prom, and in "Snapple Decision", she defends her from kidnappers who attempt to abduct them during a vacation gone wrong.

While she is well aware of how poorly she is treated by others, Meg is usually much too fragile and passive to push back or retaliate against her family and school tormentors. The family's treatment of Meg, however, finally reaches her limit in "Dial Meg for Murder" when Meg emerges from a short stint in a Young Offenders Institution as a hardened criminal, abusing her family and beating up anyone who makes fun of her. It is only after a conversation with Brian that she changes her ways. However, it comes to a head once again in "Seahorse Seashell Party", when Meg finally grows tired of her mistreatment and lashes out against Lois and Peter, informing them of their own flaws. Meg tells Lois that she is far from the perfect parent, harshly berates her for constantly and ruthlessly pointing out Meg's shortcomings. This breaks Lois' heart and she finally admits that she's been a terrible mother to Meg. She then turns on Peter, calling him a "waste of a man". After a short fight between the rest of the family, Brian talks to meg and says that he likes how she stood up for herself, but she sadly tells him that even though she meant every word, seeing Peter turn on everyone like wolves has made her think that it is ultimately her non-ideal role to serve as the Griffins' "lightning rod that absorbs all the dysfunction". He commends her on her maturity, and even goes on to say that Meg is the strongest person in the family. She soon apologizes to the others and says that she is actually the one at fault, with the family reconciling and hugging afterwards.

Unlike her youngest brother Stewie, who considers the rest of the family's stupidity and shortcomings as little more than a nuisance and a hindrance to his chances at life and expresses desires to renounce or even dispose of them, Meg is far less willing to renounce, betray, or permanently abandon the other Griffins for their general disdain and indifference of her and generally stands by her family out of loyalty, often at the cost of significant opportunities and even a potentially better life.

The abuse that Meg receives begins to fade away as a running gag by the start of Season 14, notably in "Peter's Sister", where she notices that Peter's pro wrestler sister Karen treats Peter exactly the way Peter treats her. They bond over this with a plan to embarrass Karen at a wrestling show—which goes awry when Meg hits her with a metal folding chair instead of a breakaway one and injures Karen to the point where she ends up in a coma. In more recent seasons (From 20 onwards), she is rarely abused, if at all, with her family embracing her instead of ridiculing her.

== Reception ==
Reception of Meg Griffin's character has been mostly positive, with her being ranked number 11 on "IGN's Top 25 Family Guy Characters". However, critical reception on her character has been mixed, with most criticism headed towards how the writers handled her character. In a review for "Seahorse Seashell Party", Kevin McFarland of The A.V. Club wrote "I feel bad about Meg becoming the scapegoat. Not because she’s a good character, but because instead of tweaking and working to make her appreciated or comically valuable, Family Guy spent years going down the path of least resistance and simply joined the fan chorus of hatred. One episode of pointed, forced justification for that shift doesn’t change a thing."

In an interview, Mila Kunis stated: "Meg gets picked on a lot. But it's funny. It's like the middle child. She is constantly in the state of being an awkward 16-year-old, when you're kind of going through puberty and what-not. She's just in perpetual mode of humiliation, and it's fun."

In November 2016, when asked by Splitsider if the writers will further develop the characters of Chris and Meg in future episodes, showrunner Alec Sulkin confirmed that the series crew members are working on doing so and added that there are plans for an episode where Meg comes out as a lesbian, taking inspiration from previous instances in which she exhibited signs of lesbian characteristics, like when she joins a lesbian alliance group at school in "Brian Sings and Swings" and is identified as a "transgender man" named "Ron" in Stewie Griffin: The Untold Story, the latter which takes place in the future. However, Sulkin also noted that the plotline has not yet been finalized and thus isn't officially set to be used in an episode.
