= Alec Sulkin =

American screenwriter, producer, and voice actor (born 1973)

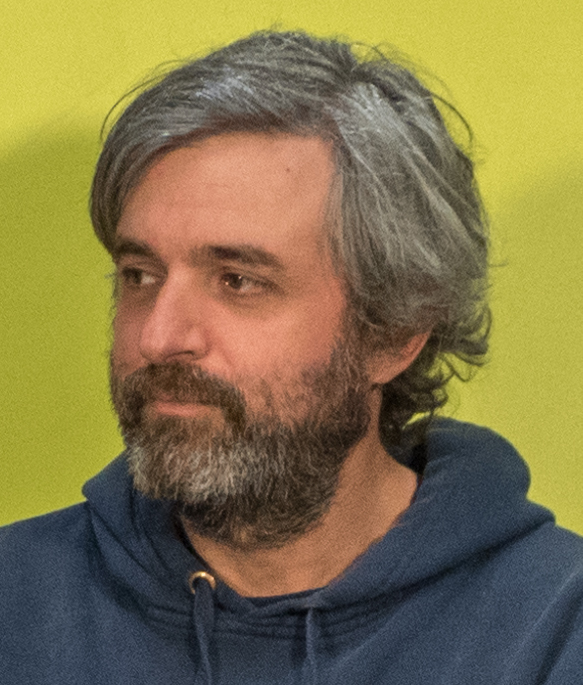
- Sulkin at the New York Comic Con in 2018
- Born: Alec Matthew Sulkin; February 14, 1973 (age 53)
- Education: Connecticut College
- Occupations: Writer, producer, voice actor
- Years active: 1999–present
- Spouse: Tal Rabinowitz
- Children: 1

Alexander Matthew Sulkin (born February 14, 1973) is an American screenwriter, producer, and voice actor best known for his work on Family Guy and The Cleveland Show.

== Career ==
Sulkin began as a writer for The Late Late Show with Craig Kilborn, during the show's first three years. On the August 18, 2014 WTF podcast, he stated that he got the job after being recommended by Wellesley Wild.

Sulkin joined Family Guy in 2005, and has since produced, written and provided voices for multiple episodes, including the hour-long Star Wars homage, "Blue Harvest", as well as "Chick Cancer", "Stew-Roids", "Stu and Stewie's Excellent Adventure", "Screams of Silence: The Story of Brenda Q", "Family Guy Viewer Mail #2" (with Tom Devanney and Deepak Sethi), "Into Fat Air", "Grimm Job" and "3 Acts of God".

In August, 2010, Sulkin and his writing partner Wellesley Wild signed a three-year pact with 20th Century Fox TV. In 2013, Sulkin and Wild produced a sitcom titled Dads, with MacFarlane as executive producer. The series was cancelled after one season. In 2012, Sulkin co-wrote the well-received comedy Ted, along with MacFarlane and Wild. All three then co-wrote the 2015 sequel Ted 2.

Sulkin, along with Family Guy writers Julius Sharpe, Danny Smith, John Viener, Patrick Meighan and Seth MacFarlane were special material writers for the 85th Academy Awards, in which the latter was the host.

Sulkin co-wrote the script of the 2014 film A Million Ways to Die in the West, along with MacFarlane and Wild.

Starting with Season 16, Sulkin, alongside Richard Appel became the new showrunners for Family Guy.

== Twitter ==
In addition to television writing, Sulkin has garnered a sizable following on the social networking service, Twitter.

In March 2011, Sulkin caused a controversy by posting the following joke on Twitter: "If you wanna feel better about this earthquake in Japan, google 'Pearl Harbor death toll.'" Sulkin made the comment one day after the 2011 Tōhoku earthquake, which killed over 10,000 people in Japan. The following day, Sulkin deleted the joke and apologized, saying the post was insensitive and that he had not realized the extent and severity of the disaster.

== Personal life ==
Sulkin dated Sarah Silverman briefly in 2010.

He is Jewish.
