= Family Guy season 8 =

Season of television series

Family Guy
- Season 8
- DVD covers for Volumes 8 and 9
- Showrunners: Mark Hentemann; Steve Callaghan
- Starring: Seth MacFarlane; Alex Borstein; Seth Green; Mila Kunis; Mike Henry
- No. of episodes: 20 (US); 21 (UK)

Release
- Original network: Fox (episodes 1-20); BBC Three (episode 21)
- Original release: September 27, 2009 – May 23, 2010 (US); June 20, 2010 (UK)

Season chronology
- ← Previous; Season 7 Next → Season 9

The eighth season of animated television series Family Guy first aired on the Fox network in twenty episodes from September 27, 2009, to May 23, 2010, before being released as two DVD box sets and in syndication. It ran on Sunday nights between May and July 2010 on BBC Three in the UK. The series follows the dysfunctional Griffin family—father Peter, mother Lois, daughter Meg, son Chris, baby Stewie and dog Brian, all of whom reside in their hometown of Quahog.

As of season eight, the series entered its seventh production season. Production season seven was executive produced by Chris Sheridan, David Goodman, Danny Smith, Mark Hentemann, Steve Callaghan and series creator Seth MacFarlane. The season's showrunners were Hentemann and Callaghan, both of whom replaced previous showrunners Goodman and Sheridan. It was the last season of Family Guy to be produced in 4:3 and standard definition.

The season received mixed reviews from critics, who cited a lack of original writing. More positive assessments revolved around the "tail end of the season," which "threw out all its old conventions and tried something remarkably different." Season eight contains some of the series' most acclaimed episodes, including "Road to the Multiverse", "Something, Something, Something, Dark Side" and "Dog Gone", as well as some of the most controversial episodes, including "Extra Large Medium", "Brian & Stewie", "Quagmire's Dad" and "Partial Terms of Endearment," which was banned from being aired on American TV, but has been released on DVD (as both a standalone episode and as part of the complete season set) and saw broadcast in the UK on BBC Three. It was the recipient of a Primetime Emmy Award for Outstanding Individual Achievement in Animation and a Genesis Award for television comedy, and was nominated for a Primetime Emmy Award for Outstanding Original Music and Lyrics.

The Volume Eight DVD box set was released in Region 1 on June 15, 2010, Region 2 on November 1, 2010 and Region 4 on August 17, 2010. Eight of the twenty-one episodes are included in the volume. The remaining eleven episodes of the season were released on the Volume Nine DVD box set in Region 1 on December 13, 2011, and was released in Region 2 on May 9, 2011, and Region 4 on June 15, 2011. The other two episodes were released independently on DVD.

== Voice cast and characters ==
- Seth MacFarlane as Peter Griffin, Brian Griffin, Stewie Griffin, Glenn Quagmire, Tom Tucker, Carter Pewterschmidt, Dr. Elmer Hartman, Dan Quagmire/Ida Davis
- Alex Borstein as Lois Griffin, Tricia Takanawa, Babs Pewterschmidt
- Seth Green as Chris Griffin
- Mila Kunis as Meg Griffin
- Mike Henry as Cleveland Brown, Herbert, Bruce, Rallo Tubbs

=== Supporting characters ===
- Lori Alan as Diane Simmons
- H. Jon Benjamin as Carl
- Johnny Brennan as Mort Goldman, Horace
- Gary Cole as Principal Shepherd
- Carrie Fisher as Angela
- Kevin Michael Richardson as Jerome, Cleveland Jr.
- Patrick Warburton as Joe Swanson
- Adam West as Mayor Adam West
- Lisa Wilhoit as Connie D'Amico
- James Woods as himself

=== Guest Star Characters ===
- Sanaa Lathan as Donna Tubbs

== Episodes ==
No. overall	No. in season	Title	Directed by	Written by	Original release date	Prod. code	U.S. viewers (millions)
127	1	"Road to the Multiverse"	Greg Colton	Wellesley Wild	September 27, 2009	7ACX06	10.11
Stewie shows Brian a remote control that allows him to access parallel universes depicting Quahog in the same time and place, but under different conditions. Travelling to a universe where humans are subservient to dogs, Stewie is unable to figure out how to modify the device so that they can return home. Brian is reluctant to leave and forcefully swipes the remote, accidentally breaking it. The two head to the universe's Griffin family, who are all dogs, except for their pet Brian, who is human. The dog version of Stewie explains that he has developed his own remote control. While he goes to fetch it, human Stewie bites the dog version of Peter and is sent to the human pound, where he will be euthanized. Human Brian, regular Brian, and dog Stewie go to the pound, free Stewie, and both regular Stewie and regular Brian are sent back to their universe.
128	2	"Family Goy"	James Purdum	Mark Hentemann	October 4, 2009	7ACX01	9.86
Peter discovers a lump on Lois's breast, and the two go to the hospital to have it tested. The test shows the lump to be benign, but Dr. Hartman discovers, by looking in her medical records, that Lois's mother was a Holocaust survivor, meaning Lois and her children are Jewish. Despite being Catholic, Peter becomes a devout Jew, much to Lois's chagrin. That night, Peter is visited by the ghost of his father, who warns him that he will go to Hell if he is not Catholic. The next day, Peter decides to convert the family back, and becomes prejudiced against Lois for her Jewish heritage. When Lois's mother advises not to let Peter suppress her identity, Lois decides to hold Passover, which Peter tries to ruin. Jesus then appears and settles the couple's disputes. In a minor subplot, Quagmire learns about internet porn and gains large muscles after masturbating to it.
129	3	"Spies Reminiscent of Us"	Cyndi Tang	Alec Sulkin	October 11, 2009	7ACX03	8.97
Actors Chevy Chase and Dan Aykroyd begin living in the neighborhood, causing Stewie and Brian to investigate. Discovering a secret underground military facility, they learn that the actors are government spies. They try to warn Mayor West about a deactivated Russian sleeper agent in Quahog, only to discover that West is actually the sleeper agent. During the ensuing fight Aykroyd plants a homing beacon on West's leg. West escapes to Russia and the four quickly follow him. They are soon captured under orders of Vladimir Putin, who explains that word of the sleeper agents would be an embarrassment to their government, and offers to help them stop West from fulfilling his mission. By the time the four find West, they watch him launch a missile aimed for the United States, but Aykroyd is able to hack into the missile's guidance system, allowing him to aim the warhead high above the atmosphere where it harmlessly explodes. Meanwhile, after Peter tells Quagmire and Joe about how Chase and Aykroyd criticized Peter's comedy skill, Quagmire convinces Peter and Joe to form an Improv comedy troupe with him. Unfortunately, Peter loses interest and ruins the group with his shenanigans.
130	4	"Brian's Got a Brand New Bag"	Pete Michels	Tom Devanney	November 8, 2009	7ACX02	7.26
While driving with Brian, Peter accidentally crashes into a woman's car, leading Brian to take interest in her and ask her out on a date. He arrives at her house to pick her up, but soon finds himself attracted to her mother, Rita, and sneaks her home that night. Knowing he would become a laughing stock if the family found out he was going out with an older woman, he hides her until the next morning. Later, Brian bumps into the family and is ridiculed, and Lois invites Rita to dinner with the intention of getting her to reveal her age. At dinner, Rita is succumbed into admitting she is fifty. Infuriated with his family, Brian goes to console Rita, and proposes marriage. Later that night, Rita accidentally breaks her hip, and Peter warns Brian that the relationship will not last much longer now that Brian must run errands. Brian then succumbs to the temptation of having sex with another, younger woman, and Rita decides Brian is too young for her.
131	5	"Hannah Banana"	John Holmquist	Cherry Chevapravatdumrong	November 8, 2009	7ACX05	8.00
Stewie learns that Miley Cyrus will be hosting a concert in Quahog, but tickets to the show sold out in mere seconds. He sneaks in backstage, and Miley Cyrus soon becomes Stewie's best friend. Once he notices something strange about her, however, he discovers that she is an android. Stewie attempts to reprogram Miley for use as Brian's sex toy. This backfires when Stewie causes a short-circuit and she rampages through the city. Meanwhile, Chris does poorly on a test at school and blames the Evil Monkey living in his closet. Peter and Lois are fed up with him talking about the monkey, and claim it does not exist. Chris then captures the monkey and shows it to the family. The monkey then goes on to explain his backstory, claiming the entire event is a huge misunderstanding. As it turns out, the monkey discovered his wife had committed Adultery one night resulting in divorce. As result, the "Evil Monkey" found himself spiraling into depression which cost him his job and home. These events forced him to move into Chris' closet where he lived for nine years. Chris is at first unconvinced, but when the monkey helps him write a book report, they become friends. Later, the group sees Miley destroying the city after Stewie unsuccessfully re-wires her, and the monkey confronts her. He is taken to the top of a skyscraper, so Peter recruits Quagmire to shoot her down in a biplane and save the monkey. After Quagmire and Peter destroy the android Miley and save the monkey, the latter decides it's time to move out and does so.
132	6	"Quagmire's Baby"	Jerry Langford	Patrick Meighan	November 15, 2009	7ACX04	8.50
When Peter goes to Quagmire's house, he notices a baby in a basket by the door. The baby is Quagmire's illegitimate daughter. Quagmire then takes her in and names her Anna Lee. When the baby ends up deeply cutting into his sex life, Joe convinces Quagmire to put her up for adoption, and he reluctantly does so. Later, while at a strip bar, Quagmire cannot stop thinking about Anna Lee, and they go to her adoptive family's home to get her back. They see how well the new family treats her and Quagmire decides that she belongs there. Meanwhile, Stewie makes an unintelligent clone of himself, and introduces the clone to Brian, who becomes interested in having a clone of his own. Stewie then makes one for Brian, and the clones perform all of their chores.
133	7	"Jerome Is the New Black"	Brian Iles	John Viener	November 22, 2009	7ACX08	7.48
Upset that Cleveland left Quahog, Peter, Joe and Quagmire decide to interview people to fill the vacancy, and are approached by Jerome. After he impresses the group, they decide to let him join. When Peter introduces Jerome to Lois, she reveals that the two used to date. Jealous, Peter inadvertently causes a fire, later that night, which burns down Jerome's house. The next morning, Peter discovers that Lois has invited Jerome to live with them. As time goes on, Peter cannot contain his jealousy and eventually kicks him out. During an argument, Lois convinces Peter to apologize to Jerome, who accepts his apology. Meanwhile, Brian offers to be the fourth member of the group, until Peter tells him that Quagmire dislikes him. Brian is shocked to learn this and tries to make friends with Quagmire. He tricks Quagmire into going to dinner with him, where Quagmire unleashes a tirade in which he outlines everything offensive Brian has ever done.
134	8	"Dog Gone"	Julius Wu	Steve Callaghan	November 29, 2009	7ACX07	8.50
Brian receives an invitation to an award ceremony celebrating his novel, but soon discovers that all the club members are intellectually disabled. He decides to drown his sorrows at the local bar, and runs over a dog on the way home. He secretly buries the dog's body, but eventually confesses. He quickly learns, however, that no one cares if a dog is killed. Outraged, Brian starts a group to convince people that the life of an animal is just as important as a human's, with little success. Later, in an attempt to cheer up Brian, Stewie takes his dog collar and places it on a stray, which he kills in a fire. The family is devastated because they believe Brian is dead, and begin to cry. When he sees this, Brian realizes his life does have a purpose, and thanks Stewie for helping him. Meanwhile, Lois hires an Hispanic maid named Consuela, who quickly proves to be very stubborn.
135	9	"Business Guy"	Pete Michels	Andrew Goldberg & Alex Carter	December 13, 2009	7ACX11	7.66
Peter is shocked to find out that Lois's father, Carter, has never had a bachelor party, so he takes him to a strip club, and gives him the time of his life. In his excitement, Carter ends up having a heart attack and falls into a coma. Carter's will leaves Lois in control of his billion-dollar company, but Peter soon takes over. Peter then fires the entire board of directors, and creates several ridiculous items. Carter awakens from his coma and confronts Peter, demanding that he relinquish control of the company. Lois and Carter try to negotiate with Peter, who agrees to give Carter employment as a janitor. Carter and Lois decide to trick Peter into surrendering the company by scaring him into believing a swamp monster will eat him, causing Peter to agree.
136	10	"Big Man on Hippocampus"	Dominic Bianchi	Brian Scully	January 3, 2010	7ACX09	8.16
Peter gets in a fight and hits his head, causing him to develop amnesia. This causes him to forget everything about his life, including his family. Lois decides to reintroduce Peter to his old self, including his sex life, in an attempt to jog his memory. Later, Peter mistakenly believes himself free to have sexual relations with other women. Deeply angered, Lois and the rest of the family decide to move out and leave Peter. Quagmire takes the opportunity to finally pursue a relationship with Lois. When Peter returns home later that night, Brian warns him about this development, and Peter reveals that he finally regained his memory. He then rushes to reclaim Lois, while Quagmire's plans had been stymied by guilt-induced impotence.
137	11	"Dial Meg for Murder"	Cyndi Tang	Alex Carter & Andrew Goldberg	January 31, 2010	7ACX12	6.19
Peter gets more than he bargained for when he joins the rodeo, albeit by cheating, which gets the best of him when he is raped by a bull at a rodeo. During the occurrence, Brian meets the editor for a magazine, starts following Meg as research for an article on teenage life, and discovers she has fallen in love with Luke, a prison inmate. Brian reveals Meg's secret to Peter and Lois, who forbid her from seeing the inmate. Luke then breaks out of jail and tries to hide in the Griffin family home. Peter alerts Joe, who apprehends the criminal. Joe also arrests Meg for harboring a fugitive, and she is sent to prison. Three months later, Meg returns home a hardened criminal and abuses her family and friends. Wanting to start a new life away from home, Meg ambushes Brian in his car and forces him to drive to the pharmacy to rob the store. In an attempt to stop her, Brian shows Meg the article he wrote, in which he describes her as "far sweeter and kinder" than the typical American girl. Touched by this, Meg returns home and thanks Brian.
138	12	"Extra Large Medium"	John Holmquist	Steve Callaghan	February 14, 2010	7ACX14	6.44
When the Griffin family go for a hike, Chris and Stewie get lost, and Lois decides to seek the advice of a psychic. Lois becomes obsessed with the psychic, to the annoyance of a skeptical Brian. In defiance of Lois, Brian has Peter perform a cold reading on a passerby, to demonstrate that psychic readings are purely an act. Peter is struck by his success, however, and decides to capitalize on his newfound ability. Soon after, Joe requests Peter's help in a search for a missing person who has been strapped to a bomb. Peter stalls for time during the search, "summoning" the ghost of Lou Costello and doing the "Who's on First?" routine with the victim's last name, which eventually results in a gruesome death when the bomb explodes. Meanwhile, Chris goes on a date with a mentally challenged girl at his school named Ellen. However, Ellen is pushy and demanding, and the relationship quickly falls apart.
139	13	"Go, Stewie, Go!"	Greg Colton	Gary Janetti	March 14, 2010	7ACX15	6.66
Brian notices Stewie watching Jolly Farm Revue, and tells him about upcoming auditions for the show. They go to the auditions but learn that only girls are being interviewed. Stewie then cross-dresses to get an audition, naming his new identity "Karina" and wins the role. Later, Stewie falls in love with Julie, who professes her love for Karina, wishing that she was a boy, and Stewie reveals his true self. Shocked, Julie refuses to speak to him, and Stewie regrets coming out. Meanwhile, Peter insults Lois about her age, and she longs for a younger man. Meg brings home Anthony, a new boyfriend, and makes out with him. Lois is jealous and makes advances toward Anthony, and eventually makes out with him. Peter then admits that he was actually embarrassed about his own age, and was only insulting Lois in order to stop her from seeing she could be with a much better man.
140	14	"Peter-assment"	Julius Wu	Chris Sheridan	March 21, 2010	7ACX16	6.67
Peter becomes a paparazzo, and begins recording local celebrities, including Ollie Williams, who breaks Peter's glasses. Unable to get his glasses fixed for work, he decides to wear contacts. Once he arrives, his boss, Angela, begins making disturbing sexual advances. Eventually, Angela invites Peter over to her house under the guise of working on a "project" leading Peter to quickly deduce she intends to have sex with him. Using Quagmire as a double Peter agrees to have sex with her, but Quagmire backs out when he loses interest resulting in Peter being fired. Later that night, Peter drives back to Angela's house and discovers she is attempting to commit suicide. He rescues her, and Angela confesses that she has no hope in life. Peter decides to have dinner with her, where she tries to seduce him, threatening to kill herself if he refuses sex. Peter then agrees, this time using Mort as a double which rekindles Angela's will to live. Angela then rehires Peter, after thanking him for making her life whole again.
141	15	"Brian Griffin's House of Payne"	Jerry Langford	Spencer Porter	March 28, 2010	7ACX13	7.32
Stewie finds an old script that Brian wrote, and suggests Lois read it. Reluctant to at first, Lois ends up loving it, and suggests he meet with executives about producing a drama show. Brian pitches the script to CBS, who respond positively. The producers bring in James Woods, however, who wins the role. The CBS executives then turn Brian's drama into a comedy. Frustrated, Brian tries to make the producers return to the original plot, but ends up quitting when they refuse. Meanwhile, Meg and Chris bump into Stewie, and he falls down the stairs, unconscious. Attempting to hide the accident, Meg and Chris are approached by Peter, who suggests they frame Lois for causing the injury. Noticing her pulling out of the driveway, Peter throws Stewie behind her tire, and Lois runs him over. Lois then suggests they frame someone else, and Peter tells her they should take Stewie to the hospital.
142	16	"April in Quahog"	Joseph Lee	John Viener	April 11, 2010	7ACX18	6.96
The people of Quahog are misled into believing that a black hole will suck up the entire planet in just 24 hours, and all life on Earth will be destroyed. Everybody in Quahog then frantically tries to live out their last day on Earth. This puts Peter, Lois and the adults of Quahog in an angry mood and awkward position when the black hole turns out to have just been an April Fools' Day prank played by Chris and the local news team. Worse, Peter reveals his secret that he hated being around the children just before the event was called off as a prank at the point where everyone would "accept their fate." The children shun him in anger, and Lois becomes furious at Peter for revealing his negative secret. Peter must bond with the children in order to win their hearts back before the family tears apart.
143	17	"Brian & Stewie"	Dominic Bianchi	Gary Janetti	May 2, 2010	7ACX20	7.40
Brian and Stewie get locked in a bank vault and become trapped. Brian wakes up in the middle of the night and opens a bottle of scotch. When he accidentally wakes up Stewie, they share the scotch. While drunk, Stewie tells Brian that his life has no purpose, and Brian becomes infuriated. A fight ensues, and Stewie draws a gun from Brian's safety deposit box in the vault. The next morning, Stewie asks Brian why he has the gun, and he reveals that he keeps it in case he ever wants to commit suicide. Shocked, Stewie asks why he is so unhappy, and Brian notes it is because his life has no purpose. Feeling sorry for him, Stewie says that he loves Brian, and he would not be able to live without him. They drift off to sleep, and the bank vault suddenly opens.
144	18	"Quagmire's Dad"	Pete Michels	Tom Devanney	May 9, 2010	7ACX19	7.22
Joe and Peter visit Quagmire, and are introduced to his father, Dan. They are surprised by Dan's gay mannerisms, however, and after Quagmire invites Peter and Lois to the Naval Ball to be held in his father's honor, they begin arguing over the issue. Quagmire confronts Dan, and his father states that he has scheduled a sex change. The surgery is a success, and Dan emerges as "Ida." That night, Ida and Quagmire join the Griffins for dinner. Quagmire becomes frustrated when the conversation turns towards Ida's surgery, and suddenly storms out of the room. At Quagmire's home, he tells Ida that he cannot deal with the change. Saddened, Ida leaves her son's home and decides to stay at a nearby hotel. There, she meets Brian, and after several drinks, Brian sleeps with Ida which leads to Quagmire to become enraged.
145	19	"The Splendid Source"	Brian Iles	Based on a short story by : Richard Matheson; Teleplay by : Mark Hentemann	May 16, 2010	7ACX17	7.71
Chris tells his parents that he has been suspended from school for telling a dirty joke to his friends. Revealing he heard it from Quagmire, Peter questions where Quagmire heard the joke and eventually finds that the joke originated with a Virginia bartender. Setting out from Quahog, the group enters the bar in question and find that it was Cleveland who told the bartender the joke. When Cleveland is asked where he heard it, he reveals that it was from a bellhop in Washington, D.C. The group, along with Cleveland, then set out on the road and are attacked, captured, and thrown on a plane. The plane lands on an island where they are led to a large stone temple, and enter a large library with all of the world's greatest geniuses studying inside. They are not permitted to leave the island, however, and are locked in a jail cell. The group then breaks out, and set the temple on fire.
146	20	"Something, Something, Something, Dark Side"	Dominic Polcino	Kirker Butler	May 23, 2010 (Note: This episode was first released in Something, Something, Something, Dark Side DVD on December 22, 2009.)	6ACX21	6.31
146	20	"Something, Something, Something, Dark Side"	Dominic Polcino	Kirker Butler	May 23, 2010	6ACX22	6.31
While being chased by Darth Vader (Stewie) on the planet Hoth, young Luke Skywalker (Chris) has a vision of his dead mentor Obi-Wan Kenobi (Herbert), who tells him to go to the planet Dagobah and learn the ways of the Force from Jedi Master Yoda (Carl). Luke has a vision of the Empire capturing his friends and forgoes his Jedi training in order to save them by confronting Vader. Luke arrives at Cloud City and engages Vader in a lightsaber duel. Vader cuts off Luke's right hand, and with Luke cornered and defenseless, Vader goads him to join the dark side, and then reveals that he is his father.
147	21	"Partial Terms of Endearment"	Joseph Lee	Danny Smith	June 20, 2010 (BBC Three); September 28, 2010 (DVD) (Note: Fox has stated the episode "Partial Terms of Endearment" has been refused airtime on their network. However, it premiered on British television on June 20, 2010 on BBC Three. The episode was later aired on Australian television on April 11, 2011 on 7mate, and on Dutch television on August 7, 2011 on Comedy Central (Netherlands). An airdate has not been given for the United States (if the episode will air at all), but it was only released on DVD in Region 1 on September 28, 2010.)	7ACX10	1.04 (BBC Three)
Lois runs into her old friend Naomi, who reveals that she and her husband are having difficulty conceiving a child. She then asks Lois if she will be a surrogate mother. Lois decides to do so, and Peter becomes upset when he finds out. Despite this, Lois has the procedure performed, and Peter attempts to cause Lois to have a miscarriage. Suddenly, the local news reveals there has been a car crash, with Naomi and her husband pronounced dead. Devastated, Lois must choose whether or not to abort the baby, or put it up for adoption. In an attempt to make a decision, Lois and Peter visit the Family Planning Center, and decide to have an abortion performed. As Peter exits the center he comes across an anti-abortion rally and changes his mind. When they return home, they discuss if they should have the abortion or not. After the discussion, Lois goes ahead with abortion. Note: this episode was banned from airing on FOX due to its handling of its abortion debate.

== Production ==
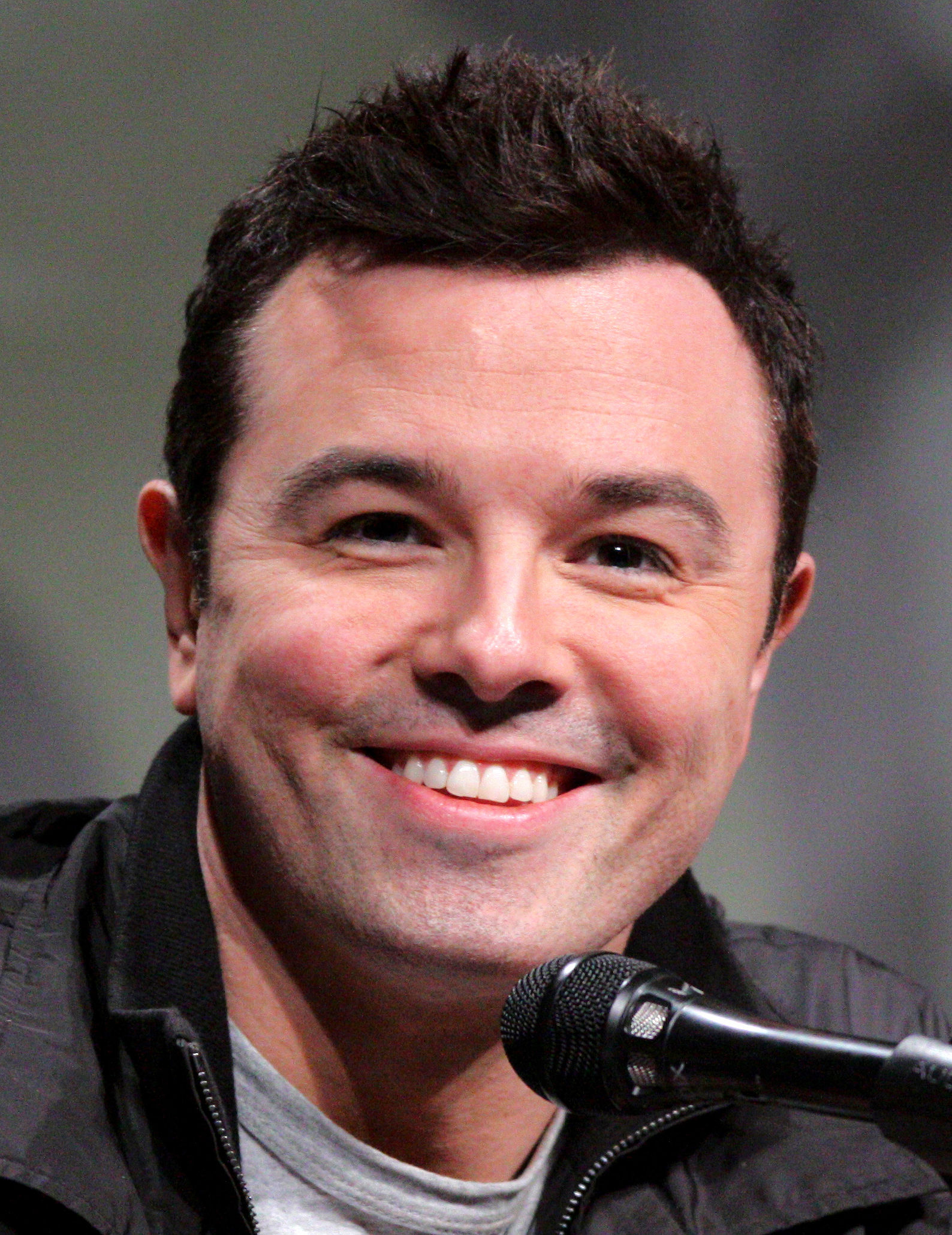
Seth MacFarlane served as executive producer for the season, along with several other writers for the series.

Production for the eighth season began in 2008, during the airing of the seventh season. The season was executive produced by series regulars Chris Sheridan, David Goodman, Danny Smith, Mark Hentemann and Steve Callaghan, along with series creator Seth MacFarlane. The showrunners for the eighth season were Hentemann and Callaghan, who replaced Goodman and Sheridan, following the conclusion of the seventh production season.

As production began, Callaghan, Andrew Goldberg, Mark Hentemann, Patrick Meighan, Brian Scully, Chris Sheridan, Danny Smith, Alec Sulkin, John Viener and Wellesley Wild all stayed on from the previous season. Spencer Porter received his first writing credit for the series. Former recurring writers Kirker Butler and Gary Janetti returned to the series, with Butler leaving immediately afterward to work on The Cleveland Show. Matt Fleckenstein, who wrote two episodes for the show, left the series before the beginning of the eighth season.

Joseph Lee received his first directing credit for the series. Dominic Bianchi, Greg Colton, John Holmquist, Brian Iles, Jerry Langford, Pete Michels, James Purdum, Cyndi Tang and Julius Wu all stayed with the show from the previous season. "Blue Harvest" director Dominic Polcino briefly returned to the series to direct the episode's sequel, entitled "Something, Something, Something, Dark Side". Former recurring director Mike Kim left the series.

The main cast consisted of Seth MacFarlane (Peter Griffin, Stewie Griffin, Brian Griffin, Quagmire and Tom Tucker, among others), Alex Borstein (Lois Griffin, Loretta Brown, Tricia Takanawa and Barbara Pewterschmidt, among others), Mila Kunis (Meg Griffin), Seth Green (Chris Griffin and Neil Goldman, among others) and Mike Henry (Cleveland Brown and Herbert, among others).

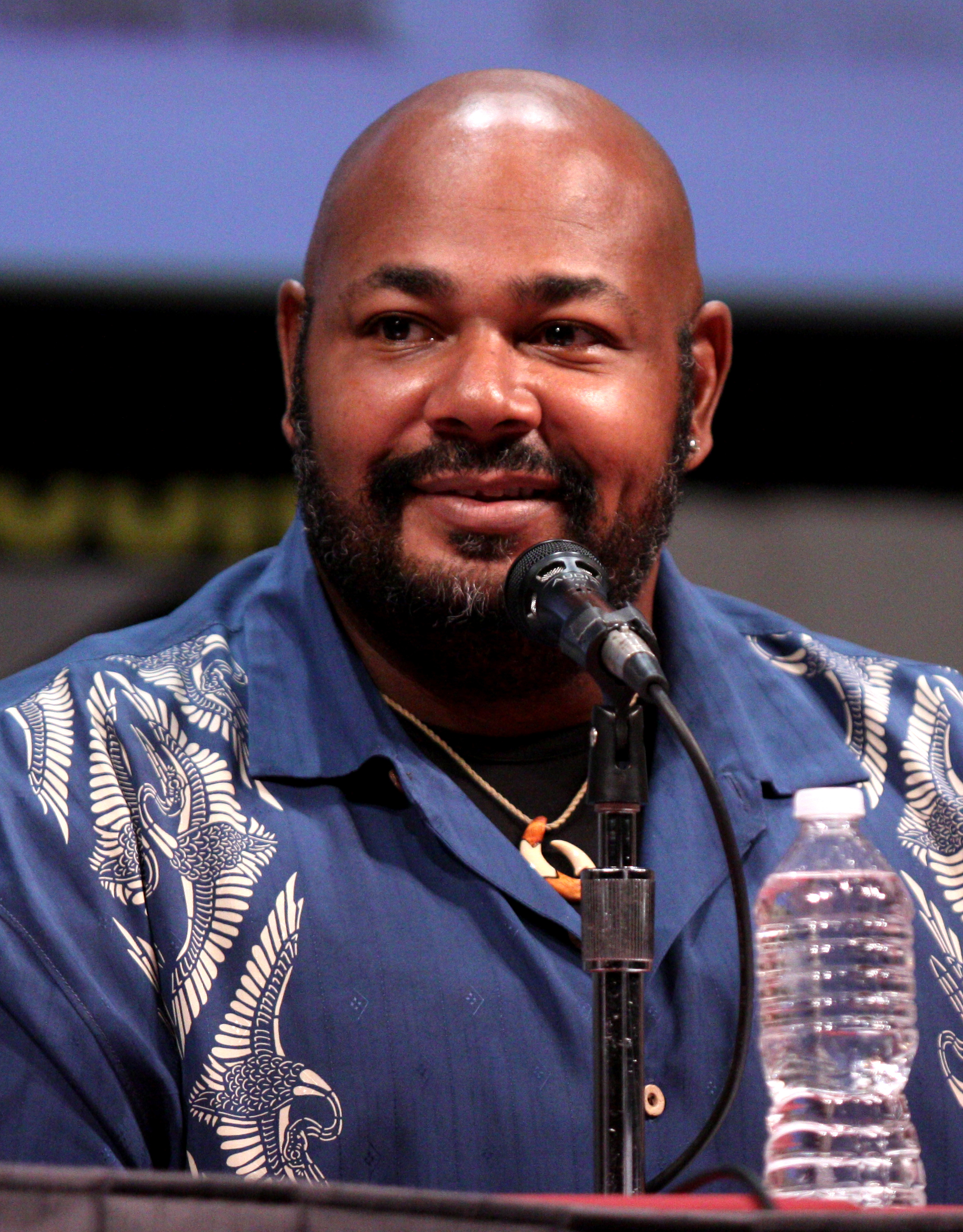
Kevin Michael Richardson provided the voice for Jerome.

Several new characters were introduced in season eight. The character of Jerome—Peter, Joe and Quagmire's official, yet temporary replacement for Cleveland Brown, who left the series to star in his own spin-off entitled The Cleveland Show—was introduced in the episode "Jerome is the New Black". He was voiced by The Cleveland Show cast member Kevin Michael Richardson. Quagmire's dad, Dan Quagmire, later renamed Ida after undergoing sex reassignment surgery, was also introduced, and voiced by series creator Seth MacFarlane, as well as Quagmire's daughter, named Anna Lee, voiced by Mae Whitman. Other guest stars who made multiple appearances as recurring characters from previous seasons were Carrie Fisher as Peter's boss Angela and Mike Henry as Cleveland Brown, who briefly returned in "The Splendid Source".

During the sixth season, episodes of Family Guy were delayed from regular broadcast due to the 2007–2008 Writers Guild of America strike. Series creator and executive producer Seth MacFarlane sided with the Writers Guild and participated in the strike until its conclusion. Because of this the seventh season consisted entirely of hold-overs. "Road to the Multiverse" was the first episode to be produced and aired after the strike ended. The season was originally gonna feature the series' 150th official episode, entitled "Brian & Stewie" but was aired as episode 143, which broke from the show's usual reliance on cutaways and cultural references and featured only Brian and Stewie trapped together in a vault. The season included a banned episode, entitled "Partial Terms of Endearment" for the first time since season three's "When You Wish Upon a Weinstein." The episode centered on Lois becoming a surrogate mother and being conflicted over whether or not to abort her best friend's baby, after her best friend dies. The episode was independently released on DVD on September 28, 2010, shortly after the ninth season premiere of Family Guy.

== Reception ==
The eighth-season premiere received a 5.2 rating share in the Nielsen ratings among viewers age 18 to 49, attracting 10.17 million viewers overall, the highest rated episode of the season. Both of these figures were significantly higher than those of the seventh-season finale. In the weeks following "Road to the Multiverse", viewership ratings hovered around 7 million. Aside from the premiere, "Family Goy", the second episode for the season, garnered the most views with 9.66 million, a high for the remainder of the eighth season. The episode "Dial Meg for Murder" received the fewest viewers for the season with 6.21 million viewers.

Episodes of the eighth season were nominated for and won several awards. On July 8, 2010, the song entitled "Down Syndrome Girl" from "Extra Large Medium" was nominated for a Primetime Emmy Award for Outstanding Music and Lyrics at the 62nd Primetime Emmy Awards. Series creator Seth MacFarlane and composer Walter Murphy were nominated for their work on the song's lyrics and music. On July 24, 2010, MacFarlane gave a live performance of the song at San Diego Comic-Con, to an audience of nearly 4,200 attendees. At the Creative Arts Awards on August 21, 2010, "Down Syndrome Girl" lost to the USA Network series Monk. Greg Colton, director of "Road to the Multiverse", was awarded the Primetime Emmy Award for Outstanding Individual Achievement in Animation for storyboarding the episode. In February 2010, "Dog Gone" won the Sid Caesar Comedy Award, at the annual Genesis Awards, for television comedy.

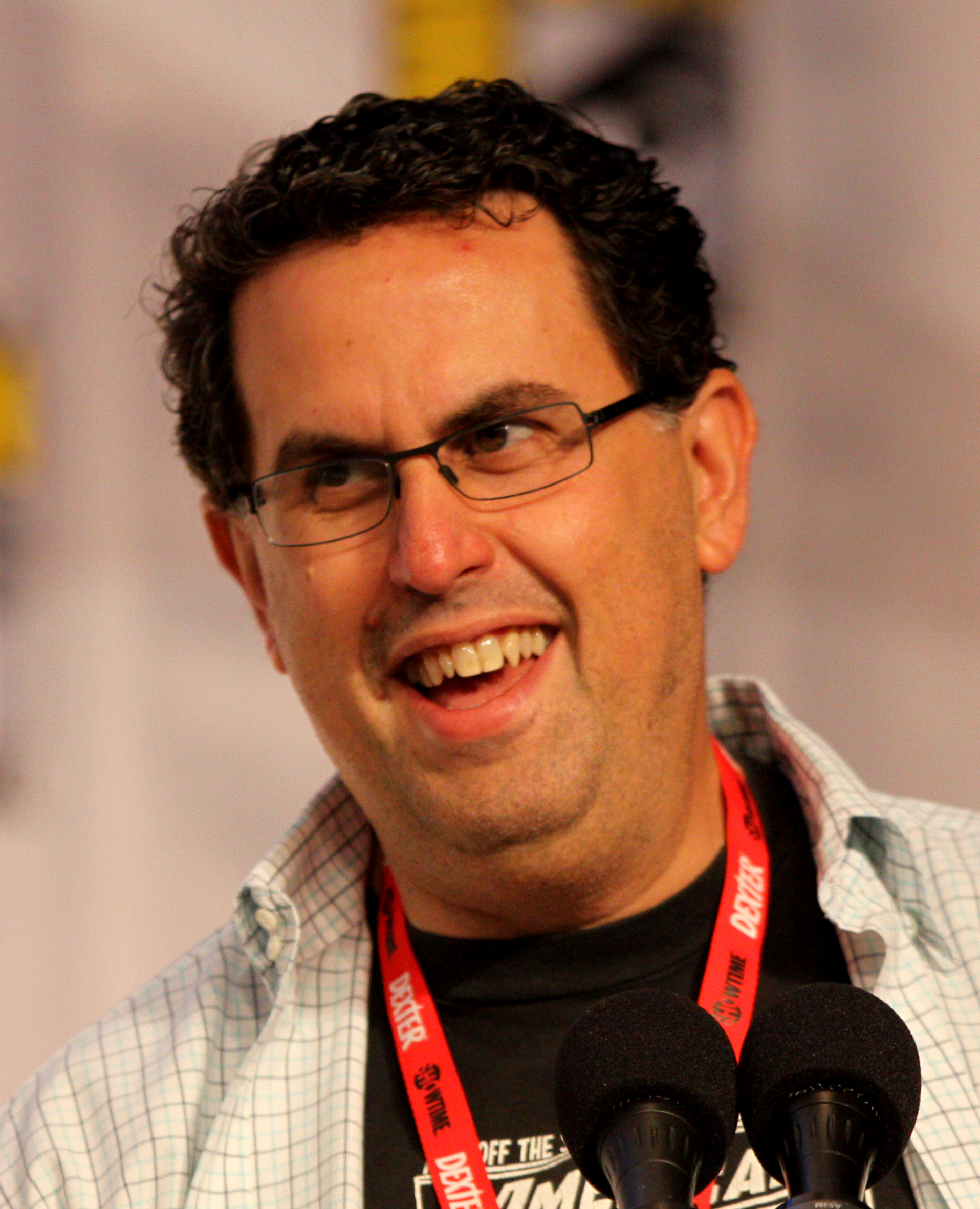
Executive producer David A. Goodman responded to criticism by the PTC.

The Parents Television Council, a frequent critic of Family Guy, branded "Family Goy", "Dial Meg for Murder", "Extra Large Medium", "Go Stewie Go", "Brian & Stewie" and "Quagmire's Dad" as the "worst show of the week," a title frequently given to the series by the group. In response to the group's criticism, executive producer David Goodman claimed that Family Guy is "absolutely for adults", and that he does not allow his own children to watch the show.

The season received mixed reviews from critics. Ramsey Isler of IGN wrote mixed comments about the season, saying, "There was a time when [Family Guy] was one of the funniest shows on TV; it was comedy gold. But somewhere along the line, the show's shine faded, its image was tarnished, and the magic disappeared", but added, "That's not to say that FG hasn't been good at all lately. Season 8 certainly had a few good episodes including the season opener, "Road to the Multiverse", which had a clever premise that was executed well. But after the first episode, the quality of the stories started to decline". He listed "Brian's Got a Brand New Bag", "Jerome Is the New Black", "Go Stewie Go", "Peter-assment" and "April in Quahog" as the worst episodes of the season. Isler praised the "tail end of the season", however, citing "Brian & Stewie" as "one of the better efforts the show has ever put out." In his review for the Family Guy volume eight DVD, Frank Rizzo of DVD Talk said, "The episodes stand on their own, whether you care about the dependence on easy gags and gimmicky concepts or not, because they are simply funny." Rizzo commented on the DVD release: "Fans of Family Guy, or any of MacFarlane's series for that matter, have to be concerned that the very reason the series continues to air, the DVDs the fans buy, are getting diluted and weakened, especially when you're getting less extras, less MacFarlane, and, for the first time, less of the commentaries that give you a peek into the show's creation.".

== Home media release ==
The remaining episodes of the seventh season and the first eight episodes of the eighth season were released on DVD as Volume Eight by 20th Century Fox in the United States and Canada on June 15, 2010. The DVD release features bonus material including two featurettes, "Road to "Road to the Multiverse"" and "Family Guy Sings-A-Long Karaoke", along with audio commentaries and deleted scenes.

Family Guy Volume Eight / Season 7 & 8
Set details			Special features
15 episodes; 3-disc set; 1.33:1 aspect ratio; Languages: English (Dolby Digital 5.1, with subtitles); Spanish (Dolby Digital, with subtitles); French (Dolby Digital, with subtitles)			Optional commentary; Deleted/extended scenes; "Road to the Multiverse" featurette; Family Guy Karaoke
Release dates			Optional commentary; Deleted/extended scenes; "Road to the Multiverse" featurette; Family Guy Karaoke
Region 1	Region 2	Region 4	Optional commentary; Deleted/extended scenes; "Road to the Multiverse" featurette; Family Guy Karaoke
June 15, 2010	November 1, 2010	August 17, 2010	Optional commentary; Deleted/extended scenes; "Road to the Multiverse" featurette; Family Guy Karaoke

Family Guy Volume Nine / Season 8 & 9
Set details			Special features
14 episodes; 3-disc set; 1.33:1 aspect ratio (first 11 episodes)/Widescreen: 1.78:1 ratio video (last 3 episodes); Languages: English (Dolby Digital 5.1, with subtitles); Spanish (Dolby Digital, with subtitles); French (Dolby Digital, with subtitles)			Optional commentary; Deleted/extended scenes; Animatics for three episodes; "And Then There Were Fewer" featurette; "Brian & Stewie: The Lost Phone Call" featurette; "The History of the World According to Family Guy" featurette; Family Guy panel at the 2010 San Diego Comic-Con
Release dates			Optional commentary; Deleted/extended scenes; Animatics for three episodes; "And Then There Were Fewer" featurette; "Brian & Stewie: The Lost Phone Call" featurette; "The History of the World According to Family Guy" featurette; Family Guy panel at the 2010 San Diego Comic-Con
Region 1	Region 2	Region 4	Optional commentary; Deleted/extended scenes; Animatics for three episodes; "And Then There Were Fewer" featurette; "Brian & Stewie: The Lost Phone Call" featurette; "The History of the World According to Family Guy" featurette; Family Guy panel at the 2010 San Diego Comic-Con
December 13, 2011	May 9, 2011	June 15, 2011	Optional commentary; Deleted/extended scenes; Animatics for three episodes; "And Then There Were Fewer" featurette; "Brian & Stewie: The Lost Phone Call" featurette; "The History of the World According to Family Guy" featurette; Family Guy panel at the 2010 San Diego Comic-Con
