= Dog Gone =

- Family Guy episode
- Episode no.: Season 8 Episode 8
- Directed by: Julius Wu
- Written by: Steve Callaghan
- Production code: 7ACX07
- Original air date: November 29, 2009

Guest appearances
- Chris Matthews as himself; Fred Tatasciore as Kurtwood Smith; Eddie Sotelo as Mikey; Kel MacFarlane as NPR Dog Owner; Nathan Gunn as Italian opera singer

Episode chronology
← Previous "Jerome Is the New Black"	Next → "Business Guy"
- Family Guy season 8

"Dog Gone" is the eighth episode of the eighth season of the animated comedy series Family Guy. It originally aired on Fox in the United States on November 29, 2009. The episode features Brian, the family pet, attempting to prove that a dog's life is just as important as that of a human, after he accidentally kills another dog with no consequences. Meanwhile, the Griffin family hires Consuela, a stereotypical Hispanic woman, as the household maid, which they each end up regretting once she takes advantage of the family's home.

First announced at the 2009 San Diego Comic-Con, the episode was written by series showrunner Steve Callaghan and directed by Julius Wu. It received high praise from critics for its storyline and many cultural references, but did received some criticism from PETA. According to Nielsen ratings, it was viewed in 8.48 million homes in its original airing. The episode featured guest performances by Chris Matthews, Nathan Gunn, Eddie Sotelo, Fred Tatasciore, and Kel MacFarlane, along with several recurring guest voice actors for the series. "Dog Gone" was released on DVD along with seven other episodes from the season on June 15, 2010.

== Plot ==
Brian receives an invitation to an award ceremony celebrating his novel, Faster Than the Speed of Love, by the Rhode Island Society for Special Literary Excellence. Convinced he is a great writer, Brian attempts to gain the family's interest, but they callously disregard him. Once he arrives at the "award ceremony", however, he discovers that he has misunderstood the meaning of the word "special", prompting him to drown his sorrows at the local bar and realize that he is not a good writer. He drives home drunk that night and accidentally runs over and kills a dog. He secretly buries the dead dog's body outside the Griffins' home and tries to keep quiet about it. Stewie, having witnessed his deed, begins to toy with Brian's guilt, eventually driving him to a state where he decides to confess to the "murder". However, when he confesses to Joe and the Griffin family, they all laugh, saying that no one cares if a dog or any other animal is killed, especially by another animal.

Outraged, Brian starts a support group, and decides to call it "The Quahog Animal Equal Rights League", to convince the town that the lives of animals should be of equal value to humans'. As the town citizens learn more about it, however, none of them are keen on changing their lifestyles if it means no processed meats and medical research on animals, and even become interested in how dogs taste after Brian mentions they are eaten in some cultures. Refusing to listen any further, they chase after Brian in an attempt to eat him.

Brian realizes that if no one cares about the lives of animals, then he is worthless to the Griffin family and everyone else. Stewie finds Brian crying in the bathtub, and, seeing how upset Brian is and feeling sorry for him, Stewie successfully fakes his death by putting his collar (which Brian hadn't been wearing) on a stray and killing it in a liquor store fire. The Griffins are devastated upon learning about Brian's supposed death, and realize how close a friend he was to them. Seeing this, Stewie rushes upstairs to show Brian how much the Griffins still care about him, regardless of his species. Brian then realizes his life does have a purpose and thanks Stewie for helping him, and decides to remain hidden to let the Griffins grieve a little longer.

Meanwhile, Quagmire accidentally knocks over a carton of Kool-Aid mix on the kitchen floor of the Griffin's house and leaves Peter to take the blame. Frustrated with having to clean Peter's messes, Lois hires a Hispanic maid named Consuela to clean their house. Consuela quickly proves to be very stubborn, refusing to leave after her work hours and sleeping at the Griffins' house overnight, much to Peter and Lois' annoyance. They try to fire her and even bribe her to leave, but she still refuses (though she takes the money they offer her anyway). In a last-ditch attempt, Peter finally gets rid of her by tricking her into inhaling chloroform on a handkerchief, and leaves her in a basket on Joe's front porch.

At the end, Peter lets the viewers know that everyone at Family Guy respects all living beings and assures the viewers that no animals were harmed in the making of the episode, but they are going hurt the feelings of an Italian opera singer by prematurely dropping the curtain on his performance – this is then shown onscreen.

== Production and development ==
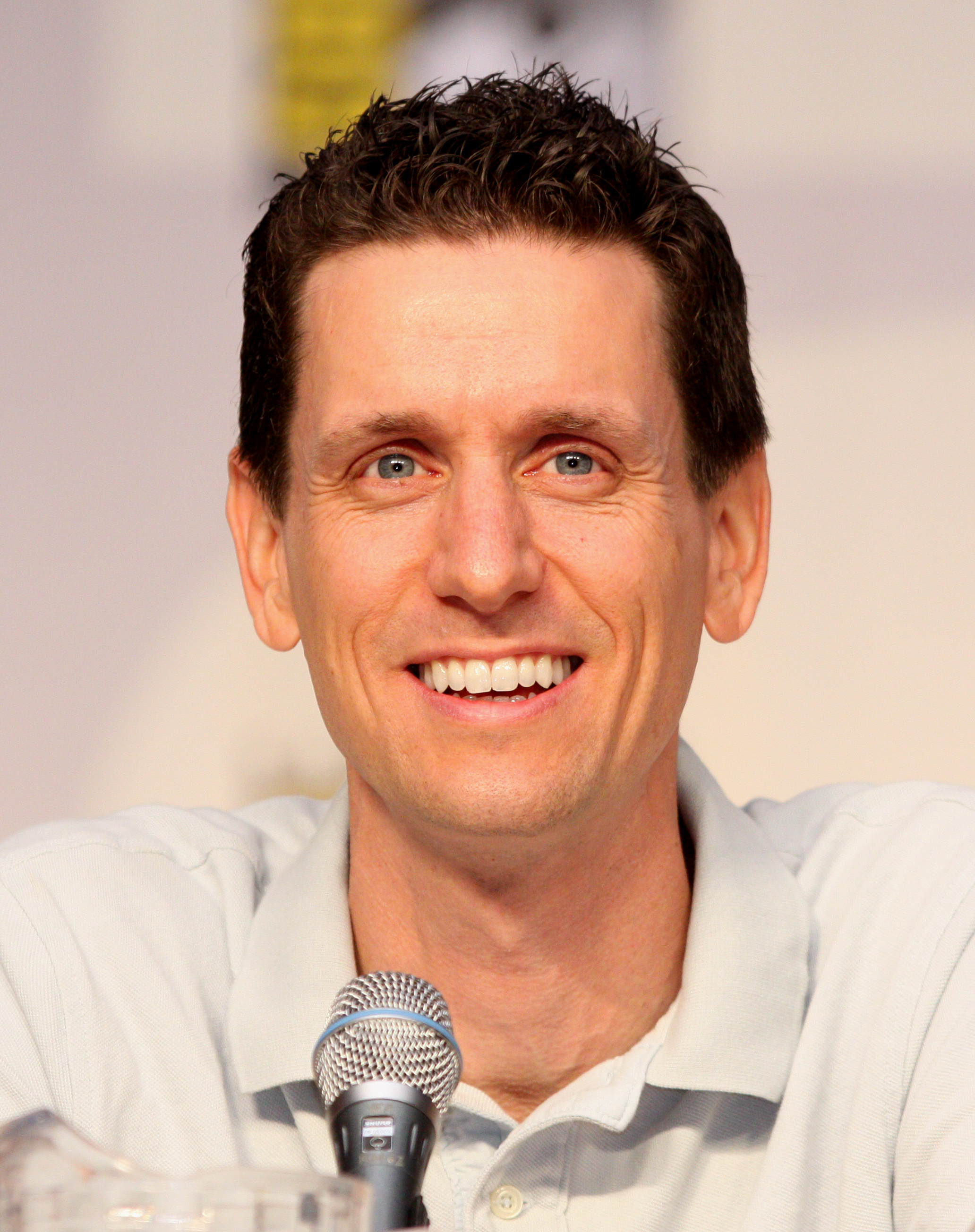
Steve Callaghan wrote the episode.

First announced at the 2009 San Diego Comic-Con in San Diego, California on July 25, 2009, by future showrunner Steve Callaghan, the episode was directed by series regular, and former King of the Hill and The Oblongs director, Julius Wu, and written by Callaghan before the conclusion of the eighth production season. The episode saw the reintroduction of the recurring character Consuela, a Hispanic maid whose first appearance was in the sixth season episode "Believe It or Not, Joe's Walking on Air". The character is voiced by main cast member Mike Henry.

"Dog Gone", along with seven other episodes from Family Guy's eighth season, was released on a three-disc DVD set in the United States on June 15, 2010. The sets included brief audio commentaries by Seth MacFarlane and various crew and cast members for several episodes, a collection of deleted scenes, a special mini-feature which discussed the process behind animating "Road to the Multiverse", and a mini-feature entitled Family Guy Karaoke.

In addition to the regular cast, anchor and political commentator Chris Matthews, voice actor Fred Tatasciore, opera singer Nathan Gunn, radio personality Eddie Sotelo and Kel MacFarlane, webmaster of the Seth MacFarlane fan site, guest starred in the episode. Recurring guest voice actors Ralph Garman, writer John Viener, writer Mark Hentemann, actress Alexandra Breckenridge, writer Alec Sulkin and writer Danny Smith also made minor appearances.

== Cultural references ==
In the opening scene of the episode, Stewie is seen going through Brian's internet history, which includes searches about himself on the internet search engine Google. Later, after going to the bar to drink, Brian talks to Bill, the father from The Family Circus syndicated comic strip. After Bill tells him he should have tried harder on writing his book, Brian responds by yelling that all Bill does is "judge" other people, and demands for him to go home and "fuck [his] wife in the face", to which Bill agrees. This is also later recognized by Peter the next day, when he is seen reading the funnies, and murmurs to himself, "this is a very shocking Family Circus."

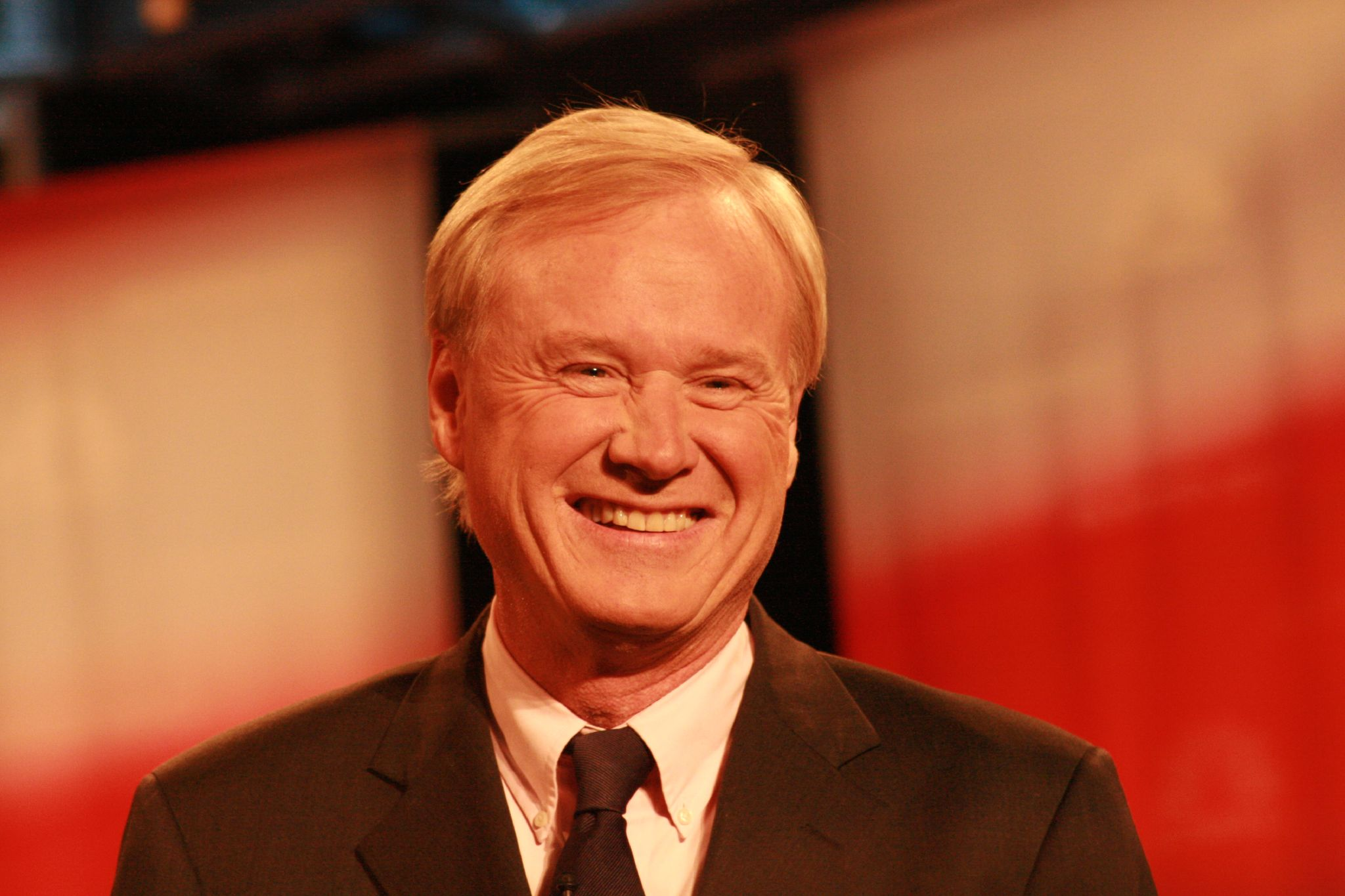
News anchor Chris Matthews made his first guest appearance in the series.

News anchor and political commentator Chris Matthews' show entitled Hardball with Chris Matthews is referenced by Stewie when he suggests Brian is getting a big head, with the guest, United States Senator Harry Reid, then appearing on Matthews' forehead, suggesting Matthews is self-centered. After Reid continues to interrupt him, however, Matthews cuts to actor Kurtwood Smith, in which Matthews appears on Smith's forehead instead.

Once Consuela is hired as the family maid, she first begins to annoy Peter by listening to stereotypical Latin music played loudly on a portable radio, in which the singer repeats the Spanish phrase "¡Muchos horn-os!" which literally translates to "many ovens" but within the context of the show is actually meant to be Spanglish for "many horns". In Consuela's final appearance in the episode, she is seen watching a commercial, which parodies local commercials urging viewers to hire a lawyer if they are in a car accident.

In an attempt to try to prove that an animal has the same rights as humans, Brian starts an advocacy group, and is suggested by Lois to join PETA, but she is unable to enunciate the word differently from how she pronounces "Peter", leading her husband to become confused. The end of the gag has Chris stating his belief that Betty White is "in PETA", with his wording prompting Peter to yell, "That doesn't even make sense!" Brian goes on to create a public service announcement regarding animal rights, one of which involves a dog being "tortured" by having to listen to the radio show All Things Considered on National Public Radio, which the dog's owner leaves on for him before leaving the house.

== Reception ==
In an improvement over the previous four episodes, the episode was viewed in 8.48 million homes in its original airing, according to Nielsen ratings, despite airing simultaneously with Sunday Night Football, the television movie A Dog Named Christmas on CBS and Desperate Housewives on ABC. The episode also acquired a 4.4 rating in the 18–49 demographic, beating The Simpsons, The Cleveland Show and American Dad!, but was ultimately edged out slightly by The Simpsons in total viewership.

Reviews of the episode were highly positive, citing the Brian and Stewie storyline as a "solid attempt to tell a good story," and the Consuela scenes as "terrific." Ahsan Haque of IGN also noted that "the writers deserved some credit" for the episode, saying that, in comparison to past episodes the episode did not "come across as a haphazardly assembled string of [random] jokes." Jason Hughes of TV Squad also found the Consuela scenes to be "hilarious," but found the final scene to be "strangely [...] uncomfortable," expecting Meg to be pushed out of the family hug. Emily VanDerWerff of The A.V. Club praised the handling of Brian's character in the episode, and called the Peter and PETA gag "pretty cheap, but quite funny," giving the episode a B rating overall.

In February 2010, for "rais[ing] public awareness of animal issues", "Dog Gone" won a Genesis Award for television comedy, winning over South Park episode "Whale Whores" and Monk episode "Mr. Monk and the Dog". In a post on PETA's official blog, Amanda Schinke, however, was highly critical of the episode for its "myriad of violent deaths of cartoon dogs." In addition, she called for the show to "hire [writers] who can generate material that doesn't make us roll our eyes."
