= Big Man on Hippocampus =

- Family Guy episode
- Episode no.: Season 8 Episode 10
- Directed by: Dominic Bianchi
- Written by: Brian Scully
- Production code: 7ACX09
- Original air date: January 3, 2010

Guest appearances
- Dwayne Johnson as himself (live action), Adrianne Palicki as Tiffani Thiessen, and Rick Pasqualone

Episode chronology
← Previous "Business Guy"	Next → "Dial Meg for Murder"
- Family Guy season 8

"Big Man on Hippocampus" is the tenth episode of the eighth season of the American animated sitcom Family Guy. It originally aired on Fox in the United States on January 3, 2010. The episode features Peter after he suddenly begins suffering from amnesia, and can no longer remember anything about his life, including his own family and friends. His wife, Lois, attempts to reintroduce Peter to his surroundings, but he soon discovers partying, and having sex with other women is much more entertaining. Frustrated, Lois decides to leave her husband, causing her neighbor, Quagmire, to attempt to win her over.

The episode was written by Brian Scully and directed by Dominic Bianchi. It received generally negative reviews from critics, despite its "promising start," as well as its many cultural references. According to the Nielsen ratings, it was viewed in 8.1 million homes in its original airing. The episode featured guest performances by Dwayne Johnson, Adrianne Palicki, and Rick Pasqualone, along with several recurring guest voice actors for the series. "Big Man on Hippocampus" was released on DVD along with ten other episodes from the season on December 13, 2011.

== Plot ==
The episode opens with the Griffin family watching television. A commercial for local auditions of the syndicated game show Family Feud is shown, prompting them to try out the next day. The Griffins are chosen for the show and reach the final round. During a fight with Richard Dawson about welching on the prize money, Dawson shoves Peter into the podium, causing him to hit his head. This causes him to forget everything about his life, including his family and friends. Lois tries to jog his memory by reintroducing him to his old self, including his children and his sex life. Unfortunately, this causes Peter to believe that he's free to have sexual relations with others in his newfound "bachelorhood." That night, Peter enters the master bedroom and tells Lois to move over to have sex with another woman. Deeply angered, Lois decides to move out to a low-budget apartment and taking the children with her. When Quagmire finds out, he jumps on the opportunity to pursue a relationship with Lois.

When Brian returns home to warn Peter about the consequences of this development, Peter reveals that he had regained his memory after Ernie the Giant Chicken hit him on the head with "an odd number of objects" earlier that day. Alerted by Brian's warnings, Peter rushes to reclaim Lois, just as Quagmire's plans had been delayed by impotence when Lois confessed that she "trusts" him. Peter then professes his love for her, and desire to be with her for the rest of his life, causing Lois to love him again. The two walk home, happy in their reunion, leaving Quagmire as he frustratedly attempts increasingly drastic measures to "resuscitate" his genitalia using: a penis pump, intravenous therapy, and a crash cart with a defibrillator in his closet.

== Production and development ==
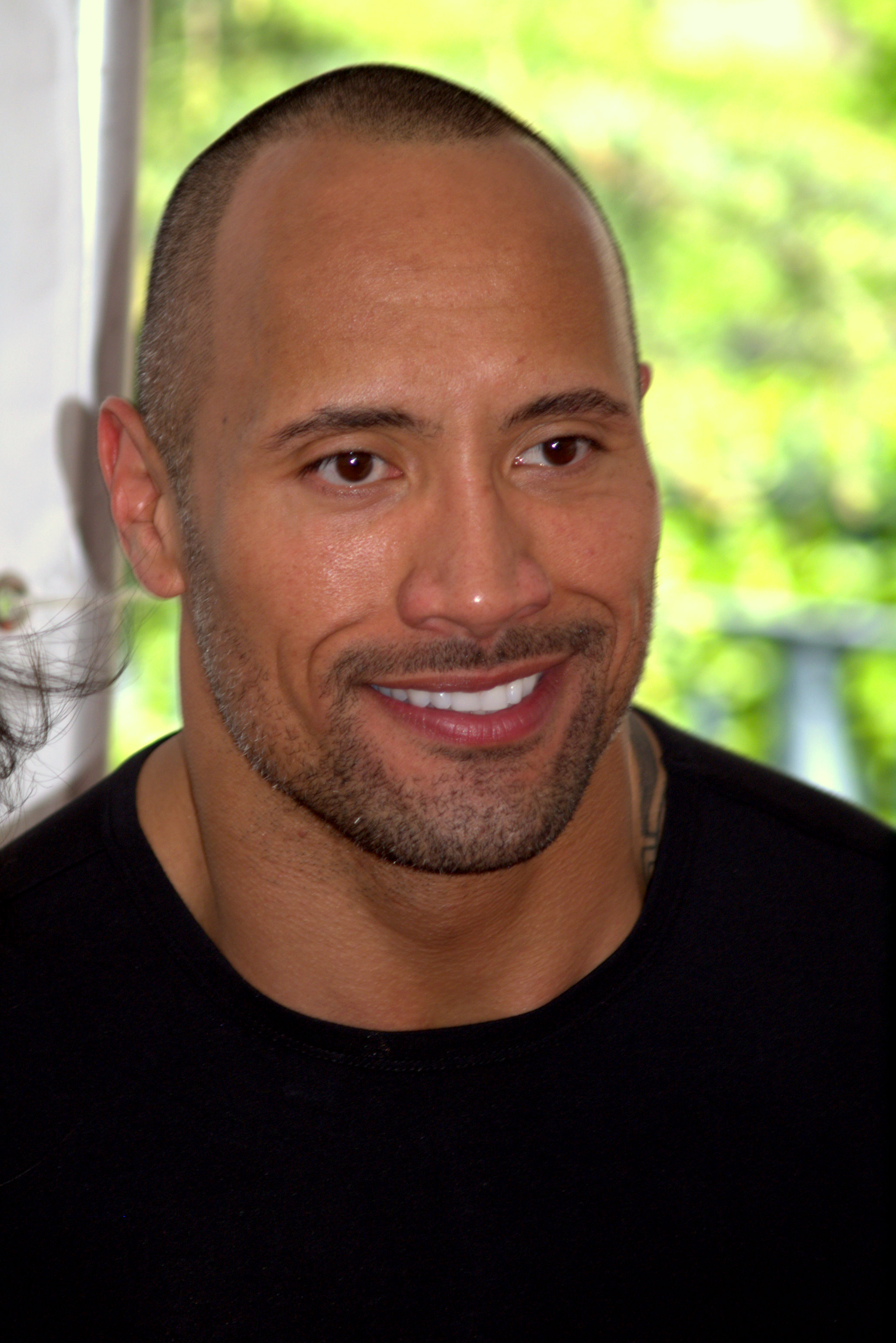
Dwayne Johnson guest starred in the episode.

This episode was written by Brian Scully, older brother of long-time Simpsons writer and producer Mike Scully. This was his second Family Guy episode, the first being "I Dream of Jesus" from the seventh season. Series regular Dominic Bianchi directed the episode, before the conclusion of the eighth production season.

"Big Man on Hippocampus", along with the eleven other episodes from Family Guy's eighth season, was released on a three-disc DVD set in the United States on December 13, 2011. The sets include brief audio commentaries by various crew and cast members for several episodes, a collection of deleted scenes and animatics, a special mini-feature which discussed the process behind animating "And Then There Were Fewer", a mini-feature entitled "The Comical Adventures of Family Guy – Brian & Stewie: The Lost Phone Call", and footage of the Family Guy panel at the 2010 San Diego Comic-Con.

In addition to the regular cast, actor Dwayne Johnson made a brief live-action appearance in the episode, appearing as himself, along with two action figures of Peter and Lois, which he proceeds to bang on top of each other in order to illustrate a censored sex scene. Commenting on his appearance in the episode, Johnson stated that he was a "big fan" of Family Guy, having quickly befriended show creator Seth MacFarlane after he had a minor role in Johnson's 2010 film Tooth Fairy. While filming the movie, Johnson had reached out to MacFarlane, saying that he would love to "return the favor" by appearing on Family Guy, which eventually led to his role in this episode. Actress Adrianne Palicki and voice actor Rick Pasqualone also guest starred in the episode. Recurring guest voice actors Alexandra Breckenridge and Ralph Garman, along with writers Steve Callaghan, Mark Hentemann, Danny Smith, Alec Sulkin and John Viener, also made minor appearances. Actors Patrick Warburton and Adam West made appearances as well.

== Cultural references ==
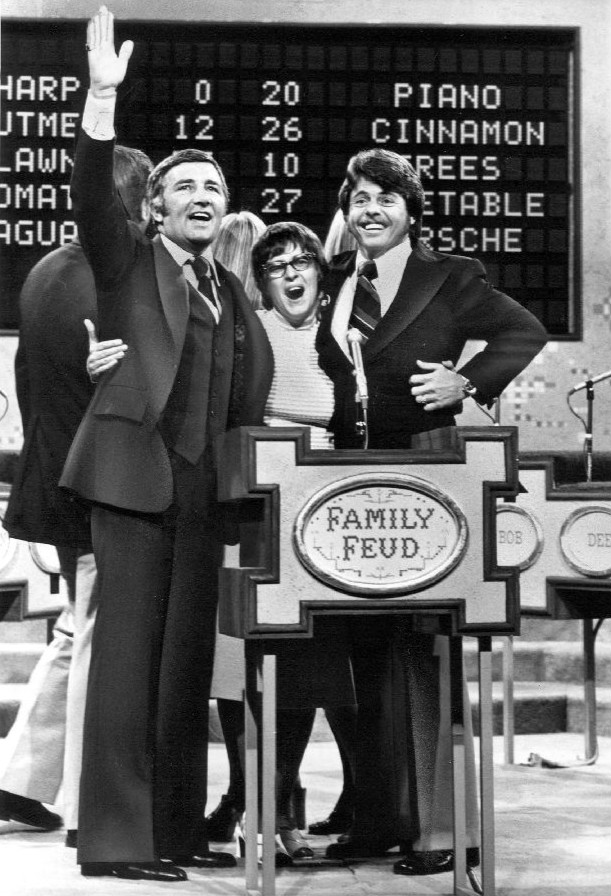
The Griffins compete on Family Feud and meet host Richard Dawson

The episode contains numerous in-jokes and references to other events. As the episode opens, the family sees an announcement about auditions for the game show Family Feud. Deciding to try out, the family is quickly chosen, along with the family of show writer Steve Callaghan. The segment features a re-creation of the game show's original 1976 set and rules, including host Richard Dawson's practice of kissing the female contestants. As an answer to one of the questions, Peter supplies "the flute that Captain Picard played, first in his imagination, and then in real life, in the episode "The Inner Light" from Star Trek: The Next Generation" (which ironically had sold for $48,000 at a Christie's auction in 2006). Then, during the Fast Money round, when Lois was asked to name a favorite holiday, Stewie answered 9/11.

When Peter is introduced to Meg, he exclaims "D'oh!", to which Lois replies "No, Peter, that's not your catchphrase", an allusion to Homer Simpson in The Simpsons. Stewie introduces himself and Brian as Tomax and Xamot respectively and tells Peter they are twins who can feel each other's pain, which is a reference to these characters from the G.I. Joe franchise. In a further attempt to restore Peter's memory, Lois decides to show Peter footage of their honeymoon, which is reminiscent of the Corona commercials with its scene of a bottle of beer placed between the couple, as they are both sitting on a beach. Going on to teach Peter how to drive, Lois gives him a copy of the video game Grand Theft Auto. As a result, he kills a prostitute with a baseball bat, steals her money then steals a car, in a parody of the actions the player is allowed to perform in the game itself. Peter also rediscovers "Surfin' Bird" by The Trashmen and sings to it while dancing, annoying the family. The Griffins had been previously tormented by it in the seventh season episode "I Dream of Jesus", which the writer of the episode, Brian Scully, also wrote.

At the end of the first act, when Brian says "Oh No", (in place of the commercial interlude from Night Rider) a series of white on black text is shown mocking the apparently tired use of an amnesiac storyline as well as Fox's censorship in the style of bumpers featured on Cartoon Network's programming block Adult Swim, whose airing of Family Guy contributed to its revival. In exchange for having the Adult Swim logo shown in the episode, the bumpers were replaced by similar alternatives featuring Fox's own Animation Domination block during its first airing on Adult Swim.

Paul Hogan from "Crocodile" Dundee makes an appearance when Lois is teaching Peter how to use silverware. She says "this is a knife" saying his machete is a knife, referencing a famous scene from the film.

Returning home from a night out, Peter brings home Tiffani Thiessen from Saved by the Bell, naively thinking he is allowed to have sex with her. The reference is made clear when Peter asks her if she bought a necklace using her money from the show. Tiffani also tells Peter he need not worry about her conceiving, as she is "already pregnant." In real life, Thiessen was expecting her first child at the time. After Lois decides to leave Peter, she is shown shopping for groceries at the Quahog Market. Quagmire sneakingly approaches her from behind, saying his "giggity" catchphrase to the shark motif composed by John Williams for the 1975 film Jaws.

The title is a pun on the common phrase Big Man on Campus, but with campus changed to hippocampus, a reference to Peter's amnesia in the episode.

== Reception ==
The episode was viewed in 8.1 million homes, and received a Nielsen rating of 3.9/9 in the 18–49 demographic. In addition, it was also the second most viewed and second highest rated show on Fox's Animation Domination lineup, losing slightly to The Simpsons, but continued its lead over both The Cleveland Show and American Dad! in total viewership and ratings.

Reviews of the episode were negative, citing the storyline as "safe," "without any offensive jokes for the sake of being offensive." Ahsan Haque of IGN praised the "cohesive story" as "[succeeding] on its simplicity," but criticized the series for continuing to broadcast in the 4:3 format, as opposed to widescreen like MacFarlane's other two shows. Emily VanDerWerff of The A.V. Club reviewed the episode more negatively, however, criticizing the writers for using "storylines as a thin spine to hang jokes on," giving the episode a D rating. Jason Hughes of TV Squad commended the live-action sequence featuring Johnson, as well as the utilization of Meg's personality to create an awkward situation with the family. Despite the somewhat negative criticism, the episode still ended up on the most downloaded episodes list on iTunes 2010 Rewind.

Australian channel 7mate received criticism for airing the episode on 12 August 2014, 14 hours after the suicide of Robin Williams, who features in a cutaway implying that he is overrated. A spokesperson for the channel subsequently stated "it was a coincidence".
