= Quagmire's Dad =

- Family Guy episode
- Brian Griffin vomiting upon learning that he slept with Quagmire's father.
- Episode no.: Season 8 Episode 18
- Directed by: Pete Michels
- Written by: Tom Devanney
- Production code: 7ACX19
- Original air date: May 9, 2010

Guest appearance
- Wally Wingert as Wally

Episode chronology
| ← Previous "Brian & Stewie" | Next → "The Splendid Source" |
- Family Guy season 8

"Quagmire's Dad" is the 18th episode of the eighth season of the animated comedy series Family Guy. It originally aired on Fox in the United States on May 9, 2010. The episode features Quagmire after his father, Dan Quagmire, returns to the fictional city of Quahog and comes out as a trans woman. Dan has decided to have gender-affirming surgery and changes her name to Ida. Meanwhile, Brian travels to a seminar and, upon returning, has sex with Ida, who he does not realize is Quagmire's father.

The episode was written by Tom Devanney and directed by Pete Michels. It received generally negative reviews with most critics and audiences making comparisons between the episode and the 2007 film I Now Pronounce You Chuck & Larry, in addition to receiving some criticism for its portrayal of transgender identity, including from the Gay and Lesbian Alliance Against Defamation (GLAAD) and the Parents Television Council. According to Nielsen ratings, it was viewed in 7.22 million homes in its original airing. The episode featured a guest performance by Wally Wingert, along with several recurring guest voice actors for the series. "Quagmire's Dad" was released on DVD along with ten other episodes from the season on December 13, 2011.

== Plot ==
Peter and Joe visit Quagmire and are introduced to his father, Lieutenant Commander Dan Quagmire. Expecting to see the inspiration for Quagmire's sexual behavior, they are surprised by Dan's stereotypically gay mannerisms. The next morning, Quagmire invites Peter and Lois to the Naval Ball being held to honor his father, but soon begins arguing with Peter about his father's sexuality.

At the ball that night, members of the Navy bombard Quagmire with compliments about his war-hero father, most of which can be taken as double entendres about Dan's alleged homosexuality. Concerned that his dad might actually be gay, Quagmire confronts him and Dan explains that he is not gay, but is instead a woman trapped in a man's body and intends to undergo sex reassignment surgery during his stay in Quahog, much to Quagmire's dismay. The surgery is a success, with Dan emerging as "Ida Davis".

That night, Ida and Quagmire join the Griffins for dinner. As the dinner begins, however, Quagmire becomes frustrated when the Griffins turn the conversation towards Ida's operation, and storms out of the room. At Quagmire's home, Quagmire tells Ida that he is not sure he can deal with her new gender identity. Saddened, Ida leaves Quagmire's home and decides to stay at a nearby Marriott Hotel.

Meanwhile, Brian has been out of town attending a seminar on creating a web series and is unaware of what has happened. On his way home, Brian stops at the Marriott, meets Ida, and has a few drinks with her. Quickly bonding, they retire to Ida's room for sex.

The next morning, Brian shares his newfound love with Peter and Lois before showing them a picture of Ida on his cell phone. Peter and Lois go into hysterics, while Brian, still unaware of the whole story, dismisses them as jealous. After Stewie fills him in on the events that transpired in his absence, Brian is amused until Stewie informs him that Dan Quagmire's new name is Ida. Realizing that he has had sex with Quagmire's father, Brian vomits profusely for thirty seconds straight, and then he and Stewie begin panicking.

Ida returns to Quagmire's home and apologizes for not giving him the chance to take everything in before the operation, and Quagmire returns the favor, reconciling their relationship. Ida tells Quagmire that she met someone, and he is initially excited to know who it is. However, when she reveals it is Brian, whom Quagmire loathes, he becomes enraged.

Brian is traumatized after finding out about Ida and, when he hears Quagmire storming inside the house, he tries to hide under Peter and Lois' bed, but Quagmire finds him and brutally beats him up, before ordering him to stay away from his house and telling him to die. As Quagmire leaves, a badly injured Brian retaliates by telling him "Hey... I fucked your dad", before slamming the door shut.

== Production and development ==
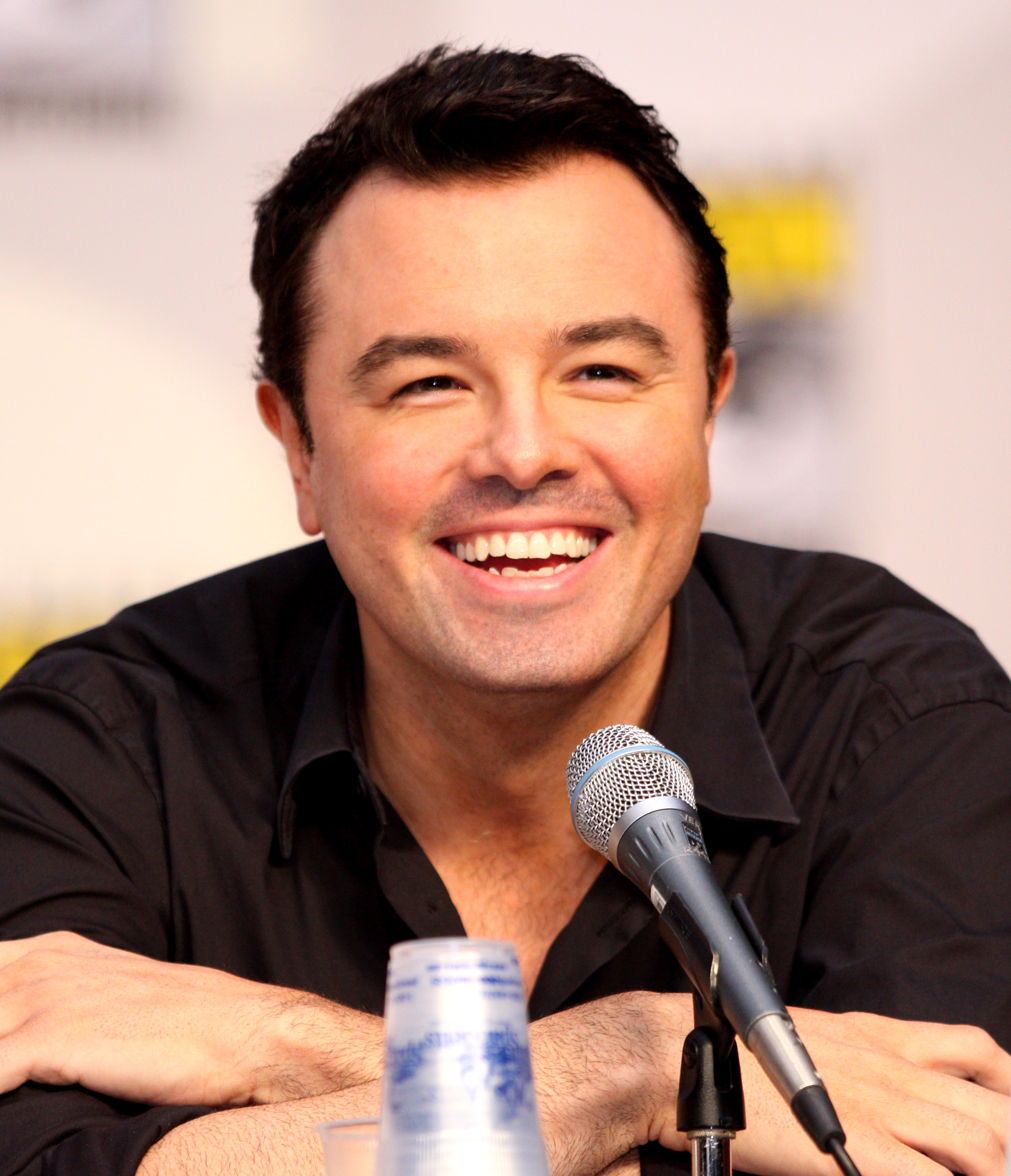
Seth MacFarlane provided the voice of Dan Quagmire and Ida Davis.

The episode was written by Tom Devanney and directed by series regular Pete Michels. It is the second episode of the season Devanney and Michels worked on, the first being "Brian's Got a Brand New Bag", before the conclusion of season 8. The episode saw the introduction of Quagmire's father, Lieutenant Commander Dan Quagmire, a former officer with the United States Navy who later becomes Ida Quagmire. The character was voiced by main cast member, series creator and executive producer Seth MacFarlane. Series regulars Peter Shin and James Purdum served as supervising directors, with Andrew Goldberg and Alex Carter working as staff writers for the episode. Composer Ron Jones, who has worked on the series since its inception, returned to compose the music for "Quagmire's Dad". The original design of Ida Quagmire was created by MacFarlane, and designed to resemble English actor Paul Bettany. It was later adapted upon by Pete Michels.

"Quagmire's Dad", along with the eleven other episodes from Family Guy's eighth season, was released on a three-disc DVD set in the United States on December 13, 2011. The sets include brief audio commentaries by various crew and cast members for several episodes, a collection of deleted scenes and animatics, a special mini-feature which discussed the process behind animating "And Then There Were Fewer", a mini-feature entitled "The Comical Adventures of Family Guy – Brian & Stewie: The Lost Phone Call", and footage of the Family Guy panel at the 2010 San Diego Comic-Con.

In addition to the regular cast, voice actor Wally Wingert guest starred in the episode. Recurring guest voice actor Ralph Garman, and writers Chris Sheridan, Danny Smith, Alec Sulkin and John Viener made minor appearances. Recurring guest voice actor Patrick Warburton reprises his role of Joe Swanson.

The bit of Peter and Joe texting each other exists in two versions: one with Peter texting Joe back but was autocorrected, or using the term "phoque" to describe how gay Quagmire's father is.

== Cultural references ==
After announcing that his father is being honored by the Navy, Quagmire says his father was his greatest hero growing up. Peter then claims that his own hero while growing up was DC Comics superhero Aquaman, in addition to his alter ego Arthur Curry. When Quagmire introduces his father to Peter and Joe, Nancy Sinatra's single "These Boots Are Made for Walkin'" begins playing on Quagmire's stereo while Dan Quagmire dances down the stairs. Upon emerging from her surgery, Ida asks what Quagmire and Peter think of the operation and Peter, as he had suggested to Quagmire during the surgery, sings the hit single "Walking on Sunshine" by Katrina and the Waves.

== Reception ==
In a slight decrease from the previous week, the episode was viewed in 7.22 million homes in its original airing, despite airing simultaneously with Desperate Housewives on ABC, Celebrity Apprentice on NBC, and the television film Jesse Stone: No Remorse on CBS. The episode also acquired a 3.8 rating in the 18–49 demographic, beating The Simpsons, The Cleveland Show and American Dad! in both ratings and total viewership.

Reviews of the episode were generally negative with most critics and audiences making comparisons between the episode and the 2007 film I Now Pronounce You Chuck & Larry. Ramsey Isler of IGN noted his enjoyment of Ida Quagmire's character traits: "I'll give the writing team credit for this little plot twist, as I'm sure we were all expecting the elder Quagmire to be even more of a womanizer than his son." Regarding the episode's treatment of LGBT issues, Jason Hughes of TV Squad stated, "there's a gold mine of material to dig into for satire and comedy; comedy which will likely offend as many people as the real issues do." Emily VanDerWerff of The A.V. Club noted, "the scenes where the mockery seemed a little too mean-spirited were definitely out of the show's worst sections of its toolkit". Tom Eames of entertainment website Digital Spy placed the episode at number ten on his listing of the best Family Guy episodes in order of "yukyukyuks" and praised Brian's line of 'Hey... I fucked your dad' after Quagmire attacks him, describing it as "amazing".

The episode was criticized for its portrayal of transgender people, particularly regarding the way Ida was treated by other characters. Food that Ida prepared for the dinner party at the Griffin house was thrown out and Brian's learning of her sex-reassignment surgery after he had sex with her caused him to "violently" vomit for 30 unbroken seconds. Speaking with LGBT media website AfterElton.com in January 2010, series creator Seth MacFarlane mentioned the episode in response to concerns over how his animated series have portrayed LGBT characters. "It always distresses me when I hear that the gay community is upset with us, because that's one group of people I hope would know we're on their side. I can safely say that the transsexual community will be very, very happy with the 'Quagmire' episode that we have coming up in a couple of months. It's probably the most sympathetic portrayal of a transsexual character that has ever been on television, dare I say." In a subsequent review, AfterElton.com writer Brent Hartinger graded the episode negatively. While noting that the episode deserves credit for making important points about transgender people, he found its inclusion of the vomiting scene and Lois and Peter's perceived transphobic remarks about Ida to be "shockingly insensitive". Hartinger continued, "Frankly, it's literally impossible for me to reconcile last night's episode with MacFarlane's words, unless I come to the conclusion that the man is pretty much a complete idiot." GLAAD, an LGBT media watchdog organization, released a statement about the episode, noting that "GLAAD shares the serious concerns being voiced from members of the community and GLAAD's Entertainment Media Team is addressing these with Fox. Next steps will be decided at that point." In a September 2010 interview in Details, MacFarlane expressed surprise at the negative reaction, stating "I don't meet a lot of stupid homosexuals." He repeated that he still felt Ida was a "very sympathetic portrayal of a transsexual character". He also defended Brian's vomiting after discovering he had sex with someone who had undergone sex reassignment surgery noting Brian's character is heterosexual and "If I found out that I had slept with a transsexual, I might throw up in the same way that a gay guy looks at a vagina and goes, 'Oh, my God, that's disgusting.'" Eames (Digital Spy) believed the episode was "surprisingly kind" to the transgender community for "Family Guy standards".

The Parents Television Council, a conservative campaigning group and frequent critic of MacFarlane's work, named "Quagmire's Dad" as its "Worst TV Show of the Week" citing Ida Quagmire's "outrageously stereotyped gay" character, violence and sexual innuendo. The PTC specifically cited the innuendo-laced dialogue throughout the episode, a "straight 30 straight seconds [sic]" of vomiting after Brian learns of Ida's previous identity, Quagmire's erection while embracing Ida and the violence of the final scene.

== See also ==
- I Now Pronounce You Chuck & Larry
- "A Brown Thanksgiving" — another episode of a Seth MacFarlane series (The Cleveland Show) that was criticized for its handling of a transgender character
- LGBTQ themes in Western animation
