= Business Guy =

- Family Guy episode
- Episode no.: Season 8 Episode 9
- Directed by: Pete Michels
- Written by: Andrew Goldberg; Alex Carter
- Production code: 7ACX11
- Original air date: December 13, 2009

Guest appearances
- Hugh Laurie as himself and Gregory House; Bobby Lee as Asian Employee; Nana Visitor as Various; Johnny Galecki as Leonard Hofstadter; Jim Parsons as Sheldon Cooper; Nickie Bryar

Episode chronology
← Previous "Dog Gone"	Next → "Big Man on Hippocampus"
- Family Guy season 8

"Business Guy" is the ninth episode in the eighth season of the American animated television series Family Guy. It originally aired on Fox in the United States on December 13, 2009. The episode centers on Peter as he assumes temporary control of his father-in-law Carter Pewterschmidt's billion-dollar empire after he suffers a heart attack and is in a coma. Peter immediately becomes power hungry, however, and develops several ridiculous items, prompting Lois and Carter, after he recovers from his coma, to try to trick him into relinquishing control of the company.

The episode was written by Andrew Goldberg and Alex Carter, and directed by Pete Michels. It received mixed reviews from critics for its storyline and many cultural references, in addition to receiving criticism from and being reported to the FCC by the Parents Television Council. According to Nielsen ratings, it was viewed in 7.67 million homes in its original airing. The episode featured guest performances by Hugh Laurie, Bobby Lee, Nana Visitor, Johnny Galecki and Jim Parsons, along with several recurring guest voice actors for the series. "Business Guy" was released on DVD along with ten other episodes from the season on December 13, 2011.

== Plot ==
The Griffins are invited onto the Pewterschmidts's yacht, where Lois becomes seasick and vomits. Peter is reminded of his bachelor party when this happens, and is shocked to find out that Carter has never had one and does not know what it is. Upon returning to Quahog, Peter takes him to a strip club to simulate a bachelor party. In his excitement, Carter suffers a heart attack and falls into a coma. Dr. House is hired to treat him, but he throws his rule book out the window and punches Carter in the face to ensure that he is comatose. Carter's video will is discovered, in which he gives Lois control of his billion-dollar manufacturing company, Pewterschmidt Industries, even though she does not know how to run a corporation. Peter, however, is inspired by House's "live-without-rules" regime and decides to control the company himself.

On his first day on the job, Peter dismisses the entire board of directors for being unable to keep up with his ideas and hires his friends to manufacture ridiculous items. Soon after, Carter reawakens from his coma and finds what Peter has done with his company. Carter confronts Peter in his former office and demands for him to relinquish control of the company, but he refuses; he instead forces him to work as a janitor, have and invite people to his mansion for a Big Bang Theory viewing party, pay a compliment to a sharply dressed Asian man, and clean out the fridge in the employee lounge.

Carter is embarrassed, so he and Lois trick Peter into surrendering the company by scaring him into believing a swamp monster will eat him if he does not. A seemingly real swamp monster scares Peter out of the office, chases Lois and a disguised Carter, before being found out as House.

In the end, Lois cheers Peter up by revealing that the contract he signed allows him to keep the corporate plane. Peter is delighted and jumps in a freeze frame shot, but he and his family grow alarmed when he actually remains in midair.

== Production and development ==
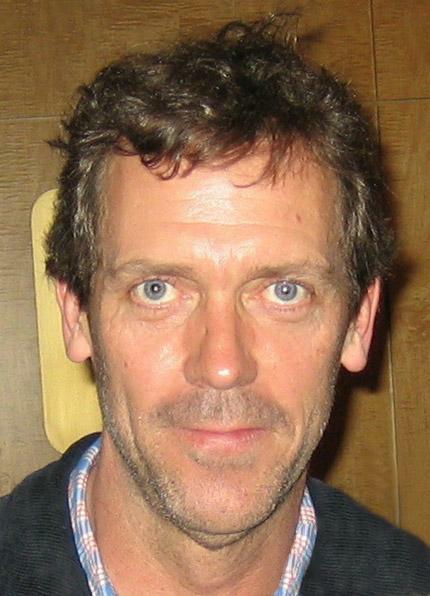
Hugh Laurie reprised his role as character Gregory House from the medical drama House.

The episode was co-written by Andrew Goldberg and Alex Carter, both having written episodes for the show previously. The episode was directed by series regular Pete Michels, before the conclusion of the eighth production season, in his second episode of the season. Series regulars Peter Shin and James Purdum served as supervising directors, with Andrew Goldberg and Alex Carter working as staff writers for the episode. Karin Perrotta was the associate producer of this episode, in her ninth episode of the season.

"Business Guy", along with the eleven other episodes from Family Guy's eighth season, was released on a three-disc DVD set in the United States on December 13, 2011. The sets include brief audio commentaries by various crew and cast members for several episodes, a collection of deleted scenes and animatics, a special mini-feature which discussed the process behind animating "And Then There Were Fewer", a mini-feature entitled "The Comical Adventures of Family Guy – Brian & Stewie: The Lost Phone Call", and footage of the Family Guy panel at the 2010 San Diego Comic-Con.

In addition to the regular cast, actor Hugh Laurie made his second appearance in the series, the first being "One If by Clam, Two If by Sea"; Laurie lampooned his role as House protagonist Gregory House. Actors Johnny Galecki and Jim Parsons reprised their roles as Leonard Hofstadter and Sheldon Cooper from The Big Bang Theory respectively. Bobby Lee of MADtv and Nana Visitor also guest star in the episode. Recurring guest voice actors Alexandra Breckenridge, Chris Cox, Ralph Garman, Danny Smith, Alec Sulkin and John Viener also made minor appearances. Actor Patrick Warburton appears in the episode as well.

== Cultural references ==
In the opening scene, Carter reveals that he has never had a bachelor party, leading Peter to profess that he will help solve Carter's dilemma, just as Hamburger Helper helped him. Peter is then introduced to the Hamburger Helper mascot Helping Hand, as well as his mentally challenged brother — Cheeseburger Helper — who insists on adding cheese to the meal. After taking Carter to the Quahog strip club, Peter decides to pay a mistress to give him a lapdance, causing Carter to suffer a heart attack from sexual arousal. This then prompts Quagmire to ask what is wrong with him, to which Carter replies that he is having "a heart attack-ack-ack-ack-ack-ack! You oughta know by now!," which is taken from a line in the Billy Joel song "Movin' Out (Anthony's Song)". The bedtime story that Peter refers to when talking to Lois about how she makes him sad is the "Story of Little Suck-a-Thumb" from the German children's book Struwwelpeter.

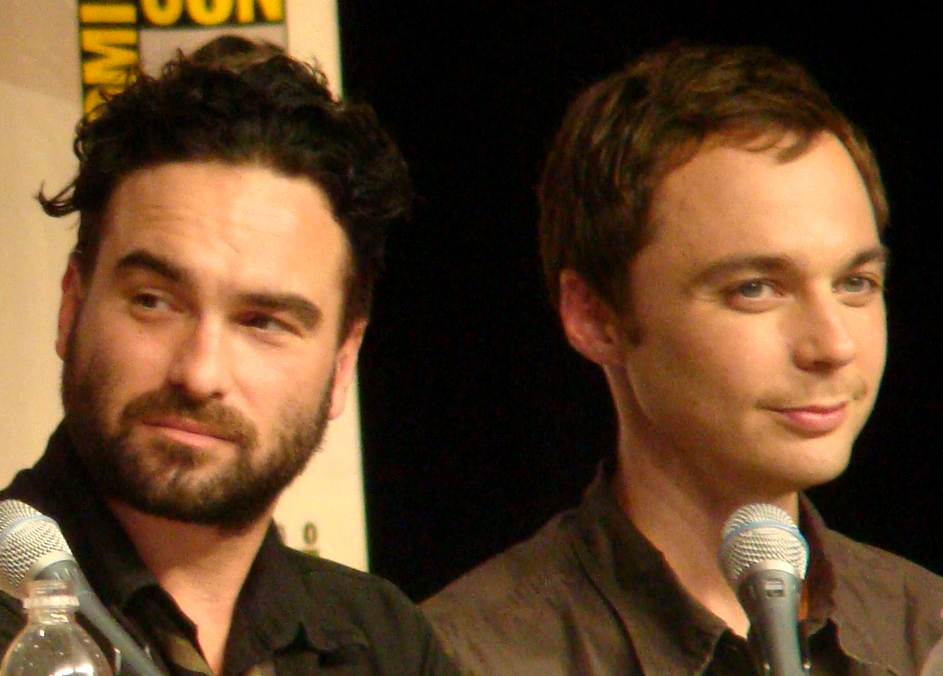
Johnny Galecki and Jim Parsons guest starred.

Returning home from firing the board of directors, Peter calls attention to Lacey Chabert, formerly the voice of Meg Griffin before being replaced by Mila Kunis, when he notes that he can also fire Lois for "misbehaving." In introducing new products for Pewterschmidt Industries, Peter decides to create several unorthodox items, which include a cereal line for Jeremy Irons entitled "Jeremy Irons Cereal," a "Scream in a Box," as well as an African American heart rate monitor, which Carter later uses at the hospital, with the system's two settings, Barry White, and Bill Cosby's impersonated voices.

Once Carter Pewterschmidt wakes up from his coma, Johnny Galecki and Jim Parsons appear as Leonard Hofstadter and Sheldon Cooper in the episode when Carter is forced by Peter to hold a viewing party for the CBS comedy sitcom The Big Bang Theory, which Carter is reluctant to do at first, but soon begins to enjoy the show. In an attempt to get the company back from Peter, Carter and Lois trick him into thinking a swamp monster is out to get important businessmen, and if he does not sign the company back over to Mr. Pewterschmidt, he will be eaten. Gregory House also dresses as a swamp monster, however, and causes Lois to become confused, until she unmasks the monster in the style of Scooby-Doo. House then interjects by speaking in Hugh Laurie's original English accent, as opposed to the American accent used on the television show in which he stars.

== Reception ==
In a slight drop from the previous week, the episode was viewed in 7.67 million homes, in its original airing in the United States. The episode also received a 3.8 rating in the 18–49 demographic, edging out The Simpsons, The Cleveland Show, and American Dad!.

Receiving mixed reviews from critics, the episode was deemed "a throwback to the earlier more successful seasons." Ahsan Haque of IGN praised the storyline as consistent "from start to finish." Jason Hughes of TV Squad also praised the "inside jokes" in the episode, as well as the Scooby-Doo sequence as "a flash of satiric brilliance." In contrast, Emily VanDerWerff of The A.V. Club called the storyline "an excuse [for] jokes," giving the episode a B− rating. Glenn Diaz of BuddyTV praised Laurie's performance in the episode, stating that "his scenes were among the funniest on the episode." The TV Critic's Robin Pierson rated the episode 55, praising the storyline and Laurie's cameo while criticizing a non sequitur parody of Scooby-Doo.

== Controversy ==
Although it did not name this episode its "Worst TV Show of the Week", the Parents Television Council filed an indecency complaint about "Business Guy" two days after its airdate, citing the lapdance sequence as a possible violation of federal law regarding broadcast decency.
