= Dial Meg for Murder =

- Family Guy episode
- Episode no.: Season 8 Episode 11
- Directed by: Cyndi Tang-Loveland
- Written by: Alex Carter; Andrew Goldberg
- Production code: 7ACX12
- Original air date: January 31, 2010

Guest appearances
- Dave Boat as Various; Peter Chen as Various; Chace Crawford as Luke; Camille Guaty as Various; Victor J. Ho as Various; Allison Janney as Teen People Editor; Rachael MacFarlane as Various; Lisa Wilhoit as Connie D'Amico

Episode chronology
← Previous "Big Man on Hippocampus"	Next → "Extra Large Medium"
- Family Guy season 8

"Dial Meg for Murder" is the 11th episode of season eight of the animated comedy series Family Guy. It originally aired on Fox in the United States on January 31, 2010. The episode follows teenager Meg as she visits an inmate at the local prison and falls in love with him. She eventually ends up hiding the fugitive in the Griffin family home, however, and is convicted and sent to jail. After returning home, she becomes a hardened delinquent who continually tortures her family.

First announced at the 2009 San Diego Comic-Con, the episode was written by Alex Carter and Andrew Goldberg, and directed by Cyndi Tang-Loveland. It received mostly positive reviews for its storyline and cultural references, in addition to receiving criticism from the Parents Television Council. According to Nielsen ratings, the episode was viewed in 6.21 million homes in its original airing. The episode featured guest performances by Dave Boat, Peter Chen, Chace Crawford, Camille Guaty, Victor J. Ho, Allison Janney, Rachael MacFarlane, and Lisa Wilhoit along with several recurring guest voice actors for the series. "Dial Meg for Murder" was released on DVD along with ten other episodes from the season on December 13, 2011.

== Plot ==
When a local rodeo competition is announced in Quahog, Peter decides to enter. He trains in various ways, such as roping Meg and branding her, only to find he has been beaten to it by Mayor West, who takes her away, and using Chris. However, during the competition he quickly falls off his bull, which proceeds to rape him off-screen. Meanwhile, Brian meets the editor of Teen People (Allison Janney), who gives him a job writing an article about the average American girl. When he starts following and spying on Meg with Stewie for research, they discover that she has fallen in love with a young man in jail named Luke (Chace Crawford), whom she met through a school pen-pal project.

Brian reveals Meg's secret to Peter and Lois, who forbid her from seeing Luke again. However, Luke breaks out of jail during a prison riot and tries to hide in the Griffins' house. When Brian comes to Meg's room to apologize for what he did, he finds Luke just as Peter enters. Peter only knows what is happening when reading the episode's plot synopsis in TV Guide (the reason he entered the rodeo), and finds out who Luke is. As Luke escapes out the window, Peter alerts Joe, who apprehends Luke and arrests Meg for harboring a convict, for which she is imprisoned.

Three months later, Meg returns home with the attitude of a hardened criminal, complete with a new thuggish and rebellious look. She immediately begins abusing her family and going hostile on them, retaliating to the years of abuse she had endured under them, such as beating Peter senseless, sexually assaulting him in the shower with a loofah, and using Lois' shirts as toilet paper while also keeping a "poop bucket" next to her bed and refusing to empty it until it gets full. In addition, she continues habits she picked up in jail, and beats up the kids who bully her at school, specifically beating Connie D'Amico and her friends with a sack full of unopened soda cans and tongue-kissing Connie afterwards, (probably payback for mocking her at the school prom, making a butt joke at her expense, and/or for humiliating her twice when she tried to be cool like Connie) which gets her suspended from school. Brian says that's what the penal system does in America, saying that they turned Meg into a monster. She eventually overhears and the Griffins pass the blame on each other, until Peter finally blames Stewie, and everyone agrees with him, with Stewie annoyingly saying, "Oh, so now everyone understands me?" But Lois ignores him and says to Meg that they're worried about her. Which Meg replies she can take care of herself and she'll be out of the house by the end of the week. She leaves, but not before telling Stewie to punch himself in the face. Stewie, scared does so, but Meg tells Peter to do it, which he complies without hesitation. He asks her if she done good, which she replies (something Peter has been telling her for a long time), "Shut up." Which Peter takes as a good thing, while muttering, "I did good," under his breath in accomplishment.

Wanting to start a new life away from home, Meg ambushes Brian in his car and forces him to drive to Mort's Pharmacy at gunpoint, in order to rob him. Brian, however, shows her the article he wrote, in which he describes her "far sweeter and kinder" than the typical American girl. Touched by the fact that Brian views her in such high regard, Meg drops her rebellious attitude and look and returns home, where she makes a bad joke involving Wesley Snipes, prompting an unamused Peter to remark "Always end on a strong joke".

== Production and development ==
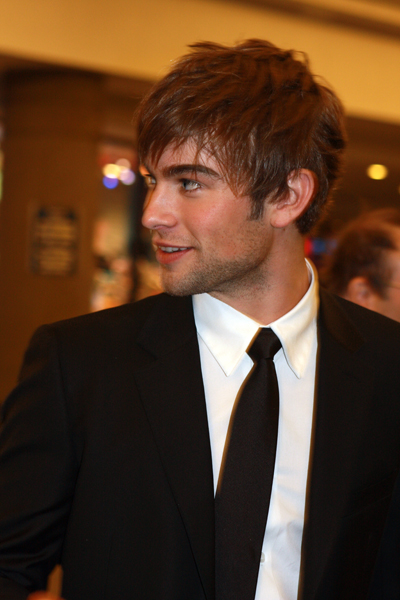
Chace Crawford guest starred in the episode as Luke.

First touched upon by actress Mila Kunis at the 2009 San Diego Comic-Con, the episode was written by Alex Carter and Andrew Goldberg, and directed by former King of the Hill director Cyndi Tang-Loveland, before the conclusion of the eighth production season, in her second episode for this season. Series regulars Peter Shin and James Purdum served as supervising directors, with Andrew Goldberg and Alex Carter working as staff writers for the episode.

"Dial Meg for Murder", along with the eleven other episodes from Family Guy's eighth season, was released on a three-disc DVD set in the United States on December 13, 2011. The sets include brief audio commentaries by various crew and cast members for several episodes, a collection of deleted scenes and animatics, a special mini-feature which discussed the process behind animating "And Then There Were Fewer", a mini-feature entitled "The Comical Adventures of Family Guy – Brian & Stewie: The Lost Phone Call", and footage of the Family Guy panel at the 2010 San Diego Comic-Con.

In addition to the regular cast, actress Allison Janney voiced the editor for Teen People, actor Chace Crawford voiced Luke, voice actress Lisa Wilhoit voiced Connie D'Amico, and voice actors Dave Boat, Peter Chen, Camille Guaty, Victor J. Ho, and Rachael MacFarlane guest starred as various characters in the episode. Recurring guest voice actors Lori Alan, Johnny Brennan, writer Steve Callaghan, Chris Cox, writer Danny Smith, writer Alec Sulkin and writer John Viener also made minor appearances. Recurring guest cast members Patrick Warburton and Adam West made guest appearances as well.

== Cultural references ==
The title is a reference to the 1954 Alfred Hitchcock thriller Dial M for Murder. At the beginning of the episode, Stewie rhetorically asks whether or not he can call the television magazine TV Guide "The Guide". In the scene where Brian spies on Meg for the Teen People article, Stewie quickly warns Brian that "not all dogs go to heaven", cutting to a quick scene with the Disney character Goofy (Mickey and Donald's best friend) from the Mickey Mouse shorts in hell with Satan claiming Goofy was part of the plotting of 9/11. Goofy justified his part in the attacks by pointing out the United States' support for Israel. Goofy is then thrown to the pit of fire, using his famous Goofy Holler one scene Stewie refers to Meg as "one of those crazy chicks, who hooks up with an even crazier guy," with a photograph of Jenny McCarthy and Jim Carrey then being shown. Meg beating her abusive classmates with a sackful of unopened soda cans is a parody of a scene in the 1983 film Bad Boys (in which Sean Penn's character uses soda cans to beat fellow inmates of a juvenile detention center.) The song "The Ballad of Billy the Kid" by singer and performer Billy Joel is used in depicting Peter's flashbacks about being a cowboy. Meg mentions meeting Wesley Snipes in the episode, and mentions his movie Passenger 57. The ending of the episode includes a reference to The Simpsons, in which Meg makes an unfunny joke, with Peter announcing he is not amused, responding by sarcastically stating "Always end on a strong joke." The start of the closing credits that follow the statement is styled to match those used in The Simpsons credits.

== Reception ==
In a significant decrease from the previous episode, the episode was viewed in 6.21 million homes in its original airing, according to Nielsen ratings. The 52nd Grammy Awards and the Pro Bowl aired simultaneously to the Animation Domination block, resulting in lower than usual ratings. Despite this, the episode also acquired a 3.2 rating in the 18–49 demographic, surpassing The Simpsons, American Dad! and The Cleveland Show, in both rating and total viewership.

Reviews of the episode were mostly positive, with critics finding "a lot to like about this episode." Jason Hughes of TV Squad gave the episode a positive review, stating that "[the writers] finally found an angle for a Meg-centric episode that was fully engaging and entertaining." Ahsan Haque of IGN also praised the episode, saying that "the fact that the writers chose to focus on a coherent storyline that relied mostly on contextual humor always helps," calling the ending "somewhat touching." Emily VanDerWerff of The A.V. Club criticized the storyline much more harshly, however, saying that it "relied too heavily on the show's old fallbacks of politically incorrect humor, and ostensibly funny violence."

The conservative Parents Television Council, a frequent critic of Family Guy and other Seth MacFarlane-produced shows, named Dial Meg for Murder its "Worst TV Show of the Week" for the week ending February 5, 2010, due to excessive violence in scenes featuring Meg as both the victim and the instigator. Also cited was the sequence where Peter unsuccessfully fights off an angry bull, and later is shown in a fetal position while the bull stands over him, implying rape, calling it "sickening."
