= Jerome Is the New Black =

- Family Guy episode
- Jerome becomes close friends with Peter.
- Episode no.: Season 8 Episode 7
- Directed by: Brian Iles
- Written by: John Viener
- Production code: 7ACX08
- Original air date: November 22, 2009

Guest appearances
- Kevin Michael Richardson as Jerome; Nana Visitor as Woman in restaurant, Brenda Quagmire

Episode chronology
← Previous "Quagmire's Baby"	Next → "Dog Gone"
- Family Guy season 8

"Jerome Is the New Black" is the seventh episode of the eighth season of the animated comedy series Family Guy. It originally aired on Fox in the United States on November 22, 2009. The episode follows Peter, Joe and Quagmire as they go on a search for a new friend, in the absence of Cleveland. The group eventually decides on Jerome, a hip bar patron, a choice Peter later regrets when he eventually finds out that Jerome and Lois used to date. Meanwhile, Brian attempts to discover the source of Quagmire's personal dislike of him, only to become upset once Quagmire rants at him during a dinner date.

The episode served as a follow-up to the exit of the main character Cleveland Brown, who left Family Guy in order to star in his own Fox spin-off, entitled The Cleveland Show. Voice actor Kevin Michael Richardson, who also stars as Cleveland Brown Jr. on The Cleveland Show, guest starred as Cleveland's replacement, Jerome. He would not appear again until the Season 11 episode, "Save the Clam", but he has appeared more regularly since then. It was first announced at the 2009 San Diego Comic-Con.

The episode was written by series regular John Viener and directed by Brian Iles. It received mixed reviews from critics for its storyline and cultural references. According to Nielsen ratings, it was viewed in 7.38 million homes in its original airing. The episode featured guest performances by Kevin Michael Richardson and Nana Visitor, along with several recurring guest voice actors for the series. "Jerome Is the New Black" was released on DVD along with seven other episodes from the season on June 15, 2010.

== Plot ==
Upset that Cleveland left the quartet to move to Stoolbend, Virginia, Peter, Quagmire and Joe decide to interview potential friends to fill the vacancy, and are approached by a fellow bar patron named Jerome. After impressing the group with his dart skills, the guys, after 'remembering' that the fact that Cleveland was black was what made it work, decide to let Jerome join as their new fourth member. Later, when Peter introduces Jerome to Lois, she reveals that the two used to date. Peter grows jealous and, in a fit of drunken rage, throws a bottle through the window of Jerome's home, inadvertently causing a fire and burning down his house. Jerome, unaware that Peter was the vandal who burned down his house, vows revenge on the culprit. The next morning, Peter discovers that Lois has invited Jerome to live with them. As time goes on, Peter cannot contain his jealousy and eventually kicks Jerome out. During an argument, Lois reveals that Jerome had bought Peter a gift, and he goes to apologize to Jerome for being so insensitive. Jerome forgives him and he remains friends with Peter, but admits to having had sex with Meg, to which Peter responds indifferently.

Meanwhile, Brian tries to join Peter's group, but Peter says it is not a good idea because Quagmire dislikes him. Brian attempts to rectify the situation outside Quagmire's house. However, Brian ends up making things worse by mistaking Quagmire's sister, who is hiding out from her abusive boyfriend, for one of his dates. Brian tricks Quagmire into going to dinner with him by making him think Cheryl Tiegs, Quagmire's long-lost love, is the one inviting him. At dinner, Brian attempts to make small talk, but Quagmire does not soften up. Finally, Brian asks Quagmire why he does not like him. Quagmire responds with an angry tirade detailing everything about Brian he finds objectionable, all of which he claims would be tolerable if it were not for the fact that Brian is "a big, sad, alcoholic bore". When a depressed Brian returns home, Stewie cheers him up by saying that he only needs to like himself, and then professes his own admiration for Brian by letting him spend the night in his room.

== Production and development ==
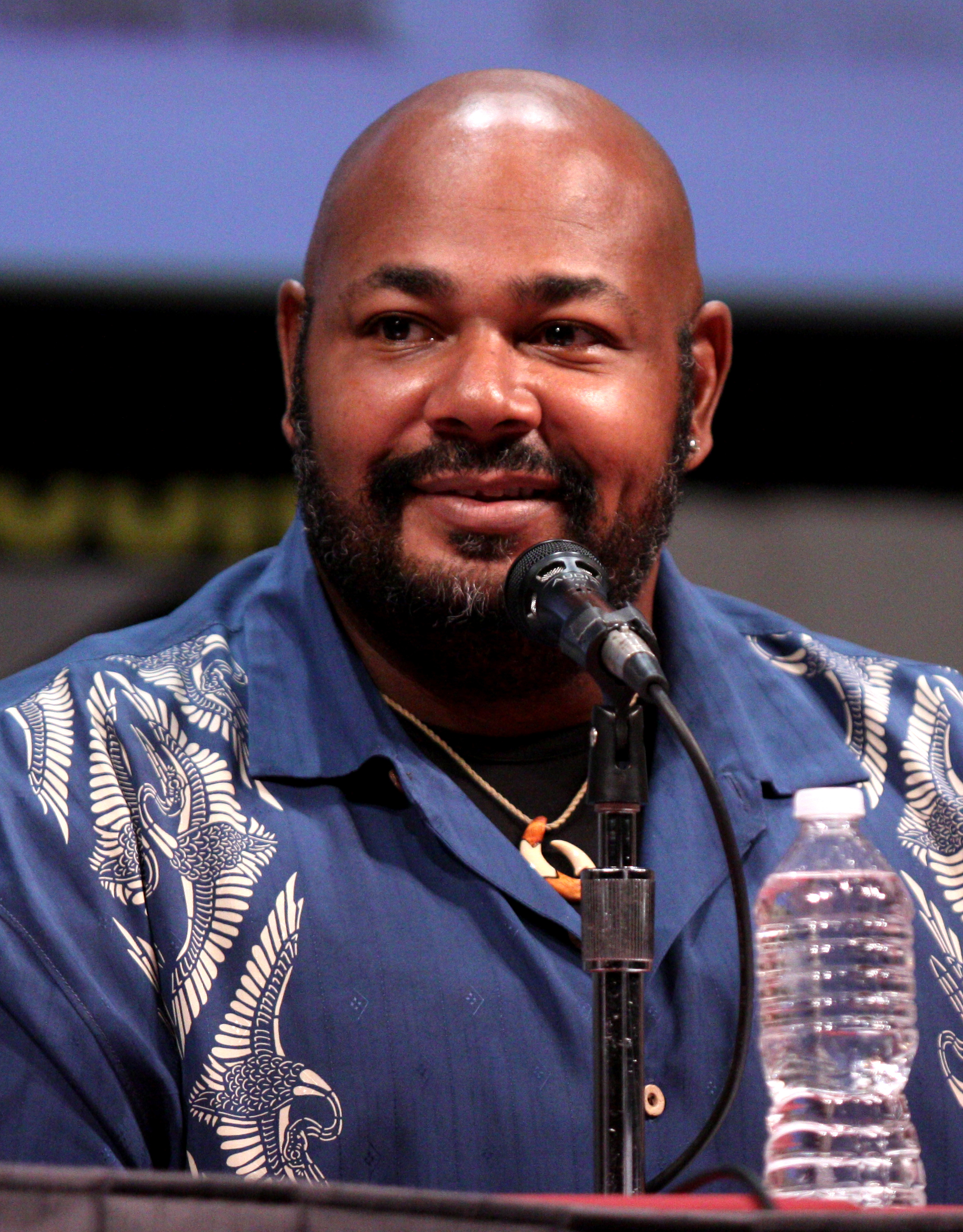
Kevin Michael Richardson provided the voice of Jerome.

First announced at the 2009 San Diego Comic-Con, the episode was written by series regular John Viener, and directed by Brian Iles before the conclusion of the eighth production season. The episode was produced to introduce a new fourth member to replace Cleveland Brown, after removing him from Family Guy, in order to create the spin-off series The Cleveland Show, which is also executive produced by Seth MacFarlane, as well as his voice actor, Mike Henry, and writer Richard Appel. Voice actor Kevin Michael Richardson, who portrayed Jerome in the episode, based the character largely on his role as Rockefeller Butts on the short-lived ABC comedy series The Knights of Prosperity. Series regulars Peter Shin and James Purdum served as supervising directors, with Danny Smith, Seth MacFarlane and David Zuckerman serving as staff writers for the episode.

In addition to the regular cast and Richardson, actress Nana Visitor briefly appeared as a crying woman in the episode. Recurring guest voice actors Johnny Brennan, Chris Cox, Ralph Garman, writer and showrunner Mark Hentemann, writer Alec Sulkin and writer John Viener also made minor appearances.

== Cultural references ==
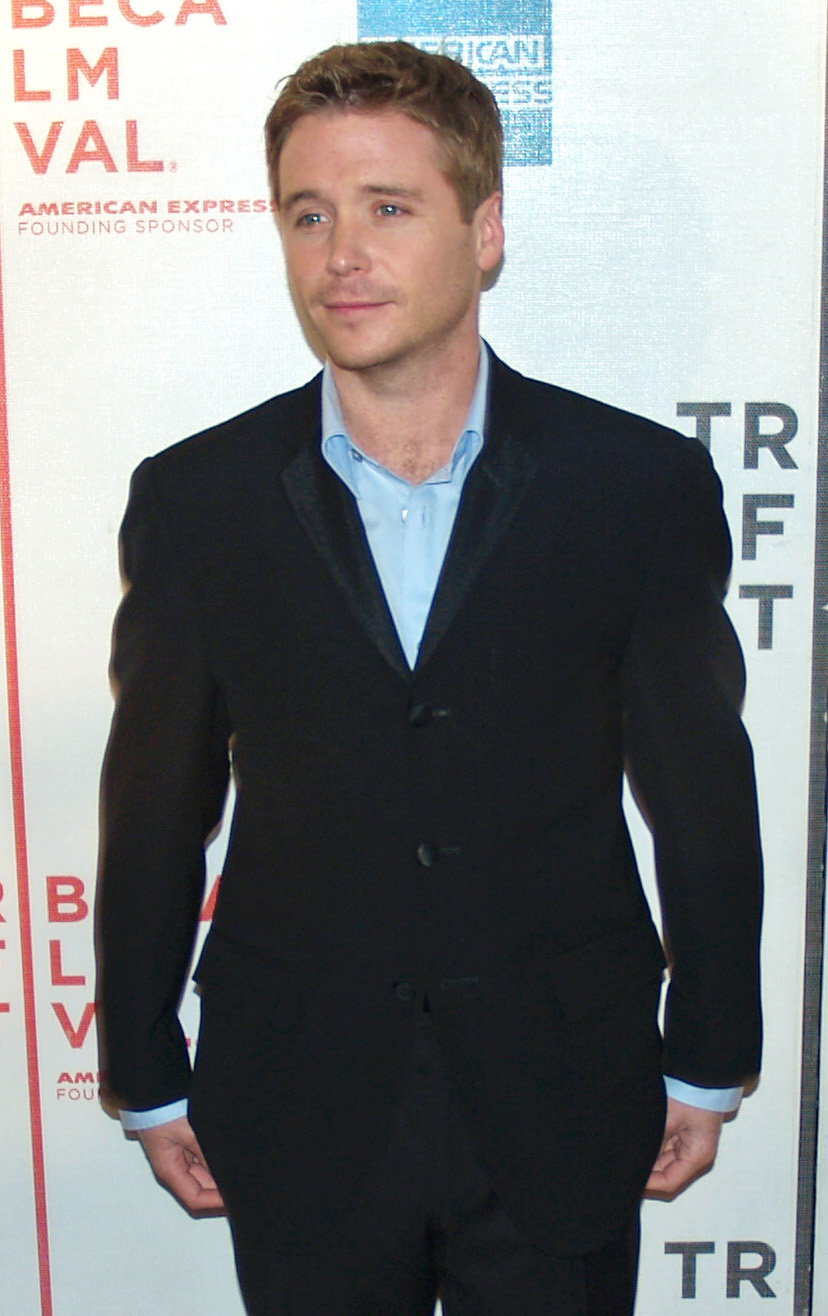
Actor Kevin Connolly was briefly referenced in the episode.

In the opening scene of the episode, Peter, Joe and Quagmire are shown watching television at the Drunken Clam, and an infomercial plays for a Rat Pack CD collection of their "most bigoted songs"; members Frank Sinatra, Sammy Davis Jr., and Dean Martin are shown, performing several "once-acceptable" songs with offensive and insensitive lyrics. Immediately after, the group believes that they see their old friend, Cleveland, who moved to Virginia, across the bar, but are disappointed when it is revealed to be a lamp. Peter then goes on to express his desire to finally replace Cleveland, stating that their group is just like the Muppets character Statler without Waldorf. Deciding to hold auditions for a replacement for their entourage, they first audition actor Kevin Connolly, who is discouraged from joining once Quagmire attempts to steal his Lucky Charms cereal.

At one point Peter suggests Jerome grab his nephew and "shoot people in the D.C. area" in reference to the Beltway sniper attacks. Feeling sorry for Jerome, Lois invites him to stay at their home, with Peter reluctantly agreeing, before suddenly being cut off mid-sentence by the Mac OS X spinning wait cursor. The next day, after Jerome decides to cook for Lois, Peter and Chris, sitting in the other room, overhear Lois passionately complimenting Jerome, and believe they are having sex. Racing to the kitchen, the two discover that she was only complimenting his food, with Don Knotts as Ralph Furley from the sitcom Three's Company also appearing.

Attempting to win over Quagmire, Brian decides to invite him to dinner, using model and actress Cheryl Tiegs as bait. Soon discovering the invitation to be fake, Quagmire is crushed, causing Brian to suggest that they can be a better team than Lewis and Clark, and a third member who enjoyed "ripping up maps." After Jerome is convinced to leave by Peter, Lois reveals a gift from Jerome of an original garbage structure made by character Nick Moore from the sitcom Family Ties, the show Jerome had been watching earlier when Peter was spying on him.

== Reception ==
"Jerome Is the New Black" was broadcast on November 22, 2009, as a part of an animated television night on Fox, and was preceded by an episode of The Simpsons, and Family Guy creator Seth MacFarlane's new show The Cleveland Show. It was followed by MacFarlane's second show, American Dad!. It was watched by 7.39 million viewers in its original airing, according to Nielsen ratings, despite airing simultaneously with the 2009 American Music Awards on ABC, Sunday Night Football on NBC and The Amazing Race on CBS. The episode also acquired a 3.8 rating in the 18–49 demographic, surpassing The Simpsons, The Cleveland Show and American Dad! in addition to edging out all three shows in total viewership.

Reviews of the episode were mostly mixed, calling it an "inconsistent mixed bag episode", with many jokes "[falling] flat". In a simultaneous review of the episodes of The Simpsons and American Dad! that preceded and followed the episode respectively, as well as The Cleveland Show, The A.V. Club's Emily VanDerWerff commented that she thought the episode "started out well before sort of just petering out as the episode went on", comparing it to South Park's attempt to replace Kenny McCormick, before ultimately reintroducing the character into the series. In the conclusion of her review, VanDerWerff praised Quagmire's monologue, commenting "it's certainly amusing that the show is spending all of this time tearing down the one character who's a mouthpiece for the creator." Ahsan Haque of IGN criticized the episode for its "execution", stating, "Auditioning friends to replace Cleveland seemed like a better idea on paper." Haque praised Quagmire's tirade against Brian, however, as "completely unexpected" and "mildly amusing", but ultimately gave the episode a 6.4 out of 10. In a subsequent review of Family Guy's eighth season, Ramsey Isler of IGN listed "Jerome Is the New Black" as "remarkably unfunny, with lazy and unoriginal writing."
