= Family Goy =

- Family Guy episode
- Episode no.: Season 8 Episode 2
- Directed by: James Purdum
- Written by: Mark Hentemann
- Production code: 7ACX01
- Original air date: October 4, 2009

Guest appearances
- Jeff Bergman as Max Weinstein; Max Burkholder as Child; Charles Durning as Francis Griffin; Ben Stein as Rabbi Goldberg; Bill Woodson as the narrator

Episode chronology
← Previous "Road to the Multiverse"	Next → "Spies Reminiscent of Us"
- Family Guy season 8

"Family Goy" is the second episode of the eighth season of the animated comedy series Family Guy. It originally aired on Fox in the United States on October 4, 2009. In the episode, Lois discovers that her mother is Jewish and begins her struggle to adapt to her newfound heritage. Meanwhile, Irish Catholic Peter begins to embrace his wife's new religion, but after a spiritual visit from his deceased stepfather, Francis, he becomes increasingly antisemitic towards Lois and the family.

First announced at the 2009 San Diego Comic-Con, the episode was written by Mark Hentemann and directed by James Purdum. It received mixed reviews from critics for its storyline and cultural references, in addition to receiving criticism from the Parents Television Council. According to Nielsen ratings, it was viewed in 9.66 million homes in its original airing. The episode featured guest performances by Jeff Bergman, Max Burkholder, Charles Durning, Ben Stein, and Bill Woodson, along with several recurring guest voice actors for the series. "Family Goy" was released on DVD along with seven other episodes from the season on June 15, 2010.

== Plot ==
While at the Drunken Clam, Peter falls in love with a cardboard cutout of Kathy Ireland. He takes her home and has an 'affair' with her. Soon he is caught by Lois who calls him an idiot. Peter introduces Kathy to the kids as their new mom, but after finding that Chris took her into his room, he angrily confronts her and ends up ripping her in half. He tearfully buries her in the yard and begs Lois for forgiveness. Lois forgives him and they have sex and Lois is shocked when Peter discovers a lump on her breast, causing her to go to the hospital the next day to have it tested for breast cancer. The test comes back negative, but while looking through her medical records, Dr Hartman discovers that Lois' mother is a Jewish Holocaust survivor, making Lois and her children Jewish by heritage much to her surprise. Barbara confirms her heritage, and Carter admits he kept it a family secret so that they could join the country club. Despite not being Jewish himself, Peter takes to it eagerly, much to Lois' frustration. That night, Peter is visited by the ghost of his adoptive father, Francis, who warns him that he will go to Hell for not being Catholic. The next day, Peter decides to re-convert the family to Catholicism and becomes increasingly antisemitic and prejudiced towards Lois’ heritage, going as far as firing a sniper rifle at Lois when she went out to retrieve the mail, greatly angering her.

Taking advice from her mother not to let Peter suppress her identity, like her own husband did to her, Lois decides to hold a Passover Seder, which Peter tries to ruin so he can celebrate Easter. He shows up in an Easter Bunny costume while drunk. Jesus appears, revealing he himself is Jewish, and points out that Catholicism and Judaism are very similar. He then tells Peter that he should treat people of different faiths as fairly as he wants to be treated. Peter and Lois apologize to each other, but are at a loss for what religion they should follow. When Peter asks Jesus what religion the Griffins should follow, he disagrees with all; Brian, himself an atheist, chimes in (offscreen) from the other side of the room, responding "Thank you!"

== Production and development ==
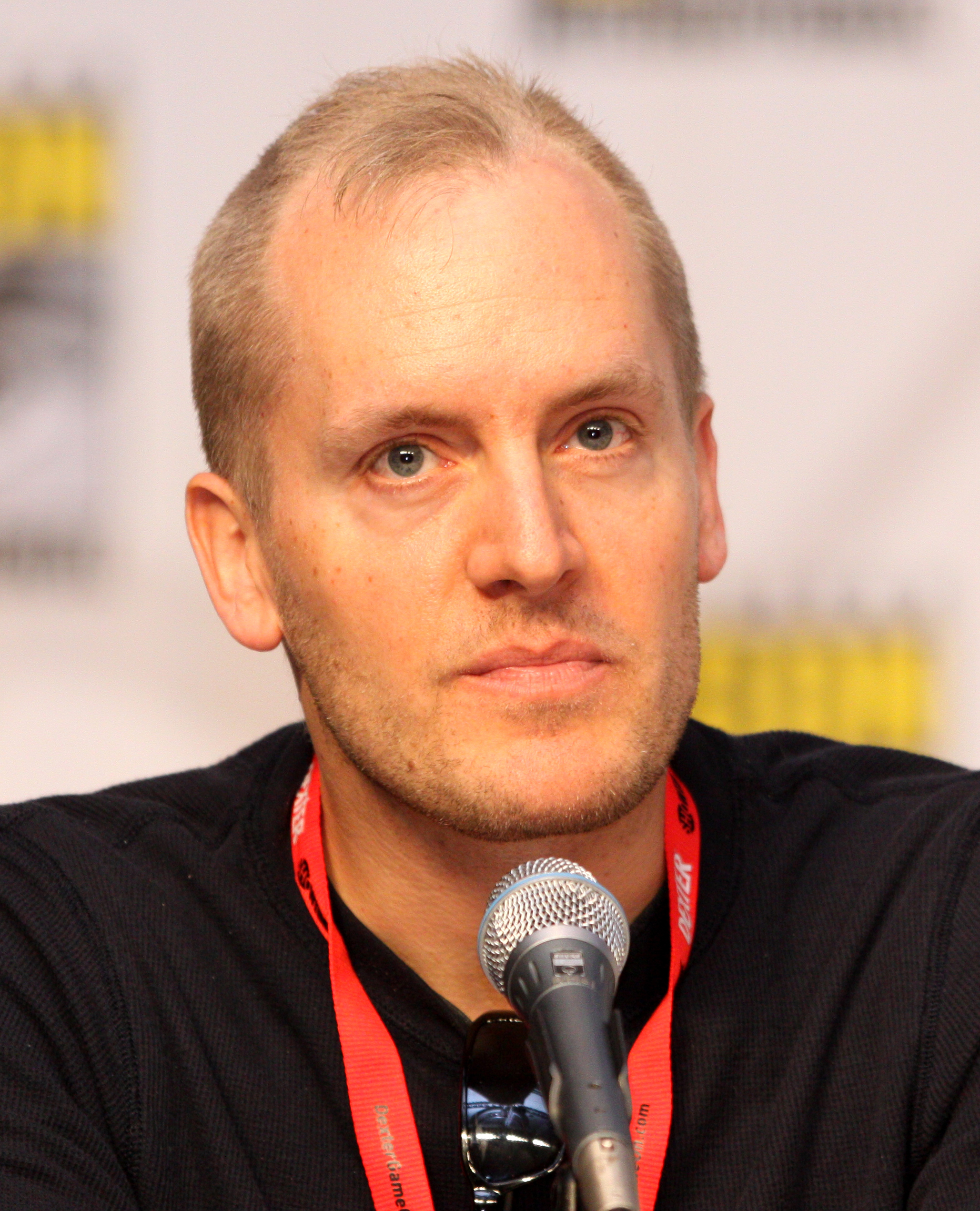
Mark Hentemann wrote the episode.

First announced at the 2009 San Diego Comic-Con in San Diego, California on July 25, 2009, by future showrunner Mark Hentemann, the episode was directed by supervising director James Purdum, written by Hentemann, shortly after the conclusion of the seventh production season.

"Family Goy", along with the seven other episodes from Family Guy's eighth season, were released on a three-disc DVD set in the United States on June 15, 2010. The sets included brief audio commentaries by Seth MacFarlane and various crew and cast members for several episodes, a collection of deleted scenes, a special mini-feature which discussed the process behind animating "Road to the Multiverse", and mini-feature entitled Family Guy Karaoke. This episode uses a story element from "Death is a Bitch", an episode written by Ricky Blitt, in which Lois discovers a lump on Peter's breast, thinking it would be cancer, whereas the opposite occurred in this episode.

Actors Ben Stein and Charles Durning guest starred in the episode as Rabbi Goldberg and Francis Griffin, respectively. Rabbi Goldberg and Max Weinstein, two Jewish characters whom Lois and Peter seek advice from after discovering Lois' heritage, made their second appearance in the series, having previously appeared in the third season episode "When You Wish Upon a Weinstein", which was originally banned from airing on network television. However, Peter Riegert did not reprise his role of Max Weinstein. Instead, voice actor Jeff Bergman, notable for playing Fred Flintstone in the show, voices him. In addition to Stein, Durning, Bergman, and the regular cast, child actor Max Burkholder and voice actor William Woodson guest starred in the episode. Recurring guest voice actors Johnny Brennan, actor Ralph Garman, writer Mark Hentemann, writer Danny Smith, writer Alec Sulkin, and writer John Viener also made minor appearances.

== Cultural references ==
"Family Goy" contained various cultural references. The episode opens with a parody of the opening sequence of The All-New Super Friends Hour, with the central characters of Family Guy replacing The All-New Super Friends Hour's main characters, except for Meg. When Peter first sees the Kathy Ireland cutout, he starts to sing the Billy Ocean song, "Suddenly". As Lois collects the mail Peter attempts to shoot her, topless and armed with a sniper rifle, but instead hits the mailbox which is reminiscent of a scene in Schindler's List of Amon Göth shooting down Jews in the Kraków-Płaszów concentration camp in occupied Poland. Stewie's prayer over the candles is a real prayer that women recite before a non-Sabbath festival's start; however, the prayer turns into a reference to the 1984 adventure film Indiana Jones and the Temple of Doom, where Indian priest Mola Ram takes out a man's heart during a ritual. Peter references William Shakespeare's play Macbeth, but the cutaway gag shows a battle in a spaceship, at which Peter admits that he is not very familiar with Shakespeare's works.

== Reception ==
"Family Goy" was first broadcast in the United States and Canada on Fox on October 4, 2009. The episode was viewed by 9.66 million people and received a 5.4/8 Nielsen Rating, making "Family Goy" the ninth most-watched show of the night it was broadcast.

The episode was met with mixed critical responses. Ahsan Haque of IGN praised the second half of the episode but felt that the Kathy Ireland plot was too long. In his review, he commented "It's definitely meant for people who are open-minded to this kind of humor, and can make sure they treat the subject matter purely as comedy and not any manner of social commentary or prejudice. Take away the slow start, and this episode managed to really deliver some memorable shocking comedy." TV Guide critic Alex Rocha praised the show's League of Justice opening sequence and the Kathy Ireland plot but reacted negatively to the second half of the episode, stating that he "dozed off" during the last fifteen minutes. TV Guide also listed the episode on the "TV hot list" of October 4. The Toronto Star noted the episode was "worth watching". Todd VanDerWerff of The A.V. Club gave the episode a negative review, giving it a C− grade and concluding that, "Overall, the episode was just an excuse to drag out a bunch of tired Jewish jokes and also have Peter briefly descend into antisemitism". Though she mostly disliked the episode, VanDerWerff praised Stewie's part in the episode, as well as the Shakespeare cutaway gag and a cutaway that featured Peter getting into fight with a cat. Jewish Journal critic Adam Willis commented "My hope is that the series will roast the familiar Jewish themes introduced in “Family Goy,” rather than continuing on the Jews-as-targets route. The show has regularly featured some inspiring Jewish gags – both in good taste and bad. And while Hebrew community in-jokes would be better received by Jewish viewers, the likely reality is the Holocaust humor will continue to dominate."

Media watchdog group the Parents Television Council, a frequent critic of the show, named "Family Goy" its "Worst TV Show of the Week" for the week ending October 9, 2009, criticizing what it saw as an antisemitic plot.
