= Glenn Quagmire =

Fictional Family Guy character

- Family Guy character
- First appearance: "Death Has a Shadow" (1999)
- Created by: Seth MacFarlane
- Designed by: Seth MacFarlane
- Voiced by: Seth MacFarlane

In-universe information
- Full name: Glenn Quagmire
- Gender: Male
- Occupation: US Navy ensign (discharged); Commercial Airline Pilot
- Family: Ida Davis (father); Crystal Quagmire (mother); Brenda Quagmire (sister); Gary Quagmire (brother)
- Spouses: Joan Quagmire (deceased); Charmisse Quagmire (divorced)
- Children: Anna Lee Quagmire (daughter); Courtney Quagmire (daughter)
- Nationality: American

Glenn Quagmire, who is usually referred to by his surname, is a fictional character from the American adult animated sitcom Family Guy. He is a neighbor and friend of the Griffin family and is best known for his hypersexuality and his catchphrase, "Giggity Giggity". The show's creator and voice actor Seth MacFarlane describes him as "an appalling human being who is still caught in the Rat Pack era" based on anachronistic 1950s party-animal clichés. The episode "Tiegs for Two" revealed that the surname Quagmire was originally the Polish surname Quagglechek or Quaggleczyk, the suffix -czyk indicating a diminutive in the Polish language.

== Origins and vocal style ==
The name Quagmire was chosen by a college acquaintance of MacFarlane's. MacFarlane came up with Quagmire's voice after listening to fast-talking radio jockeys from the 1950s era, describing Quagmire as a "50s radio guy on coke." The "giggity" phrase was inspired by Steve Marmel's Jerry Lewis impression.

== Role in the show ==
Quagmire is a bachelor who works as a commercial airline pilot. He lives on Spooner Street where he is a neighbor and best friend of Peter Griffin, Cleveland Brown, and Joe Swanson. He has had two spouses: Joan, a maid for the Griffins who died; and Charmise, a prostitute whom he divorced. The episode, "I Take Thee Quagmire", was acknowledged by MacFarlane as the first to have a plot revolving around Quagmire.

During his time in Korea in service in Busan, he had a brief career as a soap opera star by the name of "American Johnny" and was lovers with his co-star, Sujin. Although presumably the breakout character of the series, Quagmire is incapable of speaking Korean: claiming he was instructed to "sound out the words phonetically" and was unaware of what he was saying whilst filming. Quagmire and Sujin would reconnect during his brief travel there with Peter, Joe, and Cleveland. At an unknown point in time, Quagmire learned to speak French during layovers in Montreal: claiming he is loved in France. Quagmire briefly dated Cheryl Tiegs in the early 1980s, but she dumped him because of his constant jealousy and his sex addiction. Cheryl, whom Quagmire considers his long-lost one true love, would again appear twice in Quagmire's life, both times due to Brian Griffin's meddling: the first one, when Brian invited him to dinner under the pretense he was going to dinner with her; the second one, when Brian dated her just to torment him (Quagmire retaliates by dating Brian's ex-girlfriend Jillian). Quagmire despises Brian and vice versa, leading to a feud that spans several episodes.

In the episode "Quagmire's Baby", he discovers that he has a daughter, Anna Lee, but puts her up for adoption; several episodes imply that Quagmire has fathered several other children. His father, Dan, is introduced in the episode "Quagmire's Dad"; he is a naval veteran of the Vietnam War who has a sex reassignment and adopts the name Ida. Quagmire's sister, Brenda, is first seen in the episode "Jerome is the New Black" and is the subject of "Screams of Silence: The Story of Brenda Q". In both episodes she is the victim of domestic violence from her partner Jeff, whom Quagmire murders in order to protect her. The episode "Quagmire's Mom" reveals that he has a strained, dysfunctional relationship with his mother, who had acted sexually towards him; other episodes have implied that the two have actually had sex.

In "The Stewaway", Quagmire reveals he lost his virginity at 6 years old when a female pedophile plumber raped him while working at the Quagmires' house at the time.

He is characterized as indulging in numerous sexual fetishes such as BDSM, frotteurism, biastophilia, somnophilia, erotic asphyxiation, voyeurism, exhibitionism, zoophilia, and necrophilia. He also has a predilection for teenage girls, including Peter's daughter Meg, whenever they turn 18. Following the episode "Family Goy", he develops a pornography addiction after discovering the existence of internet pornography. When in sexual situations, he often shouts variations of his catchphrase "giggity", which has been used on Family Guy merchandise such as keyrings.

Scenes involving Quagmire's sexual behavior have sometimes been censored by Fox, such as a cut-away in the episode "Airport '07" which implied that he engaged in sex with a dead virgin at her funeral. The Parents Television Council, a long-time critic of Family Guy, says that Quagmire provides "some of the tawdriest moments" in the show.
