= Mark Hentemann =

American actor

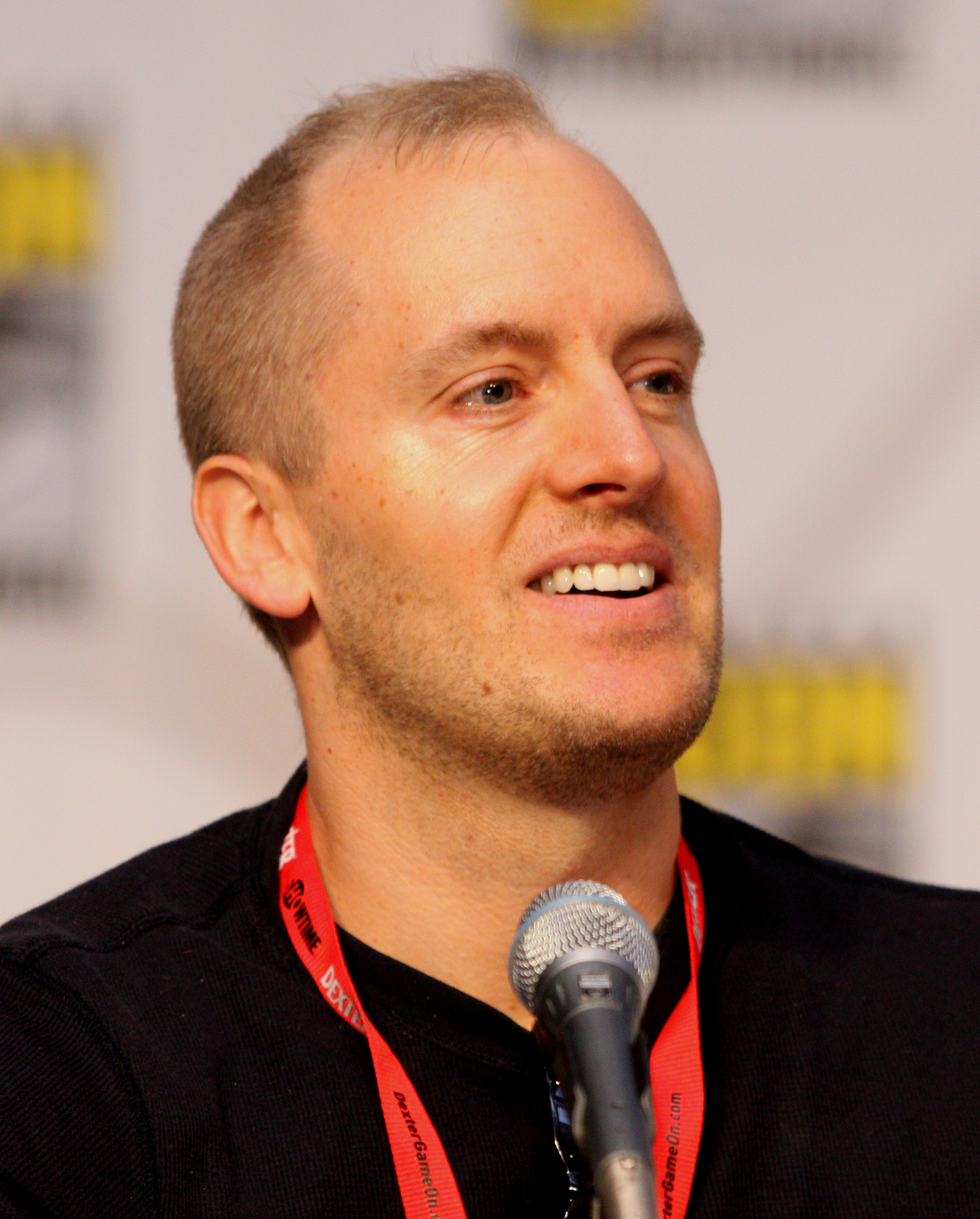
- Hentemann at the 2010 San Diego Comic-Con.
- Born: April 24, 1969 (age 57); Cleveland, Ohio, U.S.
- Occupations: Writer, voice actor, producer, showrunner
- Years active: 1996–present
- Spouse: Lynne Hentemann
- Children: 3

Mark Henry Hentemann (born April 24, 1969) is an American screenwriter, creator and producer for television and film. He is a writer, executive producer and former showrunner of the animated series Family Guy, where he started as a writer in its first season. In addition, Hentemann has also provided voices for many minor characters on Family Guy, including the "Phony Guy", Opie, and Eddie the Ostrich.

Hentemann has also written for the Late Show with David Letterman, created the series 3-South for MTV, and also the animated series, Bordertown for Fox in 2016 on the network's Sunday Funday lineup, which Seth MacFarlane and he executive produced. He is currently working on a reboot of The Naked Gun franchise for Paramount.

Hentemann is also a long-time real estate investor. Having moved to Los Angeles penniless in 1998, he began investing his script earnings into multifamily. He is founder of Quantum Capital, a real estate investment firm, and host of "The Wild West Real Estate Podcast".

== Career ==
Hentemann grew up in Cleveland, Ohio. He is an alumnus of Saint Ignatius High School in Ohio City, and began his career as a greeting card writer and illustrator for American Greetings. His cards caught the interest of David Letterman and allowed him his first job in television writing for The Late Show.

Mark Hentemann has written, produced and provided voice acting on several half-hours, including "Off-Centre" (WBTV), "Run of the House" (WBTV) 3-South, which he created for MTV and lasted only one season. He also created the animated series Bordertown for FOX, on which he voice acted, created and executive produced and also ran for only one season.

Hentemann has twice been nominated for a Primetime Emmy Award (including a nomination for Outstanding Comedy Series).

Hentemann is also a long time real estate investor. He is co-founder of the investment company Quantum Capital, which invests in multifamily real estate in Los Angeles, Austin and Denver, with $200,000,000 in assets under management.

== Personal life ==
Mark Hentemann lives in Los Angeles, CA with his wife, Lynne, and has three children, Tatum (b. 2004), Grace (b. 2008), and Emerson (b. 2008). Tatum, does occasional voices for Family Guy and American Dad!. Hentemann's daughter Grace played the live-action version of Stewie Griffin in the Family Guy episode "Road to the Multiverse". She wears red overalls and is seated next to the live-action Brian Griffin, played by writer Wellesley Wild's dog. Wild is the writer of the episode. Hentemann attended Saint Ignatius High School, and Miami University..

== Filmography ==
=== Voice Acting - Television ===
Year	Title	Role	Notes
2002–2003	3-South	Joe Tate, Ed Bickel (voice)	Creator, writer, executive producer
2008–2009	Seth MacFarlane's Cavalcade of Cartoon Comedy	Mountain Climber, Vishnu (voice)	3 Episodes
2010	The Cleveland Show	Unknown Role	Episode: How Cleveland Got His Groove Back
2010	Family Guy: It's a Trap!	Opie	Television Special
2016	Bordertown	Bryce	Creator, writer, executive producer

=== Writing credits ===
Year	Title	Notes
1997–98	"The Late Show with David Letterman"	
2000	Boyer Brothers	TV movie
1999–present	Family Guy	(37 episodes)
2001–2002	Off Centre	(15 episodes)
2001–2002	3-South	(13 episodes)
2003	Run of the House	(13 episodes)
2025	The Naked Gun	

=== As Executive Producer ===
Year	Title	Notes
2001–2002	Off Centre	7 Episodes
2003	3-South	7 Episodes
2003	Run of the House	
2009–present	Family Guy	52 Episodes
2016	Bordertown	13 Episodes

=== Video games ===
Year	Video game	Voices
2006	Family Guy Video Game!	Opie

== Awards ==
=== Primetime Emmy Awards ===
Year	Award	Nominated work	Result
2008	Outstanding Animated Program	Family Guy for "Blue Harvest"	Nominated
2009	Outstanding Comedy Series	Family Guy	Nominated
