= Peter-assment =

- Family Guy episode
- Episode no.: Season 8 Episode 14
- Directed by: Julius Wu
- Written by: Chris Sheridan
- Production code: 7ACX16
- Original air date: March 21, 2010

Guest appearances
- Max Burkholder as child doctor; Richard Dreyfuss as himself; Carrie Fisher as Angela; Jim Goldenberg as himself; Max Hodges as himself; Maurice Lamont; Harvey Levin as himself; Jack Samson; Will Shadley as child singer; Anthony Skillman as child singer; Steve Urquilla

Episode chronology
← Previous "Go, Stewie, Go!"	Next → "Brian Griffin's House of Payne"
- Family Guy season 8

"Peter-assment" is the 14th episode of the eighth season of the animated comedy series Family Guy. It originally aired on Fox in the United States on March 21, 2010. The title of the episode, like the fourth season's episodes "Petarded", "Peterotica" and "Petergeist", is a portmanteau between "Peter" and "Harassment". The episode follows Peter after he becomes a paparazzo, and begins to annoy the citizens and local celebrities in Quahog, and eventually breaks his glasses. Peter then becomes the target of sexual lust by his boss at the Pawtucket Brewery, Angela, who finds him attractive without his occasional eyewear. Continually refusing to have relations with her, Peter tries to avoid Angela, but she fires him and attempts suicide, leaving him with no choice but to acknowledge her deep-rooted sexual desires.

The episode was written by Chris Sheridan and directed by Julius Wu. It received mostly mixed reviews from critics for its storyline and many cultural references, in addition to receiving some criticism from the family of Terri Schiavo for its opening act. According to Nielsen ratings, it was viewed in 6.65 million homes in its original airing. The episode featured guest performances by Max Burkholder, Richard Dreyfuss, Carrie Fisher, Jim Goldenberg, Max Hodges, Maurice Lamont, Harvey Levin, Jack Samson, Will Shadley, Anthony Skillman and Steve Urquilla, along with several recurring guest voice actors for the series. "Peter-assment" was released on DVD along with ten other episodes from the season on December 13, 2011.

== Plot ==
Attending a play being held at the Little Clam Pre-School about Terri Schiavo, the Griffin family wait eagerly to see Stewie appear in the starring role as "The Plug." Succumbing to stage fright, however, Stewie wets himself and begins crying, with Peter recording it all on video. Panning the camera down to another row in the auditorium, Peter notices actor Richard Dreyfuss and begins recording him while pestering him with personal questions. Deciding to sell the video to TMZ, Peter quickly becomes enthralled with being a Paparazzo and decides to buy a professional-grade video camera. He then begins recording other town celebrities, including Tom Tucker, Mayor Adam West, and Ollie Williams, who smashes Peter's camera as well as his glasses. Unable to fix them in time for work the next day, he decides to wear contacts instead. When he arrives at work, his boss, Angela, notices something different about his appearance and develops a sexual attraction for him. Angela begins hitting on Peter, enlisting him to do various odd sexual favors for her. This culminates in her inviting Peter to her house one evening, which Peter realizes is an attempt to have sex with him. Peter fears that going against her will result in being fired, and agrees to visit Angela. He then enlists his neighbor, Quagmire, to go with him, and hides him inside Peter's clothing, planning to have sex with Angela in place of Peter. He soon backs out, however, when he finds Angela to be unattractive, leading Peter to have to refuse to have sex with her, and eventually being fired from his job.

Deciding to drink away his sorrows, Peter begins watching an old film featuring Robert Mitchum, in which he slaps a woman. Mitchum then breaks the fourth wall and tells Peter to stand up for himself. Deciding to use physical violence against Angela, Peter drives to her house where he finds her in her car in the garage, attempting suicide by carbon monoxide poisoning. Peter quickly resuscites her, and Angela confesses that she has no hope in life, after not having been with another man for more than ten years. Deciding to help her out by getting her a date with another man, Peter disguises himself as a high society Englishman named "Reginald Knickerbocker." The two then have dinner together, before Angela brings him back to the house and tries to seduce him while still threatening to kill herself if he refuses. Peter, as Reginald, reluctantly agrees, rekindling her will to live. Seeing through his disguise, Angela then rehires Peter. Later, at The Drunken Clam with Quagmire and Joe, Peter reveals that he had actually secretly paid Mort Goldman to have sex with his boss and remembers that Mort is still inside his clothes.

== Production and development ==
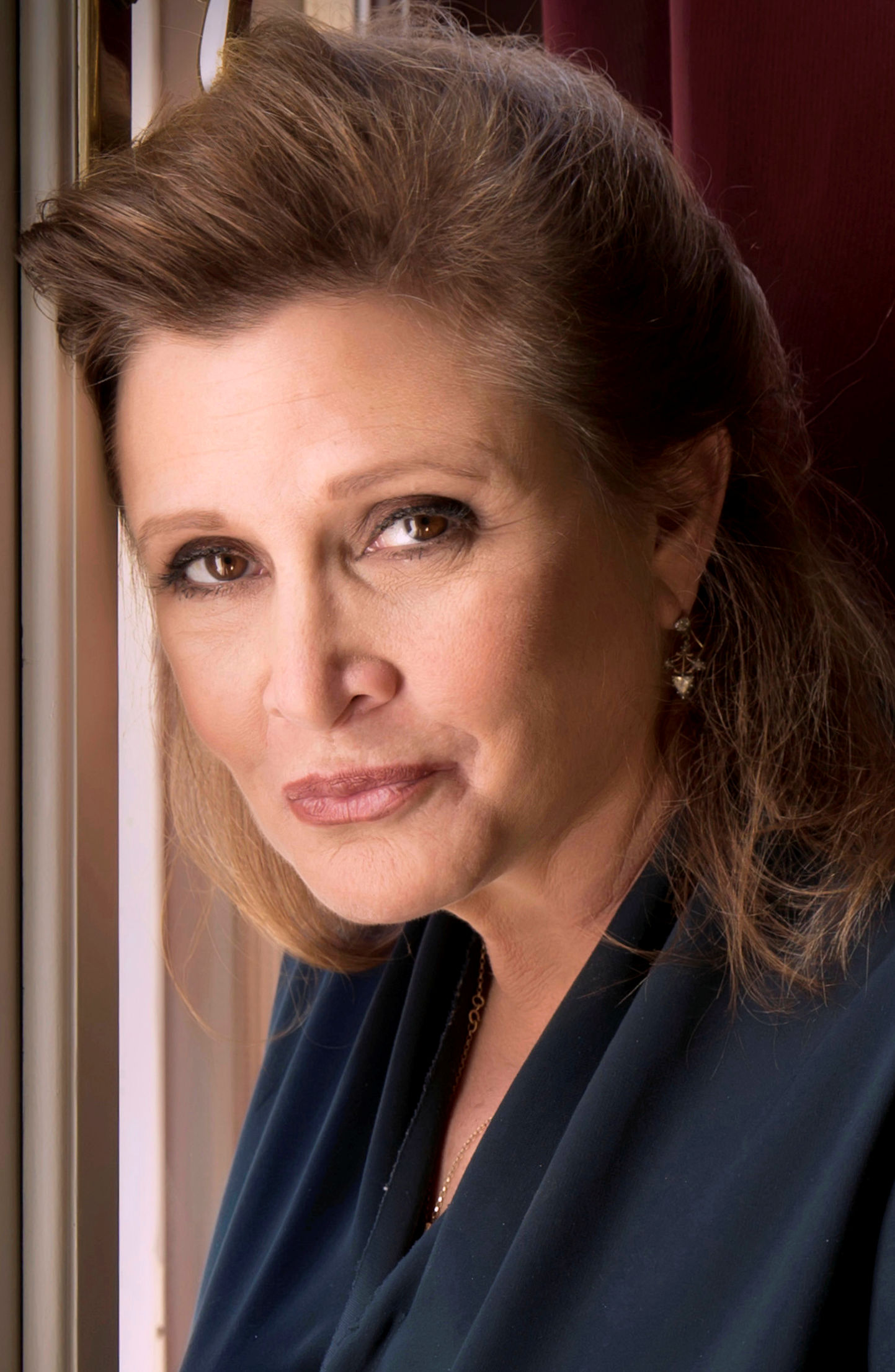
Carrie Fisher returned as Peter's boss, Angela

The episode was written by Family Guy executive producer Chris Sheridan, who joined the show in its first season, writing the second episode of the series "I Never Met the Dead Man". It was directed by series regular Julius Wu, who joined the show in its fifth season, directing the episode "The Tan Aquatic with Steve Zissou". Series regulars Peter Shin and James Purdum served as supervising directors, with Andrew Goldberg and Alex Carter working as staff writers for the episode. Composer Walter Murphy, who has worked on the series since its inception, returned to compose the music for "Peter-assment". Actress Carrie Fisher, who is most famous for her role as Princess Leia in Star Wars, first joined the series as Peter's boss, Angela, in the fourth season episode "Jungle Love". Fisher has been given high praise for her portrayal of the character, with The Hollywood Reporter calling it one of her "5 Most Iconic Roles."

"Peter-assment", along with the eleven other episodes from Family Guy's eighth season, was released on a three-disc DVD set in the United States on December 13, 2011. The sets include brief audio commentaries by various crew and cast members for several episodes, a collection of deleted scenes and animatics, a special mini-feature which discussed the process behind animating "And Then There Were Fewer", a mini-feature entitled "The Comical Adventures of Family Guy – Brian & Stewie: The Lost Phone Call", and footage of the Family Guy panel at the 2010 San Diego Comic-Con.

In addition to the regular cast and Fisher, voice actor Max Burkholder, actors Richard Dreyfuss, Maurice Lamont, Anthony Skillman, and Steve Urquilla; producer Jim Goldenberg; reporter Max Hodges; media reporter Harvey Levin; and voice actors Jack Samson and Will Shadley guest starred in the episode. Recurring guest voice actors John G. Brennan and Ralph Garman, and writers Danny Smith, Alec Sulkin and John Viener also made minor appearances.

== Reception ==
"Peter-assment" was broadcast on March 21, 2010, as a part of an animated television night on Fox, and was preceded by The Simpsons and also The Cleveland Show, the spin-off series from Family Guy creator and executive producer Seth MacFarlane. It was followed by the short-lived live-action series Sons of Tucson. It was watched by 6.65 million viewers, according to Nielsen ratings, despite airing simultaneously with Desperate Housewives on ABC, The Amazing Race on CBS and Celebrity Apprentice on NBC. The episode also acquired a 3.5/8 rating in the 18–49 demographic, beating The Simpsons, The Cleveland Show and Sons of Tucson, in addition to significantly edging out all three shows in total viewership. The episode's ratings decreased slightly from the previous week's episode, "Go Stewie Go".

Reviews of the episode were mostly mixed, calling the storyline "a string of poorly executed jokes with some mild successes sprinkled here and there." Ramsey Isler of IGN also called out the episode as "a mashed together mess of two stories that would have worked much better separately," in addition to praising actress Carrie Fisher in her returning role as Angela. In a subsequent review of Family Guy's eighth season, Isler listed "Peter-assment" as being "full of the lowest of the lowest-common-denominator "jokes", with heavy reliance on toilet humor and the characteristic cutaway gags that have steadily gotten more random and less funny." In a simultaneous review of The Simpsons episode "Stealing First Base" and The Cleveland Show episode "Once Upon a Tyne in New York" that preceded "Peter-assment", Emily VanDerWerff of The A.V. Club called the storyline a "junk drawer," criticizing the writers' overuse of jokes, "in the hopes some of them [would] land." Jason Hughes of TV Squad also criticized the storyline, saying the interaction between Peter and Angela "went to pretty uncomfortable levels," while praising the episode for "[showing] us that harassment can and does go both ways."

In reaction to the opening musical number about Terri Schiavo, Schiavo's brother, Bobby Schindler Jr., said, "My family was astonished at the cruelty and bigotry towards our beloved sister, and all disabled people that we witnessed in this show. My first thought was how this attempt at satire must have been enormously difficult and painful for my mother." He continued, "The depiction of Terri in the Family Guy episode on March 21 is not only inaccurate, it seems to take the position that certain people are simply not worthy of receiving medical care because they are viewed as burdens on the health care system." In addition, Schindler has also stated that he hopes to soon enlist the aid of other advocacy groups to protest the episode, "and perhaps see some sponsors end support of the show." Other anti-abortion activists, including Jill Stanek, wrote of the opening, "Last night's episode of Family Guy opened with a truly shocking scene [...] This is the same television series that had an abortion episode canceled in August 2009. Creator Seth MacFarlane's goal is [to] get buzz by being offensive."
