= Partial Terms of Endearment =

- Family Guy episode
- DVD cover
- Episode no.: Season 8 Episode 21
- Directed by: Joseph Lee
- Written by: Danny Smith
- Production code: 7ACX10
- Original air dates: June 20, 2010 (BBC Three); September 28, 2010 (US, DVD)

Guest appearances
- Gary Beach as Various; Jackson Douglas as Dale Robinson; Phil LaMarr as Various; Will Sasso as Various; Julia Sweeney as Naomi Robinson; Rutina Wesley as Cheryl; Wil Wheaton as Protester; Michael York as Nature Narrator

Episode chronology
← Previous "Something, Something, Something, Dark Side"	Next → "And Then There Were Fewer"
- Family Guy season 8

"Partial Terms of Endearment" is the 21st and final episode of the eighth season of the animated sitcom Family Guy. Directed by Joseph Lee and written by Danny Smith, the episode originally aired on BBC Three in the United Kingdom on June 20, 2010 and has not been allowed to air in the United States on Fox, the original television network of the series, due to its controversial nature. This is also the last episode to be presented in full screen, before the series switched to widescreen, and it is the final episode to feature the opening sequence that was updated during the second season.

In the episode, Lois is approached by an old friend from college who asks her to become a surrogate mother. After arguing with her husband Peter who is against the idea, Lois agrees and undergoes in vitro fertilization. However, while Lois is pregnant, the biological parents are killed in an automobile accident. Lois and Peter have to decide whether to abort the fetus, or carry it to term and give the baby up for adoption. Peter attempts to persuade his wife to get an abortion but changes his mind after anti-abortion activists convince him that abortion is murder. After deliberating with Peter at home, Lois has the abortion.

The episode was banned from airing on the Fox network due to concerns over its portrayal of the controversial subject of abortion. This is the second episode of Family Guy to be prevented from airing during the episode's respective regular season run; the first episode was the third season's "When You Wish Upon a Weinstein". Unlike that episode, Cartoon Network's adult-oriented block Adult Swim refused to air "Partial Terms of Endearment" upon Fox's request. It was first announced at the 2009 San Diego Comic-Con.

Critical responses to the episode were mostly positive; critics praised the storyline, cultural references and its assessment of the subject of abortion. The episode was watched in just under a million homes in its original airing in the United Kingdom. Guest performances included Gary Beach, Jackson Douglas, Phil LaMarr, Will Sasso, Julia Sweeney, Wil Wheaton and Michael York, along with several recurring guest voice actors for the series. "Partial Terms of Endearment" was released on DVD in the United States, along with Seth and Alex Almost-Live Comedy Show, on September 28, 2010. Even though this episode was placed at the end of season 8, the episode was placed between "Go Stewie Go" and "Peter-assment" in the UK.

== Plot ==
While attending her college reunion at Salve Regina University with Peter, Lois spots her old roommate, Naomi Robinson, with whom she had a brief lesbian relationship in college, about which Peter is shocked but excited to discover. Naomi indicates that she would like to discuss an important matter with them at their home. Assuming that he will participate in a threesome with Lois and Naomi, Peter sends Chris, Meg, Stewie, and Brian out of the house. After Naomi arrives, she introduces her husband Dale. Peter expects that they will now be participating in an orgy, and tries to seduce the three of them while dressed in various costumes. When they clear the air to a dismayed Peter that they are not there for sex, Naomi and Dale tell Lois and Peter they have had trouble conceiving and ask Lois to be a surrogate mother for them, and Lois considers the matter.

As the family eats breakfast the next morning, Lois reveals her intention to become a surrogate mother for Naomi and Dale, causing Peter to become upset at the thought of her being pregnant for nine months. Despite this, Lois decides to go to Dr. Hartman to have the in vitro fertilization performed, enduring more of Dr. Hartman's shtick involving celebrity crossbreeds and having a tribe of bush men implant the egg with blowguns. A pregnancy test comes back positive the next day, and a furious Peter attempts to cause Lois to have a miscarriage before ultimately confronting her about the pregnancy. While she continues asserting her intention to provide a child to Naomi and Dale, Quahog 5 News suddenly reveals that Naomi and Dale died in a car crash on Interstate 95, ironically after Dale won the lottery. Devastated by the announcement, Lois questions whether she should have an abortion or continue with the pregnancy and put the baby up for adoption.

In an attempt to come to a decision, Lois and Peter decide to visit the local family-planning center, and ultimately decide to abort the embryo. However, as Peter exits the center he encounters an anti-abortion rally, where he is shown an anti-abortion video by one of the protesters. The video causes him to reconsider about aborting the unborn baby. Returning home, Lois continues to advocate her right to choose, while Peter now attempts to argue the unborn child's right to life and whether Lois has the responsibility of carrying it to term. At their wits' end, the two decide to discuss the matter on civil terms. At dinner, Lois talks with the family about "the wonderful new member of the Griffin family", but then, after a few seconds of silence, Peter turns to the camera and says to the audience "We had the abortion", promptly ending the episode.

== Production and development ==
The episode was first announced at the 2009 San Diego Comic-Con on July 25, 2009, by series creator and executive producer Seth MacFarlane. It was written by fellow executive producer and series regular Danny Smith and directed by Joseph Lee, during the show's eighth production season. The storyline was pitched by series regular Tom Devanney, and periodically references Billions and Billions (1997), a book of essays by Carl Sagan. Seth MacFarlane asked Danny Smith to read Sagan's essay, "Abortion: Is It Possible to Be Both 'Pro-Life' and 'Pro-Choice'", before beginning to write the script. The episode was originally intended to air along with the rest of the eighth season schedule, and was approved for production by 20th Century Fox. However, the Fox Broadcasting Company asserted their right not to air the episode due to the subject matter. This was the second time that MacFarlane had been warned by Fox about the sensitive nature of an episode's subject. Previously, Fox had also disapproved of the season 3 episode "When You Wish Upon a Weinstein", which was originally prevented from airing on Fox due to concerns that the episode's content could be interpreted as antisemitic. The episode later aired on Adult Swim in 2003 and Fox in 2004. Thinking the same would happen with "Partial Terms of Endearment", MacFarlane believed that Fox would eventually run the episode on their network, stating, "Most of the time these things turn out to be nothing." In a statement released by Fox, they noted their full support of "the producers' right to make the episode and distribute it in whatever way they want."

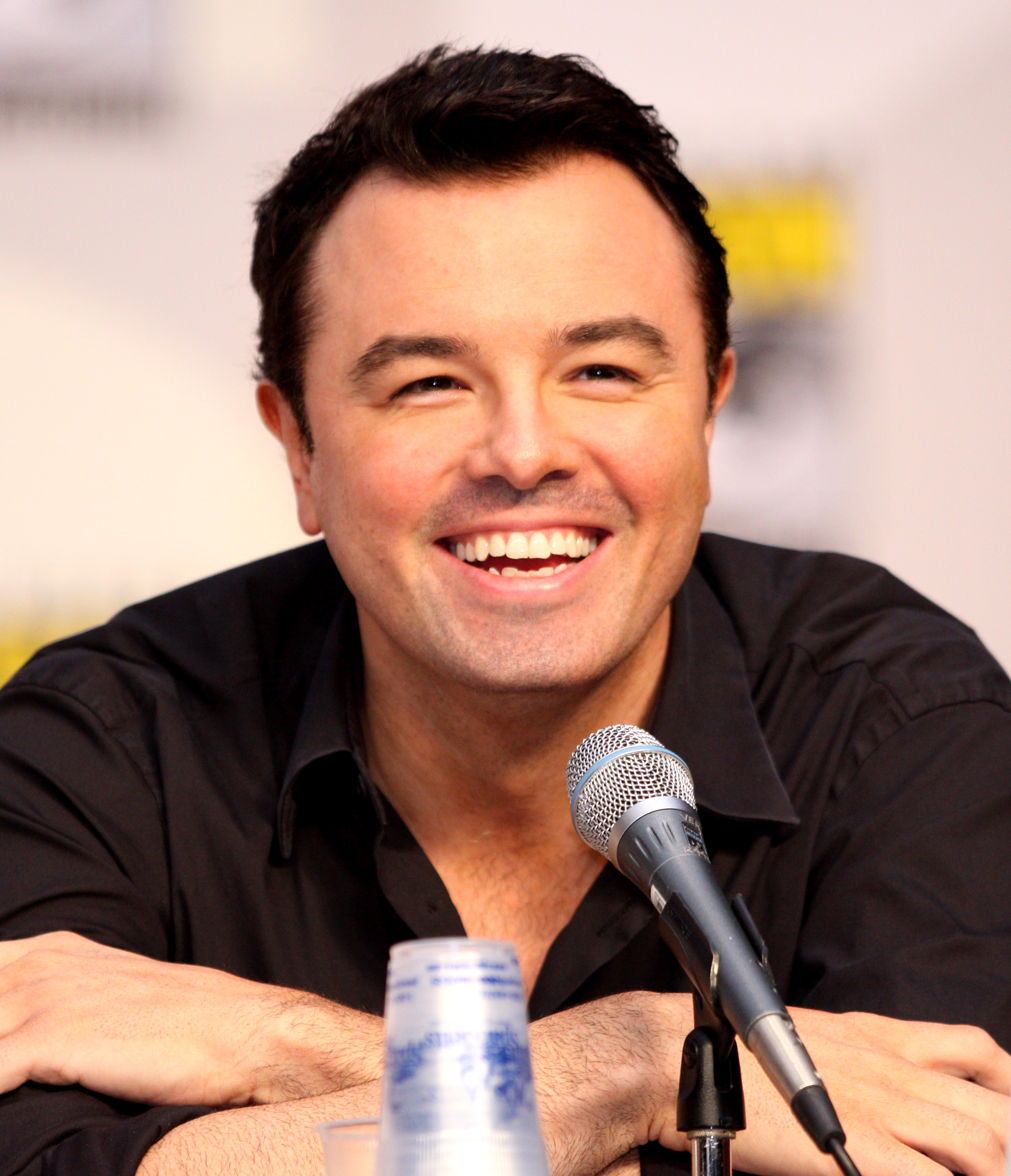
Series' creator Seth MacFarlane announced on July 25, 2009, at San Diego Comic-Con that the episode had been banned by Fox.

At the 2009 San Diego Comic-Con, MacFarlane announced that the episode would become available on a special DVD release, with series producer Kara Vallow confirming the release would be available on September 28, 2010, along with Seth and Alex's Almost Live Comedy Show. A month after the announcement, Kevin Reilly, President of Fox Entertainment, stated that the final decision not to air the episode was largely due to concerns about finances and advertisers: "Of all the issues, [abortion] is the one that seems to be the most of a hot button. Particularly at that moment in time, the economy was really struggling and there were a lot of very tough conversations going on with clients." Reilly said that "the advertisers know what they’re getting" with Family Guy, and he thought that the episode handled the subject fine, but "this one felt like it could cause trouble, and it was just not worth it." Despite the concerns in the U.S. about the episode, it aired on June 20, 2010, on BBC Three in the UK, as a part of the season's regularly scheduled Sunday night run on the station. Although it was originally speculated that Adult Swim might air the episode, Adult Swim stated that there were no plans to air it on their network. Several months before the episode debuted on television, the script was performed in a live table read at the Ricardo Montalbán Theatre in Hollywood, California on August 12, 2009. The special reading was attended by Academy of Television Arts and Sciences voters on the heels of the 61st Primetime Emmy Awards. Family Guy was nominated for Outstanding Comedy Series, becoming the first animated program to be nominated in the category since The Flintstones in 1961. Commenting about the event, MacFarlane said, "We did this to drum up Emmy votes, so we could lose by fewer votes."

In addition to the regular cast, actor Jackson Douglas, then-husband of Alex Borstein, appeared in the episode as Dale Robinson, actress Julia Sweeney appeared as Naomi Robinson, actress Rutina Wesley appeared as Cheryl, actor Wil Wheaton cameoed as an anti-abortion protester and actor Michael York voiced the nature narrator. Actor Gary Beach, voice actor Phil LaMarr, and comedian/actor Will Sasso guest starred as various characters. Recurring guest voice actress Alexandra Breckenridge, actor Ralph Garman, and writers Danny Smith, Alec Sulkin and John Viener made minor appearances throughout the episode. Recurring guest cast member Patrick Warburton guest appeared in the episode as well. This episode marked Sweeney's first guest appearance since the season two episode "Wasted Talent".

"Partial Terms of Endearment", along with Seth and Alex Almost-Live Comedy Show, was released on DVD in the United States on September 28, 2010. The set includes a brief audio commentary by Seth MacFarlane, voice actress Alex Borstein, writer Danny Smith and director Joseph Lee, as well as animatics, a table read of the episode, and nine downloadable original Family Guy songs. It was also released for digital retail in the United States the same day without the bonus features included on the DVD.

Clips from the episode were shown during the special Family Guy: 200 Episodes Later, in which MacFarlane describes it as being the closest the writers have come to doing a modern-day All in the Family episode. Additionally, Smith calls it a relatively balanced and intelligent discussion of a very difficult subject and Sulkin claims that it, like "When You Wish Upon a Weinstein", is not controversial at all. Following the arrival of the series on Disney+ in selected territories as part of Star in February 2021, the episode was omitted, being the only Family Guy episode with this distinction.

== Cultural references ==
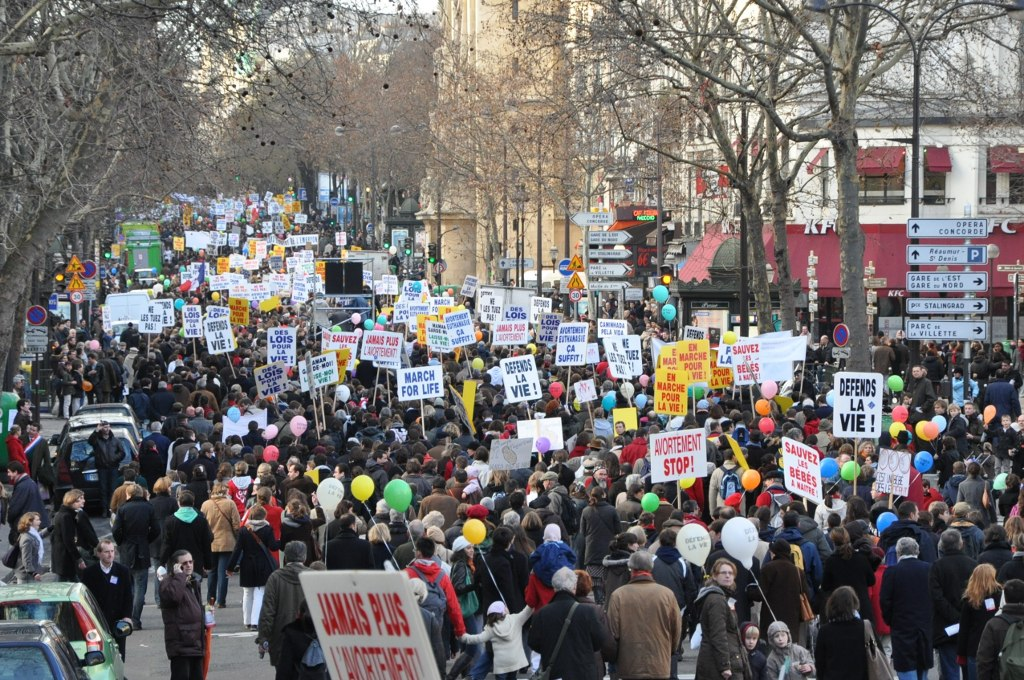
The episode parodied pro-life protesters.

In the opening scene of the episode, Peter and Lois are shown entering her alma mater at Salve Regina University in Newport, Rhode Island. Later, after they are approached by Lois's ex-roommate Naomi and her husband Dale, Lois announces her intention to carry the couple's baby, causing Peter to question why Lois is the one who has to become the couple's surrogate. Their daughter, Meg, suggests that she could carry the baby herself, but Lois objects due to Meg's inability to have a boyfriend "for more than a few weeks." Meg notes her relationship with Sesame Street character Count von Count, who only left her after discovering she had at least three nipples.

Before Lois prepares to undergo in vitro fertilization, Dr. Hartman shows her several photos of babies conceived by celebrity couples, including actress Shelley Duvall and singer-songwriter James Blunt; actress Hilary Swank and actor Gary Busey; Olympic medalist Florence Griffith-Joyner and physicist Stephen Hawking; and actress, writer and comedian Tina Fey and actor Joaquin Phoenix. Beginning the procedure, Lois objects to Dr. Hartman's method of embryonic insertion. In response, he replies, "Well, perhaps you could tell them—if only you spoke Hovitos," a reference to Raiders of the Lost Ark. Later, in an attempt to cause Lois to have a miscarriage, Peter lays down a series of Grey's Anatomy DVDs in order to lure Lois into being punched in the stomach by the "Acme Miscarriage Kit", a boxing glove attached to a crossbow. In a reference to the Looney Tunes and Merrie Melodies cartoons featuring Wile E. Coyote and Road Runner, Peter ultimately ends up missing with the crossbow, causing the glove to bounce and hit a large rock and land inches in front of him as he is standing on a narrow cliff. The ground then drops out from underneath his feet, causing him to fall like Wile E. Coyote.

As Peter exits the abortion clinic, he notices an anti-abortion rally nearby. At the rally, a protester shows Peter a video tape discouraging abortion (as a reference to the cult classic 1936 American propaganda exploitation film Reefer Madness), portraying it as murder, larceny, jaywalking and securities fraud. The tape claims that abortion prevented Nazi leader Adolf Hitler's would-be assassin, a fourth Stooge brother, of The Three Stooges, and Islamic extremist Osama bin Laden's America-loving brother from being born.

== Reception ==
The episode was viewed in just under a million homes in its original airing on BBC Three in the United Kingdom, earning an audience share of 5.7 percent, despite airing simultaneously with Desperate Housewives on E4. The reception of the episode represented a slight decrease from the previous week's ratings.

Reviews of the episode's release on DVD were mostly positive, calling the episode "wickedly funny, no matter how offensive." Frazier Moore of the Associated Press commented that "What, in other hands, could have been a serious, even heart-wrenching story is on Family Guy a devilish burlesque — not to mention a wickedly astute examination of the current abortion clash." Moore also noted, however, that "the uninitiated, the faint-of-heart and, most of all, the anti-abortion crowd should maybe choose to take a pass." Dave Itzkoff of The New York Times deemed the episode "typical of that audacious Fox animated comedy, teeming with rapid-fire jokes and willfully offensive non sequiturs about disabled animals, God, Nazis, bodily functions and the sexual habits of 'Sesame Street' characters." In a slightly more mixed review of the DVD release, Cindy White of IGN criticized the episode for its shock value, but appreciated "that the writers didn't cop out in the end, and actually picked a side." White went on to comment that it was "hard to believe that the writers ever expected 'Partial Terms of Endearment' to make it to air" and that "even devoted, longtime fans of the show may be a little uncomfortable with the subject matter." White gave the release a 7 out of 10 rating. Assessing Family Guy's impact on television, Mary Elizabeth Williams of Salon commented on the portrayal of abortion: "That Family Guy, that doofy, generally unfunny bastion of sophomoric jokes, should be one of the few shows brave enough to even address the topic is bananas [...] And that Fox wouldn't air the episode says we're still a long way from having anybody on 'Glee' or 'The Office' or 'House' look at those telltale lines on the stick and finally decide what millions of American women have — that they're just not ready for motherhood."
