= Deep Throats =

- Family Guy episode
- Episode no.: Season 4 Episode 23
- Directed by: Greg Colton
- Written by: Alex Borstein
- Production code: 4ACX26
- Original air date: April 9, 2006

Guest appearances
- H. Jon Benjamin as Carl; Frank Welker as Kermit the Frog and Fred Jones in the DVD version; Kate Jackson as Mrs. King

Episode chronology
← Previous "Sibling Rivalry"	Next → "Peterotica"
- Family Guy season 4

"Deep Throats" is the 23rd episode of season four of the television series Family Guy. The episode aired on Fox on April 9, 2006. It was written by Alex Borstein and directed by Greg Colton. Appalled at parking charges introduced by Mayor West, Brian decides to expose the corruption of the Mayor, despite the prospect of potentially destroying Meg's new career as the Mayor's intern. Meanwhile, Peter and Lois decide to participate in the Quahog community talent show with a folk singing act, as they did in the 1980s, but the couple becomes largely reliant on marijuana for inspiration and eventually fail the competition for their poor performance, despite their belief that they were singing well when under the influence of the drugs.

== Plot ==
Meg is employed as an intern for Mayor West after doing an interview with him. The family is impressed by this news, and Brian feels pressured that he is becoming the "new Meg" due to him not having a job. Brian decides to become a taxicab driver, but soon becomes intent on exposing the corruption of Mayor West after receiving a $400 parking ticket for parking his taxi in a handicapped zone. When discussing his corruption beliefs with Meg, she argues that Mayor West is a nice person and that Brian should drop it. Stewie, after learning of Brian's intentions, decides to help. After meeting in a parking lot with a whistleblower, Kermit the Frog, Brian discovers where Mayor West will be that night, and follows him to a motel with Stewie.

Spying on West through the motel wall, they discover he is in a romantic relationship with Meg. Seeing this as an ideal opportunity to take West down, Brian photographs the two together in romantic scenes and threatens to reveal them to the press. After Meg finds out, she confronts West, who decides to break up with her due to the negative press, adding that even though he is used to it, he does not want Meg's life to be ruined, stating how much he really cares about her. Brian, having secretly heard this, realizes he has made a mistake, destroys the photos, and apologizes to Meg for losing sight of what was really important. His taxicab, however, is destroyed by Cleveland, believing Brian refused to give him a ride.

Meanwhile, Peter and Lois decide to participate in a community talent show with a folk-singing act they did in the 1980s. They have a hard time, however, writing new songs and start to smoke marijuana for inspiration, annoying the family. At one point, Peter rips out a piece of his guitar with his teeth and eats it, and him and Lois lie on the sofa naked in front of Brian and Stewie. Smoking before the show, they initially appear to wow the entire crowd with their performance, but, later, they realize that they lost. Chris, having watched the show, reveals that they were completely high and too disoriented to actually sing their song. He then preaches the dangers of marijuana to Lois and Peter.

== Production ==
It was originally intended for Mayor West to beat Meg up when she is applying for a job within his office, but the scene was never used. The clay cars sketch was not animated by the regular show producers, rather it was drawn by Eileen Colehep, a woman who attended college with show producer Seth MacFarlane. The voice of Bruce the performance artist was performed by Mike Henry, and was originally scheduled to last longer, but it was reduced for unknown reasons. The concept behind the storyline of Peter and Lois performing in pubs when they were younger relates to MacFarlane's father, who used to do stage performances in bars. When he was performing, the woman who was to be MacFarlane's mother, came into the bar and tracked his father down, asking for guitar lessons once she had found him. The song which Peter and Lois were singing when remembering their performances they hosted in their earlier years was created by Alec Sulkin and Patrick Megan, producers of Family Guy. Alex Borstein, voice actor of Lois Griffin had originally wanted Meg to be wearing a business outfit in the episode during her employment by Mayor West, but it was not used.

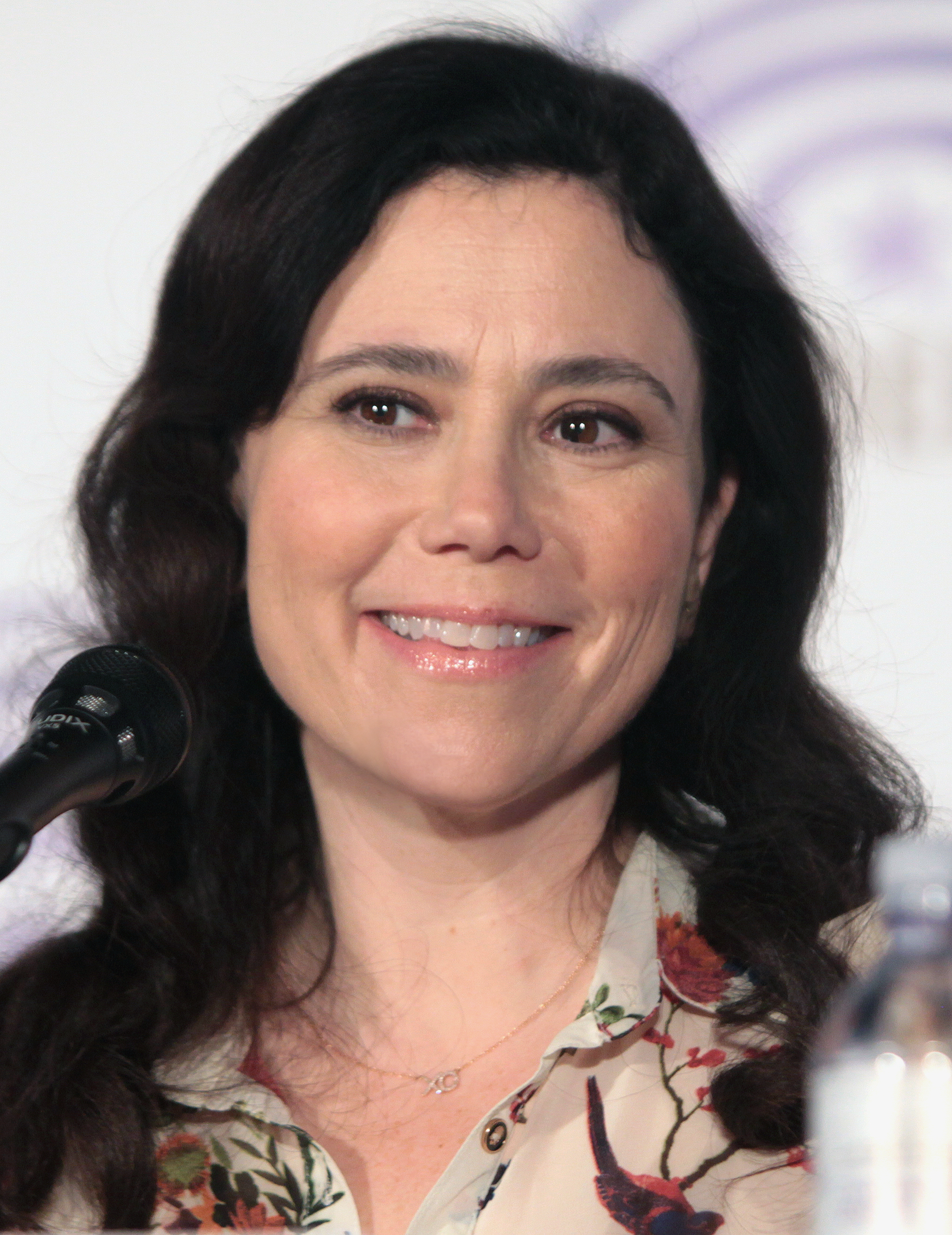
Alex Borstein wrote the episode.

The episode marks the first time in the series that Stewie has expressed an attraction for Brian. The name of Peter and Lois' band was originally intended to be "Mouthful of Peter," but broadcasting standards insisted that the show producers change the name to "Handful of Peter." In response to this, MacFarlane comments that "a handjob is more acceptable than a blowjob." When performing for the Quahog Talent Competition, one of the lyrics to Peter and Lois' song was scheduled to be "God would do her from behind, even do it a second time," but it was never used. Sound mixer Patrick Clark organized the format of the credits, which were different from the regular set.

Peter singing "Ding Fries are Done" was shortened for the televised version of the episode, with an extended version on the DVD. Cleveland sticking his middle finger up to Brian after he fails to stop in his taxi was allowed on the televised version of the episode. This was permitted because MacFarlane rang the show's broadcasting standards and asked for their explicit permission, explaining that it was very distant, and they allowed it. After smoking marijuana, Peter and Lois are shown lying on top of each other on the sofa; in the television version, they are wearing underwear, but are completely naked on the DVD, Adult Swim, and TBS versions. Similarly, Lois' comment during the scene, "Brian, he's knocking on the back door, what should I do? Should I let him in?" was censored from Fox airings, as it is a reference to anal sex, but remains intact on Adult Swim and TBS airings.

In addition to the regular cast, voice actors H. Jon Benjamin and Frank Welker, and actress Kate Jackson guest starred in the episode. Recurring voice actors Lori Alan, Ralph Garman, and Mike Henry, writers Chris Sheridan, Danny Smith, and John Viener, and actor Adam West, who portrays an exaggerated version of himself, also made minor appearances.

== Cultural references ==
The episode takes its title from a scene when an anonymous informant (later revealed to be Kermit the Frog) secretly meets Brian in an underground parking lot. Brian calls the informant "Deep Throat," in a reference to the anonymous informant Deep Throat. The meeting itself is a reference to either the meeting with Deep Throat or to the 1976 film All the President's Men. The part-time job Peter had wherein he sings a song "Ding Fries are Done," was based on a song that was popularized by Doctor Demento in the 1990s concerning Burger King, and is a parody of the popular Christmas song "Carol of the Bells". The Noid attempting to ruin Mayor West's pizza is a reference to the Noid from former Domino's Pizza television advertisements. The scene where Cleveland runs off as a black panther when he notices Meg and Brian looking at him as he destroys Brian's cab with a crowbar is a reference to Michael Jackson's "Black or White" second ending known as the Panther Dance. Stewie references his cousin, Stewie Cruise, showing him jumping up and down on Oprah's couch while shouting "I'm in love with Katie Holmes! I'm not gay!" When Lois mentions to Peter that it would be fun to be in the community talent show, Stewie says "You know what else is fun? Watching Mr. Belvedere without people talking so loudly!". He then proceeds to sing the theme song loudly. When Peter is being driven around by Brian, he refers to him as Bitterman, a reference to the chauffeur in the 1981 film Arthur. The song Mayor West and Meg are listening to in the hotel together is the theme song to Teenage Mutant Ninja Turtles from the 1987 series. In the DVD version of the episode, Stewie and Brian bump into Scooby-Doo and the gang from Scooby-Doo, Where Are You?. Fred Jones and Stewie argue about who got to City Hall first, but then Stewie sends them off by humming a familiar tune.
