= You May Now Kiss the... Uh... Guy Who Receives =

- Family Guy episode
- Promotional image, featuring Brian and his gay cousin Jasper at the airport.
- Episode no.: Season 4 Episode 25
- Directed by: Dominic Polcino
- Written by: David A. Goodman
- Production code: 4ACX28
- Original air date: April 30, 2006

Guest appearances
- Michael Clarke Duncan as Boy on mushrooms; Ralph Garman; Rachael MacFarlane; Chad Morgan as Alyssa; The Proclaimers as themselves; Kevin Michael Richardson as Chris on mushrooms; Stark Sands as Justin Hackeysack; Uncredited: Curtis Armstrong as Dudley Dawson (Deleted Scenes)

Episode chronology
| ← Previous "Peterotica" | Next → "Petergeist" |
- Family Guy season 4

"You May Now Kiss the... Uh... Guy Who Receives" is the 25th episode of the fourth season of Family Guy. The episode originally aired on April 30, 2006, on Fox. In the episode, Brian's gay cousin Jasper comes to Quahog with his boyfriend Ricardo to get married. Mayor Adam West tries to ban same-sex marriage to divert attention from a bad investment he made with the taxpayers' money. Brian fights for gay marriage and ends up taking Mayor West hostage to get his view across.

The episode was written by David A. Goodman and directed by Dominic Polcino. The episode received positive reviews from critics. The week it aired, the episode had an estimated 7.8 million viewers. The episode features guest performances from Michael Clarke Duncan, Ralph Garman, Rachael MacFarlane, Chad Morgan, Charles Reid, Craig Reid, Kevin Michael Richardson, and Stark Sands, as well as several recurring voice actors for the series.

== Plot ==
Brian's gay cousin Jasper comes to Quahog with his Filipino boyfriend Ricardo, and he announces that they are going to get married. Everyone is delighted — except for Lois, who is against same-sex marriage. Later, Mayor Adam West reveals in the city center a solid gold statue of the Honey Smacks mascot Dig 'Em, and dedicates the statue to the servicemen who died in what he refers to as the "recent Gulf conflict". The cost of the statue puts the city in debt. In order to distract the angered townspeople, he proposes a bill outlawing same-sex marriage. Meanwhile, Chris falls for Alyssa, a beautiful girl who belongs to the Young Republicans, and joins the group to impress her.

An enraged Brian vows to make West change his mind, getting 10,000 people to sign a petition to oppose the bill. Lois refuses to sign and takes Stewie to visit her parents. Before Brian can present the petition to the mayor, Chris burns it because Alyssa has offered to let him touch her breasts if he destroys the document, much to Brian's anger. Brian manages to get 10,000 more signatures on a new petition to show to Mayor West, but West refuses to change his mind and throws the petition out of his office window. Out of desperation, Brian takes a security guard's gun, and holds the mayor hostage.

Lois hears about Brian on TV, and then discovers that her parents do not love each other, and even raised her to believe that heterosexuals who hate each other have every right to marry while homosexuals who love each other don't. Horrified, Lois changes her mind on same-sex marriage, deciding that gay couples who love each other have the right to be together. She returns to Quahog to convince Brian to free the mayor, saying that if he pursues this any further, he will be hurting his own cause. Brian agrees, and ends the hostage situation. Since it has distracted the town from the Dig 'Em scandal, Mayor West agrees to drop the ban on gay marriage. Mayor West also agrees to drop the hostage charges against Brian in exchange for a key for a Volkswagen Scirocco (which Stewie discovered at his grandparents' house). Jasper and Ricardo get married in the backyard of the Griffin house, with West himself conducting the ceremony.

== Production ==
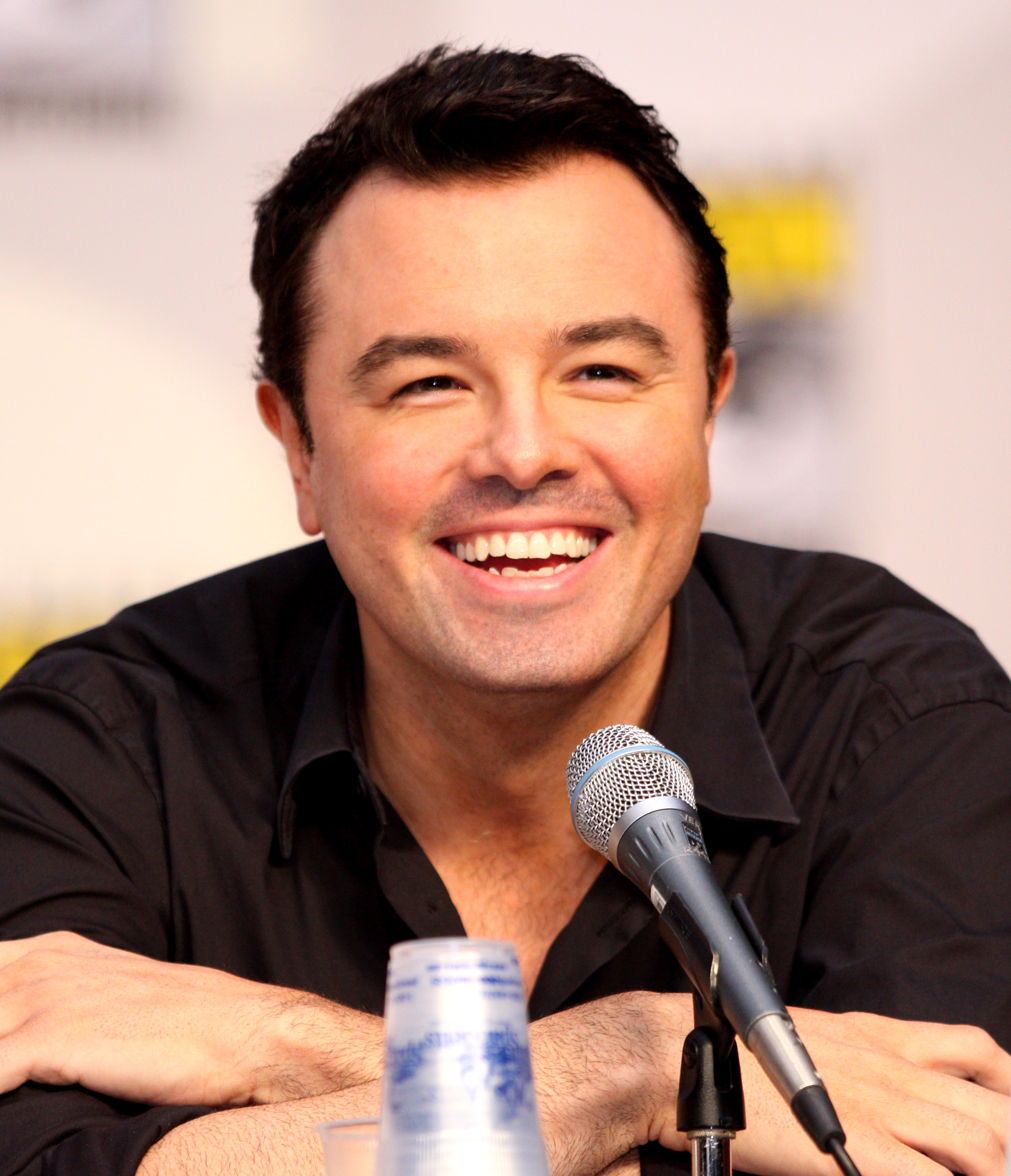
MacFarlane came up with the idea for the episode while writing a pilot episode with two gay men.

Written by David A. Goodman, and directed by Dominic Polcino, series creator Seth MacFarlane came up with the idea for the episode while writing a pilot episode featuring two gay men. MacFarlane describes himself as "incredibly passionate about [his] support for the gay community", and finds it to be "infuriating and idiotic" that two gay partners "have to go through this fucking dog and pony act when they stop at a hotel and the guy behind the counter says, 'You want one room or two?'"

In addition to the regular cast, Michael Clarke Duncan, Ralph Garman, Rachael MacFarlane, Chad Morgan, Charles Reid, Craig Reid, Kevin Michael Richardson and Stark Sands guest starred in the episode. Recurring guest voices include Lori Alan, Alex Breckenridge, Johnny Brennan, writer Mike Henry, writer Chris Sheridan, writer Danny Smith, writer John Viener, and actor Adam West, who portrays an exaggerated version of himself. Actor Patrick Warburton has a guest appearance as well.

Censor issues required multiple changes to the episode. The line when Peter says, "It's not like we're going to have a gay sex orgy in the living room," was originally, "Come on Lois, we're not going to drill glory holes in the living room." The show received a broadcast standards request that the anti-gay video the priest shows Lois say "Pat Robertson Industries," so as not to make it look like Fox had an opinion about homosexuals. The writers had a problem with Lois being against gay marriage, as they felt they were not portraying her in a way that is consistent with other episodes as she expressed a more liberal viewpoint on many past issues on the show and even expressed a generally more accepting view of gays in the episode Brian Sings and Swings. The DVD version has a deleted scene during the backyard wedding ending where Ricardo (who doesn't speak English) asks Stewie what's going on and Stewie (who speaks Tagalog) tells Ricardo that he'll find out on his wedding night.

== Cultural references ==
Mayor West builds a statue of Dig 'Em, the Sugar Smacks mascot, which causes controversy and causes West to ban gay marriage. Stewie takes over air traffic control, and causes Matthew McConaughey's private plane to crash into the ocean. The film The Sound of Music is also referenced in the episode. West also swallowed a Stratego board game and an older issue of People magazine which features the actor Paul Hogan. A cutaway gag involves Peter in the band The Proclaimers, in a recording for the song "I'm Gonna Be (500 Miles)", while another involves Popeye at Dr. Hartman's office, where he is told his bulging forearms are full of tumors and his speech patterns are the result of a stroke.

== Reception ==
"You May Now Kiss the... Uh... Guy Who Receives" had an average of 7.82 million viewers and ranked 82nd out of 215 programs airing that week. Bob Sassone from TV Squad wrote that he could not stop laughing throughout the episode, feeling that there is "just something really funny about gay dogs getting married and a giant gold statue of Dig 'Em, the Sugar Smacks mascot". While reviewing the Family Guy: Volume 4 DVD, Nancy Basile of About.com called the episode "sharp".
