= Junk drawer =

Drawer for unrelated possibly useful objects

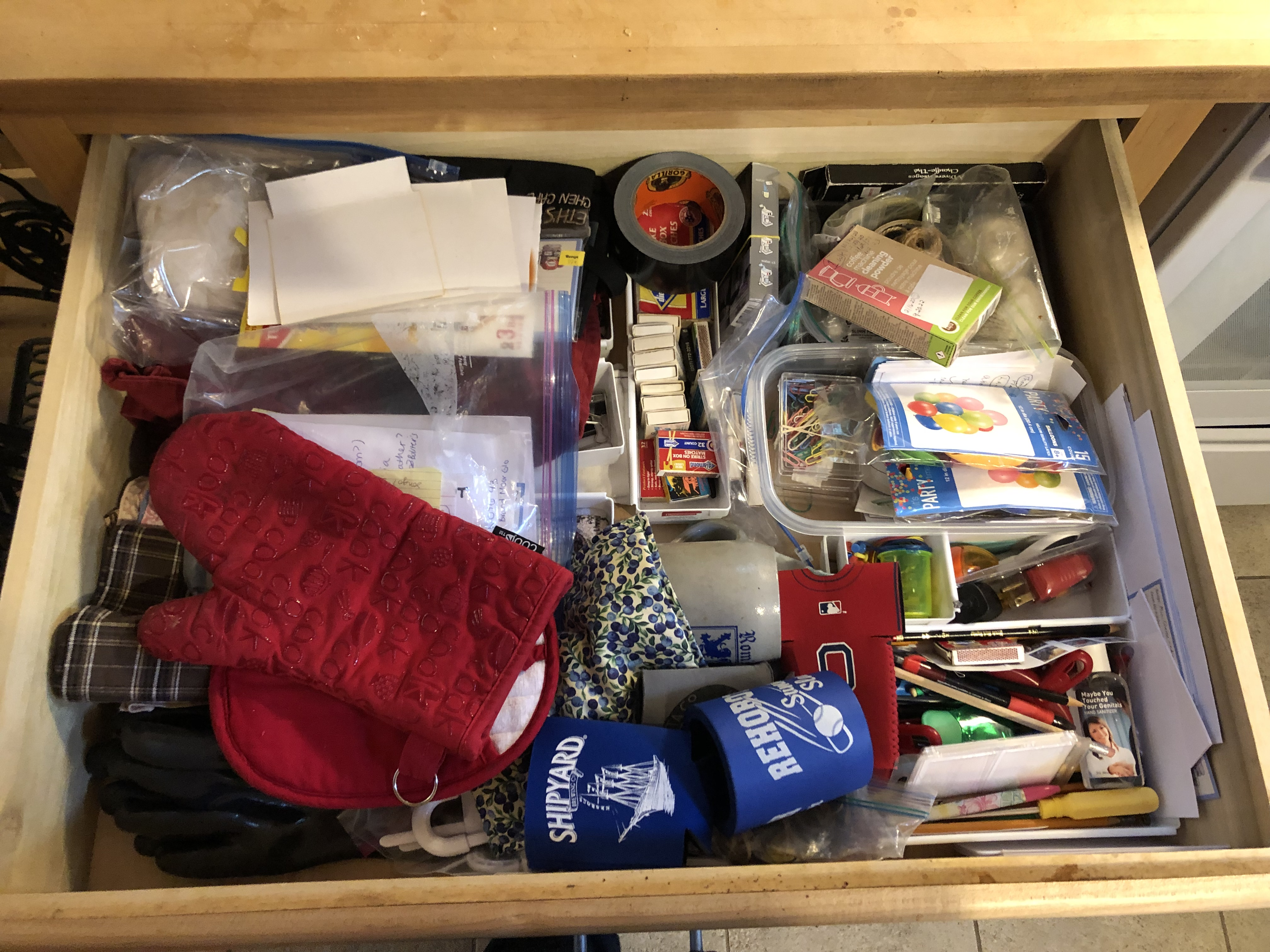
A junk drawer in a residential kitchen.

A junk drawer or junkdrawer is a drawer used for storing small, miscellaneous, occasionally useful objects of little to no (or unclear) monetary value, and possibly significant sentimental value. Junk drawers are often located in residential kitchens, but they may exist anywhere with cabinetry or furniture used for storage, including home offices or workshops, and even commercial workplaces and businesses. The phrase "junk drawer" appears to be an Americanism dating to the early 1900s.

== Typical contents ==
Junk drawers often contain various types of unrelated and unorganized objects, such as small commonly used tools like screwdrivers, pliers, tape measures, scissors, glue, sandpaper, birthday candles, and pens; small, loose, hard-to-store items like thumbtacks, binder clips, toothpicks, rubber bands, batteries, and safety pins; stationery and crafting materials; "leftover" objects of uncertain or forgotten origin like "orphaned" board game pieces, bottle caps, and old electronics chargers; coins and receipts; medication and bandages; or even objects with sentimental value such as souvenirs and love letters.

== Etymology and history ==
The Oxford English Dictionary dates the first use of the phrase to a 1912 article in The Journal of the Allied Societies, which recommends the use of "a 5/8-inch sandpaper disk cutter, if you happen to have one in the junk drawer".

== In popular culture ==
American novelist John R. Powers published a book titled The Junk Drawer, Corner Store, Front Porch Blues in 1992.
