= I Take Thee Quagmire =

- Family Guy episode
- Episode no.: Season 4 Episode 21
- Directed by: Seth Kearsley
- Written by: Tom Maxwell; Don Woodard; Steve Callaghan
- Production code: 4ACX23
- Original air date: March 12, 2006

Guest appearances
- Adam Carolla as Death; Stephan Cox; Bryan Cranston as Hal; Darrel Heath; Beth Littleford; Christy Carlson Romano as Quagmire's One-Night Stand; Nicole Sullivan as Joan; Fred Tatasciore as Construction Worker; Alex Thomas; Alex Trebek as himself

Episode chronology
← Previous "Patriot Games"	Next → "Sibling Rivalry"
- Family Guy season 4

"I Take Thee Quagmire" is the 21st episode of season four of Family Guy, originally broadcast March 12, 2006, on Fox. In this episode, Peter wins free maid service for a week; he intentionally creates extra work for the maid, Joan. Quagmire meets her and instantly falls in love with her, leading him to propose to her after the second date. After the marriage, Quagmire comes to regret his new relationship, but learns that Joan will kill him and herself if he leaves her, so he fakes his own death.

The episode was written by Tom Maxwell, Don Woodard and Steve Callaghan and directed by Seth Kearsley. It received mostly positive reviews from critics for its storyline and many cultural references. According to Nielsen ratings, it was viewed in 8.06 million homes in its original airing. The episode featured guest performances by Adam Carolla, Stephan Cox, Bryan Cranston, Darrel Heath, Beth Littleford, Christy Carlson Romano, Nicole Sullivan, Fred Tatasciore, Alex Thomas, and Alex Trebek, as well as several recurring voice actors for the series.

== Plot ==
Peter Griffin becomes a contestant on Wheel of Fortune. He confuses host Pat Sajak with Regis Philbin. Despite choosing Z, 4, three Qs, and the Batman symbol as his letters in the bonus round, he wins with his "shot in the dark" answer. Among his prizes, he chooses one week of free maid service. Peter abuses the maid, Joan, by having her extract ancient objects from his navel, including an obsolete video game console and a carton of cigarettes. He also rides her like a horse to a store. On Joan's last day, Peter fills a watermelon with pudding and firecrackers, requiring her to clean the mess. Peter introduces Joan to Quagmire, who falls in love with her. Quagmire proposes marriage after dating her briefly. The Griffins and Swansons are invited to dinner at Quagmire's house, and find Quagmire's personality had changed to mirror Joan's. Peter presents Quagmire with one of the Statue of Liberty's feet as a wedding present, to stimulate Quagmire's foot fetish, but Quagmire rejects it. Peter unsuccessfully tries to tempt Quagmire with pornography.

Meanwhile, Lois decides to wean Stewie from breastfeeding because his teeth cause her pain. Consequently, Lois' breasts are very large by the time of Joan and Quagmire's wedding. At the reception, her blouse rips open. Peter notices that Quagmire is staring at Lois' breasts, and he deliberately spills champagne on them. Peter tries to dry Lois by shaking her, jiggling her breasts. Quagmire becomes aroused and realizes that marrying Joan is a mistake. Later, at home, Quagmire tells Joan that some of his friends think they should get a divorce. Joan is incensed and threatens to injure herself with a kitchen knife. To get Quagmire out of his quagmire, Peter announces they will fake Quagmire's death.

Peter, Joe and Cleveland tell Joan that Quagmire is dead, and as proof show her a hopelessly unconvincing video tape in which Quagmire is attacked by a ninja (obviously Joe), a Nazi (obviously Cleveland), and a "pots and pans robot" (Peter). Peter explains they can't show her the body because it was eaten by a dinosaur (an equally unconvincing toy being visibly manipulated in the video by Peter's hand). Joan is disgusted by the charade. Quagmire returns home and fakes a fatal heart attack, which Joan finds convincing. The plan requires that Quagmire be buried with enough oxygen to last until after the funeral, when Peter and Cleveland will dig him out. However, Mayor West's irrational fear of a zombie apocalypse has led to new legislation, requiring all new burials to be encased in concrete during the ceremony, and Peter is forced to stop the funeral to rescue Quagmire. Death shows up to retrieve Quagmire. Joan pleads for Quagmire's life and grabs Death by the arm, causing her to drop dead instantly. Peter talks Death into taking Joan instead, as "she was suicidal and her last name is Quagmire." Quagmire asks Death to let him have the body for five minutes, and he returns to his usual horndog personality.

Meanwhile, Stewie has been having drug-like withdrawals since Lois decided to wean him. He becomes so desperate that when he and Lois are at the park, he takes the place of another baby being breastfed. He tries to milk Lois in her sleep, but spills the milk on the floor. Stewie realizes how pathetic he is and accepts his weaning. However, Lois misses the bonding and decides to start breastfeeding again.

This episode ends with a frame memorializing Don Knotts.

== Production ==
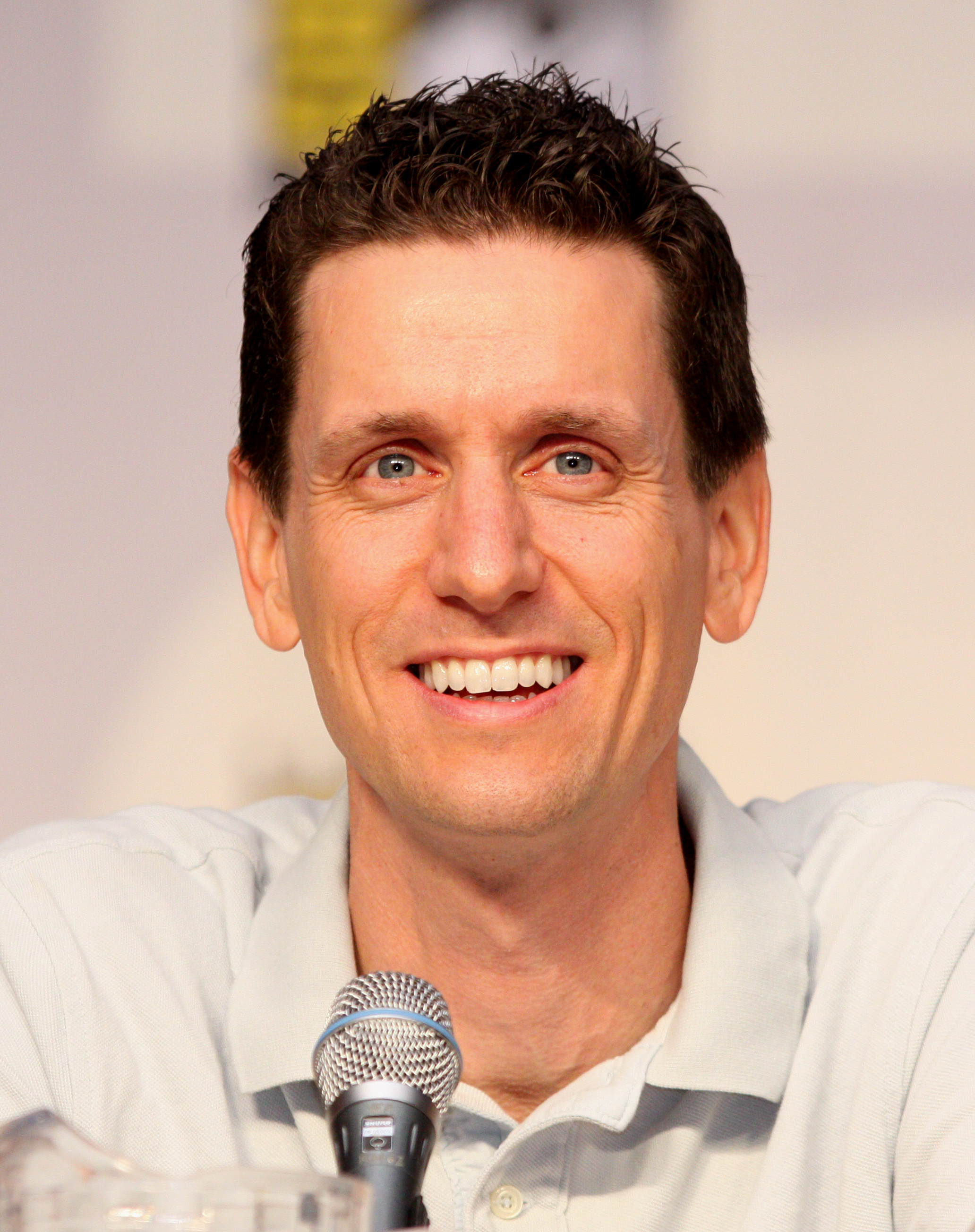
Steve Callaghan wrote the episode, along with Tom Maxwell and Don Woodard. "I Take Thee Quagmire" is the only episode of Family Guy that Maxwell and Woodard wrote.

This episode starts by depicting the game show Wheel of Fortune. When Brian is watching Malcolm in the Middle on television, a scene begins showing Lois screaming at sons Malcolm, Reese, and Dewey and husband Hal. Jane Kaczmarek was asked to reprise her character, but she refused. MacFarlane said that he got a message that Kaczmarek wishes to portray that character as likable. During that scene, Hal was voiced by Bryan Cranston. Seth MacFarlane comments that "this is the first real Quagmire story we've ever done." A scene was made of Stewie attending a meeting similar to those at Alcoholics Anonymous; however, the meeting was designed for those who are addicted to breast milk. The format of Wheel of Fortune is somewhat similar to the that of the modern-day program, but the scene features elements no longer part of the show, such as being given R, S, T, L, N, and E, which was a feature in the 1980s.

Two scenes during this episode were censored for television broadcast. When Quagmire meets Joan and invites her out on a date, Cleveland asks, "Is that a banana in your pocket, or an erection in your pocket?" Although this entire scene was not censored, Fox Broadcasting Company bleeped "erection", which, according to DVD commentary, made what Cleveland said sound worse than what was intended. The scene where Peter is promoting 'Crystal Pepsi' was shown only on the DVD, because it is prohibited to promote one product over another on television.

There is also a scene after the watermelon exploding trick where Meg was supposed to say "Fuck you, asshole! I'll kick your ass to hell!", but Fox replaced the line with, "I hate you! I hate you!" instead.

In addition to the regular cast, Adam Carolla, Stephan Cox, Bryan Cranston, Darrel Heath, Beth Littleford, Christy Carlson Romano, Nicole Sullivan, Fred Tatasciore, Alex Thomas, and game show host Alex Trebek guest starred in the episode. Recurring voice actors Ralph Garman, Mike Henry, writer Danny Smith, actress Jennifer Tilly, and writer John Viener made minor appearances in the episode. Recurring guest voice actors Patrick Warburton and Adam West made appearances in the episode as well.

== Cultural references ==
In the opening scene of the episode, Peter is shown playing on the gameshow Wheel of Fortune, with hosts Pat Sajak and Vanna White also appearing. When Mayor West is playing as a contestant on Jeopardy!, he spells the name of the host, Alex Trebek, backwards (Kebert Xela), sending him back to the fifth dimension; this is a reference to when DC Comics supervillain and nemesis to Superman, Mister Mxyzptlk, is sent to the fifth dimension when someone makes him say his own name backwards. A Family Guy fan later did this in a real life episode of Jeopardy!

When Peter and the children are flying through space and singing, this is a reference to The Great Space Coaster. The two Asian men who meet Peter at the traffic lights when riding Joan's back speak in a very similar tone to Howard Cosell, a reference to the 1985 cult film Better Off Dead.

When Quagmire fantasizes about being alone in the forest with Joan and speaking to her in Elvish, this is a reference to a scene from The Lord of the Rings; Quagmire goes on to imagine himself with Joan dancing dressed as the title characters from Beauty and the Beast, eating a plate of spaghetti similar to that shown in Lady and the Tramp, and flying on a magic carpet dressed as Aladdin and Princess Jasmine. They also fly through Baghdad, which is in ruins from the US/British invasion.

Adam West's response to seeing the Statue of Liberty is taken from the original Planet of the Apes. Also, there is a scene where Brian watches Malcolm in the Middle. In the scene, Lois nags the boys so much that she will go on strike, so Hal ends up killing her with a refrigerator door and walks away blissfully with the boys. Twice during the episode Quagmire engraves his name with his nose much like Woody Woodpecker. In the end, he engraves "giggity giggity goo" in the same fashion.

== Reception ==
Bob Sassone of TV Squad commented that "this episode had one of the more hysterical/disturbing images of this TV season: Lois flashing her breasts to Brian after giving Stewie his lunch." Michael Drucker of IGN noted that "the volume four episodes are easily funnier than the volume three ones", referring to the episode. Tom Eames of entertainment website Digital Spy placed the episode at number four on his listing of the best Family Guy episodes in order of "yukyukyuks" and described the episode as "dark and horrible, but brilliant." He added that the episode was "one of the first episodes to showcase just how ridiculously awful [Quagmire] could be."
