= Sibling Rivalry (Family Guy) =

- Family Guy episode
- Episode no.: Season 4 Episode 22
- Directed by: Dan Povenmire
- Written by: Cherry Chevapravatdumrong
- Production code: 4ACX24
- Original air date: March 26, 2006

Guest appearances
- Randy Crenshaw as Barbershop Quartet Member; Gavin Dunne as Christoper Moltisanti; Bob Joyce as Barbershop Quartet Member; John Joyce as Barbershop Quartet Member; Phil LaMarr as Morgan Freeman; Rick Logan as Barbershop Quartet Member; Wallace Shawn as Bertram; Tara Strong as Boy/Stewie's Girlfriend; Nicole Sullivan as Nurse at Sperm Bank; Wally Wingert as B.C. #2; Chris Wedge as Scrat (uncredited)

Episode chronology
← Previous "I Take Thee Quagmire"	Next → "Deep Throats"
- Family Guy season 4

"Sibling Rivalry" is the 22nd episode of the fourth season of the animated comedy series Family Guy. It originally aired on Fox in the United States on March 26, 2006. The episode follows Stewie as he battles with his half-brother, Bertram (voiced by Wallace Shawn), who is born to two lesbians after Peter donates sperm. Meanwhile, Lois begins excessive eating after Peter undergoes a vasectomy and does not feel well enough to have sex.

The episode was written by Cherry Chevapravatdumrong and directed by Dan Povenmire. The episode received mixed reviews from critics for its storyline and many cultural references. According to Nielsen ratings, it was viewed in 7.95 million homes in its original airing. The episode featured guest performances by Randy Crenshaw, Gavin Dunne, Bob Joyce, John Joyce, Phil LaMarr, Rick Logan, Wallace Shawn, Tara Strong, Nicole Sullivan and Wally Wingert, as well as several recurring voice actors for the series.

== Plot ==
After Lois has a pregnancy scare, Peter reluctantly agrees to get a vasectomy. Concerned they might eventually want another child, he decides to freeze some of his sperm before the surgery. At the sperm bank, he accidentally destroys all the existing samples, and replaces them with his own. A lesbian couple use one of the samples to conceive a child, giving birth to Bertram, who first appeared in the episode "Emission Impossible".

Bertram declares war on Stewie for control over the playground. They confront each other with F-117 Nighthawks and AH-1 Cobras, firing numerous bullets. After the air battle ends with no winner, Bertram resorts to biological warfare, using Stewie's new-found girlfriend to infect Stewie with chickenpox. After recovering, an enraged Stewie confronts Bertram, and they engage in a sword fight in the play area. Stewie eventually wins by disarming Bertram, and later that night, is seen suspiciously digging a hole with Christopher Moltisanti, but the hole is actually for a young tree. When Christopher questions Stewie on what happened to Bertram, Stewie claims that Bertram admitted defeat and ran away, with Christopher calling Bertram a mook.

Meanwhile, Peter loses his sex drive after the vasectomy, much to the frustration of Lois, who turns to food. After Peter makes fun of her slight weight gain, she deliberately gains more weight out of spite. Her increased appetite results in her becoming obese, which ironically ends up reviving their sex life. Peter feeds Lois copious amounts of food to make her even fatter. Eventually, Lois's heart gives out during sex and she is rushed to the hospital, where the doctors remove all of the excess fat and return her to normal size. Lois admits that eating is not a good way to solve problems, and Peter states he loves her no matter her size, but is later caught kissing the fat in a storage closet.

== Production ==
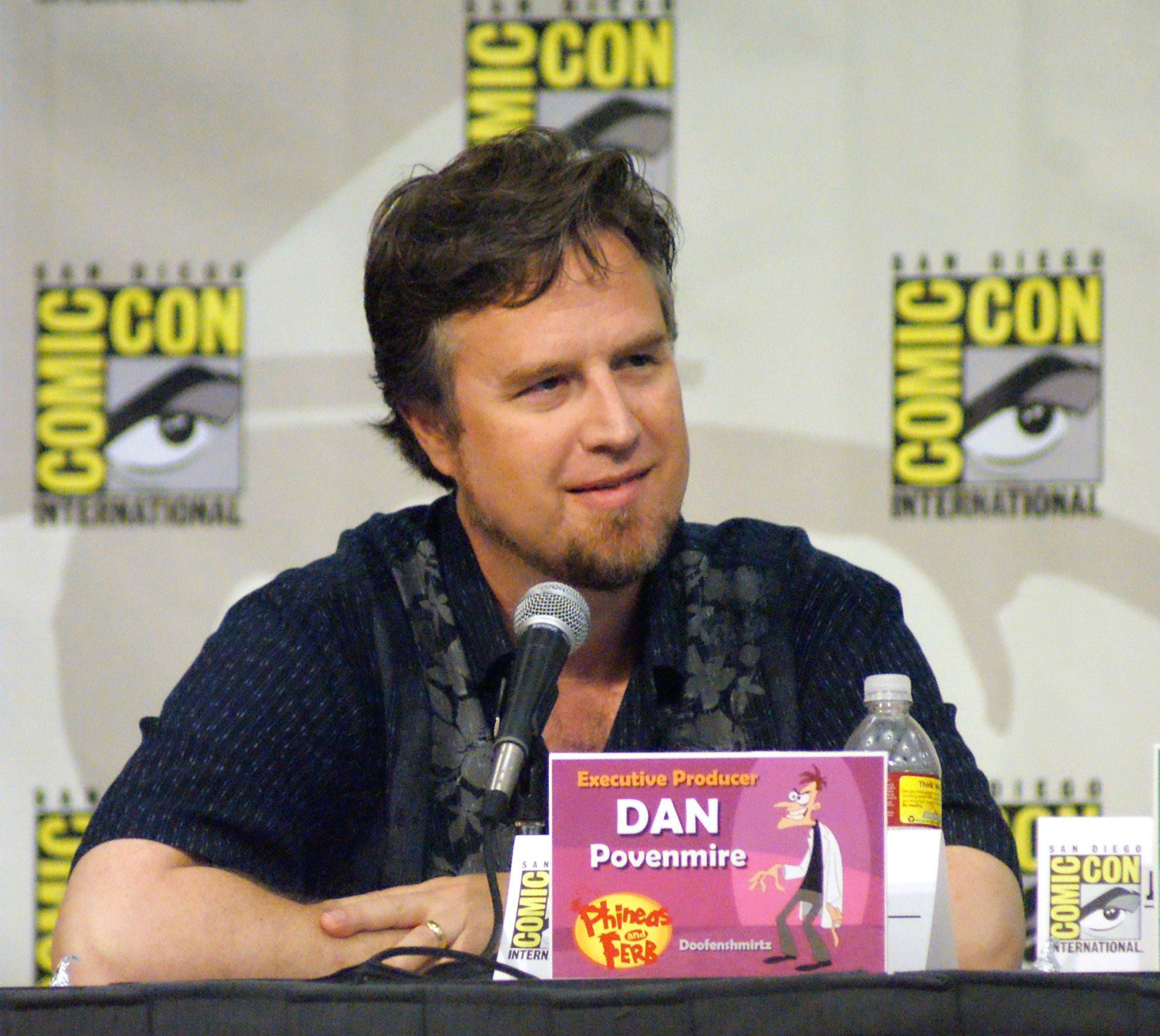
Dan Povenmire directed the episode.

The song performed after Lois' pregnancy test comes back negative was written by Alec Sulkin and Alex Borstein, and sung by professional Hollywood studio singers. Orchestrations in this song were performed by Walter Murphy, and described by show producer Seth MacFarlane to be "wonderful". The sketch of Peter challenging Lois to a race to Boston was removed from television broadcasting in order to save time. As Lois is slowly racing Peter to Boston, a Shania Twain song can be heard on the radio; Dan Povenmire states on the DVD commentary that he often gets into trouble for adding pieces of music into an episode when they're so short, yet cost so much. The producers of both Family Guy and the Ice Age series agreed to collaborate in the episode during its reference to Scrat from the Ice Age series.

There was discussion among the producers of the series regarding whether Bertram should be included in the storyline, as he had not appeared in any episodes for several years. An un-used scene was intended for broadcasting which showed Stewie, while trying to find Waldo in an Abercrombie & Fitch catalog, saying to Brian "Oh, turn to the next page. I bet they put him in someone's utility pocket", but it was never used as it was not deemed funny enough for the episode. Originally, Peter singing "Milkshake" to inmates at a prison was going to be naked and push his nipples from underneath, but broadcasting standards objected; as a result, the show broadcast Peter wearing underpants and pushing his nipples from the side. When Peter and Lois are in the restaurant and Peter leaves to "warn the chef of Lois' arrival", Lois was intended to say "If he won't put something in me, I will", but the gag was never broadcast.

The unsafe homeless man with whom Peter was seen leaving a youth-baseball team in Stewie's flashback was originally based on John Wayne Gacy, but people claimed he didn't look scary enough, so Povenmire changed the character completely to that of a homeless man. The idea of Stewie and Bertram laughing as they go down the slide during their sword fight was pitched by Povenmire's wife and, although negative about the idea at first, Povenmire included it in the episode because the original sketch was not going so well. During Peter and Lois' "fat sex", Peter repeatedly states "almost, almost"; originally, there was going to be approximately twice as many of these, but they were never included in the episode. The DVD version of the episode shows Peter arriving at the sperm bank and saying to the receptionist: "I have an appointment to banish a White Russian from my Kremlin", to which she replies with "This is a sperm bank, you don't have to use innuendo", and Peter concludes the conversation with "Where do I splooge?".

In addition to the regular cast, actors Randy Crenshaw, Gavin Dunne, Bob Joyce, John Joyce, Rick Logan, and Wallace Shawn, and voice actors Phil LaMarr, Tara Strong, Nicole Sullivan, and Wally Wingert guest starred in the episode. Recurring voice actor Ralph Garman, and writers Mike Henry, Chris Sheridan, Danny Smith, Alec Sulkin, and John Viener made minor appearances. Actor Patrick Warburton appeared in the episode as well.

== Cultural references ==
When in the children's park, Stewie quotes "Did ya get me my Cheez Whiz, boy" and a man throws one to him, this is a reference to The Blues Brothers. Stewie and Brian attempting to find diversity in an Abercrombie & Fitch catalogue is a reference to the children's book series Where's Wally?, as well as to a lawsuit alleging a lack of diversity in Abercrombie & Fitch's hiring practices. Before the battle between Stewie and Bertram, Stewie says "On my signal, unleash hell." This is a reference to the opening scene of Gladiator. An Ice Age reference (5 days before the release of Ice Age: The Meltdown) is made when Scrat, a character from the films, attempts to steal Peter's nuts. When Stewie invades Bertram's camp at the end of the episode Bertram quotes Star Wars Episode IV: A New Hope, repeating the line Darth Vader says when he senses Obi-Wan Kenobi on the Death Star. When Peter names his kids, Peter mentions the kids from various shows that are currently airing at Nick at Nite. When Brian mentions this, Peter begins naming Street Fighter characters. Brian again points out this fact, after which Peter names various colors. Sauron, the villain from The Lord of the Rings is shown as the Eye of Sauron in a scene where he is trying to find his lost contact lens. A cutaway scene features Peter in a jail surrounded by inmates who force him to strip, squeeze his boobs together, and sing the chorus from Kelis's 2003 hit “Milkshake.” This is possibly an homage to the scene after the credits in the movie Dodgeball: A True Underdog Story in which Ben Stiller does the same thing in his fatsuit.

After Bertram's defeat, the scene cuts away to Stewie and Christopher Moltisanti from The Sopranos digging a hole. The viewer is led to assume that the hole is for Bertram but really it is for a tree Stewie and Christopher are planting. Then Stewie states that Bertram admitted to defeat and ran off after which Christopher calls Bertram a "mook."

== Reception ==
"Sibling Rivalry" was watched by 7.95 million viewers, making it the 77th most-watched program of the week. In a review of the episode, Bob Sassone of TV Squad noted "If there's one reason I'm glad I watched tonight's episode it's because I learned exactly how a vasectomy is done," adding that "Peter is going to have a vasectomy, so he decides to freeze his sperm before he does it. This leads to a hysterical, yet truly gross, scene where Peter knocks over an entire shelf of sperm samples, and has to refill them, um, himself." Geoffrey D. Roberts of Real Talk Reviews reviewed the episode negatively, writing "many viewers will probably be disappointed with an episode about sibling rivalry between Stewie and newfound half-brother Bertram. Both share the same goal – to rule the Universe. With Bertram nothing more than a whinier version of his half-brother, it turns out one Stewie Griffin is more than enough."
