= Petergeist =

- Family Guy episode
- Episode no.: Season 4 Episode 26
- Directed by: Sarah Frost
- Written by: Alec Sulkin; Wellesley Wild
- Production code: 4ACX29
- Original air date: May 7, 2006

Guest appearances
- Phil LaMarr; Lori Alan as Diane Simmons; Adam West as Mayor Adam West; Carrot Top as himself; Bob Costas as himself

Episode chronology
← Previous "You May Now Kiss the... Uh... Guy Who Receives"	Next → "The Griffin Family History"
- Family Guy season 4

"Petergeist" is the 26th episode of the fourth season of the American animated series Family Guy, and the 76th episode overall. It originally aired on Fox on May 7, 2006. In this episode, Peter decides to build a multiplex to top Joe's new home theater, but comes across a Native American skull in his backyard and desecrates it. As a result, a poltergeist haunts the Griffins' house and spirits drag Stewie away to the other side, followed by even stranger events.

The episode was written by Alec Sulkin and Wellesley Wild and it was directed by Sarah Frost. This episode features guest appearances from Phil LaMarr, Lori Alan, Adam West, Carrot Top, and Bob Costas as well as several recurring voice actors for the series.

The episode's title and plot are derived from the 1982 film Poltergeist. The episode received mixed reviews.

== Plot ==
After Joe builds a home theater system, Peter decides to build a multiplex in his backyard out of spite. While digging, Peter finds the skull of a Native American buried in the backyard. Peter names it Chief Diamond Phillips. Brian frequently urges him to return the skull to its resting place, but Peter treats it as a novelty (playing with it, urinating in it, wearing it as an athletic cup, etc.).

That night the Griffins start experiencing strange paranormal activity: Stewie talks to the TV static, the chairs and refrigerator stack themselves upside down on the kitchen table, Peter rips at the flesh on his face until he uncovers Hank Hill's face, and Chris gets scared by the McDonald's clown, Ronald McDonald and he then gets attacked by an evil tree before being saved by Herbert. Lois is in denial of the events until Stewie gets sucked into his closet and disappears.

To find Stewie, the Griffins hire a spiritual medium (Bruce the Performance Artist in one of his many jobs) to contact the other side, and learn that the entrance to the spirit world is Stewie's closet, while the exit is "Meg's ass". Unable to wait for Stewie to come out of the closet (he is obviously reluctant to exit from Meg's rear end), Lois enters the portal and rescues Stewie. The enraged spirits emerge and ravage the Griffin house, sucking it into their world. As the Griffins drive off, Peter dumps the Native American skull in a garbage can.

Now homeless, Peter and Lois try to find a way to get their house back, and learn the Native American skull has to be put back in its resting place. After searching through the city dump, a garbage man tells them that the skull would be in the human remains bin, but it was cleaned out by Carrot Top for things to use as props. They go to Carrot Top's mansion and, after a chase through a hall of mirrors, they retrieve the skull and rebury it, thereby getting back their house and returning to normal life. At the end, Lois takes the TV and moves it outside the front door but Peter comes out, retrieves it and puts Meg outside instead.

== Production ==
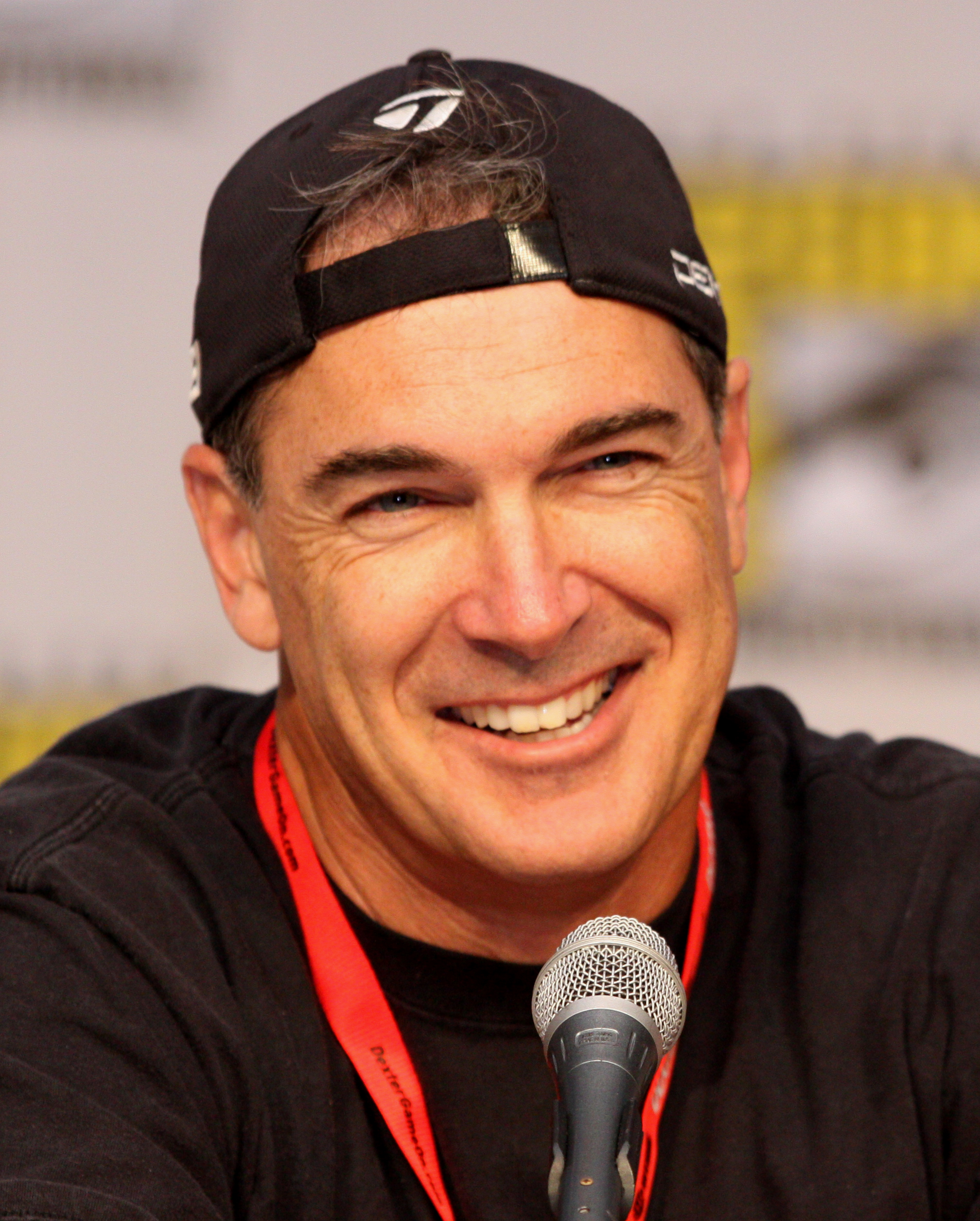
Patrick Warburton provides the voice of Joe in the episode.

"Petergeist" is the 26th episode of the fourth season of Family Guy. The episode was written by veteran writers and recurring voices for the show Alec Sulkin and Wellesley Wild. This is the third episode written by Sulkin and Wild to air, the first two being "Petarded" and "PTV" respectively. It was directed by Sarah Frost who is also a veteran of the show. Directors Peter Shin and Pete Michels acted as supervising directors, helping Frost direct this episode. Kirker Butler worked as the executive story editor, while Patrick Meighan, John Viener and Cherry Chevapravatdumrong worked as story editors. Mark Hentemann and Tom Devanney acted as consulting producers. Show creator Seth MacFarlane, David A. Goodman and Chris Shreidan worked as executive producers, Danny Smith was the co-executive producer of the episode and Steve Callaghan, Alec Sulkin, Wellesley Wild, Alex Borstein and Mike Henry all acted as producers of the episode.

Like many episodes of the series, it used an orchestra organized by MacFarlane; the orchestra used in "Petergeist" had 55 members, which was large for the series. Composer Ron Jones "spent months" studying and recreating the original music sheets from the 1982 horror film Poltergeist composed by Jerry Goldsmith. The photocopies of the music sheets cost Jones US$400.

"Petergeist," along with 13 other episodes from Season 4, were released on a three-disc DVD set in the United States on November 14, 2006. Special features include commentary on every episode, multi-angle scene studies, deleted scenes, 3 featurettes, unrated audio, and a DVD-ROM link to exclusive content.

In addition to the regular cast, sports commentator Bob Costas and comedian Carrot Top guest starred in the episode. Recurring voice actors Lori Alan, voice actor Phil LaMarr, writer Danny Smith writer Alec Sulkin, actress Jennifer Tilly, and writer John Viener made minor appearances. Recurring guest voice actors Adam West and Patrick Warburton also made guest appearances as well.

The DVD version includes some scenes that were edited from TV:

- When the Griffins leave the house (with Peter tossing the skull in the trash), Herbert the pedophile and the tree demon he fought earlier in the episode climb out of the hole and apologize for fighting. FOX objected to the scene because of the implication of anal sex when Herbert asks the tree demon if he's a "giving tree or a receiving tree."
- When Lois tells Stewie to come out of the spirit world by going through Meg's ass, Stewie shouts in an incredulous tone, "Have you lost your mind?!" in the TV version. On DVD, there's an alternate scene where Stewie adds that getting out of the spirit world through Meg's ass was just as likely as anyone remembering the 1980 cast of Saturday Night Live, followed by a mock-up of the season six opening featuring cast members Denny Dillon, Gail Matthius, Ann Risley, Yvonne Hudson, and Patrick Weathers, musical guest Jack Bruce and Friends, and host Scott Colomby. (The scene contained inaccuracies- Colomby has never hosted SNL, and Hudson and Weathers were featured players, thus their names weren't subtitled.)

== Cultural references ==
This episode may contain the highest amount of cultural references in a single airing, many of which are in rapid succession in the first half. In the beginning of the episode, when they are in Joe's home theater, Joe appears rolling across the ground in a parody of the 1984-1993 TriStar Pictures logo. The television show that Peter and Lois watch entitled Fast Talking High Trousers, which parodied 1940s films, was conceived by Wellesley Wild. The episode's title and plot references the horror film Poltergeist. The episode references the finale of the NBC sitcom Friends and its sequel Joey, also referencing the cancellation of Joey. To cheer himself up, Stewie at one point imagines himself on the show Jackass. In one scene, Chris is frightened by Ronald McDonald, and is saved from an evil tree by Herbert, who fights the tree in a The Lord of the Rings-style battle. When Peter is clawing at his face, he transforms into Hank Hill from King of the Hill. While trapped inside the spirit world, Stewie learns he can communicate through the TV, and he sings the second verse of the Phil Collins song "In the Air Tonight" with the same fuzzy reverb vocal effect used in the recorded song. While shooting golf balls through the portal, Peter remarks "we are going to get those terrorists, now watch this drive." A reference to a televised interview on a golf course in which President George W. Bush said the same thing before hitting a ball. Peter also references Bugs Bunny by sticking his head out of Meg's butt and claiming he took a wrong turn at Albuquerque. The scene of Peter taking the TV back in and putting Meg out referenced the end of the original film Poltergeist, where the family's father removes the television set after the family flees to a motel room. JAG is also shown, commenting how the show has run its course, the last episode of the series having aired on April 29, 2005. When the Griffin family approaches Carrot Top's mansion, the theme from Back to the Future is used. A cutaway gag refers the Dick Cheney hunting accident, which Cheney shooting down Peter multiple times, afterwards claiming he thought he was a deer. While feeding the skull, Peter says, "Want some more Peas Chief Diamond Phillips", a reference to Actor Lou Diamond Phillips who is part Cherokee Indian. Towards the end of the episode, Stewie mentions that he met Jesus and he was Chinese with the last name Hong. This could possibly be a reference to the Taiping Rebellion, which was led by a man who believed himself to be the brother of Jesus with the name Hong.

== Reception ==
The episode was watched by 8.4 million people, making it the 42nd most watched show of the week, tied with The Simpsons.

The episode received mixed reviews. Bob Sassone from TV Squad praised the episode's humor, saying that he loved the Poltergeist takeoffs in the episode, even the music and special effects, especially when Peter plays around with the portals that are in Meg's butt. IGN staff writer Michael Drucker gave a more critical review, saying that the jokes "quickly get old once you realize the episode blows its load fifteen minutes into the show".
