= American English vocabulary =

Lexicon

The United States has given the English lexicon thousands of words, meanings, and phrases. Several thousand are now used in English as spoken internationally. Some words are only used within North American English and American English.

== Creation of an American lexicon ==
The process of coining new lexical items started as soon as the colonists began borrowing names for unfamiliar flora, fauna, and topography from the Native American languages. Examples of such names are opossum, raccoon, squash and moose (from Algonquian). Other Native American loanwords, such as wigwam or moccasin, describe articles in common use among Native Americans. The languages of the other colonizing nations also added to the American vocabulary; for instance, cookie, cruller, stoop, and pit (of a fruit) from Dutch; angst, kindergarten, sauerkraut from German, levee, portage ("carrying of boats or goods") and (probably) gopher from French; barbecue (originally from Taíno), stevedore, and rodeo from Spanish.

Among the earliest and most notable regular "English" additions to the American vocabulary, dating from the early days of colonization through the early 19th century, are terms describing the features of the North American landscape; for instance, run, branch, fork, snag, bluff, gulch, neck (of the woods), barrens, bottomland, notch, knob, riffle, rapids, watergap, cutoff, trail, timberline and divide. Already existing words such as creek, slough, sleet and (in later use) watershed received new meanings that were unknown in England.

Other noteworthy American toponyms are found among loanwords; for example, prairie, butte (French); bayou (Choctaw via Louisiana French); coulee (Canadian French, but used also in Louisiana with a different meaning); canyon, mesa, arroyo (Spanish); vlei, skate, kill (Dutch, Hudson Valley).

The word corn, used in England to refer to wheat (or any cereal), came to denote the plant Zea mays, the most important crop in the U.S., originally named Indian corn by the earliest settlers; wheat, rye, barley, oats, etc. came to be collectively referred to as grain. Other notable farm related vocabulary additions were the new meanings assumed by barn (not only a building for hay and grain storage, but also for housing livestock) and team (not just the horses, but also the vehicle along with them), as well as, in various periods, the terms range, (corn) crib, truck, elevator, sharecropping and feedlot.

Ranch, later applied to a house style, derives from Mexican Spanish; most Spanish contributions came after the War of 1812, with the opening of the West. Among these are, other than toponyms, chaps (from chaparreras), plaza, lasso, bronco, buckaroo, rodeo; examples of "English" additions from the cowboy era are bad man, maverick, chuck ("food") and Boot Hill; from the California Gold Rush came such idioms as hit pay dirt or strike it rich. The word blizzard probably originated in the West. A couple of notable late 18th century additions are the verb belittle and the noun bid, both first used in writing by Thomas Jefferson.

With the new continent developed new forms of dwelling, and hence a large inventory of words designating real estate concepts (land office, lot, outlands, waterfront, the verbs locate and relocate, betterment, addition, subdivision), types of property (log cabin, adobe in the 18th century; frame house, apartment, tenement house, shack, shanty in the 19th century; project, condominium, townhouse, split-level, mobile home, multi-family in the 20th century), and parts thereof (driveway, breezeway, backyard, dooryard; clapboard, siding, trim, baseboard; stoop (from Dutch), family room, den; and, in recent years, HVAC, central air, walkout basement).

Ever since the American Revolution, a great number of terms connected with the U.S. political institutions have entered the language; examples are run (i.e, for office), gubernatorial, primary election, carpetbagger (after the Civil War), repeater, lame duck (a British term used originally in Banking) and pork barrel. Some of these are internationally used (for example, caucus, gerrymander, filibuster, exit poll).

=== 19th century onwards ===
The development of material innovations during the Industrial Revolution throughout the 19th and 20th centuries was the source of a massive stock of distinctive new concepts, with their accompanying new words, phrases and idioms. Typical examples are the vocabulary of railroading (see further at rail terminology) and transportation terminology, ranging from names of roads (from dirt roads and back roads to freeways and parkways) to road infrastructure (parking lot, overpass, rest area), and from automotive terminology to public transit (for example, in the sentence "riding the subway downtown"); such American introductions as commuter (from commutation ticket), concourse, to board (a vehicle), to park, double-park and parallel park (a car), double decker or the noun terminal have long been used in all dialects of English.

Trades of various kinds have endowed (American) English with household words describing jobs and occupations (bartender, longshoreman, patrolman, hobo, bouncer, bellhop, roustabout, white collar, blue collar, employee, boss [from Dutch], intern, busboy, mortician, senior citizen), businesses and workplaces (department store, supermarket, thrift store, gift shop, drugstore, motel, main street, gas station, hardware store, savings and loan, hock [also from Dutch]), as well as general concepts and innovations (automated teller machine, smart card, cash register, dishwasher, reservation [as at hotels], pay envelope, movie, mileage, shortage, outage, blood bank).

Already existing English words—such as store, shop, dry goods, haberdashery, lumber—underwent shifts in meaning; some—such as mason, student, clerk, the verbs can (as in "canned goods"), ship, fix, carry, enroll (as in school), run (as in "run a business"), release and haul—were given new significations, while others (such as tradesman) have retained meanings that disappeared in England. From the world of business and finance came break-even, merger, delisting, downsize, disintermediation, bottom line; from sports terminology came, jargon aside, Monday-morning quarterback, cheap shot, game plan (football); in the ballpark, out of left field, off base, hit and run, and many other idioms from baseball; gamblers coined bluff, blue chip, ante, bottom dollar, raw deal, pass the buck, ace in the hole, freeze-out, showdown; miners coined bedrock, bonanza, peter out, pan out and the verb prospect from the noun; and railroadmen are to be credited with make the grade, sidetrack, head-on, and the verb railroad. A number of Americanisms describing material innovations remained largely confined to North America: elevator, ground, gasoline; many automotive terms fall in this category, although many do not (hatchback, sport utility vehicle, station wagon, tailgate, motorhome, truck, pickup truck, to exhaust).

In addition to the above-mentioned loans from French, Spanish, Mexican Spanish, Dutch, and Native American languages, other accretions from foreign languages came with 19th and early 20th century immigration; notably, from Yiddish (chutzpah, schmooze, tush) and German—hamburger and culinary terms like frankfurter/franks, liverwurst, sauerkraut, wiener, deli(catessen); scram, kindergarten, gesundheit; musical terminology (whole note, half note, etc.); and apparently cookbook, fresh ("impudent") and what gives? Such constructions as Are you coming with? and I like to dance (for "I like dancing") may also be the result of German or Yiddish influence.

Finally, a large number of English colloquialisms from various periods are American in origin; some have lost their American flavor (from OK and cool to nerd and 24/7), while others have not (have a nice day, for sure); many are now distinctly old-fashioned (swell, groovy). Some English words now in general use, such as hijacking, disc jockey, boost, bulldoze and jazz, originated as American slang. Among the many English idioms of U.S. origin are get the hang of, bark up the wrong tree, keep tabs, run scared, take a backseat, have an edge over, stake a claim, take a shine to, in on the ground floor, bite off more than one can chew, off/on the wagon, stay put, inside track, stiff upper lip, bad hair day, throw a monkey wrench/monkeywrenching, under the weather, jump bail, come clean, come again?, it ain't over till it's over, and what goes around comes around.

== Morphology ==
American English has always shown a marked tendency to use nouns as verbs. Examples of verbed nouns are interview, advocate, vacuum, lobby, pressure, rear-end, transition, feature, profile, spearhead, skyrocket, showcase, service (as a car), corner, torch, exit (as in "exit the lobby"), factor (in mathematics), gun ("shoot"), author (which disappeared in English around 1630 and was revived in the U.S. three centuries later) and, out of American material, proposition, graft (bribery), bad-mouth, vacation, major, backpack, backtrack, intern, ticket (traffic violations), hassle, blacktop, peer-review, dope and OD, and, of course verbed as used at the start of this sentence.

Compounds coined in the U.S. are for instance foothill, flatlands, badlands, landslide (in all senses), overview (the noun), backdrop, teenager, brainstorm, bandwagon, hitchhike, smalltime, deadbeat, frontman, lowbrow and highbrow, hell-bent, foolproof, nitpick, about-face (later verbed), upfront (in all senses), fixer-upper, no-show; many of these are phrases used as adverbs or (often) hyphenated attributive adjectives: non-profit, for-profit, free-for-all, ready-to-wear, catchall, low-down, down-and-out, down and dirty, in-your-face, nip and tuck; many compound nouns and adjectives are open: happy hour, fall guy, capital gain, road trip, wheat pit, head start, plea bargain; some of these are colorful (empty nester, loan shark, ambulance chaser, buzz saw, ghetto blaster, dust bunny), others are euphemistic (differently abled (physically challenged), human resources, affirmative action, correctional facility).

Many compound nouns have the form verb plus preposition: add-on, stopover, lineup, shakedown, tryout, spin-off, rundown ("summary"), shootout, holdup, hideout, comeback, cookout, kickback, makeover, takeover, rollback ("decrease"), rip-off, come-on, shoo-in, fix-up, tie-in, tie-up ("stoppage"), stand-in. These essentially are nouned phrasal verbs; some prepositional and phrasal verbs are in fact of American origin (spell out, figure out, hold up, brace up, size up, rope in, back up/off/down/out, step down, miss out, kick around, cash in, rain out, check in and check out (in all senses), fill in ("inform"), kick in or throw in ("contribute"), square off, sock in, sock away, factor in/out, come down with, give up on, lay off (from employment), run into and across ("meet"), stop by, pass up, put up (money), set up ("frame"), trade in, pick up on, pick up after, lose out).

Noun endings such as -ee (retiree), -ery (bakery), -ster (gangster) and -cian (beautician) are also particularly productive. Some verbs ending in -ize are of U.S. origin; for example, fetishize, prioritize, burglarize, accessorize, itemize, editorialize, customize, notarize, weatherize, winterize, Mirandize; and so are some back-formations (locate, fine-tune, evolute, curate, donate, emote, upholster, peeve and enthuse). Among syntactical constructions that arose in the U.S. are as of (with dates and times), outside of, headed for, meet up with, back of, convince someone to, not about to and lack for.

Americanisms formed by alteration of some existing words include notably pesky, phony, rambunctious, pry (as in "pry open", from prize), putter (verb), buddy, sundae, skeeter, sashay and kitty-corner. Adjectives that arose in the U.S. are for example, lengthy, bossy, cute and cutesy, grounded (of a child), punk (in all senses), sticky (of the weather), through (as in "through train", or meaning "finished"), and many colloquial forms such as peppy or wacky. American blends include motel, guesstimate, infomercial and televangelist.

== English words that survived in the United States and not in the United Kingdom ==
A number of words and meanings that originated in Middle English or Early Modern English and that have been in everyday use in the United States dropped out in most varieties of British English; some of these have cognates in Lowland Scots. Terms such as fall ("autumn"), faucet ("tap"), diaper ("nappy"), candy ("sweets"), skillet, eyeglasses and obligate are often regarded as Americanisms. Fall for example came to denote the season in 16th century England, a contraction of Middle English expressions like "fall of the leaf" and "fall of the year".

During the 17th century, English immigration to the British colonies in North America was at its peak and the new settlers took the English language with them. While the term fall gradually became obsolete in Britain, it became the more common term in North America. Gotten (past participle of get) is often considered to be an Americanism, although there are some areas of Britain, such as Lancashire and North East England, that still continue to use it and sometimes also use putten as the past participle for put (which is not done by most speakers of American English).

Other words and meanings, to various extents, were brought back to Britain, especially in the second half of the 20th century; these include hire ("to employ"), quit ("to stop", which spawned quitter in the U.S.), I guess (famously criticized by H. W. Fowler), baggage, hit (a place), and the adverbs overly and presently ("currently"). Some of these, for example monkey wrench and wastebasket, originated in 19th century Britain.

The mandative subjunctive (as in "the City Attorney suggested that the case not be closed") is livelier in American English than it is in British English. It appears in some areas as a spoken usage and is considered obligatory in contexts that are more formal. The adjectives mad meaning "angry", smart meaning "intelligent", and sick meaning "ill" are also more frequent in American (these meanings are also frequent in Hiberno-English) than British English.

== Regionally distinct vocabulary within the United States ==
Linguist Bert Vaux created a survey, completed in 2003, polling English speakers across the United States about the specific words they would use in everyday speech for various concepts. This 2003 study concluded that:

- For a "long sandwich that contains cold cuts, lettuce, and so on", the most common term found in the survey, throughout the country (preferred by 77% of the participants), was the word sub (an abbreviation for submarine sandwich). The New York metropolitan area shows the greatest variety of terms for this idea in one single region, largely counting for the 5% of the survey who preferred the term hero, nearly 7% (which is even more prevalent in the Pittsburgh and Philadelphia metropolitan areas, including southern New Jersey as well as eastern Pennsylvania) who preferred hoagie, and just less than 3% (also notably prevalent throughout New England, except Maine) who prefer grinder.
- The U.S. is largely divided about the "generic term for a sweetened carbonated beverage". Nearly 53% of the surveyed sample preferred soda, particularly in the Northeast, eastern Wisconsin, Greater St. Louis, the far West, and some of South Florida, with it also called tonic in some parts of southeastern New England. Over 25% preferred pop, particularly around the Midwest (including the Great Lakes region) and the Western regions along the Canada–United States border. Over 12% preferred coke (which is also trademarked for a specific cola product), particularly scattered throughout the South. Urban, coastal California speakers use all three terms, though especially soda. Speakers of the West generally use soda or pop.
- The most common word or phrase "to address a group of two or more people" (in the second person) was you guys at almost 43%, particularly throughout the Northeast and Great Lakes region (along with simply you at nearly 13%). Y'all was preferred by 14%, particularly in the South, but reaching somewhat noticeably into the Northern regions as well. Yous(e) was largely confined to the New York and Philadelphia metropolitan areas, at just over 0.5%. The expression "yinz" is a distinctive feature of Western Pennsylvania speech.
- The most common term for generic, rubber-soled shoes worn for athletic activities is sneakers as said by 46% of those surveyed throughout the country, but particularly in the Northeast. 41%, particularly outside the Northeast, said tennis shoes. Several much rarer other terms were also documented in various regions of the country.
- Nearly 68% of the participating speakers make no distinction between dinner and supper, or simply never use the term supper.
- 64% of the participants said they use "Where are you at?" to mean "How are you coming along?" This also incorporated the 34% who use "Where are you at?" in any context, for example, to even mean "Where are you physically located right now?"
- Freshwater "miniature lobsters" were identified by 40% of polled speakers as crawfish, 32% as crayfish, and 19% as crawdads within no particular regional boundaries, except that crayfish was especially uncommon in the South. 5% reported having no term for this animal.
- The most common nicknames for grandparents were grandpa/grampa and grandma/gramma.
- Nearly all American English speakers called the lampyrid insect a firefly or lightning bug, with nearly 40% using the two terms interchangeably.
- The use of the word anymore with a positive sense, simply as a synonym for nowadays (e.g. I do only figurative paintings anymore), was reported as sounding acceptable to 5% of participants. However, in example sentences with a clearly disheartened tone or dismissive attitude, the positive use of anymore sounded acceptable to as many as 29% of participants (e.g. Forget your baby wearing nice clothes anymore). This rare use of the word was observed much more around Pennsylvania and going westward into the Midland region.
- The "wheeled contraption" for carrying groceries was identified by 77% of participants as a shopping cart and by nearly 14% as a grocery cart. 4% preferred the term buggy: a clearly Southern phenomenon.
