= Frazier Moore =

American journalist (born 1951)

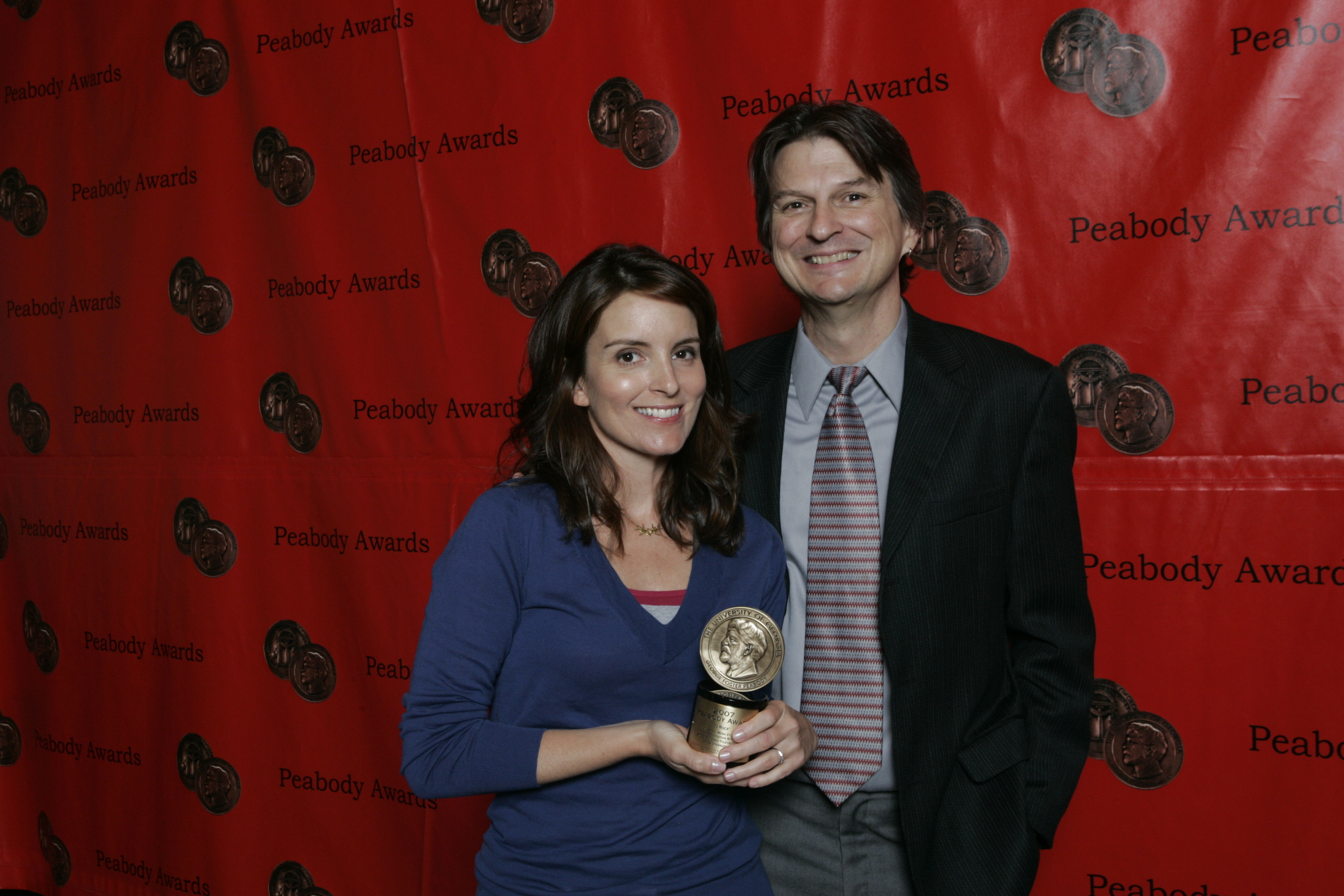
Frazier Moore, right (2008)

Hamilton Frazier Moore, Jr. (born April 4, 1951), known as Frazier Moore, is an American journalist. He was a television reporter/critic for The Associated Press until 2017. He is the author of Inside 'Family Guy': An Illustrated History, published in 2019.

== Biography ==
Moore, born in Athens, Georgia, attended the University of Georgia and graduated in 1974. He wrote for The Atlanta Journal-Constitution and The Fort Myers (Florida) News-Press. Other publications for which Moore has written include Spy, Connoisseur, The New York Times, Interview and TV Guide.

In 1992, Moore became television critic for The Associated Press, based in New York. In 1993, he was criticised for clandestinely gaining entry to a test show for Conan O’Brien’s then-upcoming late night debut and publishing an editorial criticising the quality of the show and the professionalism of the presenters.
