= Go, Stewie, Go! =

- Family Guy episode
- Episode no.: Season 8 Episode 13
- Directed by: Greg Colton
- Written by: Gary Janetti
- Production code: 7ACX15
- Original air date: March 14, 2010

Guest appearances
- Stephen Bishop as himself; Mo Collins as Little Girl; Colin Ford as Randall; Anne Hathaway as Mother Maggie; Lucas Grabeel as Anthony; Nana Visitor as Audition caller; Mae Whitman as Julie

Episode chronology
← Previous "Extra Large Medium"	Next → "Peter-assment"
- Family Guy season 8

"Go, Stewie, Go!" is the 13th episode of the eighth season of the animated comedy series Family Guy. It originally aired on Fox in the United States on March 14, 2010. The episode features Stewie after he auditions, cross-dressed under the pseudonym Karina Smirnoff, for a female role in the American version of Jolly Farm Revue, and eventually ends up falling in love with a female co-star on the show. Meanwhile, Lois finds herself attracted to Meg's surprisingly normal boyfriend, after she is asked by Peter to realize her advancing age.

The episode was written by Gary Janetti and directed by Greg Colton. It received mixed reviews from critics for its storyline and many cultural references, in addition to receiving criticism from the Parents Television Council. According to Nielsen ratings, it was viewed in 6.72 million homes in its original airing. The episode featured guest performances by Stephen Bishop, Mo Collins, Colin Ford, Lucas Grabeel, Anne Hathaway, Nana Visitor and Mae Whitman, along with several recurring guest voice actors for the series. "Go, Stewie, Go!" was released on DVD along with ten other episodes from the season on December 13, 2011.

== Plot ==
Brian, walking in drunk, notices that Stewie has resumed watching Jolly Farm Revue, after previously swearing off the show in "Road to Europe". Remembering a story he had seen in the local newspaper, Brian tells Stewie about upcoming auditions for an American version of the show. Jumping at the opportunity, the two show up to the auditions, but quickly learn that there is only one female role remaining. Determined to win a spot on the show, Stewie decides to cross-dress as a woman, naming his new identity "Karina Smirnoff". Beginning his audition, he starts by telling a completely fabricated story. Convincing the producers that he is telling a true tale, he wins the role. The next morning, on the first day of filming, Stewie as Karina introduces himself to the rest of the cast, and quickly falls in love with a female co-star named Julie. Another co-star, Randall, objects to the new role that Karina was cast to play, and takes Julie away from him to prevent their friendship. As they continue shooting, however, the two develop a friendly relationship, eventually deciding to hold a sleepover, where they become even closer. The next day, Julie professes her love for Karina by wishing that she was actually a boy, causing Stewie, as Karina, to come on to her. Julie insists that she is not a lesbian, so Stewie decides to unveil his true identity to the entire cast during a live taping of the show. Shocked that Karina was actually a boy, Julie's mother refuses to let her speak to him, with Stewie left to regret his decision to come out as a cross-dresser, and decides to go get ice cream with Brian, as he can no longer wear that dress.

Meanwhile, Peter begins notifying Lois about her advancing age, including her minor strands of gray hair. This makes her extremely self-conscious, and soon Lois becomes aware of her lust for a younger man. After introducing her new boyfriend, Anthony, to the family, Meg goes on to make out with him on the family couch, with Lois watching over nearby. Jealous of her daughter's new-found love, she begins hitting on Anthony. Later that day, Lois sends Meg to pick up her grandfather, leaving her all alone with Anthony. The two then begin making out on the couch, but Meg returns to the house only a few moments later and discovers them. Angry at her mother for ruining her chance at having a normal boyfriend, Meg threatens Lois to lay off of him, pulling out one of her own teeth in frustration. Lois quickly agrees, but is still angry with Peter for continually insulting her. She confronts him about this, and he admits that he was actually embarrassed about his own advancing age, as well as his lack of fitness, and was only insulting Lois in order to distract her from the fact that she could be with a much better-looking man. He apologizes for his behavior, and Lois forgives him.

== Production and development ==
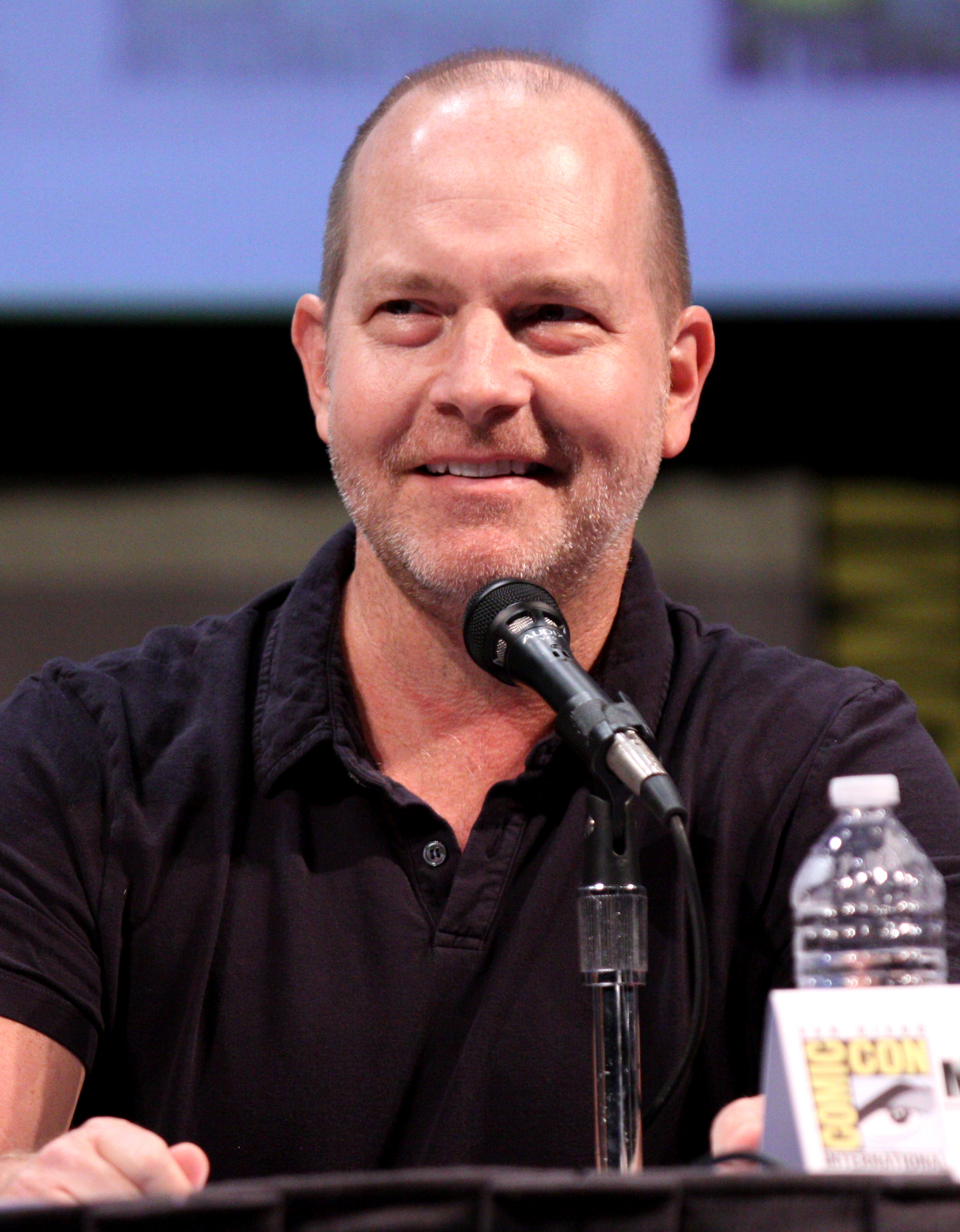
Mike Henry briefly appeared as Cleveland Brown in the episode.

The episode was written by returning writer Gary Janetti, his first episode since the fourth season episode "Stewie B. Goode". In addition, the episode was directed by series regular Greg Colton, before the conclusion of the seventh production season. The episode was Colton's second for the season, the first being the season premiere, "Road to the Multiverse", which received high praise from critics. The episode saw the third re-appearance, the first being an equally brief appearance in "Spies Reminiscent of Us" and the second in "Road to the Multiverse", by former main cast member Mike Henry as the voice of Cleveland Brown. The actor had previously left the role on Family Guy, in order to star as the character in his own spin-off, entitled The Cleveland Show.

"Go, Stewie, Go!", along with the eleven other episodes from Family Guy's eighth season, was released on a three-disc DVD set in the United States on December 13, 2011. The sets include brief audio commentaries by various crew and cast members for several episodes, a collection of deleted scenes and animatics, a special mini-feature which discussed the process behind animating "And Then There Were Fewer", a mini-feature entitled "The Comical Adventures of Family Guy – Brian & Stewie: The Lost Phone Call", and footage of the Family Guy panel at the 2010 San Diego Comic-Con.

In addition to the regular cast, musician Stephen Bishop rerecorded his single "It Might Be You", actress Mo Collins appeared as a little girl, voice actor Colin Ford appeared briefly as Randall, actress Anne Hathaway appeared as Mother Maggie, actor Lucas Grabeel appeared as Meg's new boyfriend Anthony, voice actress Nana Visitor appeared briefly as the audition caller and voice actress Mae Whitman appeared as Julie. Recurring guest voice actors Ralph Garman, writer Gary Janetti, writer Danny Smith, writer Alec Sulkin, actress Jennifer Tilly and writer John Viener also made minor appearances.

== Cultural references ==
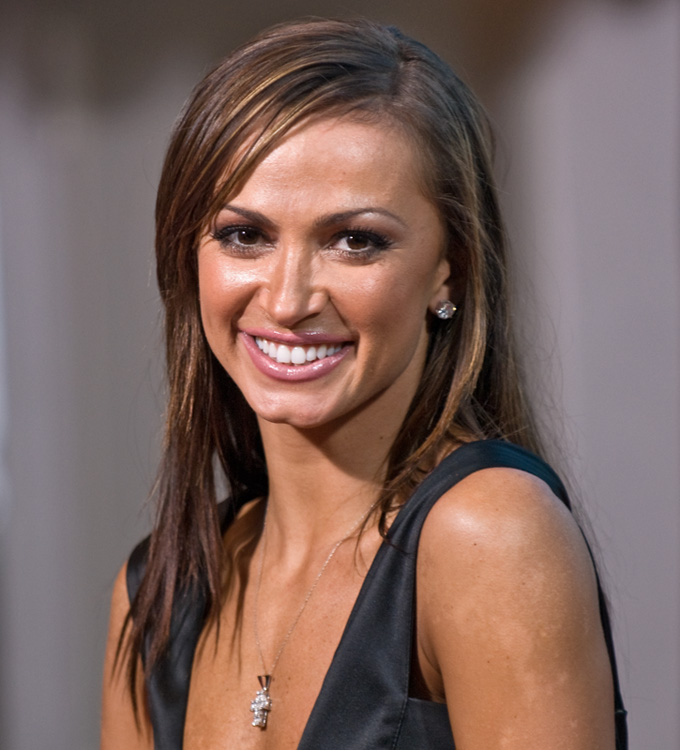
Dancer Karina Smirnoff's name was used by Stewie.

Although never specifically referenced or mentioned in the episode itself, Stewie's alter-ego is named after well-known ballroom dancer Karina Smirnoff, who had previously danced professionally on the American television reality show Dancing with the Stars. Most of the storyline following Stewie is a homage of the 1982 film Tootsie. The episode's title is also a reference to the song "Go, Tootsie, Go" played during the photo-shoot montage in the film. A similar scene featuring the song was slightly modified, replacing "Tootsie" with "Stewie," in the lyrics to the song. Another song from the film, "It Might Be You" by Stephen Bishop, is played during the closing credit sequence.

As Stewie and Brian watch a recorded episode of Jolly Farm Revue, Stewie notes the introduction of several new characters to the show. The television screen is then shown, as Karina reveals the characters to his co-star, Julie. The new characters include parodies of the Sesame Street characters Big Bird, who describes himself as a "large bird," and a self-described "grouch" named "Moody Green Garbage Creature", who resembles Oscar the Grouch, and butch and femme versions of Bert and Ernie, who try to protect Karina and Julie from Oscar.

After sending Meg out on an errand to pick up her grandfather, Lois continues to seduce Anthony, having been interested in him since Peter had begun insulting her about her advancing age. Quickly returning after forgetting the car keys, Meg discovers her mother making out with her new boyfriend on the couch. The bass jingle used extensively in the long-running NBC sitcom Seinfeld is then heard, with the scene pausing, before transitioning to the Jolly Farm studio. In a surprise visit to the Griffin family home, Julie unexpectedly appears when Stewie opens the front door. Expecting Julie to recognize him, he forgets that he is not dressed as Karina, causing him to hurriedly change clothing, while pretending to have an argument with his fabricated persona. A similar scene is featured in the 1993 film Mrs. Doubtfire, starring actor Robin Williams. Stewie and Jolly Farm make a reference to Pan Am Flight 103, a Boeing 747-100 destroyed by a terrorist bomb over Lockerbie, Scotland, killing all 259 occupants. Large portions of the plane fell onto Lockerbie, which killed 11 people, escalating the death toll to 270. A song features on Jolly Farm that explicitly describes debris from the newly disintegrated plane falling into Lockerbie, sung in the fashion of a nursery rhyme.

== Reception ==
In an improvement over the previous two episodes, the episode was viewed in 6.72 million homes in its original airing, according to Nielsen ratings. The episode also acquired a 3.5 rating in the 18–49 demographic, beating The Simpsons, as well as the series premiere of Sons of Tucson, in addition to significantly edging out both shows in total viewership.

Reviews of the episode were mixed, calling the storyline a "[good source of] material in the long-running dysfunctional yet affectionate relationship between Brian and Stewie," while criticizing its multiple cultural references. Emily VanDerWerff of The A.V. Club called the episode a "pleasant surprise," enjoying Stewie's storyline, while criticizing the subplot between Lois and Meg. Ramsey Isler of IGN was much more critical of the episode, however, saying that "while there [were] a couple of funny moments, there are more misses than hits," giving the episode a 6 out of 10. In a subsequent review of Family Guy's eighth season, Isler listed "Go, Stewie, Go!" as being "full of the lowest of the lowest-common-denominator "jokes", with heavy reliance on toilet humor and the characteristic cutaway gags that have steadily gotten more random and less funny." In contrast, Jason Hughes of TV Squad praised the episode, saying that it "[offered] an emotional glimpse into the characters."

Naming the episode as its "Worst TV Show of the Week" for "strong sexual content," the Parents Television Council called the episode a "nauseating new low," criticizing multiple scenes, including Lois making out with a minor, as well as the confrontation between Brian and Karina at the bar. The PTC also criticized Seth MacFarlane for attempting to "elicit disgust" throughout the episode by "[choosing] incest and rape" in order to "provoke [emotions]."

The episode was heavily criticized by families of the victims of Pan Am Flight 103 for the nursery rhyme, "It's raining babies and luggage and limbs and Daddy doesn't come home", which explicitly describes the debris from the disintegrating plane falling into Lockerbie.
