= Peterotica =

- Family Guy episode
- Episode no.: Season 4 Episode 24
- Directed by: Kurt Dumas
- Written by: Patrick Meighan
- Production code: 4ACX27
- Original air date: April 23, 2006

Guest appearances
- Betty White as herself; Tamera Mowry as book customer; Alex Breckenridge as Renée Zellweger

Episode chronology
← Previous "Deep Throats"	Next → "You May Now Kiss the... Uh... Guy Who Receives"
- Family Guy season 4

"Peterotica" is the 24th episode from season four of the animated comedy series Family Guy. The episode was originally broadcast on Fox on April 23, 2006, and was written by Patrick Meighan and directed by Kurt Dumas. The title of the episode is a portmanteau of "Peter" and "Erotica".

The plot follows Peter's brief career writing erotic novels. After Peter asks Carter Pewterschmidt for publishing money, Carter is sued by a man who has a car crash while listening to an audiobook of one of Peter's novels; the settlement forces Carter into bankruptcy. Peter attempts to help Carter accept life as a middle-class citizen, then decides to work with Carter so they can both become wealthy, but gives up after multiple failed attempts. Carter soon gets his fortune back when his wife returns to him, and he resumes hating Peter. Meanwhile, Stewie attempts to train for the Olympics, despite discouraging comments from Brian.

== Plot ==
Peter, Joe, and Cleveland accompany Quagmire to a sex shop called Pornoslavia. Peter buys an erotic book entitled Much Ado About Humping and finds it disappointing. Peter writes a letter to the author, including an example of what he would consider a better writing style for an erotic novel, which impresses his friends when he reads it to them. Encouraged by their enthusiasm, Peter decides to write his own erotic novel, which is received well by all who read it. The novels he authors are converted into audio books read by Betty White, and "published" by Peter's father-in-law, Carter Pewterschmidt, who only gave Peter $5 for photocopies. While listening to one of Peter's audio books, an aroused driver tries to take off his shirt while driving and crashes his car into the Kool-Aid Man's house. The man sues Carter, who is liable as the publisher. Carter immediately loses his fortune. Blaming Peter for his penniless state, Carter arrives at the Griffin house intending to shoot Peter. Lois persuades Carter to spare him, and Peter agrees to let Carter live with them until he has income.

Barbara divorces Carter and marries Ted Turner. Peter attempts to teach Carter how to live as a "regular person", but Carter does not acclimate well. Peter and Carter attempt to make money, robbing a train after several other failed attempts, but the robbery is unsuccessful also. Carter punches Peter into the Kool aid Guy's house after many repairs. As Peter and Carter begin to accept that they will never be rich, Barbara returns and informs Carter that they are rich again, because she has divorced Ted Turner and taken half his assets. Despite Peter's help, Carter abandons him. Lois informs Peter she refused $10 million that her parents offered her 10 years ago as she believed that the family did not need money; as she explains this, Peter fantasizes about killing her.

Meanwhile, Stewie trains in gymnastics to compete in the Olympics.

== Production ==
"Peterotica" was written by Patrick Meighan and directed by Kurt Dumas. The episode ran into multiple objections from broadcasting standards and the show's producers. For instance, the original title of the episode was "A Connecticut Yankee and King Arthur's Butt", but broadcasting standards objected. A sequence showing all of the different erotic novels written by Peter was edited for the television version; one entitled Catcher in the Eye was removed from the television version as broadcasting standards disliked the cover, which implied her eye was a target for semen during ejaculation. The scene of Peter reading his new erotic novel to Lois was never cut from airing, although the producers of Family Guy had some trouble with it, as it is the second semen joke of the episode. When Lois's father, Carter, sits down at the breakfast table, Lois states: "Daddy, did you remember to clean up?" Originally, she was meant to say, "Daddy, did you remember to wipe yourself?", but broadcasting standards objected, so it was modified to "Daddy, did you remember to clean yourself?" However, standards still objected, so it was changed to its current version.

Stewie is seen practicing for the Olympics and is disturbed by Chris; this scene was originally meant to be the start of a subplot in which Stewie would build a machine to make Chris intelligent. Although it would be successful, Chris would become more clever than Stewie. The subplot was scrapped because it was deemed not funny enough. The gag in which Peter is a landlord over a rat family in the Griffin family basement was removed from television broadcasting for timing purposes. The "thinking grenade" sketch, in which Peter uses live grenades to help him think, was originally intended to be used in "PTV" in a scene in The Drunken Clam, but there were no windows in the Clam nearby for Peter to throw the grenades through, so instead of adding windows to the building's design for that episode, the gag was moved to this episode. The "naughty flapper girl" gag was included in the original draft of the episode.

== Cultural references ==
The episode features multiple references to popular culture. The song Quagmire sings in the sex shop is a part of "Make 'Em Laugh" from the 1952 musical film Singin' in the Rain. The erotic book Peter buys at the sex shop is Much Ado About Humping, a parody of the William Shakespeare play Much Ado About Nothing. The four porn books shown on screen are references to works of literature: Angela's Asses to Angela's Ashes by Frank McCourt, Catcher in the Eye to Catcher in the Rye by J. D. Salinger, Shaved New World to Brave New World by Aldous Huxley, and Harry Potter and the Half Black Chick to Harry Potter and the Half-Blood Prince by J. K. Rowling.

After returning from the porn shop, Peter is shown watching an episode of Blind Justice. The lawyer who attempts to sue Carter is forced into a battle with a rancor in a scene that mirrors Luke Skywalker's fight with the Rancor in the 1983 film Return of the Jedi. When Peter and Carter are trying to make money, they start their own sitcom called Quahog Creek, a ripoff of The WB's Dawson's Creek. The theme song "I Don't Want to Wait" uses misinterpreted lyrics of the actual theme song performed by Paula Cole. While Peter and Carter try to steal money from Lois's purse, Peter balances on a unicycle and hums Aram Khachaturian's "Sabre Dance". When waiting in line at the movies, Peter tells Carter about a new movie, The Picnic, starring Jude Law and Renée Zellweger.

A cutaway gag presents a fake early Family Guy clip supposedly from the Tracey Ullman Show, parodying The Simpsons, which did originate as a series of shorts featured on that show. Family Guy producer David A. Goodman comments that, contrary to what some think, the show was not trying to criticize The Simpsons, but, rather, trying to show the differences in voices and character appearance.

== Reception ==
In a review of the Family Guy, Volume Four DVD collection, Mike Drucker of IGN singled out "Peterotica" and "PTV" as "new classics." In a review of the episode, Bob Sassone of TV Squad commented on the scene where Peter acts as a landlord over a rat, writing, "to be honest, I'm not even sure what the hell was going on there, it was so disturbing." Geoffrey D. Roberts of Real Talk Reviews criticized the episode, writing that "the story is thin and the laughter absent." The episode sparked controversy over a depiction of the Charwoman cleaning character, a character used by Carol Burnett in The Carol Burnett Show that was used in the episode without her consent. Burnett sued, but the case was later dismissed. In the Court's opinion, United States District Court for the Central District of California District Judge Dean Pregerson wrote, "Carol Burnett is an icon in American culture as is her character the 'Charwoman.' The Court has no doubt that she is, and rightly so, well known, respected, and beloved by a large segment of the American public based upon her persona and her outstandingly successful entertainment career. The Court fully appreciates how distasteful and offensive the segment is to Ms. Burnett. (...) However, the law, as it must in an open society, provides broad protection for the defendant's segment."
