= Family Guy controversies =

Criticism of American adult animated sitcom

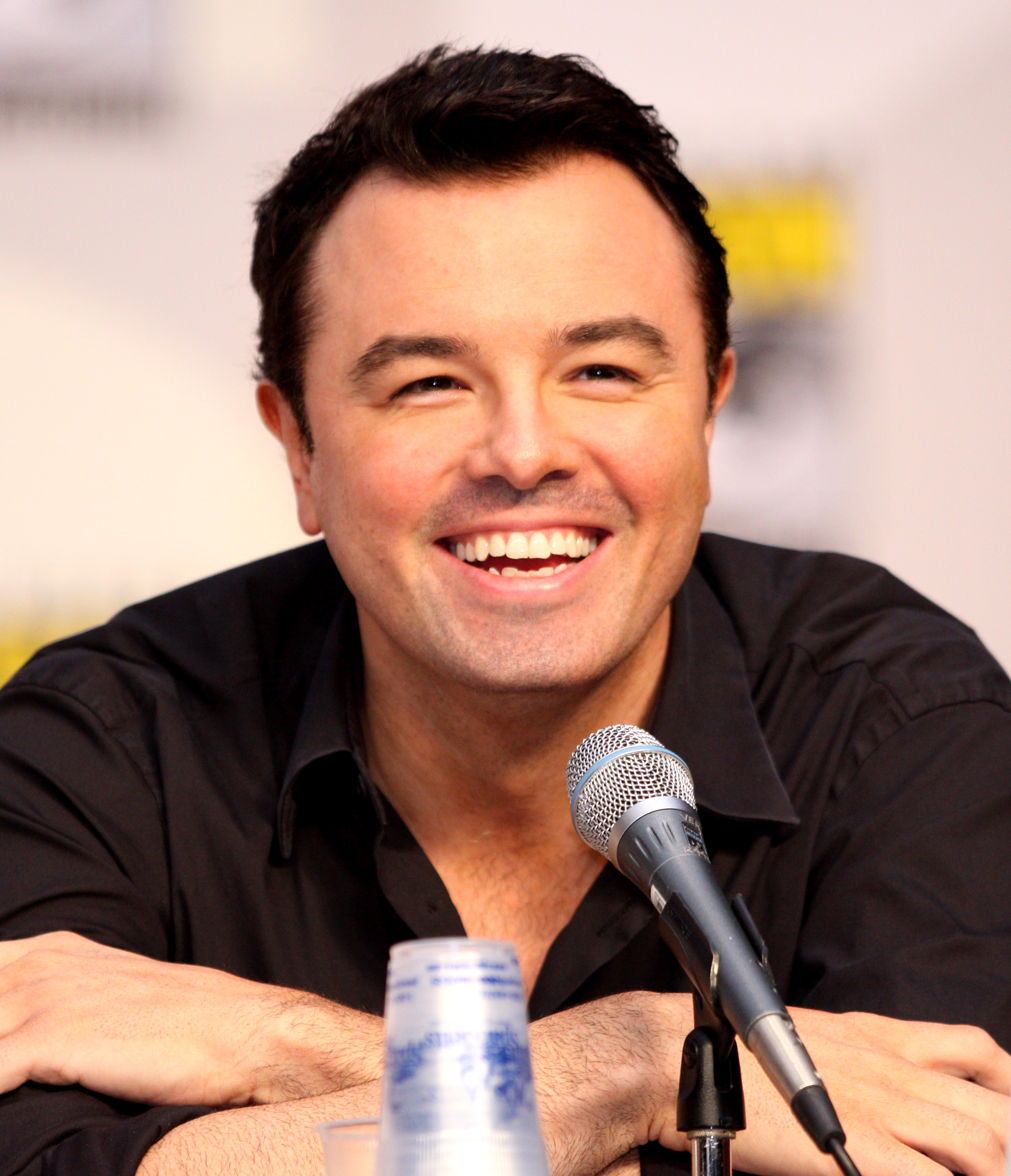
Series creator and executive producer Seth MacFarlane.

The American adult animated sitcom Family Guy has been the target of numerous taste and indecency complaints. The show is known to include offensive jokes including racial humor and violent, gory, and disturbing images.

Critics have targeted Family Guy's reliance on cutaway gags, panning the show for its characterization, excessive pop culture references and writing outside of these gags, and have unfavorably compared the show to contemporaries such as The Simpsons and Comedy Central's South Park; the latter has also parodied and criticized Family Guy in several episodes throughout its run. The show's dark humor and sexual themes have also led to backlash from special interest groups. The Parents Television Council (PTC) has attacked the series since its premiere, deeming it the "Worst TV Show of the Week" on at least 40 occasions, and filing complaints with the Federal Communications Commission (FCC).

== Moral controversy ==
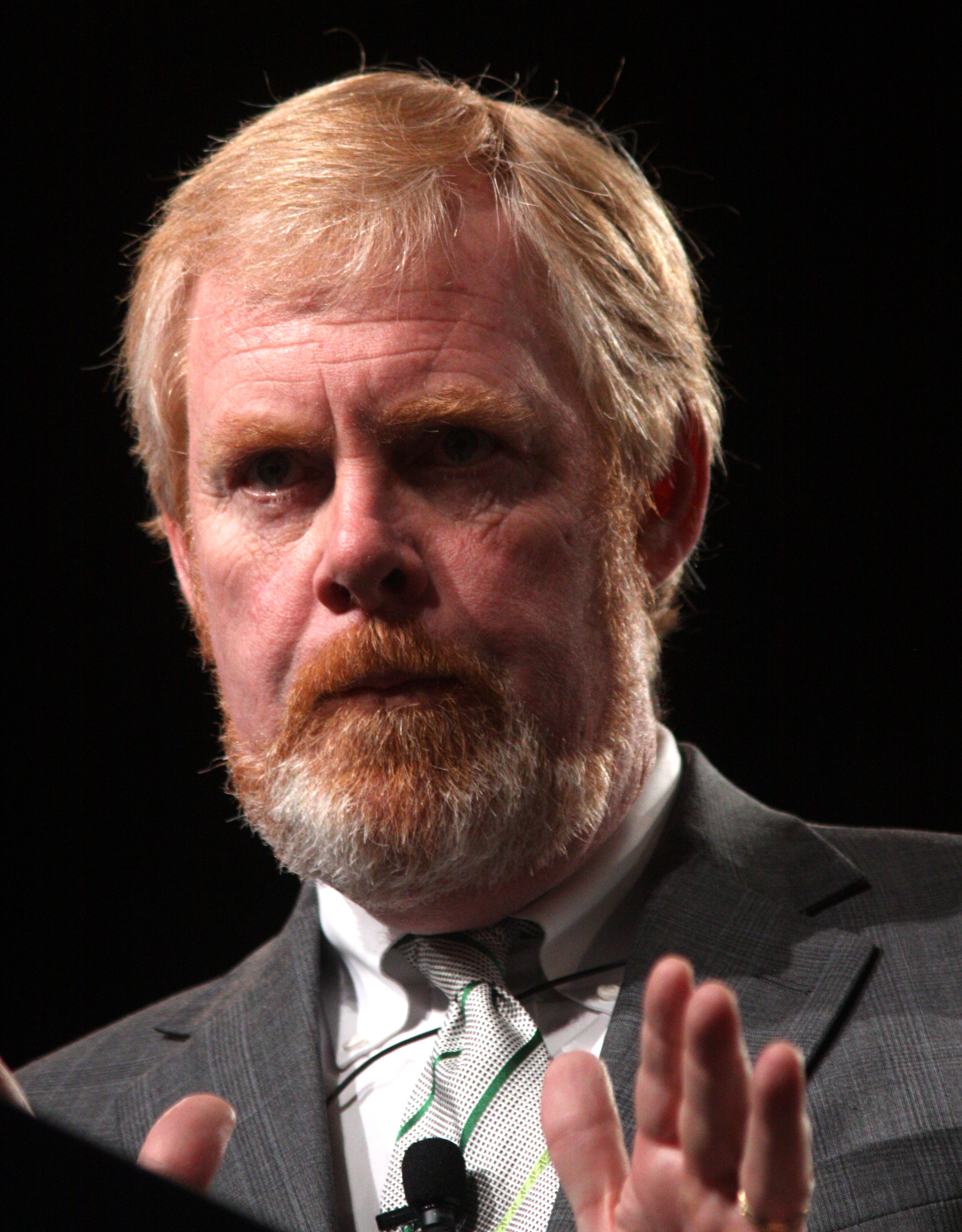
L. Brent Bozell III, founder of the Parents Television Council, has frequently criticized Family Guy for its content and has accused it of anti-Christian themes.

Family Guy's frequent use of offensive jokes and satire has led to controversy. The jokes that receive controversy are often found in the cutaway gags. For example, in the episode "The Cleveland–Loretta Quagmire", Peter and a barbershop quartet sing and dance around the bed of a man with end-stage AIDS. The airing of this episode led to immediate backlash. This cutaway angered audience members and led to protests by several AIDS service organizations. In his 2006 book The Decency Wars: The Campaign to Cleanse American Culture, author Frederick S. Lane described Family Guy as among several television sitcoms that he believed were "aimed at the darker side of family life."

=== Parents Television Council ===
The Parents Television Council (PTC), a conservative non-profit watchdog group, has published critical views of Family Guy. In May 2000, in an email, the PTC launched a letter-writing campaign to the Fox network to persuade the network to cancel Family Guy. This followed the show's return from a long hiatus in its second season, due to what the PTC claimed were "strong advertiser resistance and low ratings". Family Guy made the PTC's 2000, 2005, and 2006 lists of "worst prime-time shows for family viewing", with over forty Family Guy episodes listed as "Worst TV Show[s] of the Week". This was due to profanity, animated nudity, and violence. The series was also named the worst show of the 2006–2007 season by the PTC. In addition, a live-action special hosted by series creator Seth MacFarlane and fellow voice actress Alex Borstein titled Family Guy Presents: Seth & Alex's Almost Live Comedy Show was also named "Worst TV Show of the Week" by the PTC due to what it said were "disgusting sex jokes, crass Holocaust humor, cruel impersonations of deaf people, and loads of bleeped profanity."

The PTC has targeted Fox, criticizing the network for failing to include "S" (sexual content) and "V" (violence) descriptors in content ratings for some Family Guy episodes. The council has cautioned parents that due to the animation style, children might get attracted to the adult show. In order to prevent child viewing, the PTC has objected to Fox scheduling Family Guy during early prime time hours. Additionally, the council has asked Family Guy sponsors such as Wrigley Company and Burger King to stop advertising during the show as their products appeal to kids, due to the show's sexual content. The PTC president then became friends with Seth MacFarlane over a complaint about a 2015 episode.

==== FCC complaints ====
The PTC, which has generated most of the indecency complaints received by the United States Federal Communications Commission (FCC), has filed formal FCC complaints against Family Guy episodes.

- The first indecency complaint was reported following the January 2005 rebroadcast of "And the Wiener Is...". The complaint was denied by the FCC on the grounds "that because of the absence of explicit or graphic descriptions or depictions of any sexual organ, along with the absence of shocking, pandering, and/or titillating effect, the episode ... is not patently offensive."
- In November 2005, during "sweeps" period for the 2005–2006 television season, the PTC launched a campaign for its members to file indecency complaints for sexually explicit humor to the FCC for "PTV", the Family Guy episode that satirized the FCC. However, the PTC had expressed doubt over whether they would formally complain to the FCC over that episode, with the PTC not having logged any complaints filed through their website. In fact, that episode was highlighted in the Fox special TV's Funniest Moments that was broadcast on June 1, 2007. A rerun of the program on August 20 that year was named "Worst of the Week" by the PTC, noting that "PTV" was among the highlights in the special.
- On March 11, 2009, PTC filed complaints about the episode "Family Gay" over claims that the episode contained sexual content in violation of indecency law.
- On December 15, 2009, PTC filed an indecency complaint about the episode "Business Guy" two days after its air date, citing a scene that included a lap dance as a possible violation of federal law regarding broadcast decency.
- In 2010, PTC filed a complaint against the 150th episode of Family Guy, "Brian & Stewie", after taking offense at excretory references. PTC president Tim Winter was quoted saying, "It seems as though Family Guy creator Seth MacFarlane carefully reviewed the legal definition of broadcast indecency and set out to violate it as literally as he could."
- On November 15, 2013, PTC filed an indecency enforcement over the episode "A Fistful of Meg" five days after its air date. The organization cited lewd sexual content and what it considered profane jokes on subjects such as child molestation, exploitation, rape, and sexualised use of food as well as the main plot of a boy bullying and physically attacking a female classmate.
- On February 12, 2015, PTC filed an indecency enforcement over the episode "Quagmire's Mom", citing sexually explicit dialogue and jokes about statutory rape, including a scene where Quagmire had sex with an underage teenage girl but did not know her age until after they'd already had sexual intercourse.

=== Accusations of anti-religious sentiments ===
Family Guy's dark humor commonly involves religious activity, and has received criticism from religious people and groups as a result. In 1999, during the show's second season, Entertainment Weekly TV critic Ken Tucker criticized the show for being antisemitic. The same year, L. Brent Bozell III wrote that he believed the episode "Holy Crap" promoted anti-Catholicism, and was the only episode that was animated by Film Roman to face controversy. After that episode, Family Guy was pulled from the schedule, purportedly due to low ratings. The show briefly returned for one day in December with the following episode "Da Boom". The show was then dropped again for another few months, but returned in March to finish airing the second season.

The PTC has criticized what it perceives as Family Guy's negative treatment of religion, particularly if they portray God or Jesus Christ in a negative, sacrilegious way, concluding in its 2006 report Faith in a Box: Entertainment Television and Religion 2005-2006 that "mockery of God is a constant" on the show. For example, in the episode "The Courtship of Stewie's Father", there is a cutaway gag depicting God as a dirty old man having sex with a prostitute all while brushing off a teen-aged Jesus, who was seeking some help with his quarrel with Joseph. The Media Research Center, also founded by Bozell, was strongly critical of the 2014 episode "The 2000-Year-Old Virgin" in which Jesus emotionally cons people to have sex with their wives. In the same episode, Peter directs people to complain to the "Family Television Council", a thinly disguised reference to the PTC.

On October 3, 2007, the Bourne Company publishing house, the sole copyright holder of the song "When You Wish Upon a Star", filed a lawsuit against the makers of Family Guy, claiming copyright infringement over their song "I Need a Jew". The suit claimed harm to the value of the original song due to the offensive lyrics of the parody. On March 16, 2009, U.S. District Judge Deborah Batts ruled that Family Guy did not infringe Copyright when they transformed the song "When You Wish Upon a Star" for comical use in an episode.

Australian Jewish studies columnist Dvir Abramovich accused a number of Family Guy episodes of ridiculing Jews and Judaism and reinforcing the stereotypes of Jews. In 2014, a writer in the Israeli newspaper Haaretz claimed that a scene in the episode "3 Acts of God" was evidence of long-held antisemitism by MacFarlane.

=== Allegations of insensitivity towards transgender people ===
In May 2010, Family Guy gained negative reception after the episode "Quagmire's Dad" was broadcast. Many people felt this episode was offensive to transgender people. AfterElton.com writer Brent Hartinger gave a negative grade to the episode "Quagmire's Dad", in which Dan Quagmire (Glenn Quagmire's father) comes out as a trans woman, undergoes sex reassignment surgery and adopts the name Ida. While noting that the episode deserves credit for making important points about transgender people, he found its inclusion of a scene where Brian vomits after learning that he had sex with Ida, as well as Lois and Peter's transphobic remarks about her, to be "shockingly insensitive." Hartinger continued, "Frankly, it's literally impossible for me to reconcile last night's episode with MacFarlane's words, unless I come to the conclusion that the man is pretty much a complete idiot." The Gay and Lesbian Alliance Against Defamation, an LGBT media watchdog organization, released a statement about the episode, noting that "GLAAD shares the serious concerns being voiced from members of the community and GLAAD's Entertainment Media Team is addressing these with Fox."

=== Sarah Palin's son controversy ===
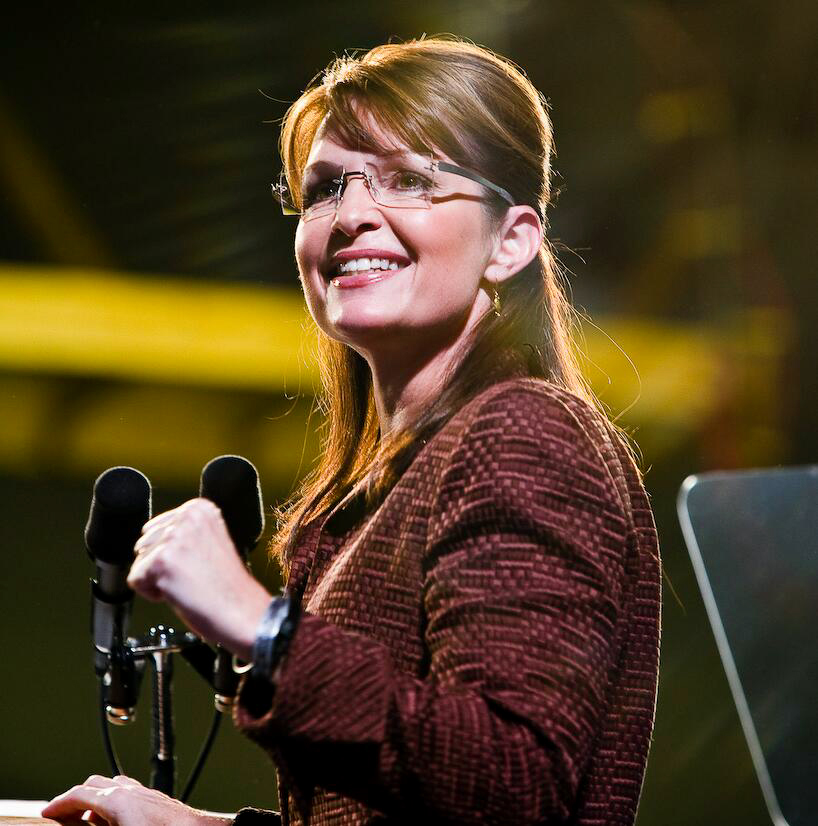
Former U.S. Vice Presidential candidate Sarah Palin criticized Family Guy over the 2010 episode "Extra Large Medium".

In February 2010, the episode "Extra Large Medium," aired in which Ellen, a female character with Down syndrome, mentions that her mother is a former governor of Alaska. Bristol Palin, daughter of former Alaska governor Sarah Palin, criticized the show for mocking her brother Trig, who has Down syndrome. She wrote on her mother's Facebook page stating, "If the writers of a particularly pathetic cartoon show thought they were being clever in mocking my brother and my family yesterday, they failed. All they proved is that they're heartless jerks." Sarah Palin herself also criticized the episode in an appearance on The O'Reilly Factor, calling those who made the show "cruel, cold hearted people."

MacFarlane responded that the series uses biting satire as the basis of its humor and that it was an "equal-opportunity offender." Andrea Fay Friedman, the actress and public speaker who voiced Ellen and who herself has Down syndrome, responded to the criticism, saying that the Palin joke in the show was aimed at Sarah and not her son. She ended this statement concluding that "former Governor Palin does not have a sense of humor." In a subsequent interview, Friedman rebuked Palin personally, saying she was angry with Sarah Palin for using her son Trig as a political prop to pander for votes, explaining that she has a normal life and that Palin's son Trig should be treated as normal rather than like a "loaf of bread."

MacFarlane characterized Palin's outrage as a presumptuous attempt to defend people with Down syndrome, and characterizing Friedman's statement as her way of saying that she does not need feigned pity from Palin.

=== Terri Schiavo controversy ===
In the episode "Peter-assment" (season 8, 2010), Stewie's preschool class performs a play about Terri Schiavo, during which they sing a song that contains lyrics such as "Terri Schiavo is kinda alive-o" and "[She's] the most expensive plant you'll ever see." This was seen as mockery of the disability and death of Schiavo, who sustained massive brain damage and stayed in a persistent vegetative state for many years. Many protests emerged from people who claimed the program showed prejudice against people with brain injuries, including protests from the American Life League and from Schiavo's family. Bobby Schindler Jr., her brother, urged Fox to cancel Family Guy altogether.

=== Domestic violence controversy ===
Media analysts reacted negatively to the treatment of domestic violence in the episode "Screams of Silence: The Story of Brenda Q" (season 10, 2011). A. J. Hammer of Showbiz Tonight said of the episode, "Like so many other people, I was just shocked by what I saw on Family Guy last night...It was really just a depressing half hour of television." Whitney Jefferson of Jezebel, a feminist website, also strongly criticized the episode for its storyline involving Brenda and her boyfriend, Jeff: "Personally, I'm way beyond being offended by the show — I've long been numbed to shock-value offensiveness — and had stopped watching years ago anyhow. But being a sucker for Halloween-themed episodes, I tuned into Fox's "Animation Domination" comedy block last night. What I saw was seriously awful." Jefferson ended her review of the episode by stating that the show was "Definitely the scariest Halloween special we've ever seen."

The show has also been heavily criticized for its frequent depictions of violence against women. "We counted how many successive episodes we could watch before we found one that didn't involve an act of violence against a woman. We managed 14. That's 14 episodes of Family Guy before a 20-minute episode that didn't feature Meg, Lois, or another female character being knocked to the ground, murdered, or slapped."

=== Boston Marathon controversy ===
The episode "Turban Cowboy", aired on March 17, 2013, contained a cutaway gag showing Peter committing mass murder at the Boston Marathon by plowing his car through the runners. After the bombing at the 2013 Boston Marathon, which occurred about a month after the episode's air date, April 15, Fox promptly removed the "Turban Cowboy" episode from Fox.com and Hulu. The network also stated it had no immediate plans to broadcast the episode again (although it was back on the air by 2014).

=== Rape joke controversy ===
The episode "The Simpsons Guy" (a 2014 crossover with The Simpsons) featured Stewie making a rape joke that was shown in the trailer for the episode, which generated controversy before the episode aired. Tim Winter, the President of the Parents Television Council, wrote to Simpsons creator Matt Groening, Seth MacFarlane and Fox about the joke. In it, after Bart's prank call to Moe asking for a man with a crude name, Stewie makes his own prank call, telling Moe that his sister is being raped. Winter felt that jokes about rape make it "less outrageous in real life", and that children who watch The Simpsons but not Family Guy would be unfamiliar with the latter show's brand of humor. A Fox spokesperson declined to comment on the joke. MacFarlane, interviewed by Entertainment Weekly, said that although he would be attacked for stating it as such, the joke was "pretty funny... in context". A spokeswoman from the Rape, Abuse & Incest National Network said, "I think the show is making it clear that rape is not funny by how they are positioning the joke."

=== Portrayal of Russians ===
Yana Lantratova, a regional deputy for the Russian city of Chelyabinsk, criticized the Season 21 finale for negatively portraying the city as contaminated by radiation and its local citizens as drunkards and drug users dissatisfied with life.

== Media critics ==
In addition, Family Guy has been panned by some media critics. Ken Tucker of Entertainment Weekly has frequently panned the show, grading it with a "D", and naming it the worst show of the 1999–2000 television season. Tucker responded to a reader's question in 2005 that he continued to dislike the series. Mark Graham noted "MacFarlane's incredibly rocky relationship with both the magazine and its lead television critic, Ken Tucker" in a blog on the New York magazine website.

== Controversy and criticism within the animation industry ==
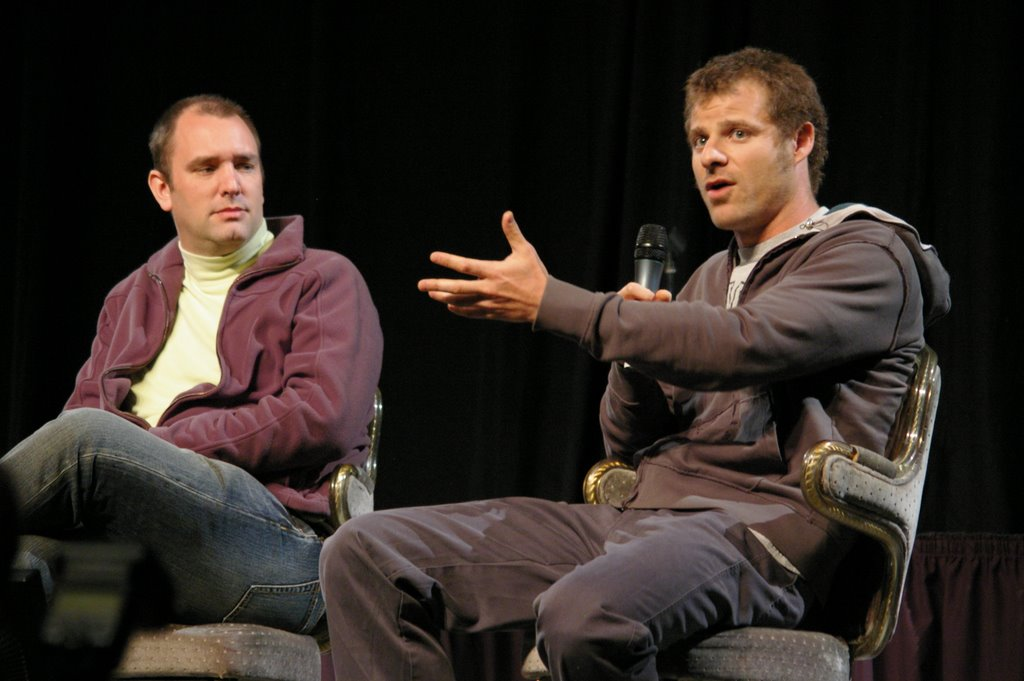
South Park creators Trey Parker and Matt Stone criticized the writing of Family Guy in their own series.

The show's animation has been criticized by Ren & Stimpy creator John Kricfalusi, who expressed concern that the simplistic animation of Family Guy would negatively impact the new wave of content creators.

The show's writing style has also come under criticism from South Park creators Trey Parker and Matt Stone. In a 2006 interview, Parker and Stone stated that they dislike having their show compared to Family Guy. After the episode "Cartoon Wars" – in which the writing process for Family Guy is depicted as consisting of sending manatees to push balls with random pop culture references written on them – aired, Parker states they received support and gratitude from the staffs of The Simpsons and King of the Hill for "ripping on Family Guy."

At San Diego Comic-Con on July 24, 2010, The Simpsons writer Matt Selman jokingly referred to MacFarlane, stating, "Come on, Seth MacFarlane does one show three times." Selman later backed away from the comment, adding, "Those shows are all really funny – they deserve to exist." The animated film Bender's Big Score, based on Groening's show Futurama, featured a Family Guy "12 Laughs A Year" calendar. In a comic book crossover between Groening's two shows, The Simpsons / Futurama Crossover Crisis, Family Guy character Brian Griffin is depicted on a television in Hell.

== Allegations of plagiarism ==
The show has been criticized for being too similar to The Simpsons, with both exemplifying a working-class family with three children, a dog for a pet, and a dim-witted alcoholic father for a protagonist. Several episodes of The Simpsons, including "Missionary: Impossible," "Treehouse of Horror XIII," and "The Italian Bob," have poked fun at Family Guy, with the latter two implying that MacFarlane's show is guilty of plagiarism. However, both MacFarlane and Simpsons creator Matt Groening have said that there is no serious feud between the two of them and their shows. In 2003, The Simpsons writer/producer Al Jean described Family Guy as "a little too derivative of The Simpsons" and said it "should be more original."

Writer Chris Ware, author of Jimmy Corrigan, the Smartest Kid on Earth, has noticed several similarities between the title character of his work and Stewie Griffin. Ware has remarked, "[The similarities are] a little too coincidental to be simply, well, coincidental." He further stated, "I don't want a book of seven years' worth of my stuff to become available and then be accused of being a rip-off of Family Guy." 20th Century Fox Television has insisted that Stewie is an entirely original character. In a 2003 interview, Seth MacFarlane said that he had never seen the comic strip before, described the similarities as "pretty shocking" and said that he "could see how Ware would reach that conclusion."

An incident occurred when an episode of Family Guy included footage from a then seven-year-old YouTube video displaying a glitch in the NES game Double Dribble. The inclusion of the footage in the episode led to the removal of the original video by YouTube's automated content identification system. Within a few days however, the video was reinstated after a backlash from the community. Ultimately Fox released an apology after the video was reinstated.

== Responses ==
=== Parents Television Council ===
MacFarlane, whose other series American Dad! and The Cleveland Show have also been criticized by the PTC, has fired back on several occasions. In a 2008 interview with the magazine The Advocate, he said:

Oh, yeah. That's like getting hate mail from Hitler. They're literally terrible human beings. I've read their newsletter, I've visited their website, and they're just rotten to the core. For an organization that prides itself on Christian values – I mean, I'm an atheist, so what do I know? – they spend their entire day hating people. They can all suck my dick as far as I'm concerned.

=== Gay jokes ===
In January 2019, it was confirmed that Family Guy would no longer write gay jokes. During the episode "Trump Guy" which premiered on January 13, 2019, Peter Griffin, was seen telling a cartoon President Trump that the show was trying to "phase out" gay jokes. The change in direction was confirmed by the show's executive producers Alec Sulkin and Rich Appel, along with creator Seth MacFarlane, who stated that they wanted to better reflect the current climate in the show due to societal changes which have seen the jokes become frowned upon over time.

In the Season 18 episode "Disney's The Reboot" which premiered on October 20, 2019, when asked "I thought I read you guys were phasing out gay jokes?" Peter Griffin replies: "That quote was taken out of context and widely misunderstood."
