= Brian & Stewie =

- Family Guy episode
- Episode no.: Season 8 Episode 17
- Directed by: Dominic Bianchi
- Written by: Gary Janetti
- Production code: 7ACX20
- Original air date: May 2, 2010

Episode chronology
← Previous "April in Quahog"	Next → "Quagmire's Dad"
- Family Guy season 8

"Brian & Stewie" is the 17th episode of the eighth season of the American animated television series Family Guy. It originally aired on Fox in the United States on May 2, 2010. The episode features Brian and Stewie after they are accidentally trapped inside a bank vault over a weekend. The two try to kill each other, and are ultimately forced to reveal their true feelings about each other, and eventually go on to question each other's existence and purpose in life. Brian and Stewie become even closer to each other as time goes on, and climactically help each other survive being trapped inside the vault. The bottle episode breaks from the show's usual set-up and is the only episode of the show not to feature any music or cutaway gags, with Brian and Stewie being the only two characters featured in the entire episode. In repeats of the episode there is no main title sequence, nor is any music played over the end credits.

"Brian & Stewie" was written by Gary Janetti and directed by Dominic Bianchi. The episode received mostly positive reviews from critics for its serious dialogue and development of the two characters and their relationship, although it attracted controversy and criticism from the Parents Television Council for a sequence in which Brian eats Stewie's feces and vomit. According to Nielsen ratings, it was viewed in 7.68 million homes in its original airing. The episode aired along with a series of musical numbers from throughout the show's eight seasons. "Brian & Stewie" was released on DVD along with ten other episodes from the season on December 13, 2011.

== Plot ==
Brian and Stewie visit the local Quahog bank so that Brian can deposit money in his safe deposit box. Stewie then wants to go to a store to return a $3,000 Thom Browne sweater. They are still inside the vault until the door closes at the end of the work day, locking them inside. Frightened, Stewie soils his diaper. Worried he will get a rash from the dirty diaper, Stewie desperately tries to make Brian eat his feces by threatening him with a gun that Brian had stored in his deposit box. They discover that Stewie has a cellphone in his pocket, with only enough charge in the battery for one short phone call. Stewie uses the last of the phone's battery charge to call the clothing store rather than for help. Furious, Brian slaps Stewie, smashes his phone, and yells at him, making him cry. Instantly remorseful, Brian reluctantly agrees to eat Stewie's feces as a way of apologizing. While watching Brian eating, Stewie becomes nauseated and throws up; Stewie then convinces Brian to eat his vomit. Realizing that he has nothing to clean his bottom with, Stewie manages to convince Brian to clean him with his tongue in order to avoid infection. Afterward, they both decide to take a nap, but soon they realize that the next day is Sunday, meaning that they will have to wait another day before they can be released from the vault.

Awaking from his nap, Brian decides to drink a bottle of Glenfiddich scotch whisky that he had stored in his deposit box. He offers Stewie a sip, and they both become so drunk that Brian agrees to pierce Stewie's ear with a pin from his sweater, leaving him with a bloodied ear for the rest of the episode. While talking, Brian revealed he voted for John McCain in 2008. Stewie and Brian discuss The Dog Whisperer and Cesar Millan, and Brian explains that he is inspired by Millan's philosophy about dogs' instinctive ability to live in the present and with purpose. Stewie, however, points out that Brian himself does not appear to live with any specific purpose. Enraged, Brian begins insulting Stewie, who furiously retaliates by revealing that he could have gone all day without having his diaper changed, and only thinks of Brian as a passing amusement and "the best of a bad situation". Stewie dares Brian to shoot him with the revolver in the deposit box. Stewie prematurely causes the gun to discharge, causing the bullet to randomly ricochet off the vault walls, forcing the two under the table to wait for the bullet to stop.

After sobering up and eating energy bars that were in Stewie's bag, Stewie asks Brian why he has a gun, noting that Brian is a staunch gun control proponent and seems to be the last person who would ever own a firearm, even mentioning how Brian cried after the Columbine massacre. Brian refuses to talk about it at first, but eventually admits that he has the gun in case he ever wants to commit suicide (although he clarifies that he came to the bank only so he could shore up his Christmas savings). He confesses that due to his anthropomorphism, he cannot find his purpose in life like other dogs, and finds comfort in knowing he has the option of killing himself; the scotch bottle was intended to serve as a last drink. Though visibly shocked by the revelation, Stewie snaps at Brian, saying that he would be lost without Brian, claiming he is the only person in the world that he really cares about; he admits that his earlier assertion that he did not care about Brian was out of retaliation for Brian's insults, and both admit that they care for each other as friends. Stewie adds that maybe making someone else happy is enough, because it is the best gift one person can give. Stewie falls asleep as Brian reads the beginning of David Copperfield to him. The following morning, the vault door opens, and Brian silently carries a sleeping Stewie and their belongings out of the room.

== Production and development ==
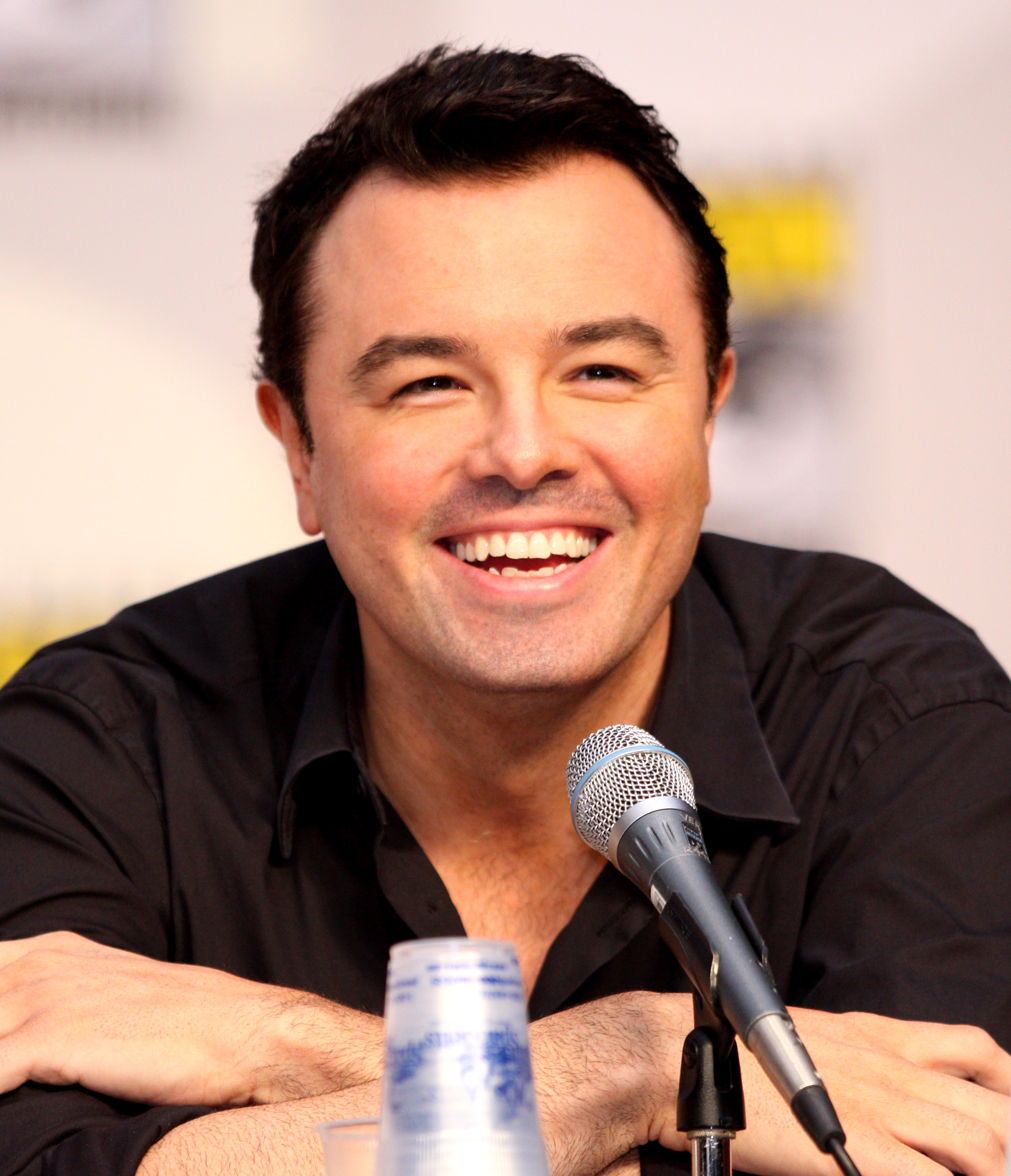
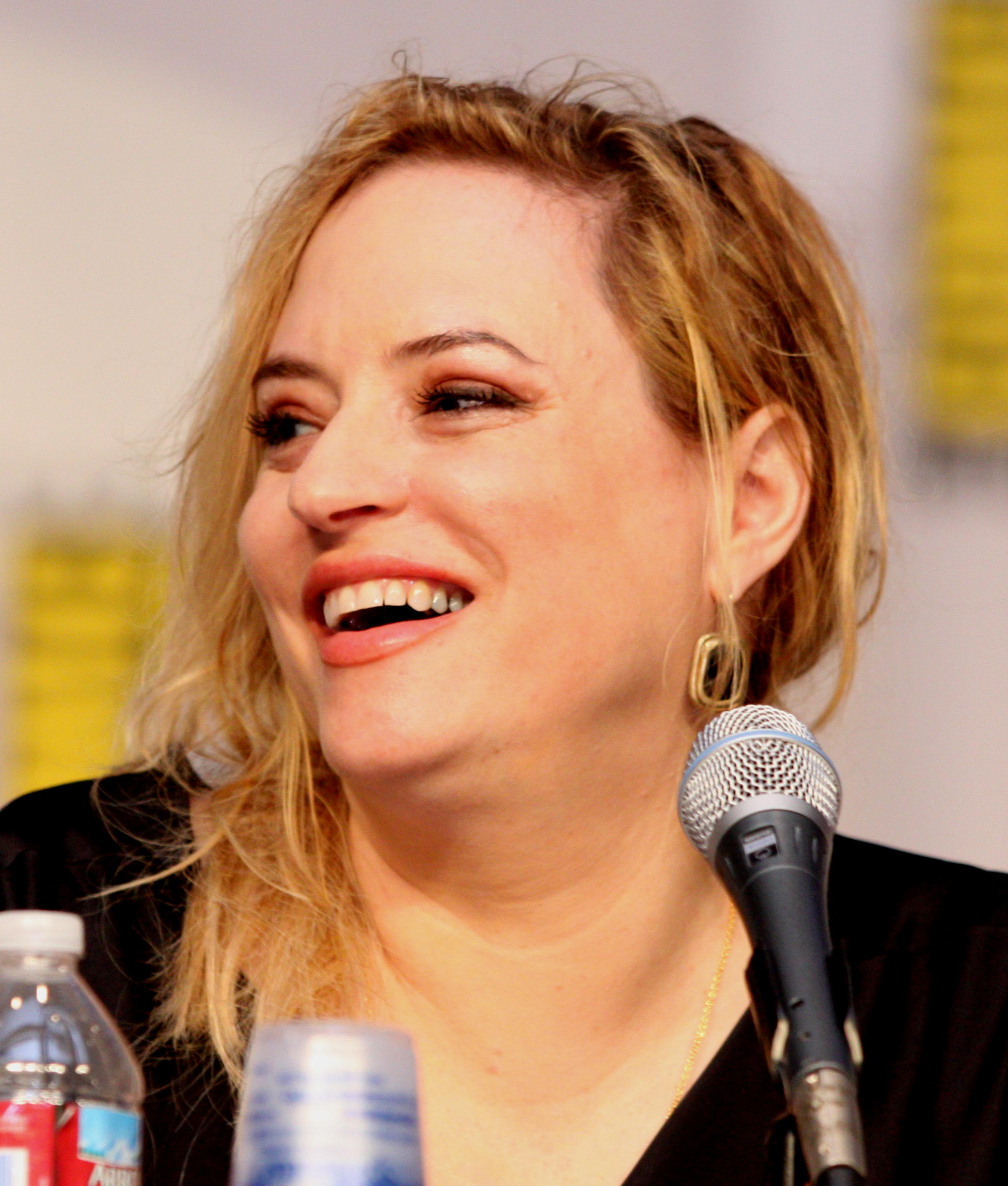
Producer Kara Vallow, along with Seth MacFarlane, came up with the idea for the episode.

The episode was written by series consulting producer Gary Janetti as his second episode of the season, and directed by series regular Dominic Bianchi, also in his second episode of the season. In an interview with Forbes, series producer Kara Vallow revealed that the plot was inspired by an episode of the CBS sitcom All in the Family entitled "Archie in the Cellar," in which Archie Bunker is locked in a cellar, breaking from the show's usual storyline. Vallow and Family Guy creator Seth MacFarlane were fans of All in the Family during its original airing and came up with the original concept for the episode. Vallow went on to state that the episode "[is] like a one-act stage play in a way," because it "[doesn't] rely on our standard cutaways and gags." In a first for the series, the only voice actor to perform in the episode was series creator and executive producer Seth MacFarlane, who portrays both characters. In addition, neither composer Ron Jones nor composer Walter Murphy contributed any background music to the episode whatsoever. The writer of the episode, Gary Janetti, wrote the episode based on a loose script written by MacFarlane, as well as various phone conversations about the structure of the storyline, and the various acts.

"Brian & Stewie", along with the eleven other episodes from Family Guy's eighth season, was released on a three-disc DVD set in the United States on December 13, 2011. The sets include brief audio commentaries by various crew and cast members for several episodes, a collection of deleted scenes and animatics, a special mini-feature which discussed the process behind animating "And Then There Were Fewer", a mini-feature entitled "The Comical Adventures of Family Guy – Brian & Stewie: The Lost Phone Call", and footage of the Family Guy panel at the 2010 San Diego Comic-Con.

In its initial airing, the episode aired with a framing device involving Stewie and Brian standing in front of a red curtain and addressing the television audience. The two begin the program by introducing the "very special" episode and, after the episode aired, conclude it by introducing a series of musical numbers. Together, the episode and musical number aired as an hour-long special, in celebration of a week-long "Fox Rocks" television event. The initial airing included musical numbers from the fourth-season episode "The Fat Guy Strangler", the sixth-season episode "Play It Again, Brian", and the eighth-season episode "Business Guy", as well as other numbers, including "You've Got A Lot to See" from "Brian Wallows and Peter's Swallows", "Shipoopi" from "Patriot Games", and "My Drunken Irish Dad" from the episode "Peter's Two Dads". In repeats of the episode the usual main title sequence is replaced by a still shot of the show's logo on a black background, whilst the end credits are shown without any musical accompaniment.

== Cultural references ==
In addition to "Archie in the Cellar", the plot of the episode is inspired by the All in the Family episode "Two's a Crowd", in which Archie and Mike are locked in a storeroom, drink brandy, and share their deepest secrets. The episode also makes reference to an episode of The Twilight Zone entitled "Time Enough at Last", in which a banker named Henry Bemis sneaks into a bank vault and is knocked unconscious. In the episode, Henry Bemis is reading a copy of David Copperfield, which Brian also reads during the episode. The beginning of the episode mentions Turner & Hooch.

== Reception ==
" The episode is essentially Seth MacFarlane talking to himself for a half hour, with no cutaway gags, very little music, and no characters other than Brian and Stewie. It's a big change from the usual and I have to say I like it. The old shtick was getting very tired, and the past few episodes showed a remarkable lack of ingenuity and real humor, but the story here has a lot going for it."

— Ramsey Isler, IGN.

In an improvement over the previous six episodes, the episode was viewed in 7.68 million homes in its original airing, according to Nielsen ratings, despite airing simultaneously with Desperate Housewives on ABC, Celebrity Apprentice on NBC and Cold Case on CBS. The episode also acquired a 3.7 rating in the 18–49 demographic, beating The Simpsons, The Cleveland Show, as well as the accompanying musical special, which received a total rating of 3.3.

The episode received mixed reviews from critics. Reviewers disliked the episode's moments of gross-out humor, but frequently lauded its serious tone and subject matter, as well as its break from the show's formula. Emily VanDerWerff of The A.V. Club believed that the show's concept, which allowed only two characters and a single scene, was "ambitious" but that the end result was "flaccid." She commented that with no cut-away gags or side plots, the episode was "basically everything critics of the show would like the show to have" but was deprived of Family Guy's trademark fast pace and reduced to "a series of what amounts to grossout comedy sketches." Television critic Ramsey Isler of IGN added that the gross-out humor "didn't work for me" and found the "more serious stuff" in the episode to be the most entertaining. Said Isler, "the addition of more dramatic themes and the elimination of the cutaway gags really showed what this show could be if Seth [MacFarlane] and team put more effort in." In a subsequent review of Family Guy's eighth season, Isler listed "Brian & Stewie" as being "surprisingly dramatic," and, "had it not been for the extended poop-eating jokes and rehashed musical numbers in the second half, I'd say it was one of the better efforts the show has ever put out." Jason Hughes of TV Squad was also "more than a little disturbed" by the amount of time spent on Stewie's soiled diaper. However, he noted, "I didn't laugh much at 'Brian & Stewie', but I found myself absolutely captured by their discussion throughout the episode." Ken Tucker of Entertainment Weekly described the episode as "tedious, predictably vulgar, and, by the end, sentimental." Adam Rosenberg of MTV wrote, "Beneath all of the more disturbing elements there's actually some very thoughtful, mature discussion of suicide and what love means amidst it all." Andrew Hanson of the Los Angeles Times found the soiled diaper gag "too sick to watch" and "the grossest" moment featured in Family Guy so far, but conceded that that may have been the producer's intention. Still, Hanson described Brian's suicidal confession as "deep" and stated, "It’s nice to see that Family Guy is still trying new things and going out on a limb even at episode No. 150." Tom Eames of entertainment website Digital Spy placed the episode at number seven on his listing of the best Family Guy episodes in order of "yukyukyuks" and said he "loved" this episode due its feature of Brian and Stewie's relationship. He added that the episode was "particularly great" because it featured no cutaway gags and was a two-hander, noting that "Clearly, the writers know exactly what the fans want."

The Parents Television Council, a conservative media watchdog group and frequent critic of MacFarlane-produced programs, called on the Federal Communications Commission to investigate Family Guy after the episode aired, citing the scenes where Brian is talked into eating Stewie's feces and vomit. PTC president Tim Winter said that, "Given the patently offensive depictions of one character eating excrement out of a diaper, then eating vomit, and finally licking the remaining excrement from a baby’s bottom – while the baby expresses physical gratification from having his bottom licked – we believe that the broadcast decency law has been broken. It seems as though Family Guy creator, Seth MacFarlane, carefully reviewed the legal definition of broadcast indecency and set out to violate it as literally as he could." The Parents Television Council went on to name the episode as its "Worst TV Show of the Week", ending the week of May 7, 2010, citing the extreme indecency of the episode.
