= Extra Large Medium =

- Family Guy episode
- Episode no.: Season 8 Episode 12
- Directed by: John Holmquist
- Written by: Steve Callaghan
- Production code: 7ACX14
- Original air date: February 14, 2010

Guest appearances
- Jennifer Birmingham; Jackson Douglas; Andrea Fay Friedman as Ellen; Phil LaMarr as Black Guy; Michele Lee as Estelle; Nana Visitor as USS Enterprise

Episode chronology
← Previous "Dial Meg for Murder"	Next → "Go, Stewie, Go!"
- Family Guy season 8

"Extra Large Medium" is the 12th episode of the eighth season of the animated comedy series Family Guy. Directed by John Holmquist and written by Steve Callaghan, the episode originally aired on Fox in the United States on February 14, 2010. In "Extra Large Medium", Peter discovers that he has supposedly developed "extrasensory perception" (ESP) after his two sons, Chris and Stewie, go missing during a family hike in the woods. Soon after being rescued, Chris decides to ask out a classmate at his school, named Ellen, who has Down syndrome, and eventually takes her on a romantic date, which he goes on to regret. Meanwhile, Peter begins performing psychic readings, but is eventually discovered to be faking his ability once he is approached by the town's police force.

The episode generated significant controversy. Former Governor of Alaska and 2008 Republican vice-presidential nominee Sarah Palin, who is referenced briefly in the episode as being the mother of Ellen, took offense to the episode's portrayal of Down syndrome, due to her son being diagnosed with the disorder. Andrea Fay Friedman, who was also diagnosed with Down syndrome and portrayed the character of Ellen, publicly refuted Palin, instead supporting executive producer and series creator Seth MacFarlane, who defended the episode, and was also supported by Bill Maher, the host of Real Time. The episode got more criticism from the Parents Television Council during its original broadcast.

Despite the controversy, critical responses to the episode were mostly positive; critics praised its storyline, numerous cultural references, and its portrayal of a person with Down syndrome. According to Nielsen ratings, it was viewed in 6.42 million homes in its original airing. The episode featured guest performances by Jennifer Birmingham, Jackson Douglas, Andrea Fay Friedman, Phil LaMarr, Michele Lee and Nana Visitor, along with several recurring guest voice actors for the series. It was nominated for a Primetime Emmy Award for Outstanding Original Music and Lyrics, for the episode's song entitled "Down Syndrome Girl", at the 62nd Primetime Emmy Awards. Both Walter Murphy and MacFarlane were recognized for their work on the music and lyrics. "Extra Large Medium" was released on DVD, along with 11 other episodes from the season, on December 13, 2011.

== Plot ==
When the Griffin family decide to go for a hike in the local woods, Chris and Stewie get lost while chasing after a floating butterfly. As a result, they go missing for several days, with only limited supplies. As Lois is at her wits' end, she decides to see a psychic medium who assures her of the children's safety and well-being. Eventually the boys are found and rescued by Bruce, and returned to their home in Quahog which only furthers Lois' psychic obsession to the annoyance of a skeptical Brian. In defiance of Lois' assertion that extrasensory perception exists, Brian has Peter perform a cold reading on a passerby in the park in order to demonstrate that psychic readings are purely an act, and not real. However, Peter is struck by his success as a medium, convincing himself that he actually has extrasensory perception, and decides to capitalize on it by opening his own psychic readings business and performing in front of a live audience. Soon after, Peter's bluff is finally called when Joe requests his help in a frantic search for a missing person who has been strapped to a bomb. Peter stalls for time during the search (as he just wants to feel the victim's daughter's breasts, and claims to possess the spirit of Lou Costello, reenacting the Who's on First? routine when it is revealed the victim is named Melvin Hu), eventually resulting in a gruesome death when the bomb explodes, prompting Peter to flatly admit that he actually has no psychic powers whatsoever.

Meanwhile, during the time when Chris and Stewie were lost in the woods, Chris promises to ask out Ellen, a classmate of his who has Down syndrome. After their rescue, Stewie helps prepare Chris for a date by dressing him up, and instructing him on how to act through a prolonged musical number. During the date, however, Chris becomes exasperated when Ellen turns out to be very rude, pushy and demanding. Chris admits that he had bought into a stereotype of people with Down syndrome being different, and she tells him to leave, ending their relationship. Stewie consoles Chris by congratulating him for demonstrating courage, in asking her out on a date, as he had promised to do.

== Production and development ==
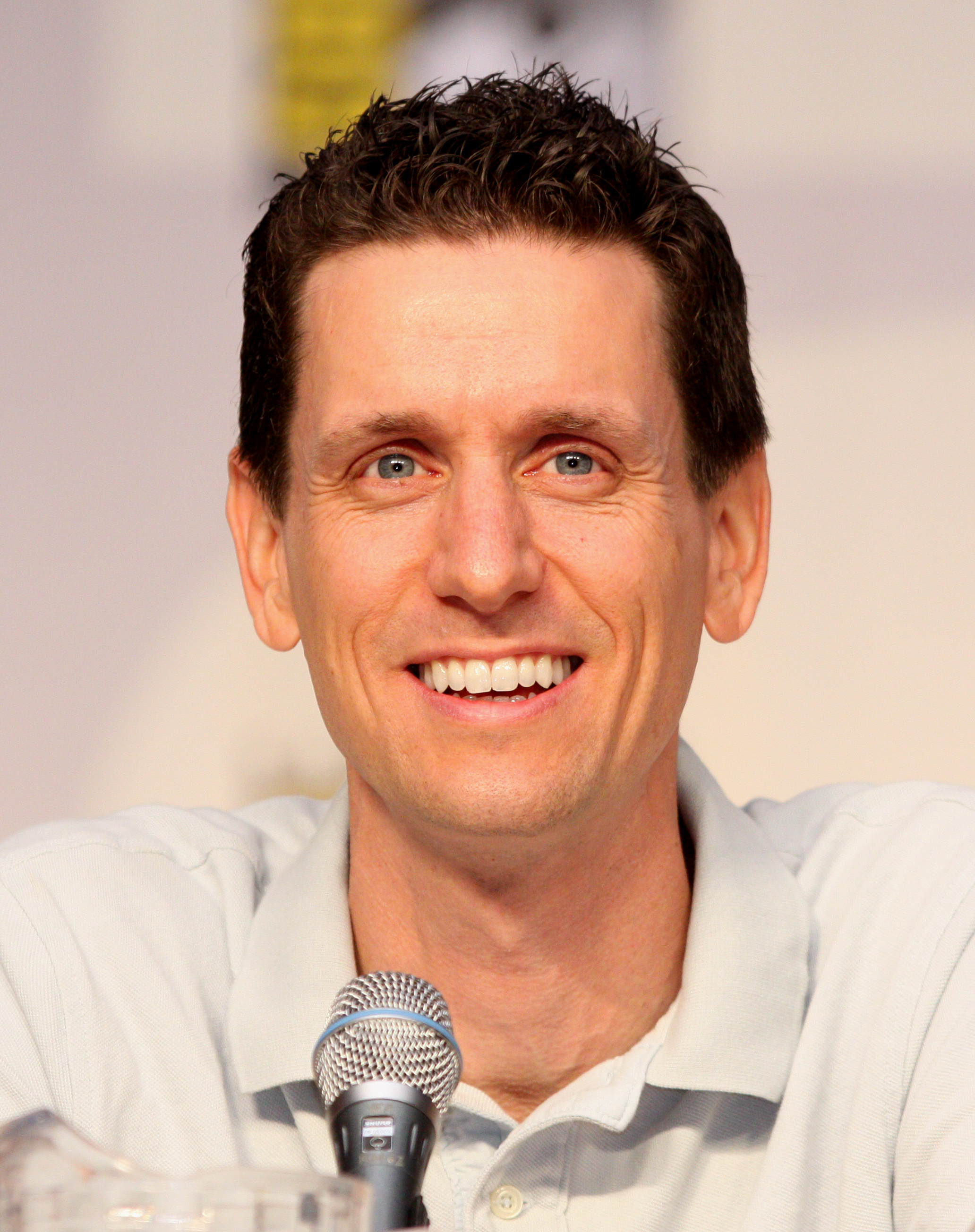
Steve Callaghan wrote the episode.

The episode was directed by series regular John Holmquist, and written by series show runner Steve Callaghan before the conclusion of the eighth production season. Series regulars Peter Shin and James Purdum served as supervising directors, with Seth MacFarlane and David Zuckerman working as staff writers for the episode. Composer Walter Murphy, who has worked on the series since its inception, returned to compose the music for "Extra Large Medium".

Actress Andrea Fay Friedman, who was diagnosed with Down syndrome at birth, and who has appeared on several television shows, including Saving Grace and Life Goes On, voiced the character Ellen. Before performing on the show, Friedman stated in an interview that she had never watched Family Guy, but found it to be "funny" after watching several episodes from the series. In developing Friedman's character, her physical appearance was largely used in creating Ellen, in addition to adding a "bossy" personality to the character, which Friedman was reluctant to perform at first. She eventually "had a nice time" performing the script, however, as it was her first voice acting performance.

"Extra Large Medium", along with the eleven other episodes from the first half of Family Guy's eighth season, was released on a three-disc DVD set in the United States on December 13, 2011. The sets include brief audio commentaries by various crew and cast members for several episodes, a collection of deleted scenes and animatics, a special mini-feature which discussed the process behind animating "And Then There Were Fewer", a mini-feature entitled "The Comical Adventures of Family Guy – Brian & Stewie: The Lost Phone Call", and footage of the Family Guy panel at the 2010 San Diego Comic-Con.

In addition to the regular cast, voice actress Jennifer Birmingham, actor Jackson Douglas, Andrea Fay Friedman, voice actor Phil LaMarr, singer Michele Lee, and actress Nana Visitor guest starred in the episode. Recurring guest voice actors Lori Alan, writer Danny Smith, writer Alec Sulkin and writer John Viener also made minor appearances. Recurring guest voice actors Patrick Warburton and Adam West made guest appearances as well.

== Cultural references ==
Peter mentions starring in Starlight Express, which is a rock musical by Andrew Lloyd Webber; although Peter's role as shown onscreen has little to do with the actual performance. While Stewie and Chris are lost in the forest overnight, Stewie plays a guessing game with one of the answers being Thornton Melon. Stewie looks at the television audience wondering why the majority of them chose Thornton Melon, then Stewie notes that Thornton Melon was the character that Rodney Dangerfield played in the 1986 film Back to School. It was in fact a quote by Henry David Thoreau. Stewie's reference to a newspaper headline saying "Stewie Defeats Truman" is a takeoff of the famous "Dewey Defeats Truman" headline, which erroneously predicted that Thomas E. Dewey would defeat Harry S. Truman in the 1948 presidential election. Peter's new career as a psychic is a parody of John Edward and his TV series Crossing Over. While the police depend on Peter to help them find someone, Peter stalls by pretending to channel the spirit of Lou Costello; his exchange with Joe about the missing man, Mr. Hu who lives on First Street, is a takeoff of the famous Abbott and Costello routine "Who's on First?". A cutaway to the Enterprise from the original Star Trek series shows Spock winning the lottery. Nana Visitor voiced the Enterprise viewscreen, while series writer and producer John Viener voiced Spock.

== Reception ==
"Extra Large Medium" was broadcast on February 14, 2010, in the United States as part of the animation television night on Fox. It was preceded by an episode of The Simpsons, and Family Guy creator and executive producer Seth MacFarlane's spin-off, The Cleveland Show. It was followed by MacFarlane's second show American Dad!. The episode was viewed by an estimated 6.42 million viewers, according to the Nielsen ratings, despite airing simultaneously with the 2010 Winter Olympics on NBC, Undercover Boss on CBS and Extreme Makeover: Home Edition on ABC. The episode also acquired a 3.2/8 rating in the 18–49 demographic beating The Simpsons, The Cleveland Show and American Dad!, in addition to significantly edging out all three shows in total viewership. The episode's ratings were slightly up from the previous episode, "Dial Meg for Murder".

Reviews of the episode were positive, citing the episode as "a pleasant surprise." In a simultaneous review of the episodes of The Simpsons and American Dad! that preceded and followed the episode respectively and The Cleveland Show, Emily VanDerWerff of The A.V. Club commented that she felt that the Chris plot line was "hung together in a way the storylines usually don't on this show," adding that, "I'll give the show points for both degree of difficulty and pulling off something I didn't think it would." In the conclusion of her review, VanDerWerff rated the episode as a B−, beating only The Cleveland Show episode "Buried Pleasure". In a slightly less positive review, Ramsey Isler of IGN gave the episode a 7.7 out of 10, and began his assessment of the episode by stating, "This one will certainly get some politically correct Down syndrome advocates all riled up, but Family Guy is nothing without a little controversy." Isler went on to call the plot "uneven in quality," but with "some moments that could be in the Family Guy 'greatest hits' archive." Television critic Jason Hughes of the TV Squad called the Abbott and Costello joke "hilariously appropriate", and stated that the episode's portrayal of a person with Down syndrome was "refreshing."

On July 8, 2010, the episode's song entitled "Down Syndrome Girl" was nominated for a Primetime Emmy Award for Outstanding Music and Lyrics at the 62nd Primetime Emmy Awards. Series creator Seth MacFarlane and composer Walter Murphy were nominated for their work on the song's lyrics and music. On July 24, 2010, MacFarlane gave a live performance of the song at the 2010 San Diego Comic-Con, to an audience of nearly 4,200 attendees. At the Creative Arts Awards on August 21, 2010, "Down Syndrome Girl" lost to the USA Network series Monk.

=== Controversy ===
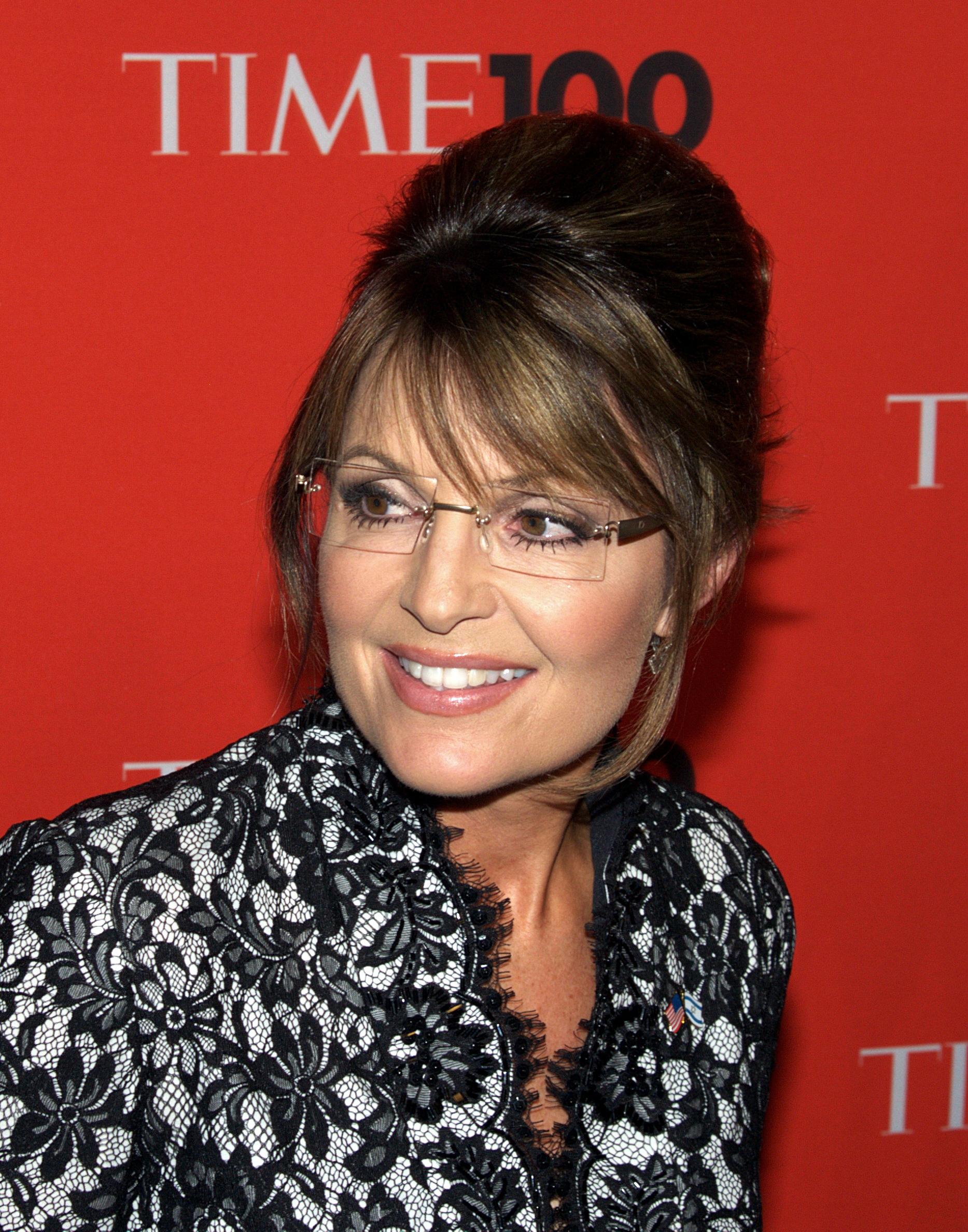
Former Governor Sarah Palin took offense to the episode.

At one point, Ellen states that her mother is the former Governor of Alaska, which strongly implies that her mother is Sarah Palin, the only woman to have served in the office of governor in the state. Palin's daughter Bristol publicly stated on her mother's Facebook profile on February 16, 2010, that she took offense to the episode, feeling that it mocked her brother, Trig, who has Down syndrome, commenting, "If the writers of a particularly pathetic cartoon show thought they were being clever in mocking my brother and my family yesterday, they failed. All they proved is that they're heartless jerks." Sarah Palin also criticized the episode in an appearance on The O'Reilly Factor, calling those who made the show "cruel, cold-hearted people." The writer of the episode, Steve Callaghan, addressed Palin's criticism of the episode at San Diego Comic-Con on July 24, 2010, in talking about the upcoming ninth season of the show, stating, "This season, I decided that I'd even things out and write something that would offend smart people."

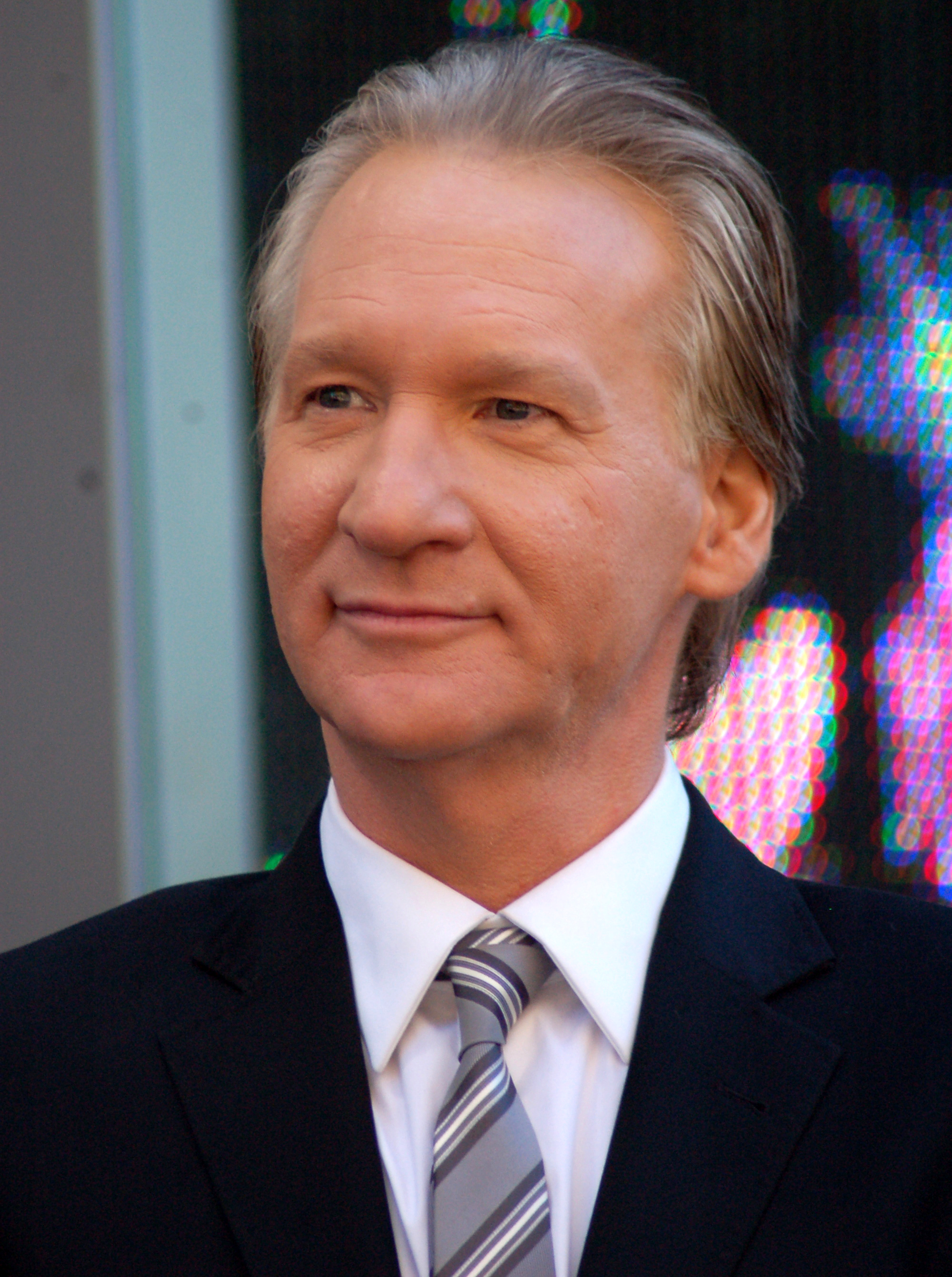
Bill Maher supported MacFarlane and the episode.

In an interview with the Los Angeles Times, Seth MacFarlane responded to Palin's criticism, saying that the series always uses satire as the basis of its humor, and that the show is an "equal-opportunity offender." In addition, Andrea Fay Friedman, who voiced Ellen, and who herself has Down syndrome, also responded to the criticisms saying that the joke was aimed at Sarah Palin and not her son, and that "former Governor Palin does not have a sense of humor." In a subsequent interview, Friedman rebuked Palin, accusing her of using her son, Trig, as a political prop to pander for votes, saying that she has a normal life and that Palin's son should be treated as normal, rather than like a "loaf of French bread." Later, MacFarlane addressed both Palin's statement and Friedman's rebuttal in an appearance on Real Time with Bill Maher calling Palin's outrage a presumptuous attempt to defend people with Down syndrome, and characterizing Friedman's statement as her way of saying that she does not need feigned pity from Palin. Family Guy cast member Patrick Warburton stated that he objected to the joke, saying, "I know that you have to be an equal-opportunity offender, but there are some things that I just don't think are funny." While frequent MacFarlane critic Parents Television Council touched on the Palin controversy in its assessment of the episode, the rest of the show's content—which contained "mean-spirited pot-shots, explicit language, and strong sexual content"—earned the watchdog group's "Worst TV Show of the Week" title. The PTC specifically cited the Broadway-style song, which the PTC said "contained all the stereotypes of mental retardation" and "disturbing sexual references," and the climactic scene in the subplot, where Peter pretends to be a psychic, which the PTC said also contained sexual humor.
