= TV Watch =

TV Watch may refer to:

- Television Watch coalition, a Charleston, South Carolina
- Seiko TV Watch, a watch with a built-in television made by Seiko; see List of Japanese inventions and discoveries

== See also ==
- The Watch (TV series)
- TX Watch Company
