= April in Quahog =

- Family Guy episode
- Episode no.: Season 8 Episode 16
- Directed by: Joseph Lee
- Written by: John Viener
- Production code: 7ACX18
- Original air date: April 11, 2010

Guest appearances
- James Burkholder as Grandson; Anne Hathaway as herself; Jason Mraz as Some Guy with a Hat; Wendy Schaal as Francine Smith (uncredited)

Episode chronology
← Previous "Brian Griffin's House of Payne"	Next → "Brian & Stewie"
- Family Guy season 8

"April in Quahog" is the 16th episode of the eighth season of the animated comedy series Family Guy. It originally aired on Fox in the United States on April 11, 2010. The episode features the Griffins attempting to live out their last day on Earth, after an announcement on the local news about a black hole that is sucking in the entire solar system. As the countdown approaches zero, Peter suddenly reveals his secret dislike of being in his children's presence, seconds before the world is expected to end. Then it is revealed that it is all an April Fools' prank, and Peter is left to attempt to win back his children's respect.

The episode was written by John Viener and directed by Joseph Lee. It received mixed reviews from critics for its storyline and many cultural references. According to Nielsen ratings, it was viewed in 6.93 million homes in its original airing. The episode featured guest performances by James Burkholder, Anne Hathaway and Jason Mraz, along with several recurring guest voice actors for the series. "April in Quahog" was released on DVD along with ten other episodes from the season on December 13, 2011.

== Plot ==
The local news reports that Stephen Hawking has discovered a new black hole at the edge of the Solar System, but the Griffin family pays no attention to the announcement. Peter then alerts the family that he has been selected for jury duty, which he believes is an exclusive experience. After Brian informs him that everyone serves jury duty at some point, Peter tries to be kicked out of court by annoying the others, expressing fabricated prejudices, singing "Surfin' Bird", and attempting to discuss the trial outside of the courtroom. When Peter returns home that night, the local news announces that the Earth will be destroyed by the newly discovered, and continually expanding, black hole within the next 24 hours. Frantic over the news, everyone in Quahog attempts to live out the best last day possible. Herbert finally attempts to have sex with Chris, Quagmire has sex with Bonnie, and Peter manages to steal a lion from the zoo and say the "you-know-what word" in a black neighborhood - he is well respected as a result. As the countdown reaches its final seconds, Peter confesses to Lois that while he loves her, he hates spending time with his children. Immediately afterward, the news anchors reveal the black hole report was an April Fools' prank.

Despite Peter saying he was joking when he said he hates spending time with them, Meg, Chris and Stewie don't buy it and prevent themselves from making contact with him. Peter confesses to Lois that his adversity to being in his children’s presence is due to him finding them boring. After realizing how angry they are, Peter tries to reconcile with his children by spending time with each of them. Peter tries to attempt to learn about his children's interests, first by asking Meg about her period, which she claims is not an interest but something she cannot control, then by asking Chris to do methamphetamine with him as a father-son activity, and finally by asking Stewie about his toys; the latter two result in him getting high on the meth and destroying the wall of Chris' room and the roof in Stewie's room, none of which does anything to help him. After a heartfelt speech does not work, Peter finally buys his children's love by giving them a new Xbox 360, and they proclaim Peter "the best father ever". At the end of the episode, Meg asks if she can play the Xbox, but Peter is playing Call of Duty: Modern Warfare 2, albeit terribly, causing Quagmire and Joe to tell Peter he sucks at the game.

== Production and development ==
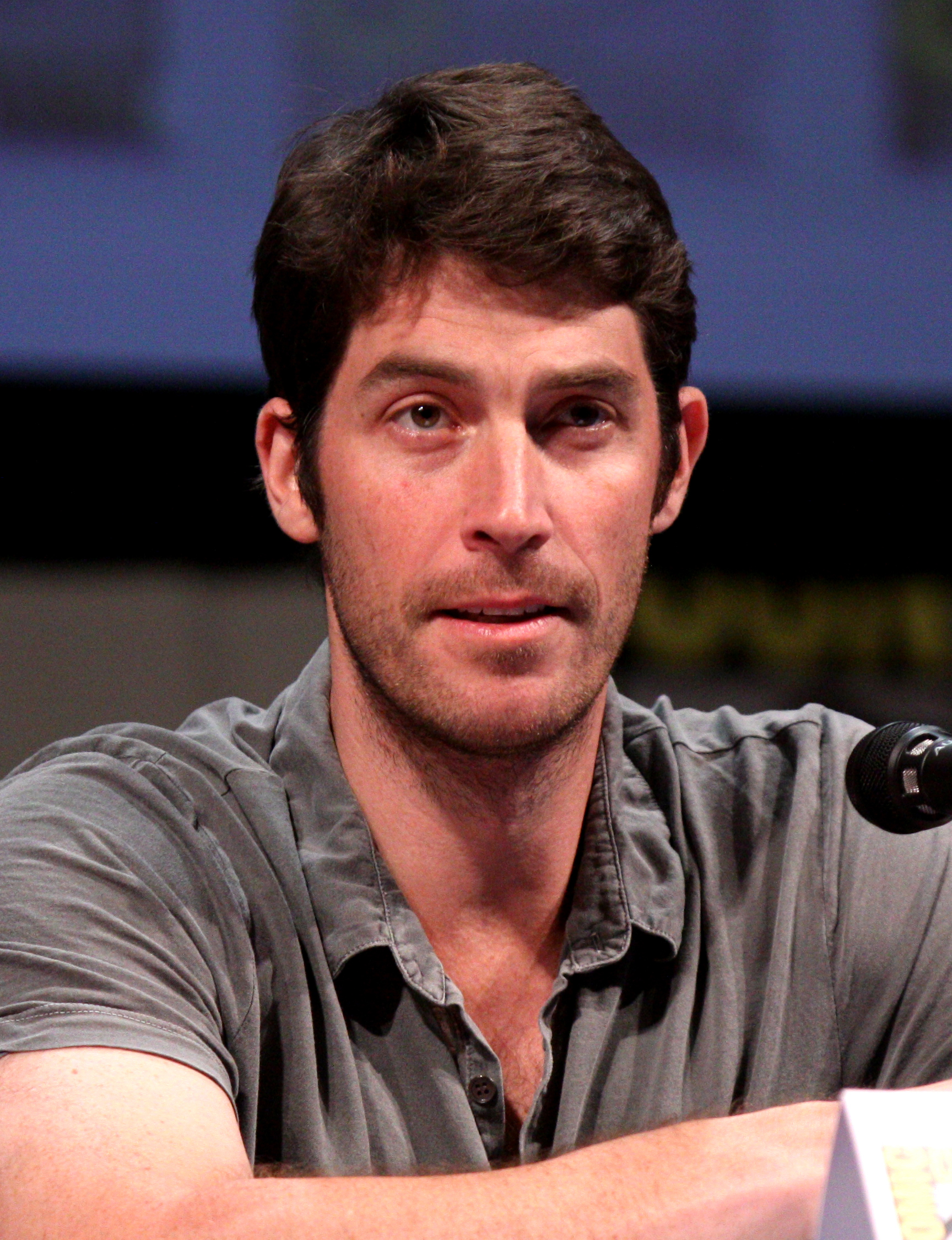
John Viener wrote the episode.

As his first official episode for the series, the episode was directed by Joseph Lee, who had previously served as an assistant director and storyboard artist for the show. In addition, the episode was written by series regular John Viener, his second episode for the season, the first being "Jerome is the New Black". In promoting the episode, an image of Stan and Francine Smith meeting and speaking with Lois and Peter, along with an image of Peter, Brian, Joe and Quagmire drinking cans of beer in front of the house from King of the Hill was released by 20th Century Fox. A press release of a purported crossover was also made public. Having released the information on April Fools' Day, the crossover was revealed to be an April Fools' prank after the episode aired without a crossover occurring.

"April in Quahog", along with the eleven other episodes from Family Guy's eighth season, was released on a three-disc DVD set in the United States on December 13, 2011. The sets include brief audio commentaries by various crew and cast members for several episodes, a collection of deleted scenes and animatics, a special mini-feature which discussed the process behind animating "And Then There Were Fewer", a mini-feature entitled "The Comical Adventures of Family Guy – Brian & Stewie: The Lost Phone Call", and footage of the Family Guy panel at the 2010 San Diego Comic-Con.

In addition to the regular cast, voice actor James Burkholder, actress Anne Hathaway and singer and performer Jason Mraz guest starred in the episode. Recurring guest voice actors Lori Alan, Johnny Brennan, Chris Cox, Ralph Garman, writer and showrunner Mark Hentemann, voice actor Phil LaMarr, writer Chris Sheridan, writer Danny Smith, writer Alec Sulkin and writer John Viener also made minor appearances. Recurring guest voice actors Adam West and Patrick Warburton made guest appearances as well.

== Cultural references ==
In the opening scene of the episode, the Griffin family is seen watching the Channel 5 News, with Tricia Takanawa then beginning an interview with Stephen Hawking. Hawking, who is paralyzed due to neuro-muscular dystrophy, is seen sitting in his wheelchair. After the camera cuts, Hawking then jumps up from his chair, and admits it is just an act, before deciding to go surfing at the nearby beach.

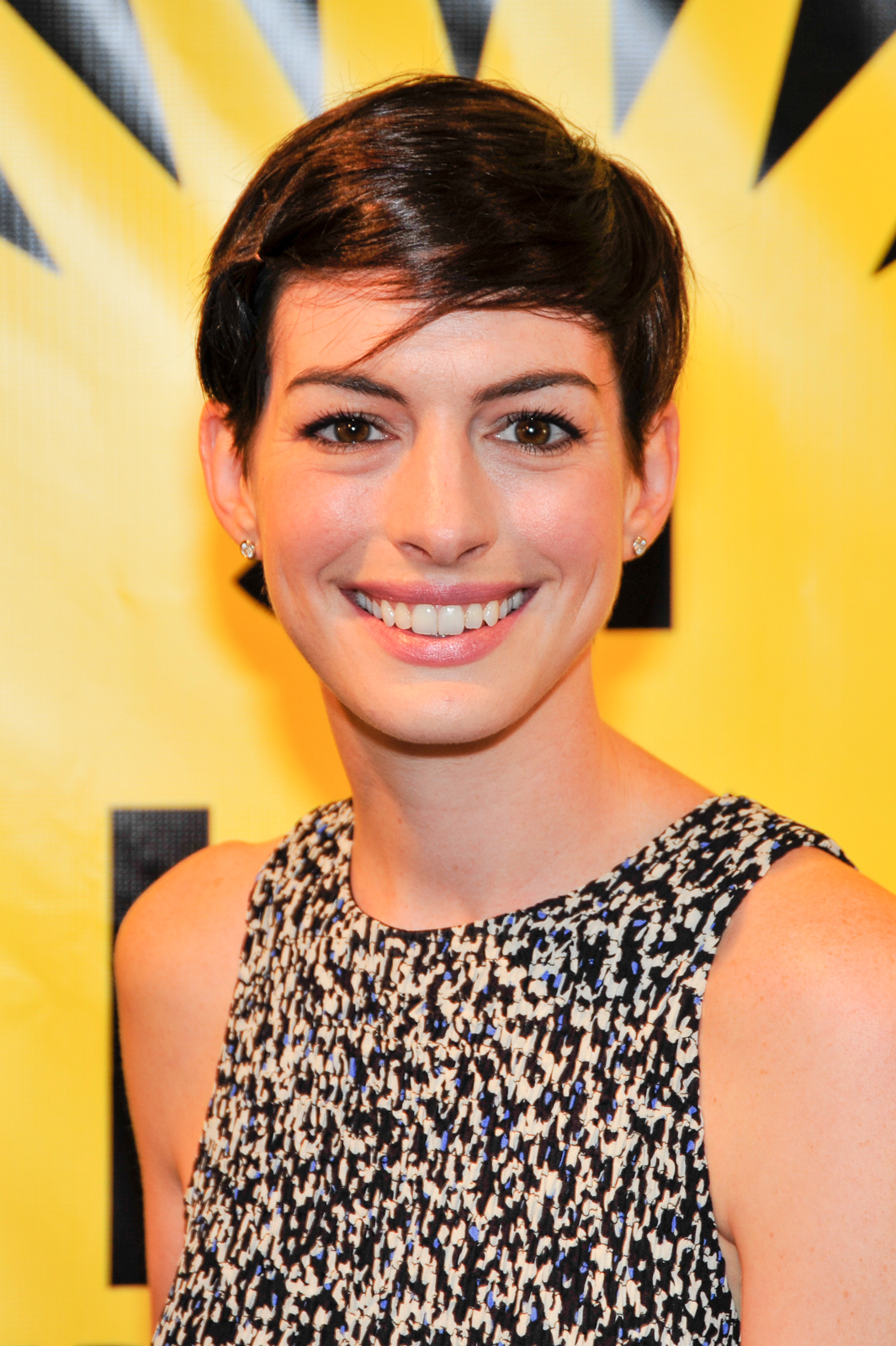
Anne Hathaway portrayed herself in the episode

In mentioning that he has been summoned for jury duty, and implying its exclusivity, Peter is confronted by Brian who reveals that the only reason he was selected was because he had voted in the last election. Peter goes on to state that he actually stuffed the ballot box at the Oscars, when the nominees included Grover from Sesame Street, Bluto from Popeye, and Daniel Day-Lewis, among others. Actress Anne Hathaway presented the award. Going on to find out that everyone is asked to do jury duty, Peter soon seeks to be kicked out, just as he was from the rock band Coldplay once he suggested that they write a song that is "not whiny bullcrap". Further attempting to be kicked out of jury duty, Peter begins singing the song "Surfin' Bird" by The Trashmen, a song that was first introduced in the series in the seventh season episode "I Dream of Jesus".

Before Peter is preparing to leave for jury duty, the family is seen watching a television sitcom entitled How Henry Kissinger Met Your Mother, a parody of the CBS sitcom How I Met Your Mother, which features Henry Kissinger, whose heavy accent makes his speech unintelligible. Once Peter is dressed for court, he explains that even the vending machines at the courthouse are out of order, with Brian then being shown dressed and laughing in a similar manner as the Hanna-Barbera cartoon character Muttley.

Having learned of the impending doomsday, Mayor Adam West angrily writes an angry letter to outer space, expressing his intention of punching the constellation Orion. West then straps on a jetpack, as well as a fishbowl for his helmet, and flies into space, punching the constellation, causing the stars to form into the Orion Pictures company logo, causing West to claim "all you are is a failed production company". After it is revealed by Channel 5 News that the impending doomsday was actually an April Fools' Day prank, Brian reacts by angrily yelling, "You dicks!", a line uttered by Jeff Spicoli, as portrayed by Sean Penn, in the 1982 comedy film Fast Times at Ridgemont High. Unable to win over his children's affection, Peter decides to buy them an Xbox 360 to earn the respect once more. Before the end credits, Peter is then shown playing the Xbox 360 game Call of Duty: Modern Warfare 2 (Team Deathmatch on Favela), much to his children's chagrin. Peter, gamertag 'pgriffin69x', is killed by Infinity Ward's former Creative Strategist Robert Bowling, gamertag FOURZEROTWO.

== Reception ==
In a slight decrease from the previous week, the episode was viewed in 6.93 million homes in its original airing, according to Nielsen ratings. The episode also acquired a 3.4 rating in the 18–49 demographic, beating The Simpsons and The Cleveland Show, as well as the return episode of American Dad!, which had been put into a temporary hiatus, in order to accommodate Sons of Tucson. In addition, the episode significantly edged out all three shows in total viewership.

Reviews of the episode were mostly mixed, calling it a "tragedy," but "funnier than [...] expected." Emily VanDerWerff of The A.V. Club noted that there are "funny lines tucked around the edges of every episode [...] but there's nothing here that justifies the needlessly elaborate plots." Jason Hughes of TV Squad gave the episode a more positive review, stating that Peter's attempts to bond with his children "brought some of the most hilarious visuals." Ramsey Isler of IGN gave the episode a much more negative review, noting that it did not "have many redeeming qualities," and the jokes were "mediocre." In a subsequent review of Family Guy's eighth season, Isler listed "April in Quahog" as being "full of the lowest of the lowest-common-denominator 'jokes', with heavy reliance on toilet humor and the characteristic cutaway gags that have steadily gotten more random and less funny."
