= Television Watch =

- Founded: May 2005
- Founder: Jim Dyke
- Purpose: Opposition to increased government regulation of television broadcasting
- Location: Charleston, South Carolina
- Key people: Jim Dyke

Television Watch is an American non-profit, non-partisan organization based in Charleston, South Carolina. The organization was established in May 2005 in response to the perceived increase in government regulation of television content. As an alternative to increased government control of the public airwaves, Television Watch promotes parental responsibility as the right way to protect children from inappropriate content on television.

== Leadership ==
Its executive director is Jim Dyke, an experienced communications and political advisor who served as communications director for the Republican National Convention in 2004. Dyke graduated from the University of Arkansas with a degree in history. Presently, Dyke resides in Charleston, South Carolina, with his wife Dawn and daughter Emily. Dyke's favorite television programs include Arrested Development, Grey's Anatomy, and Desperate Housewives.

Dyke has appeared in numerous news programs on TV and radio, including The Early Show, Hannity and Colmes, Live with Lester Holt, and Wolf Blitzer Reports.

Organizations supporting TV Watch include the Center for Creative Voices in Media, American Conservative Union, National Academy of Recording Arts and Sciences, and the United States Chamber of Commerce. The TV networks CBS, Fox, and NBC also back TV Watch.

== Mission ==
To promote their goal, the website of the organization keeps the public updated with news related to the Federal Communications Commission's (FCC) regulation of broadcast television, as well as reports supporting such action. In their reports, Television Watch reveals the flawed logic in claims that the FCC should place tougher regulation on the broadcast airwaves, as the majority of American television-viewing households do not have a child at home, and therefore should not be subject to governmental censorship influenced by special-interest groups representing the minority of the television-watching audiences - families with children, which TV Watch has revealed represent only one-third of television-watching households in the United States. TV Watch research has consistently proven that most parents believe it is of their own responsibility, not of the government, to determine what is appropriate for their family. As a challenge to the PTC's claims that the V-chip is unworkable, TV Watch held a "parental control challenge", a V-chip setting contest to test if the device would block all or the majority of programs deemed inappropriate for children.

The Parents Television Council, a media watchdog group noted for filing the majority of FCC complaints for controversial programs like the Super Bowl XXXVIII halftime show that featured the brief exposure of one of Janet Jackson's breasts, is a frequent target of criticism by the group for inaccurate reporting on the media, support of increased government regulation of television, and using "sensationalism" in their reporting to reinforce their views. TV Watch has also objected to the PTC's annual list of the "Best and Worst Shows for Primetime Viewing". In June 2007, the organization released an in-depth survey that concluded that most parents take their own responsibility for their children's TV viewing, thus challenging the PTC's views that most parents want increased government regulation of TV.

In addition, its home page contains a photograph of parents watching a certain show inappropriate for their children, with the children looking away from the television screen, which shows characters from the program as well as the caricature of Uncle Sam covering the screen. The screen changes when the user "refreshes" the display on the Web browser. Examples of characters used on the TV Watch homepage to illustrate government censorship of television have included Jack McCoy, Ed Green, and Nina Cassidy of Law & Order, Homer Simpson and the Simpson family of The Simpsons, Jack Bauer and Bill Buchanan of 24, and American Idol winner Taylor Hicks.

== Reception ==
Many parents and figures in the broadcast industry have expressed their support for TV Watch and its cause. Jeff Jarvis, former critic for TV Guide and creator of Entertainment Weekly, has asserted that although "Organizations like the Parents Television Council and the American Family Association come along and act like they're speaking for all parents," he believes, "as an American parent, they're not."

The organization, however, has been criticized by Parents Television Council founder L. Brent Bozell III, who called TV Watch "a collection of random citizen and public policy groups that have simply been hired and paid for by the networks to do their dirty work", going in defense of the PTC. When Bozell in September 2006 announced that he would resign from his position as PTC president, Jim Dyke of TV Watch stated that he believed "that the members of PTC and TV Watch do share some important common ground."

== See also ==
- Censorship in the United States
- Parents Television Council
