= Andrea Fay Friedman =

American film and television actress (1970–2023)

- Friedman as Katie in Law & Order: Special Victims Unit
- Born: June 1, 1970; Santa Monica, California, U.S.
- Died: December 3, 2023 (aged 53); Santa Monica, California, U.S.
- Other name: Andrea F. Friedman
- Education: West Los Angeles Baptist High School; Santa Monica College
- Occupations: Actress, public speaker
- Years active: 1991–2019

Andrea Fay Friedman (June 1, 1970 – December 3, 2023) was an American actress.

== Early life ==
Friedman was born in Santa Monica, California, in 1970. She attended West Los Angeles Baptist High School and Santa Monica College. In 1992, she portrayed Amanda, the girlfriend (and later wife) of the character Charles "Corky" Thacher, on the TV show Life Goes On for two seasons. In 1993, she appeared in an episode of Baywatch, in which Mary Lou Retton organizes a Special Olympics-like event. She starred in the 1997 film Smudge as Cindy, a girl in a group home for people with disabilities who attempts to hide her puppy, Smudge. The film won the 1998 Humanitas Prize in the Children's Live Action category.

== Career ==
Friedman voiced Ellen, a character with Down syndrome, in the Family Guy episode "Extra Large Medium", her first role as a voice actress. In the episode, Friedman's character stated "My dad's an accountant and my mom is the former Governor of Alaska", referencing Sarah Palin, who has a son, Trig, who has Down syndrome. However, per Friedman, "Sarah Palin said that was insensitive and cruel" and Friedman felt "it was only a joke". In an email concerning Palin's criticism of the episode, she said, "I guess former Governor Palin does not have a sense of humor." She concluded, "In my family we think laughing is good. My parents raised me to have a sense of humor and to live a normal life."

Friedman also had guest-starring roles in episodes of Law and Order: SVU, "Competence", playing a pregnant young woman named Katie, and Walker, Texas Ranger, "Special Witness", where she played a young woman in the Special Olympics who witnessed Trent Malloy being stabbed.

Friedman's final role was in the film Carol of the Bells (2019).

== Personal life and death ==
Friedman had Down syndrome. A 48-minute documentary about her life, A Possible Dream: The Andrea Friedman Story, with narration by Joanne Woodward, premiered in 2009. As of 2010, Friedman had been working at a law firm, in the accounting department, for 20 years. She also occasionally worked as an assistant teacher for the Pathway program of the University of California, Los Angeles, where she helped teach students how to live independently. She travelled to India and Japan, and spoke some Japanese. She also enjoyed bowling and skiing.

Friedman died of complications from Alzheimer's disease at her home in Santa Monica on December 3, 2023, aged 53.
