= Parents Television and Media Council =

Non-profit advocacy group in the United States

- Abbreviation: PTMC
- Formation: 1995; 31 years ago
- Founder: L. Brent Bozell III
- Defunct: October 3, 2025; 13 months ago
- Type: Advocacy group
- Headquarters: Alexandria, Virginia and Los Angeles, California
- Location: United States
- Method: Media attention, direct-appeal campaigns
- Members: 12,000 (disputed)
- President: Jon Yasuda
- President emeritus: Tim Winter
- Website: parentstv.org at the Wayback Machine (archived 31 October 2025)
- Formerly called: Parents Television Council (1995-2021)

The Parents Television and Media Council (PTMC), formerly the Parents Television Council (PTC), was an American media advocacy group that advocated for what it considers to be responsible, family-friendly content across all media platforms, and for advertisers to be held accountable for the content of television programs that they sponsor. The PTMC officially described itself as non-partisan.

The PTMC producex reviews, research reports, and online newsletters that highlight television programs and other entertainment products (such as music videos and video games) based on their suitability for family viewing. The PTMC advocated for cable television networks to be subject to the same decency rules as broadcast television, and for television providers to allow subscribers to purchase channels on an individual basis. The group was also critical of the TV Parental Guidelines system, often deeming the ratings given by broadcasters to be inaccurate in comparison to their own assessments of a program's content.

It mounted pressure campaigns against the producers, broadcasters, and sponsors of programming that they perceived to be indecent or harmful to children (such as those containing undue sexual content, profane language, and violence); these campaigns typically included the organized mass mailing of form letters and emails to advertising sponsors of unapproved programs, organized mass filing of complaints via the Federal Communications Commission (FCC) website complaint form, and direct threats of long, potentially costly FCC license challenges to local network affiliates planning to broadcast what the council considered harmful network programming.

Throughout its existence, the Parents Television and Media Council had been accused of promoting censorship. In 2004, the FCC reported that the group was the primary source of most content complaints received by the commission. Beginning around 2008, donations to the organization declined, forcing job cuts. In 2025, the PTMC filed for bankruptcy.

== History ==
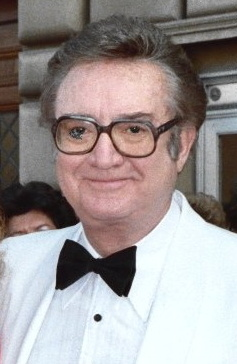
Steve Allen, former host of The Tonight Show, was PTC's honorary chairman and a member of its advisory board.

In 1989, the Media Research Center (MRC) began monitoring the entertainment industry for alleged liberal bias through its Entertainment Division and newsletter TV, etc. MRC founder and president L. Brent Bozell III later felt that "decency" was declining on most prime-time television programming. The PTC began operations in 1995 following private planning meetings with Charlton Heston, Michael Medved, and others in the entertainment industry, who would eventually make up the advisory board of the PTC. After the release of its first annual Family Guide to Prime-Time Television following the 1995–1996 television season, the PTC hoped to hold the entertainment industry accountable for the indecency that it perceived to be prominent on prime-time television. By 1996, the organization had the support of several members of the U.S. Congress, including Joe Lieberman and Lamar S. Smith, and an estimated annual budget of $142,000.

By 1998, with an estimated membership of 120,000, comedian and former The Tonight Show host Steve Allen joined PTC as its Honorary Chairman, and PTC released a report questioning the accuracy of the TV Parental Guidelines ratings system and campaigning for advertisers to stop sponsoring programs that the PTC claimed were offensive. Allen launched a newspaper advertisement campaign promoting the PTC, which was published in many outlets including The New York Times. The PTC was noted for criticizing such shows as Ally McBeal, Dawson's Creek, Ellen, Friends, and Spin City. Its website was also introduced that year, and its annual budget had already surpassed $1 million. PTC rolled out another round of full-page newspaper advertisements in 1999; San Francisco Examiner television columnist Tim Goodman perceived Allen and the PTC of advocating complete censorship of television to allow only what PTC considered "Family-Safe TV".

The PTC lost nearly $1 million in 2008 and in 2009 received $2.9 million in revenue, a 29% drop from the previous year. In 2009 and 2010, the PTC cut its staff by 38 percent to save money.

On April 14, 2021, the organization changed its name to the Parents Television and Media Council "to better reflect its mission to advocate for responsible entertainment on all entertainment media platforms".

In 2023, the PTMC received about $1.6 million in donations, compared to $4.7 million in 2007.

On October 3, 2025, the PTMC filed for Chapter 7 bankruptcy in the U.S. bankruptcy court for the District of Delaware. The Los Angeles Times commented: "The group’s demise reflects broad cultural changes, including a fractured media environment and consumers’ shift to streaming and social media apps such as TikTok for entertainment."

== Leadership ==
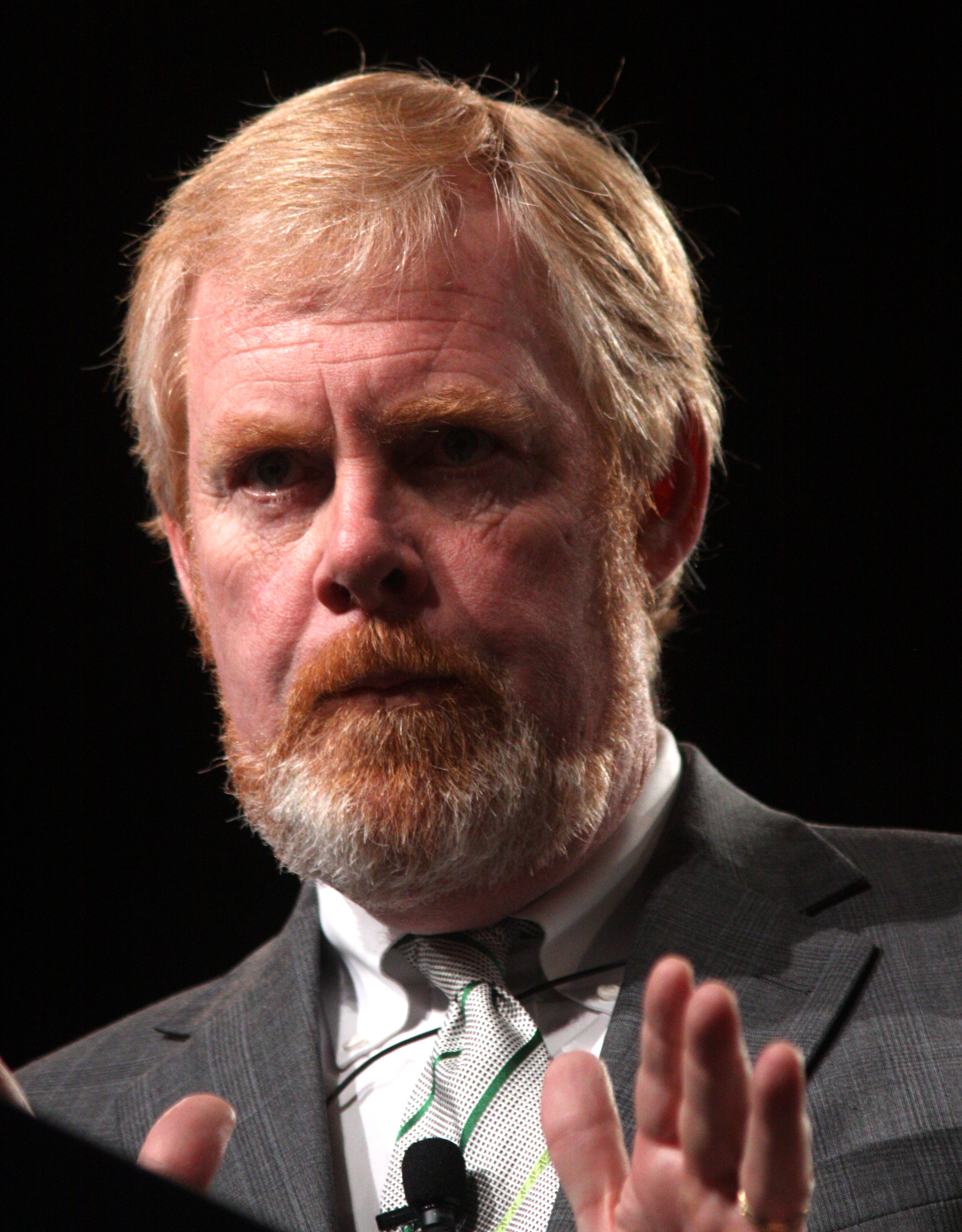
L. Brent Bozell III the founder of the organization

PTC was founded in 1995 by longtime political activist L. Brent Bozell III. Bozell is a prominent conservative activist who has, among other things, served as executive director of the Conservative Victory Committee, a political action committee that has supported the election of dozens of conservative candidates. He was also National Finance Chairman for Pat Buchanan's 1992 presidential campaign, and later president of the National Conservative Political Action Committee. Bozell was succeeded as PTC President by Timothy F. Winter. Winter served as executive director of the PTC for three years prior to becoming president. Prior to joining the PTC, Mr. Winter's 20-year career as a media executive included positions with Metro-Goldwyn-Mayer (MGM) and NBC. Until 2015 when his position was terminated, Dan Isett, Director of Corporate and Government Affairs of the PTC, represented the PTC on the Consumer Advisory Committee of the Federal Communications Commission (FCC).

== Advisory board ==
The PTC also has an advisory board consisting of politicians and entertainers working to assist the council in their goal of protecting children against profanity and violence in the media. Notable members of the advisory board have included singer Pat Boone, former football player Mel Renfro, writer-producer Coleman Luck, country musician Billy Ray Cyrus, comedian and actor Tim Conway of CBS's The Carol Burnett Show, former U.S. Senator from Kansas and 2008 presidential candidate Sam Brownback, film critic Michael Medved, star of 1980s soap opera Dallas Susan Howard, and ION Television producer Gary Johnson. In addition, the PTC has established numerous local chapters for most American media markets. Notable former advisory board members include - both of whom are now deceased - comedian Steve Allen, original host of NBC's The Tonight Show, and C. Delores Tucker, participant in the Civil Rights Movement and activist against gangsta rap music; Allen is now given the title of National Honorary Chairman-Emeritus. Bahçeşehir University associate professor Christian Christiansen questioned the backgrounds of certain PTC advisory board members as not consistent with their stance on morality.

== Publications ==
=== Columns and reports ===
The website of the PTC features reports on what the group says is harmful content on television and regular writings from its staff. Their research is done with the support of their Entertainment Tracking System, an archive of prime-time television programming that they claim is the largest in the world. Such publications include:

- "Culture Watch" – Throughout 2005 and 2006, the PTC published columns under this series authored by Christopher Gildemeister, covering the influence on American culture by entertainment as well as exposing the increase in sex, violence, and profanity in cable television and the methods used by advertisers and broadcasting companies to attract young audiences. In a December 2005 column of his, Advertising Age columnist Simon Dumenco criticized the PTC, arguing that the PTC is "very very afraid of gay TV characters". Gildemeister defended the PTC as being "not homophobic" but simply opposed to "sexual references or innuendo (of any variety, hetero, homo or other) aired where children might be exposed to them."
- "Parenting and the Media" authored by Rod Gustafson, where he offers advice on parenting children who frequent the media.
- "TV Trends" – Another column by Christopher Gildemeister, published since October 2007 intending to inform parents and TV viewers in general about what he determines to be "harmful or questionable prime-time programming." Hartford Courant television critic Roger Catlin quoted Gildemeister as criticizing ABC for having an "apparent fetish for transsexuals" in certain programs.
- Former president Bozell's weekly entertainment column, which it links to within the home page

In 2000, PTC's report What a Difference a Decade Makes allegedly stated that there was an increase in profanity, sex, and violence on television during the 1990s. The report also claimed that references to homosexuality increased the most during that decade – by a factor of 24. In 2002, the PTC released a report claiming that there was an increase in profanity on network programming shown during the first hour of prime time. In a 2006 report titled Wolves in Sheep's Clothing, analyst Kristen Fyfe reported an increase in violent, profane, and sexual content in children's programming. Among its results, based on research during summer 2005, the PTC stated that Teen Titans was the most violent program, and claimed Cartoon Network had the most violent incidents. Richard Huff of the New York Daily News criticized the report for misinterpreting an episode of SpongeBob SquarePants, "Sailor Mouth", over its intent to satirize profanity implicitly.

Following the 2005–06 television season, PTC issued a report Faith in a Box that analyzed depictions of religion in primetime television. The study stated that most positive references to religion were on reality shows such as Extreme Makeover: Home Edition, while claiming that scripted shows tended to be more negative towards it. The report also ranked Fox as the "most anti-religious network", followed by NBC, UPN, ABC, CBS, and the WB. In 2008, PTC published a report titled Happily Never After, using analysis of several primetime shows early in the 2007-2008 television season that asserted that extramarital sex was more favored on television shows during that time period. Ian O'Doherty of The Irish Independent asked regarding the PTC's marriage depiction study: "After all, would you rather watch people having fun or would you rather watch a realistic depiction of marriage, which ... would simply be an hour of two people sullenly chewing their food, pausing occasionally only to throw each other filthies and occasionally grumbling under their breath how the biggest regret of their life was ever setting eyes on you and that their mother was right all along?" PTC released a report in October 2009 stating that prime-time television shows on broadcast networks had twice as many depictions of violence against women in 2009 than in 2004.

In November 2010, the PTC released a study, Habitat for Profanity: Broadcast TV's Sharp Increase in Foul Language, which claims that there was a sharp rise in the usage of profanity between 2005 and 2010—during the 8 pm to 9 pm ET/PT time period commonly referred to them as the Family Viewing Hour, the PTC claimed that there were 111 instances of profanity during this hour in 2010 versus 10 in 2005; during all of prime time, 276 instances in 2010 against 11 in 2005. The study claimed that there was a 69.3% increase in prime time in general between 2005 and 2010, with the Fox network being heavily accused of bringing a 269% increase for the network during that period. The study also claimed instances in which there was profanity, but the offending word was bleeped out.

=== Entertainment reviews and analysis ===
The PTC's activities extend to evaluation, rating, and educating around broadcast TV programs according to a traffic light system across three categories of sex, violence and profanity, accumulating to an overall rating based on the ratings of these three categories. The guide has been in use since the 1995–96 season using the traffic light system. In the PTC's definition of its traffic light system, green light indicates that the program is "appropriate for all ages", a yellow light indicates that the program "would be unsuitable for children under the age of 14", and a red light indicates that the program is "appropriate for adult audiences only".

Every television season since 1995–96, the council has released a list of the best and worst prime-time television programs for family viewing. The PTC's website includes the guide from the 1996-97 season at the earliest. Starting with the 2005–2006 season, their list was based on their traffic light system as well as Nielsen Media Research ratings of viewership among children ages 2–17 of certain shows. Popular shows that have frequently been praised as the most family-friendly programs on television include George Lopez, 7th Heaven, Touched by an Angel, Home Improvement, Family Matters, Sabrina the Teenage Witch, Boy Meets World, Extreme Makeover: Home Edition, American Idol, Dancing with the Stars, NBC Sunday Night Football, Deal or No Deal, and Who Wants to Be a Millionaire. Popular shows frequently named "Worst of the Season" include American Dad!, CSI: Crime Scene Investigation, House, South Park, Two and a Half Men, Ally McBeal, Dawson's Creek, Grey's Anatomy, The Drew Carey Show, Family Guy, Friends, The O.C., Spin City, That '70s Show and Will and Grace.

On a weekly basis, the PTC publishes reviews of what they consider to be the best and worst television programming for family viewing, authored by the various entertainment analysts at the council. Seth MacFarlane, creator of Family Guy, compared the PTC's frequent negative reviews of the series to "hate mail from Hitler" and "They're literally terrible human beings. I've read their newsletter, I've visited their website, and they're just rotten to the core. For an organization that prides itself on 'Christian' values ... they spend their entire day hating people." MacFarlane became a target again when the PTC protested the Academy Awards' decision to have him host the 85th ceremony. "So You Think You Can Rate a TV Show?", the title being a play on the title of Fox television series So You Think You Can Dance, is a weekly column the PTC began in July 2007 to claim that networks inaccurately rate their shows based on the TV Parental Guidelines, whether the network applied the improper age-based rating (such as TV-PG or TV-14) or failed to include the proper content descriptors (such as "L" for language or "V" for violence).

=== Seal of Approval ===
To recognize excellence in the media, the Parents Television Council awards its Seal of Approval to television shows, movies, home products, and advertisers that provide or sponsor content it deems to be "family-friendly". It is divided into two categories: Entertainment and Advertiser. Popular television shows that have been awarded include 7th Heaven, American Idol, Extreme Makeover: Home Edition, Everybody Loves Raymond, George Lopez, JAG, Reba, Smallville, Touched by an Angel, The West Wing, The Wonderful World of Disney, and most recently, When Calls the Heart. Also receiving the Entertainment Seal of Approval are TiVo's KidZone television filtering service, The Jimmy Wilson Films Children's Adventure Series, the Sky Angel Christian television service, and the CleanFlicks DVD filtering product.

== Activism ==
=== Broadcast indecency ===
In 2003, the PTC unsuccessfully campaigned for the FCC to take action against the NBC television network in response to the use of the word "fucking" by Bono, lead singer for the rock band U2, during NBC's January 2003 telecast of the Golden Globe Awards. Among an audience of nearly 20 million, the FCC received only 234 complaints, 217 of which came from the PTC. In October 2003, the FCC decided not to fine NBC because Bono's obscenity was ruled as fleeting and not describing sexual or excretory functions, the FCC's standard for fining a network for indecency. After the PTC filed an Application for Review to the FCC, in March 2004 the FCC decided that the word was indecent by law but still decided not to fine NBC; however, the ruling was to serve as a warning to networks that there would be a "zero tolerance" policy towards obscene language willfully used during the daytime. However, the PTC's complaints about profanity used by presenter Nicole Richie in the December 10, 2003, broadcast of the Billboard Music Awards led the FCC to conclude that the language violated decency law.

The PTC began attracting more attention after it filed around 65,000 complaints to the FCC about the Super Bowl XXXVIII halftime show, in which one of performer Janet Jackson's nipple shielded breasts, was exposed for 9/16ths of a second. FCC chairman Michael Powell stated that the number of indecency complaints to the FCC had risen from 350 in the years 2000 and 2001, to 14,000 in 2002 and 240,000 in 2003. It was also found that the PTC had generated most of the indecency complaints received by the FCC. In July 2008, the United States Court of Appeals for the Third Circuit voided the fine.

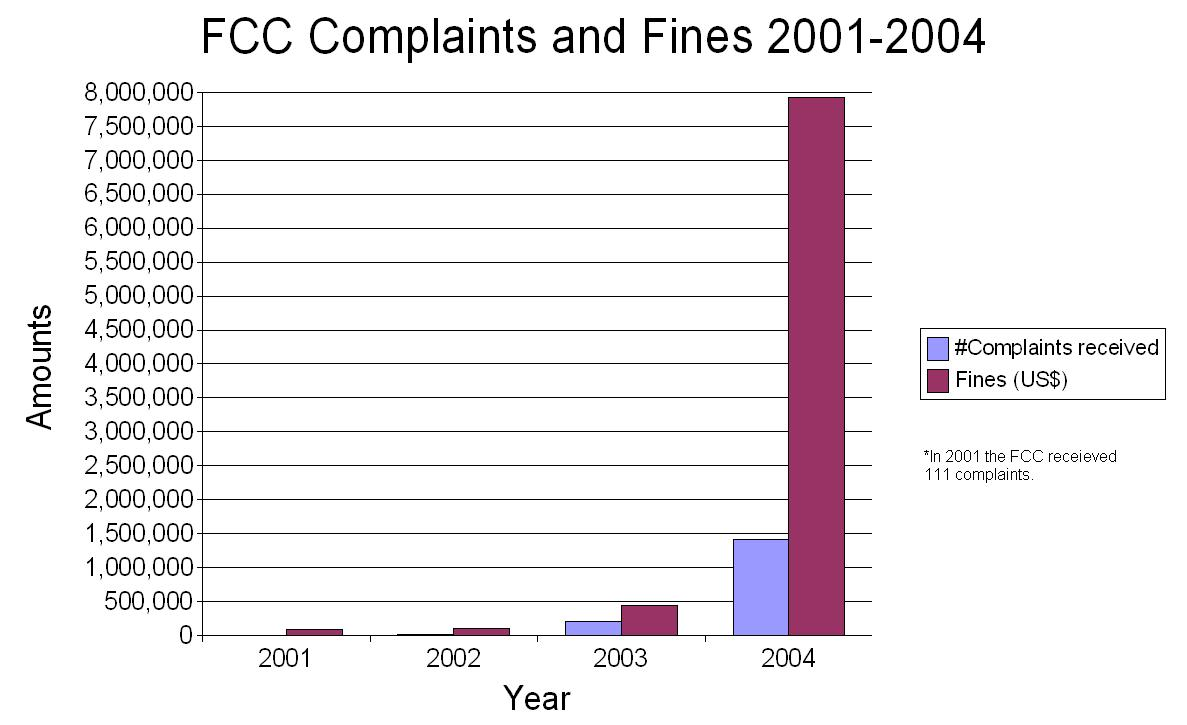
PTC campaigns led to a great increase in FCC-issued fines and received complaints compared to those from previous years.

After the halftime show, the PTC launched five more FCC complaint drives, starting March 2004 with an episode of Fox's That '70s Show titled "Happy Jack", which revolved around character Eric Forman being caught masturbating. The beginning of the 2004–2005 television season sparked four new campaigns, the first being against NBC's animated series Father of the Pride, stating that it contained a "barrage of sexual innuendo and profanity" while being promoted "from the creators of Shrek", which they felt would potentially attract children to watching the series. That campaign led to over 11,000 email complaints to the FCC. Later, shortly after CBS broadcast the word "fuck" during an airing of Big Brother 5, the PTC took action again, this time claiming that CBS ignored a warning from the Federal Communications Commission (FCC) that there would be zero tolerance toward unbleeped profanity. However, those complaints became moot when Viacom, then-owners of CBS, settled with the FCC for $3.5 million regarding all allegedly indecent programming broadcast in the years around 2003 and 2004, including the Big Brother 5 episode in question. In March 2006, the FCC ruled that Father of the Pride was not indecent. Following were complaints about an October 2004 episode of ABC's short-lived teen drama Life As We Know It, which the PTC felt was sexually charged.

The PTC started off 2005 with their campaign against the Without a Trace episode "Our Sons and Daughters", leading to CBS being fined for indecency in March 2006; the PTC objected to the depiction of teenagers participating in an orgy in that episode. CBS argued that the episode "featured an important and socially relevant storyline warning parents to exercise greater supervision of their teenagers." The FCC fined CBS $3.63 million in March 2006 for this episode, but after a court settlement, the network agreed to pay $300,000 in fines. At the end of January 2005, the FCC rejected a set of complaints that PTC filed between October 2001 and February 2004 for allegedly indecent programs such as NBC's Friends, the WB's Gilmore Girls, and Fox's The Simpsons. The FCC received complaints from the PTC in the summer over an unedited broadcast of the lyric "who the fuck are you?" in The Who's song "Who Are You" from the Live 8 concert broadcast July 2, 2005, on ABC stations on the East Coast.

In 2006, PTC requested that the FCC deny broadcast license renewal for Salt Lake City CBS station KUTV because they felt that the broadcast of the Without a Trace episode that was ruled indecent violated community standards and that CBS failed to take action to reduce indecent content following the FCC fines. Subsequently, CBS agreed to pay the FCC $300,000 to settle the KUTV license challenge. Starting from December 2007, the organization demanded that CBS cancel its plan to rebroadcast an edited version of the Showtime drama Dexter, whose title character was a serial killer and police forensics analyst, because it felt that the program would glorify murder even with the edits. By early February 2008, the Council claimed to have collected 17,000 complaints to CBS.

On January 25, 2008, the FCC proposed an estimated $1.4 million fine against ABC for a scene of female nudity in the NYPD Blue episode "Nude Awakening" aired on February 25, 2003. Because the episode aired outside the indecency "safe harbor" in the Central and Mountain Time Zones, the fine applied only to ABC stations in those zones. The PTC praised the FCC's action. However, PTC president Winter condemned ABC's decision to appeal the fine in federal court. PTC has also criticized the Third Circuit Court of Appeals' decision to void the FCC's fine for the Super Bowl XXXVIII halftime show. TV series that the PTC has targeted for FCC complaints in 2008 have included NBC's Today morning show and CBS primetime programs Big Brother 10, Survivor: Gabon, and Two and a Half Men. Profanity was the main concern for Today and Big Brother 10, the extremely brief exposure of contestant Marcus Lehman's penis for Survivor: Gabon, and a "lap-dance" scene for Two and a Half Men. The PTC's first complaint in 2009 was over sexual content in an episode of Family Guy titled "Family Gay". Later in 2009, the PTC urged affiliates of The CW to pre-empt a Gossip Girl episode to be aired November 9; the episode would reportedly contain a threesome scene. In response to Adam Lambert's performance of his song "For Your Entertainment" at the end of the 2009 American Music Awards broadcast on ABC, PTC urged viewers to complain to the FCC if living in an area where the performance was shown before 10 p.m. local time. PTC complained that the performance contained a simulation of oral sex. Lambert's performance reportedly was broadcast around 11 p.m. Eastern and Pacific time, "outside the FCC's usual 6am-10pm time frame prohibiting the broadcast of indecent material". ABC also received about 1,500 telephoned complaints.

In January 2010, the PTC launched a complaint campaign after the American Dad! episode "Don't Look a Smith Horse in the Mouth" aired in January 2010. The FCC fined Fox $25,000 on June 4, stating that they failed to respond to an inquiry of 100,000 complaints about the episode. A month later, Fox slammed the decision, claiming that it was "unconstitutional".

On May 20, 2010, the PTC announced that it plans to target CBS and its affiliates after the network announced that the new sitcom $#*! My Dad Says was added to the 2010-2011 fall TV lineup. The PTC cites both the show's title and its Thursday 8:30 pm timeslot as reasons. The series is based on the popular Twitter account created by Justin Halpern, who also served as one of the co-producers on the show. CBS defended its decision and said that it was working with the account's creator and its content was toned down for the program before the series premiere in September.

On October 20, PTC criticized GQ magazine for featuring three Glee stars posing in risque outfits; the PTC statement said that the photoshoot "borders on pedophilia."

In January 2011, the PTC called on the United States Department of Justice and the Judiciary Committees of both houses of Congress to investigate whether MTV violated child pornography laws in casting teenaged actors in Skins, a remake of the British TV series of the same name. MTV rated Skins "TV-MA", meaning the show is not suitable for audiences under 17. The Los Angeles Times responded in an editorial: "...looking for government remedies is ineffective and unwise; we suspect the network's editors are smart enough to skirt prosecution. The Federal Communications Commission doesn't regulate the content of cable networks, and even if it did, a crackdown on shows like "Skins" would be a bad idea, because adults should be able to watch whatever they like on cable and federal attempts to protect kids from adult programming have never been successful."

In August 2020, the PTC requested that Netflix remove the film Cuties from its streaming service.

=== Advertising ===
In May 2005, Carl's Jr. introduced its "Spicy BBQ Six Dollar Burger" in a television advertisement featuring celebrity Paris Hilton in a swimsuit, soaping up a Bentley Arnage while leaning on it, and then eating the burger. A similar ad with Hilton for Hardee's hamburger chain was aired in June 2005. The Parents Television Council and other media watchdog groups criticized the commercial for being shown during programs that were very likely to be watched by children. Melissa Caldwell, PTC research director, said, "This commercial is basically soft-core porn. The way she moves, the way she puts her finger in her mouth—it's very suggestive and very titillating." The group mobilized more than one million members to contact the restaurant chain and voice their concern and claimed that "[i]f this television commercial were to go unchallenged it would set a new standard for acceptable television commercial content." Caldwell, then-president Bozell, and then-executive director Winter appeared on various news programs such as Good Morning America, Today, The Early Show, American Morning, and The O'Reilly Factor to discuss this issue. Andy Puzder, CEO of Carl's Jr., says the group needs to "get a life ... This isn't Janet Jackson—there is no nipple shield in this," referring to the Super Bowl XXXVIII halftime-show controversy. He continued, "There is no nudity, there is no sex act — it's a beautiful model in a swimsuit washing a car." In addition to featuring the ad on their web site, Carl's Jr. also set up another website playing a longer version of the commercial.

PTC accused television commercials for Hardee's "biscuit holes" food product of suggesting double entendres. The commercial featured consumers suggesting "A-holes" and "B-holes" as nicknames for the biscuit holes. Boddie-Noell Enterprises, which owned 350 Hardee's restaurants in four states, refused to show the ads in its respective markets. Ben Mayo Boddie, chairman of Boddie-Noell, wrote a letter to the PTC condemning the ads as well.

=== World Wrestling Federation campaign and lawsuit ===
In 1999, the PTC launched a campaign against the World Wrestling Federation (WWF), now World Wrestling Entertainment (WWE), complaining that their SmackDown! program contained levels of sexuality and violence unbecoming prime time programming. In the campaign, Bozell said that four children had been killed by peers emulating professional wrestling moves learned from the program. With these allegations, Bozell and various PTC members began meeting with representatives of the advertising departments of various companies that advertised on SmackDown! to persuade them to withdraw sponsorship. The PTC also suggested that between 30 and 40 advertisers had pulled their commercials from WWF programming, an assertion that was not true.

On November 9, 2000, the WWF filed a lawsuit against the PTC in the U.S. District Court for the Southern District of New York, claiming that the PTC's statements were false and constituted defamation. The WWF also filed a copyright infringement lawsuit against the PTC for using clips from WWF programs in their promotional videos. The PTC filed for dismissal of the suit, but on May 24, 2001, U.S. district court Judge Denny Chin denied the PTC's motion on the basis that the WWF's lawsuit had merit. The PTC and the WWF settled out of court and, as part of the settlement agreement, the PTC paid the WWF $3.5 million USD and Bozell issued a public apology, stating that it was wrong to blame the World Wrestling Federation or any of its programs for the deaths of children and that the original statements had been based on what was later found to be false information designed by people close to the Lionel Tate case to blame the death of Tiffany Eunick on the WWF.

The PTC would be satirized in WWF programming by The Right to Censor, a group of heels led by Steven Richards who objected to rowdy, risqué, and "hardcore" activities.

=== In-flight entertainment ===
In September 2007, the PTC launched a campaign to get airlines in America to reduce the number of "PG-13" and "R"-rated films shown as in-flight entertainment. Consequently, Heath Shuler, Democratic representative of North Carolina, introduced the Family Friendly Flights Act of 2007 bill to require airlines to set aside "child-safe" viewing areas for families to sit in planes. The bill never became law.

=== YouTube ===
Twice has the PTC targeted video-hosting website YouTube in its campaigns and statements. PTC called for NBC to reconsider uploading the uncensored clip of the Saturday Night Live novelty song "Dick in a Box" on NBC's site and YouTube channel. In 2008, the PTC released a report The "New" Tube: A Content Analysis of YouTube—the Most Popular Online Video Destination, which praised YouTube for filtering adult content but criticized the site for not filtering profanity and other explicit content from comments sections or videos.

=== Ethics controversy ===
In October 2010, The New York Times reported that former PTC vice president of development Patrick W. Salazar had accused PTC of mishandling hundreds of thousands of mailings to donors and members. Based on Internal Revenue Service filings, the American Institute of Philanthropy rated PTC "C+" on financial efficiency. Salazar also disputed the PTC's official membership figure of 1.3 million and estimated that at most 12,000 people respond to annual fundraisers. Although Salazar stated that he left the PTC in November 2009, the PTC said that it fired Salazar and that Salazar was trying to extort money from the organization.

=== Other ===
The PTC also criticized The Muppets for not meeting "family viewing" guidelines and suggested a boycott, based on the mockumentary format of the series including mentions of plastic surgery, "inside" business language being used in a crude manner, and the Muppets in a bar consuming alcoholic beverages.

The PTC also criticized WE tv's Sex Box, deeming it "an affront to families, toxic to advertisers, and a clear demonstration of a badly-broken business model that forces every cable/satellite subscriber to pay for unwanted and unwatched cable networks."

== Viewpoints ==
On its website, PTC states that its mission is to "promote and restore responsibility and decency to the entertainment industry in answer to America's demand for positive, family-oriented television programming." The PTC believes that the entertainment industry—not only television but also music, movies, and video games as well—and its sponsors share responsibility with parents for children's television viewing habits. It therefore believes that television is harming children through a perceived "gratuitous" amount of sex, violence, and profanity. Its activism has influenced the removal of potentially objectionable content from certain shows, such as the fourth season of the popular CBS crime drama CSI: Crime Scene Investigation. Increased government regulation of broadcasting is another viewpoint supported by PTC. PTC considers itself nonpartisan; others have considered the PTC to be socially conservative. Robyn Blumner of the St. Petersburg Times called the PTC "the Gladys Kravitz of public advocacy" and believed the PTC supported a federal policy on broadcast decency she called "Big Nanny run amok".

=== TV Parental Guidelines ===
Since the introduction of the TV Parental Guidelines ratings system, the PTC has frequently accused the guidelines of having inaccuracy and low standards. In 1997, PTC was twice as likely to rate a show with the toughest rating classification, "red light" in the PTC's case, and "TV-14" in the Guidelines. Bill Berkowitz quoted PTC president Bozell as stating, based on PTC research, that "the current ratings system and V-chip are failures." In response to a V-Chip advertising campaign in the summer of 2006, Bozell proposed instead that cable companies either apply FCC-style broadcast television standards or offer choice in ordering channels. Television Watch considers PTC's reporting on the V-chip inaccurate and ideologically charged.

=== Cable choice ===
The PTC is an avid supporter of "a la carte" cable television services to allow families to choose only the cable television channels that are appropriate for their children, and also impose the same decency standards already in place on broadcast television on cable channels. Frequently, the council has criticized programs on BET, Comedy Central, E!, FX, MTV, Spike, TNT, and VH1 because they claim some of the content aired on those channels is inappropriate for younger viewers. On the other side of the issue, the PTC has awarded its "Seal of Approval" to cable networks Disney Channel and Hallmark Channel for their original programs several years ago.

On June 14, 2007, United States Representatives Dan Lipinski (Democratic, Illinois) and Jeff Fortenberry (Republican, Nebraska) introduced into legislation the Family and Consumer Choice Act of 2007, which intends to allow families to choose and pay for only the cable television channels that they want to watch. In September 2007, the PTC launched a new website, HowCableShouldBe.com, to allow cable customers to see how much they are paying for their monthly cable bill currently.

In August 2013, the PTC released a statement criticizing MTV for the airing of a performance by Miley Cyrus during its Video Music Awards and urged Congress to pass the Television Consumer Freedom Act.

== Popular music ==
In April 2008, PTC released The Rap on Rap, a study covering hip-hop and R&B music videos rotated on programs 106 & Park and Rap City, both shown on BET, and Sucker Free on MTV. PTC urged advertisers to withdraw sponsorship of those programs, whose videos PTC stated targeted children and teenagers "with adult content ... once every 38 seconds". PTC also warned radio stations about playing the Britney Spears song "If U Seek Amy" over concerns it contained an audible use of an obscenity. In response to the music video to Miley Cyrus' song "Who Owns My Heart", the PTC stated that it felt it was "unfortunate that she would participate in such a sexualized video like this one"; ironically, Miley Cyrus' father Billy Ray Cyrus sat on the PTC Advisory Board at the time.

In May 2011, the PTC took issue with Rihanna's music video for her song "Man Down." In the video Rihanna portrays a woman who resorts to killing the man who had previously raped her. They claimed the video promoted gun crime and murder, while the pop star said she wanted to be a voice to victims. After the video became the most viewed YouTube video that week, she sarcastically used Twitter to thank the PTC for helping her make the video such a success.

== Criticism ==
The PTMC has been frequently criticized for hypocrisy, slanted reporting and only criticizing shows that are aimed at adults. Critics of the PTMC have alleged that it supports increased governmental censorship of television by lobbying the FCC for indecency enforcement for certain television shows and inaccurately reporting on the V-Chip in order to further their agenda.

Family Guy creator Seth MacFarlane, who the PTMC frequently criticizes, said in The Advocate

Oh, yeah. That's like getting hate mail from Hitler. They're literally terrible human beings. I've read their newsletter, I've visited their website, and they're just rotten to the core. For an organization that prides itself on Christian values—I mean, I'm an atheist, so what do I know?—they spend their entire day hating people. They can all suck my dick as far as I'm concerned.

Kurt Sutter, creator of Sons of Anarchy responded to Bozell's article that attacked the season 6 premiere of his show due to it including a school shooting scene, calling the PTC "a hate club" and Bozell an "idiot" as well as "a pathetic fucking douchebag and I bet your own kids fucking hate you.”

In January 2005, Bahçeşehir University associate professor Christian Christiansen questioned the backgrounds of certain PTC Advisory Board members, contending they are not consistent with their stance on morality. Christiansen's observations were as follows: L. Brent Bozell III as 'National Finance Chairman for the 1992 "Buchanan for President" campaign' of "neo-fascist Pat Buchanan"; Susan Howard's portrayal of adulterous Donna Culver Krebbs on TV series Dallas, which series "was soaked in scantily-clad women, emotional cruelty, violence, alcoholism, and marital infidelity"; Coleman Luck as 'writer and producer' ... 'on Otherworld, The Equalizer, Gabriel's Fire, Matrix, and The Burning Zone [which] ... included a fair amount of death and violence'; William Bennett as "a popular guest at a number of Las Vegas casinos"; Bruce Jarchow appearing in "less family-friendly products... such as The Puppet Masters, Mad Dog and Glory and Married... with Children; Billy Ray Cyrus, who starred in Mulholland Drive made by filmmaker David Lynch; and John Carvelli, 'who, in 1987, "took part in a fact-finding mission in Nicaragua and Honduras with the National Conservative Foundation during the Nicaraguan civil war."'

In a December 2005 column of his, Advertising Age columnist Simon Dumenco claimed that the PTC is "very very afraid of gay TV characters". Culture Watch columnist Christopher Gildemeister defended the PTC as being "not homophobic" but simply opposed to "sexual references or innuendo (of any variety, hetero, homo or other) aired where children might be exposed to them."

== See also ==
- Anti-pornography movement
- Criticism of Family Guy
- Parents Music Resource Center
- "Think of the children"
