= The Fat Guy Strangler =

- Family Guy episode
- Episode no.: Season 4 Episode 17
- Directed by: Sarah Frost
- Written by: Chris Sheridan
- Production code: 4ACX20
- Original air date: November 27, 2005

Guest appearances
- Bob Barker as himself; Robert Downey Jr. as Patrick Pewterschmidt; Max Burkholder as Young Patrick Pewterschmidt; Dave Boat; Barclay DeVeau; Margaret Easley; Kim Parks; Will Sasso as Todd; Anne-Michelle Seiler; Tara Strong as Boy in "Ball-in-a-Cup" Commercial

Episode chronology
← Previous "The Courtship of Stewie’s Father"	Next → "The Father, the Son, and the Holy Fonz"
- Family Guy season 4

"The Fat Guy Strangler" is the 17th episode of the fourth season of the American animated television series Family Guy. It originally aired on the Fox network in the United States on November 27, 2005. In the episode, Lois discovers she has a long-lost brother, Patrick who was institutionalized after seeing his mother being seduced. Lois gets him released, but after a childhood flashback induced by Peter, Patrick becomes traumatized and starts murdering overweight people.

The episode was written by Chris Sheridan and directed by Sarah Frost, whilst guest stars were Bob Barker, Dave Boat, Max Burkholder, Barclay DeVeau, Robert Downey Jr., Margaret Easley, Kim Parks, Will Sasso, Anne-Michelle Seiler and Tara Strong.

== Plot ==
Instead of going to his physical, Peter goes out with Brian, Quagmire, Cleveland, and Joe to eat steaks. When Lois finds out, she takes him to the doctor herself. Dr. Hartman pronounces him healthy, but fat. Peter takes offense and accidentally smashes a picture of Lois' family. Trying to salvage it, Lois discovers another child in the picture: a boy. She telephones her father Carter, who tells her she does not have a brother and quickly terminates the call, but she persists. She breaks into her parents' house and learns that her brother, named Patrick, has been living in a mental hospital for decades, ever since he suffered a nervous breakdown as a young child, upon walking in on his mother having an affair with Jackie Gleason.

Meanwhile, Peter announces to the family that he is fat and decides to create the "National Association for the Advancement of Fat People" (NAAFP). Peter hosts the first meeting of the association, but it is unsuccessful due to those attending making too much noise, such as breathing heavily, passing gas, and munching junk food the entire way through.

Believing Patrick to be sane, Lois authorizes his release and arranges for Patrick to stay with the family. Patrick soon announces he has a wife, Marion, although she is imaginary. This leads Brian and Stewie to believe he is crazy. Lois attempts to overlook the behavior and instead tries to persuade Peter not to encourage people to be fat. Later Peter unintentionally frightens Patrick by dressing up like Ralph Kramden, who was played by Gleason, and repeatedly using one of Kramden's catchphrases, "Pow, right in the kisser!" This triggers Patrick to start killing fat people.

Lois' father, Carter, calls her and tells her how violent Patrick is, but she assures him Patrick is safe. However, she becomes worried after seeing on the news that a fat man has been murdered. Lois remains in denial as more murders against fat people are committed, even as Brian tries to convince her that Patrick is the killer.

Peter brings the fat men back to his home to protect them, but after learning from Brian that Patrick is the killer, a chase between the fat men and Patrick ensues. Brian, still at the house, shows Patrick's room to Lois, where several of his victims are either deceased or had been left for dead, and photographic evidence of Patrick killing them. Lois struggles with her denial but ultimately realizes that Patrick is a threat, and that he could harm Peter. Lois and Brian pursue Patrick and Peter into the woods, where Patrick is strangling Peter. Patrick quickly releases Peter after Lois threatens to stab Marion, his imaginary wife. Patrick apologizes, telling Lois that he never meant to hurt her, and the two agree he should be sent back to the mental hospital, where Lois and the family plan to visit him once a month.

== Cultural references ==
The episode's premise (a pleasant uncle revealed to be a strangler) is similar to that of Alfred Hitchcock's film Shadow of a Doubt. Patrick was traumatized as a child by Jackie Gleason after seeing him seduce his mother, Barbara, in front of him. While at the mental hospital, Stewie makes a reference to the movie Sling Blade. Peter says that he once “slayed a dragon,” which to cuts to Peter, in medieval armor, fighting and killing Cybill Shepherd. In one scene, Peter seen is talking to a pie. He says that “He knows what it wants,” as “He saw it in that movie,” and it's not worthy to have sex with him, referencing a scene in which the film's protagonist masturbates with an apple pie. Brian makes a reference to season-three Family Guy episode "To Love and Die in Dixie". Lois is shown watching the game show The Price Is Right. The cavemen who "invented singing" initially grunt "Mary Had A Little Lamb" before quickly evolving into an a cappella version of Billy Joel's "The Longest Time."

== Production ==
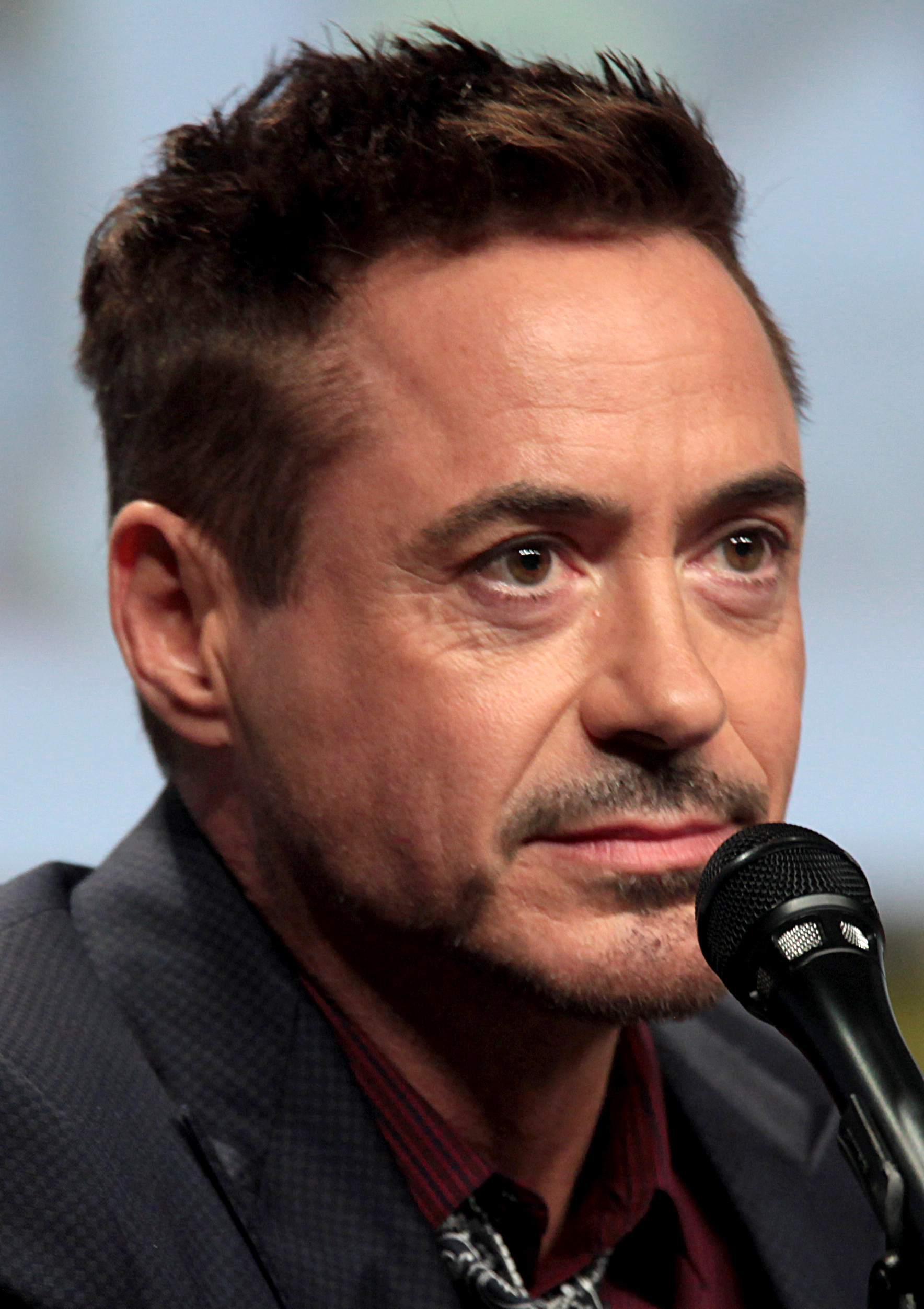
Robert Downey Jr. voiced Patrick in the episode

The origins of the episode and the character of Patrick began when Robert Downey Jr. telephoned the show production staff and asked if he could produce or assist in an episode creation, as his son is a fan of the show, so the producers came up with the character of Patrick for Downey. Show producer Seth MacFarlane believes Downey "did a great job," and brought a "very kind of half crazy, and maybe just eccentric personality to that character that really worked out great." When Patrick makes his second appearance in season 10's "Killer Queen", he is not voiced by Downey. Instead, he is voiced by Oliver Vaquer. Bob Barker voiced himself presenting The Price Is Right; but the actual sequence took years to make. Barker has provided his voice for the show twice, although MacFarlane has never met him. John Viener voiced Bobby McFerrin falling down a flight of stairs. The ball-in-a-cup scene is commented upon by MacFarlane, where he states that "the voice-overs work, the drawings work" and that Walter Murphy "did a great job of creating a piece of deliberately annoying music." Several jokes had been pitched for Peter's words after killing an evil dragon, but all were dropped, as they weren't deemed funny enough by production staff.

MacFarlane notes that he was surprised they were allowed to do the pickle gag, which consisted of Stewie placing a cucumber on the sofa where Patrick's imaginary wife is sitting, but inserting it into her imaginary vagina (to see if it would turn into a pickle), but suggests that maybe broadcasting standards did not fully understand the scene. The music song by the overweight people at a funeral for a murdered obese man was only shown on the DVD version and not televised, for timing purposes, and for potential boredom to viewers. The musical composition was recorded at Fox studios on the Gary Numan stage. George W. Bush is portrayed hiding in a tree house and being informed by Brian of Hurricane Katrina. Bush was offered the opportunity to voice himself, but declined.

A deleted scene had been made which showed the family traveling on board an airplane on which Peter, rather than using the airplane toilet as "he is too fat to get out of his seat," urinates in his seat, but unknowingly urinates on Brian in the process, as he is in a dog cage below Peter's seat. If this scene had been used in the episode, it was intended for Brian, after throwing a rock aimed at Peter's head, to say "that's for pissing on me!"

== Reception ==
In a review of the episode, TV Squad commented positively about the storyline, noting that "Unlike The Simpsons tonight, Family Guy actually did work their two storylines together. Their first big one, was about Peter's ever increasing weight problem. He skips out on going to his physical, so that he and Brian can go meet the guys at an all-you-can-eat steak restaurant." In a review of Family Guy, Volume 4, Nancy Basile regards "The Fat Guy Strangler" as one of her favorite episodes, as well as "PTV." Basile moves on to comment that "Being prejudiced against fat people just isn't talked about, but this episode sheds a harsh light on that problem. At times the episode tries to show people who are fat as being victims of unfair bias, but other times just out and out makes fun of them."
