= Petarded =

- Family Guy episode
- Episode no.: Season 4 Episode 6
- Directed by: Seth Kearsley
- Written by: Alec Sulkin; Wellesley Wild
- Production code: 4ACX09
- Original air date: June 19, 2005

Guest appearances
- LeVar Burton as Vern; Gary Cole; Barclay DeVeau as Patty; Phil LaMarr as Announcer/Judge; Cloris Leachman as herself; Len Maxwell; Natasha Melnick as Ruth; Nicole Sullivan as Esther; John Viener as Agent Jessup; Lisa Wilhoit as Beth

Episode chronology
← Previous "The Cleveland–Loretta Quagmire"	Next → "Brian the Bachelor"
- Family Guy season 4

"Petarded" is the sixth episode of the fourth season of the American animated television series Family Guy. It originally aired on Fox in the United States on June 19, 2005. It was written by Alec Sulkin and Wellesley Wild and directed by Seth Kearsley. In the episode, Peter takes the MacArthur Fellows Program test to see if he is a genius. However, he performs so poorly that he is declared technically retarded. Attempting to take advantage of the situation, he accidentally hospitalizes Lois while attempting to steal from a restaurant and loses custody of Meg, Chris, and Stewie.

The episode's title is a double entendre, being both portmanteau between "Peter" and "Retarded" and also a reference to the Shakespeare-coined phrase "hoist with his own petard". This title practice would later be used on a few more episodes, namely "Peterotica" and "Petergeist".

"Timer", a character from the 1970s Saturday morning public service announcements, made an appearance in the episode. Series producers tried to get Lennie Weinrib, the actor who had voiced him in the original cartoon segments, to make a guest appearance in the episode. However, Weinrib declined reprising the role as he could not accurately recall the character. "Petarded" gained a Nielsen rating of 4.4, making it the week's 42nd most-watched program. Critics and news sources responded with high praise and many regard this episode as Family Guy's best. Various scenes in the episode were removed by broadcast censors, including one musical number ("Peter is Slow"). It features the guest performances of LeVar Burton, Gary Cole, Barclay DeVeau, Indigo, Phil LaMarr, Cloris Leachman, Len Maxwell, Natasha Melnick, Nicole Sullivan, and Lisa Wilhoit, as well as several recurring voice actors for the series.

== Plot ==
The Griffins invite their neighbors over for game night. While playing Trivial Pursuit, Lois uses questions from the preschool edition for Peter in order to let him win. When Peter wins, he brags to everyone, believing himself to be smarter than everyone else. Irritated at Peter's arrogance, Brian challenges Peter to take the MacArthur Fellows Program test to prove he is a genius. The results of the test show that Peter is not a genius; in fact, the results show that Peter is technically "mentally retarded". Peter sinks into depression after being publicly labeled as intellectually disabled. While driving home with Lois, Peter accidentally knocks down Tom Tucker. Tucker, recognizing Peter as "the retarded fellow", does not press charges, and Peter realizes his condition means he can get away with anything.

While testing the limits of what he can get away with, such as interrupting church attendants by throwing Bibles, kicking open the stall doors in a girls' bathroom, and saying "testicles" through a microphone at a fast-food restaurant. While there, Peter goes behind the counter and sees a "Fryolator" and wants to take it home. However, he accidentally drenches Lois with hot grease, scalding her. While she is hospitalized, Child Protection Services takes custody of Meg, Chris, and Stewie on the grounds that Peter is mentally unfit to look after them. The three are placed in the care of Cleveland. When Brian tells Peter that he just has to show that he is a good parent, Peter thinks that the best way to do that is to show what a bad parent Cleveland is, so he brings seven prostitutes into Cleveland's house. This does not work as Agent Jessup sees through the plot and Cleveland orders Peter and five of the prostitutes out. In a last attempt, he appeals to the court for custody of his kids, but he is denied and avoids imprisonment only because the judge forgets that prisons exist.

After returning home and accepting that the Griffins may never be together again, Lois walks in, revealing she has completely recovered and reobtained custody of the kids. Peter is overjoyed that everything is back to normal, as well as the fact that Lois will smell like french fries for the next six months.

== Production ==
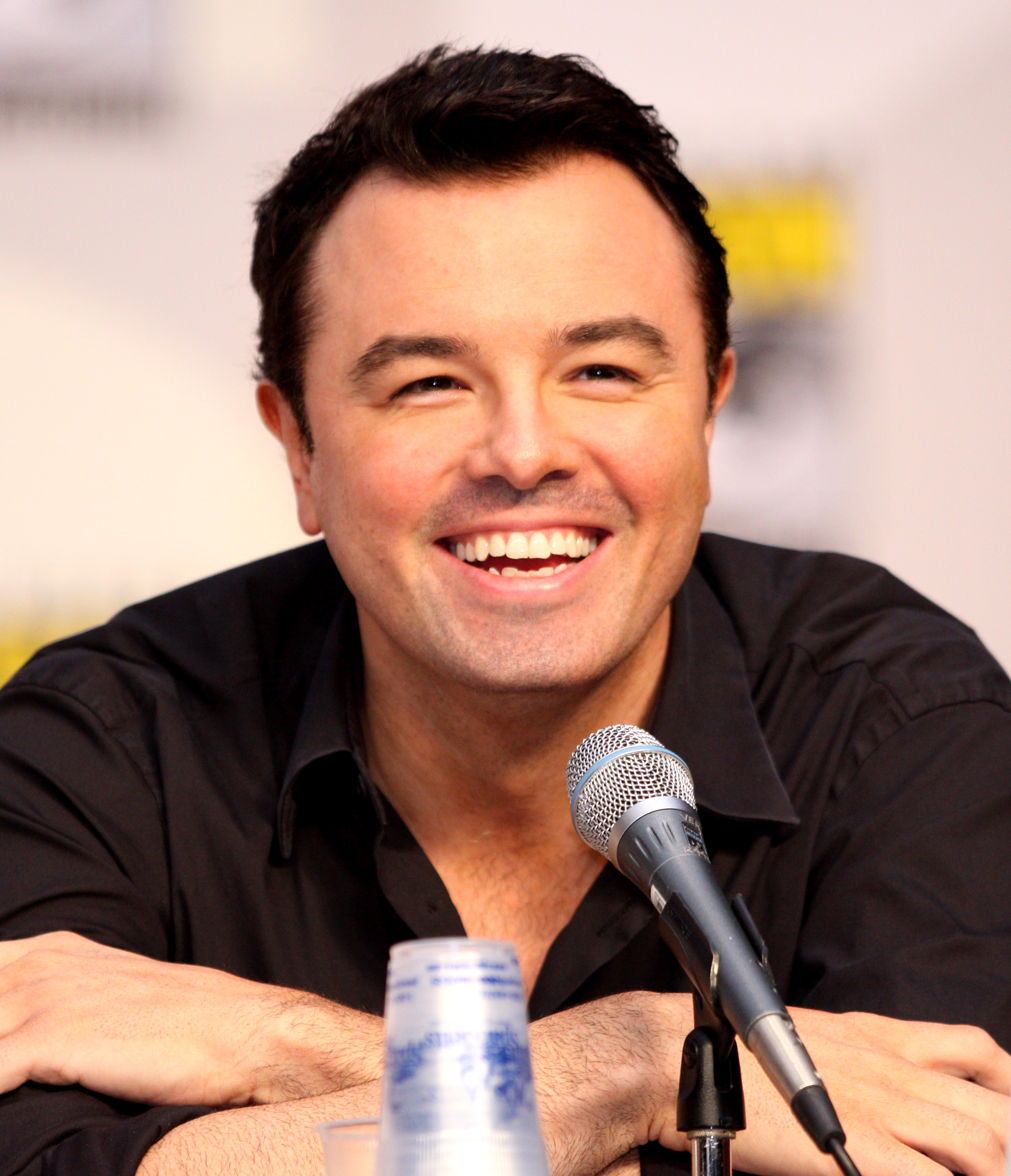
Family Guy's creator Seth MacFarlane came up with the idea for "Petarded".

"Petarded" was written by Alec Sulkin and Wellesley Wild and directed by former The Goode Family director Seth Kearsley before the conclusion of the fourth production season. Despite Sulkin and Wild writing the episode, the idea for "Petarded" came from series creator and executive producer Seth MacFarlane. The episode featured an appearance by "Timer", a character from 1970s Time for Timer Saturday morning cartoon public service announcements. Seth MacFarlane attempted to hire Lennie Weinrib, the actor who provided his voice for the character to appear in "Petarded" but, as MacFarlane describes in the DVD commentary, "he was a little old ... and he didn't remember doing it". Weinrib died one year after the debut of "Petarded".

In the original draft of the episode, Peter being asked easy questions during Trivial Pursuit was meant to be by chance, but executive producer David A. Goodman proposed the storyline of easy questions being given to Peter by Lois. Prior to the episode broadcast, several sequences were shown after Peter discovers he can get away with anything on the basis that he is mentally challenged including a "how loud can I yell" experiment, as well as tackling down an opponent going for a touchdown while attending a New England Patriots game, but they were not deemed funny enough and scrapped.

Various scenes in the episode were changed or removed because of broadcast censors. Originally, just after Peter hands Brian his test results from the MacArthur Program, Peter was to ask "Would a retarded person have peed in their pants?", then urinate in his trousers. However, because broadcasting standards prohibited this, it was changed to "Well, would a mentally retarded guy have hired a bulldozer with a drunk driver to level half of his house in celebration of his fantastic test results?". Brian stating to Peter "In your fucking face, Fuckwad" after Peter performs poorly on the test was censored from television broadcasting and on the censored track on the DVD, but can be heard uncensored on the uncensored audio track. This marks the first time that the word "fuck" has been heard uncensored in a Family Guy episode. The Family Guy orchestra sung and recorded a song for a sequence which showed several Quahog citizens learning and talking about Peter being declared as "retarded". However, this was removed from the episode because broadcasting standards believed it used the word "retarded" too many times. After Peter loses custody of the kids, Chris was originally to stay with Mort Goldman, Stewie with Cleveland and Meg with Quagmire. During this original sequence, Mort was to tell Chris that he has two anuses, causing Quagmire to force Meg to lock him in a safe room as he could not trust himself around Meg's friends, but the series was prohibited from broadcasting it by an unknown authority, presumably broadcasting standards.

In the episode's DVD commentary, MacFarlane addressed what viewers perceived to be a rather abrupt ending to the episode. As Peter has lost all hope in getting custody of his kids back, Lois walks through the front door, returning from the hospital, and has brought the kids home with her. MacFarlane stated, "Some of the fans actually noticed, commented on the fact that this was a very abrupt resolution, but, to that I would say, you're not watching CSI ... wouldn't you rather we throw in more jokes and fill up the time, and then hustle to the finish line at the last minute?".

In addition to the regular cast, actor LeVar Burton, voice actor Gary Cole, actress Barclay DeVeau, actress Indigo, voice actor Phil LaMarr, actress Cloris Leachman, actor Len Maxwell, actress Natasha Melnick, voice actress Nicole Sullivan, and actress Lisa Wilhoit guest starred in the episode. Recurring guest voice actors Johnny Brennan, Ralph Garman, writer Mike Henry, writer Danny Smith, writer Alec Sulkin, and writer John Viener made minor appearances. Recurring guest cast member Patrick Warburton reprised his role of Joe Swanson in the episode.

== Cultural references ==
- The episode is based on the 1985 movie Mask, a film about Roy L. Dennis who suffered from a rare bone disorder. This is acknowledged by a cutaway in the episode itself where Diana Adams actually touches Rocky's face and, despite Rocky claiming it wouldn't matter, finds herself utterly shocked and increasingly repulsed at the feeling of his face.
- Lois is seen having developed a tumor due to constantly repressing negative thoughts about having married a mentally challenged man. The tumor sings an altered version of the 1985 Falco song "Rock Me Amadeus".
- Peter is shown taking the MacArthur Fellows Program (also known as the "MacArthur Genius Grant") in his attempt to prove to Brian that he is a genius. When Peter takes the test, he uses a See 'n' Say instead of a calculator.
- The Time for Timer character shown singing and dancing is a reference to public service announcements broadcast in the 1970s on ABC on Saturday mornings (referencing in particular the well-known "I Hanker for a Hunk of Cheese" episode). When Peter thought what he would do with all his money from the MacArthur Genius Grant, he thought of legally buying Cloris Leachman, forcing her to juggle. Also on the Season 4 DVD commentary, Seth MacFarlane explained he wanted to hire Lennie Weinrib to reprise Timer for the gag, but Weinrib was suffering from failing health when "Petarded" was being produced and as MacFarlane explained, he "didn't remember doing it"; MacFarlane would ultimately provide the voice himself. Weinrib would die just over a year after "Petarded" first aired, on June 28, 2006.
- A deleted scene showing Quahog residents singing about Peter being intellectually disabled was a reference to music from Bye Bye Birdie.
- When Peter is talking about how it was more out of place than when Stewie was in an iPod commercial, the song performed is "The Warrior" by Scandal.
- While stalling in answering a Trivial Pursuit question, Peter arbitrarily mumbles the name of the superhero group The Fantastic Four.
- Peter watches an episode of Jake and the Fatman where "Fatman" McCabe's fatness and laziness is exaggerated.
- Vern, Peter's state-appointed inspiration counselor parodies a character of the same name in the movie Rain Man. His reference to Peter as his "main man" mirrors the movie in which Vern refers to Dustin Hoffman's autistic character in the same way.
- When Quagmire complains after being shot by Peter, Peter replies "Relax, you're doing better than Peter Weller in the opening scene from RoboCop". This a reference to a scene in the film RoboCop where Weller's character, Officer Alex Murphy, is on his knees, being repeatedly shot by Clarence Boddicker and his associates.
- When Cleveland sees the seven prostitutes in his house, Peter says, "Seven. Seven prostitutes", referencing The Count from Sesame Street.
- In the scene where it is shown that Peter is in fact retarded, the doctor uses a graph denoting intelligence groups in reference to a similar scene in Forrest Gump with the family guy chart showing “Average” intelligence followed below by “Retarded” where we see Peter's name yet below that still of lower intelligence than retarded people is a section labelled "Creationists".

== Reception ==
On June 19, 2005, the episode was first broadcast on Fox. It gained a Nielsen rating of 4.4, making it the 42nd most-watched show of the week of June 13 to June 19.

In 2014, to celebrate the show's 15th anniversary, IGN published a list of the 15 best Family Guy episodes, with "Petarded" ranked the best, saying: "The show is at its comedic best with this episode, with musical numbers and family drama to back up the offensive humor." In his review of Family Guy, volume 3, Francis Rizzo III of DVD Talk wrote "... I will say there are some very good episodes in this set, starting with 'Petarded', which sees Peter declared mentally retarded. The ways he takes advantage of this status is classic Family Guy material, while the musical montage here, involving phone calls all over town, is actually quite funny. Plus, the appearance of the Naked, Greased-Up Deaf Guy gave hope that the creators still had that sense of the bizarre in them."

John Nigro of The Pitt News considered "Petarded" one of volume 3's best episodes along with "Breaking Out Is Hard to Do" and "Perfect Castaway". The Sydney Morning Herald critic Marc McEvoy commented "Petarded" to be "a real thigh-slapper". Kim Voynar of TV Squad gave the episode a mixed review, saying "... it just seemed to wrap up a little too quickly for me, like they ran out of time and were like, 'Oops, let's wrap this up now'. Other than that quibble, though, it was a fairly funny episode." Tom Eames of entertainment website Digital Spy placed the episode at number five on his listing of the best Family Guy episodes in order of "yukyukyuks" and described the episode as "one of the best episodes ever" for fans of offensive humor. He also noted that the episode did not "go down all that well at the time with censors and charity groups".
