= Family Guy season 4 =

Season of television series

Family Guy
- Season 4
- DVD covers for Volumes 3 and 4
- Showrunners: David A. Goodman; Chris Sheridan
- Starring: Seth MacFarlane; Alex Borstein; Seth Green; Mila Kunis
- No. of episodes: 30

Release
- Original network: Fox
- Original release: May 1, 2005 – May 21, 2006

Season chronology
- ← Previous; Season 3 Next → Season 5

The fourth season of Family Guy aired on Fox from May 1, 2005, to May 21, 2006, and consists of thirty episodes, making it the longest season to date. The first half of the season is included within the volume 3 DVD box set, which released on November 29, 2005, and the second half within the volume 4 DVD box set, which released on November 14, 2006. Volume 4 is split into seasons 4 and 5 in regions outside the United States, leading to confusion over season numbers between U.S., Australian, and UK consumers. The last three episodes of season 4 are the basis for the movie known as Stewie Griffin: The Untold Story, and are edited for content; Fox does not include these episodes in the official episode count.

Family Guy had been cancelled in 2002 due to low ratings, but was revived by Fox in 2005 after reruns on Adult Swim became the cable network's most-watched program, and more than three million DVDs of the show were sold. "North by North Quahog" was the first episode to air following the series' revival.

The season received generally positive reviews from critics, who praised its humor and called the season "irreverent" and "as funny as ever".

The executive producers for the fourth production season are series creator Seth MacFarlane, along with David A. Goodman and Chris Sheridan. Starting with this season, MacFarlane would hand over showrunner duties to two writers, with Goodman and Sheridan being the inaugural co-showrunners.

== Voice cast and characters ==
- Seth MacFarlane as Peter Griffin, Brian Griffin, Stewie Griffin, Glenn Quagmire, Tom Tucker, Carter Pewterschmidt
- Alex Borstein as Lois Griffin, Loretta Brown, Tricia Takanawa, Babs Pewterschmidt
- Seth Green as Chris Griffin, Neil Goldman
- Mila Kunis as Meg Griffin

=== Supporting characters ===
- Lori Alan as Diane Simmons
- H. Jon Benjamin as Carl
- Johnny Brennan as Mort Goldman
- Carrie Fisher as Angela
- Mike Henry as Cleveland Brown
- Nicole Sullivan as Esther
- Patrick Warburton as Joe Swanson
- Adam West as Mayor Adam West

== Episodes ==
No. overall	No. in season	Title	Directed by	Written by	Original release date	Prod. code	U.S. viewers (millions)
51	1	"North by North Quahog"	Peter Shin	Seth MacFarlane	May 1, 2005	4ACX01	11.87
Realizing their marriage has lost its spice because of Lois calling several male actors' names while having sex, Peter and Lois go on a second honeymoon, and leave Brian in charge of the kids. On their way over, Peter accidentally crashes the car, and he decides to pose as actor Mel Gibson so he and Lois can stay in his luxury hotel suite. They discover and attempt to destroy a copy of the unwanted sequel of The Passion of the Christ, and run afoul of the priests who come to retrieve it. As Peter buries the film in a cornfield, Lois is kidnapped by Gibson's associates, who want the film in return. Peter exchanges the film reel for Lois on the top of Mount Rushmore. As they are about to leave, Gibson discovers that Peter has replaced the film with dog feces, leading to a chase. Gibson eventually falls off the mountain, and Peter and Lois have intercourse on the face of the mountain and put the spice back in their marriage. Meanwhile, when Chris is caught and is accused of drinking alcohol by Jake Tucker, Brian and Stewie attempt to reveal his bad behavior to Tom Tucker, Jake's father, but Tom rejects this. Then, they both put drugs in Jake's locker, resulting in Jake's arrest.
52	2	"Fast Times at Buddy Cianci Jr. High"	Pete Michels	Ken Goin	May 8, 2005	4ACX02	9.90
Brian becomes a substitute English teacher at Chris' school, after the departure of the former English teacher. Brian is transferred to a class for troubled hoodlum teenagers and has a hard time reaching them. He eventually inspires them to aspire to low-level jobs. Meanwhile, Chris becomes attracted to Mrs. Lockhart, Brian's replacement teacher. She promises to return his love if he helps her murder her husband. Chris does not agree, and Mrs. Lockhart gets a bear to commit the crime. Lois and the rest of the family assume Chris murdered Mr. Lockhart and cover up the crime, until the Channel 5 News reports that he was not involved.
53	3	"Blind Ambition"	Chuck Klein	Steve Callaghan	May 15, 2005	4ACX04	9.26
After he is discovered spying on Lois in the ladies room, Quagmire is soon arrested and is taught self-control through operant conditioning by Peter and his friends. He finds it hard to depart from his sexual behavior and, trying to adapt to normal life, he accidentally enters a CCTV camera operation room, where he notices a woman in a changing room is having a heart attack. He gives her CPR and is praised by the Quahog community for his heroic behavior, though he intended to molest the woman while she was unconscious. Jealous of his friend's achievement, Peter does whatever he can to achieve something he will be remembered for. However, his ambitions, ultimately cost him his eyesight. While he is blind, he unknowingly rescues the owner of the local bar from a fire and is awarded a medal by the mayor and receives an eye transplant from a homeless man after Peter's seeing-eye dog accidentally drags the man to death.
54	4	"Don't Make Me Over"	Sarah Frost	Gene Laufenberg	June 5, 2005	4ACX03	7.35
Meg gets a makeover to boost her confidence. Meanwhile, Peter aspires to start a rock band, along with Meg's new singing voice, which causes the entire family to become a traveling band and earns them a spot on Saturday Night Live as Meg develops an extremely arrogant and rude attitude. Meg is seduced by Jimmy Fallon, and has sexual intercourse with him, but discovers that the entire encounter is being aired on live television as part of the show. Peter attacks and beats up Fallon in revenge. Afterward, Meg returns to her old look as she feels "being beautiful is too much work". It is then revealed that the entire show is on a set, and the Griffins leave the living room and walk to the main stage where the rest of the episode's cast has gathered, Peter thanks everyone in the style of Saturday Night Live.
55	5	"The Cleveland–Loretta Quagmire"	James Purdum	Mike Henry & Patrick Henry	June 12, 2005	4ACX08	8.21
Cleveland's wife Loretta starts an affair with Quagmire and is secretly caught red-handed by Peter and Brian. Brian and Peter eventually inform Cleveland, who encounters Loretta. Loretta leaves Cleveland because she feels he is too soft. Because Cleveland responds in his usual mild-mannered way, Peter decides to teach Cleveland to express his true emotions. When one of his methods finally works, Cleveland becomes mad and intends to kill Quagmire. However, when Cleveland locates Quagmire, he realizes he can't kill another human being, even though he betrayed him. Cleveland and Quagmire apologize to each other and Cleveland divorces Loretta for her behavior and sexual intercourse with Quagmire. At Quagmire's insistence, they take out their remaining aggressions on each other in a boxing ring.
56	6	"Petarded"	Seth Kearsley	Alec Sulkin & Wellesley Wild	June 19, 2005	4ACX09	7.17
Peter becomes so convinced that he is a genius that Brian challenges him to prove it. Peter takes the MacArthur Fellows Program, which reveals that Peter is intellectually disabled. While Peter is initially depressed, he observes that people more easily forgive his actions when he states he is retarded, meaning he can get away with a lot of things. While exploiting the perks that come with his handicap he accidentally throws boiling oil on Lois. While she is recovering, Child Protection Services takes away Peter's custody of Meg, Chris, and Stewie, due to their contention that Peter is mentally unfit to look after them. However, when he is unable to regain custody of his kids and accepts that his family may never reunite, Lois, who fully recovered, enters the house and explains she regained custody of the kids.
57	7	"Brian the Bachelor"	Dan Povenmire	Mark Hentemann	June 26, 2005	4ACX10	7.34
Peter, Quagmire and Joe try to help Cleveland find a new girlfriend after his break-up with Loretta. Peter takes him to auditions for ABC reality show The Bachelorette, but Brian eventually ends up being cast, after Peter and Cleveland are caught on a ridiculous manner (courtesy of Peter). Brian does not like the show and only joins for a vacation. However, he discovers he has a lot in common with the bachelorette, Brooke. She eventually picks Brian, but all the romance is gone once the cameras are turned off. Meanwhile, Chris befriends a talking pimple on his face, who orders him to make mischief. The pimple gets Chris into breaking property of Mort's Goldman's Pharmacy. When Joe discovers that Chris is the person behind the crimes, Peter chases Chris with a belt as Joe joins the chase and Lois shattering in tears. However, when Chris decides to go to a dermatology clinic, the pimple threatens him with a gun, but Chris is eventually able to "kill" it.
58	8	"8 Simple Rules for Buying My Teenage Daughter"	Greg Colton	Patrick Meighan	July 10, 2005	4ACX11	6.12
Peter opens a tab at Mort Goldman's pharmacy, unaware of how the tab system works; Peter simply believes he can buy a lot of things without having to pay for them. When Goldman calls in Peter's debt of $34,000, Peter sells him Meg to cover the expenses. The Goldmans start using Meg as a slave. Brian finds a clause in the contract stating that it is invalid if Neil cheats on Meg. Lois dresses up as Mystique and seduces Neil at a fake X-Men convention. Neil tells Meg that he only wants her to be with him if she wants to be with him and tears up the contract. Meanwhile, Stewie falls for Liddane, his new babysitter who already has a boyfriend. Stewie ties him up and puts him in the trunk of Brian's car. After Liddane punishes Stewie for touching her breast, Stewie drugs her and frames her, telling Lois she invited friends over to the house to do drugs. However, once Lois fires Liddane, Stewie realizes he has made a mistake, but is unable to find her.
59	9	"Breaking Out Is Hard to Do"	Kurt Dumas	Tom Devanney	July 17, 2005	4ACX12	5.65
Lois becomes kleptomaniacal and is sent to prison after she goes on a shoplifting spree, which leaves the rest of the family in a terrible state of disarray. To bring their lives back to normal, Peter breaks Lois out of jail and, as fugitives from the law, he intends to start a new life with his family in "Asiantown". However, they are eventually tracked down by Joe, who pursues them through the city sewers. On the run from Joe, Lois decides to surrender and face the consequences. As he tries to catch them, Joe slips and nearly falls from a ledge. Lois pulls him to safety, and to thank her, Joe manages to get her sentence cancelled.
60	10	"Model Misbehavior"	Sarah Frost	Steve Callaghan	July 24, 2005	4ACX13	7.04
Lois fulfills her lifelong dream of being a fashion model after appearing in her underwear in the newspaper. Peter, however, grows increasingly concerned that she may be losing touch with reality. After he limits her options as a model, Lois becomes more and more rebellious and Peter decides to ask Lois' father Carter for help. However, once they kidnap Lois at a Vogue party, Peter realizes that Carter's methods are too harsh and tells Lois she has the right to be a model if it makes her happy. Realizing that she has had the freedom to fulfill her wishes, Lois decides to quit modeling after all. In a subplot Brian works on a pyramid scheme with Stewie to pay off a debt to him. However, Brian eventually gets fed up with Stewie's pretending Ca$hscam is a real company. He gets mad and is fired by Stewie.
61	11	"Peter's Got Woods"	Chuck Klein & Zac Moncrief	Danny Smith	September 11, 2005	4ACX14	9.13
Brian falls for Shauna, an African-American teacher at Meg's school, and petitions to have the name of the "James Woods High School" changed just to please her. Peter objects and has James Woods come to the school to protect its name, even though Woods was in delight to have the school's name changed. Peter and James become friends and start to hang out together, with Woods eventually taking over Brian's place. Shauna is upset that Brian and Peter are still friends after Peter's actions, and makes Brian choose between her and Peter. Brian breaks up with Shauna and eventually patches his differences with Peter at the local bar. Woods, unhappy with Brian and Peter becoming friends again, becomes extremely obsessive and obnoxious. Peter and Brian get rid of him by laying out a long line of Reese's Pieces as a promatic bait, trapping him in a crate and sending him to be stored away in a Secret Government Warehouse with hundreds of similar crates.
62	12	"Perfect Castaway"	James Purdum	John Viener	September 18, 2005	4ACX15	9.59
Peter, Quagmire, Cleveland and Joe go on a fishing trip, but their boat sinks when a storm breaks loose. They survive on a raft built out of Quagmire's sex dolls and set ashore on a desert island. Several months later, they are rescued by a passing cruise ship. Upon returning home, Peter finds that Lois has married Brian, thinking her husband was dead. While Lois is overjoyed when she learns Peter is alive, she is torn between her love for Peter and her commitment to Brian. Peter then has sex with Lois, restoring their love for each other. Brian eventually decides that it would be better for Lois to return to Peter as he understands her internal battle.
63	13	"Jungle Love"	Seth Kearsley	Mark Hentemann	September 25, 2005	4ACX16	8.68
Chris runs away from his home after getting hazed on his first day of high school as a freshman and joins the Peace Corps, after which he is dropped off in South America. Peter gets a job at the Pawtucket Brewery, where the beer is free as long as employees do not drink during their shift. Peter is unable to control his drinking and is demoted; ending up as a subordinate to a mentally handicapped man named Opie and working for a new manager named Angela. In South America, Chris becomes popular with the natives, but unwittingly marries the daughter of the chief. Chris' family travels to South America as soon as they hear of the marriage. Upon their arrival Peter is seen as the richest man in the country with just US$37; he takes advantage of this by paying the natives small sums of money to act according to his whimsy. Chris accuses Peter of using the tribe to get away from his trouble, but realizes he did the same. Before he has time to think, the natives discover that he is a freshman and chase them away from their land, which the family manages to escape, apart from Meg.
64	14	"PTV"	Dan Povenmire	Alec Sulkin & Wellesley Wild	November 6, 2005	4ACX17	8.59
A "trouser malfunction" on live-broadcast TV at the Emmys prompts the FCC to censor even mildly objectionable content on TV. Outraged, Peter and Brian create their own TV station "PTV", filled with all-around obscene programming. When the FCC picks up on this due to Lois' call, they shut down the channel. When Peter argues that they can not stop people from being who they are or how they live, the FCC go to drastic measures by censoring all of real life. Extremely annoyed by their actions, Peter and Lois lobby Congress to have the FCC's rulings reversed. Though they disagree at first, Peter convinces them when he points out the resemblance of many Washington buildings to various crude body parts, leading the Congress into firing the FCC employees and putting the censoring of Quahog off.
65	15	"Brian Goes Back to College"	Greg Colton	Matt Fleckenstein	November 13, 2005	4ACX18	9.20
Peter, Joe, Cleveland, and Quagmire attend a costume contest as characters from The A-Team. Peter and his friends find Brian, who is writing a report for the local newspaper. When Peter and his friends win the costume contest because of having a black member, Cleveland, Brian writes a report about it, and is later telephoned by a member of The New Yorker, who tell him they would like him to work for their magazine. Brian is initially given a warm welcome by the staff, but he is immediately fired after he informs them he never graduated from college. After encouragement from Lois, Brian decides to return to Brown University in order to complete his education so he can return to The New Yorker. However, he must deal with his temptations to cheat in order to pass the class.
66	16	"The Courtship of Stewie's Father"	Kurt Dumas	Kirker Butler	November 20, 2005	4ACX19	9.08
After a talk with the preschool teacher about Stewie's behavior, Lois is concerned, and because of Peter being so occupied with work, suggests Peter to spend some time bonding with him. Peter quickly realizes that Stewie enjoys seeing him hurt Lois, and begins bonding with Stewie by playing pranks on and assaulting Lois. Meanwhile, Peter gets annoyed because he never gets Employee of the Month at the Pawtucket Brewery. It always goes to his mentally challenged co-worker, Opie, and he thinks it is because his supervisor, Angela, hates him.
67	17	"The Fat Guy Strangler"	Sarah Frost	Chris Sheridan	November 27, 2005	4ACX20	9.85
After finding an old family picture showing a brother she never knew she had, Lois sets out to find her unknown sibling. However, her father denies it, so she sneaks into her parents' house to find information. When she finds out that her brother, Patrick, is in a mental hospital, she visits him, and releases him after having a brief conversation. Back at the Griffins' house, Patrick explains that, after a traumatic experience involving Jackie Gleason, he holds a grudge against the obese. While he is released, his traumatic experience occurs towards Peter, since Peter is overweight. Meanwhile, after a physical with Dr. Hartman, Peter realizes that he is fat and starts an advocacy group for fat people's rights.
68	18	"The Father, the Son, and the Holy Fonz"	James Purdum	Danny Smith	December 18, 2005	4ACX22	8.26
Francis Griffin, Peter's father, who is very dedicated in the Catholic faith, visits Quahog and insists that Stewie be baptized. Francis and Peter go to St. Philip's, where the priest refuses to baptize Stewie because he claims the holy water is tainted. Francis does not believe this and pushes Stewie onto the baptismal font. Stewie quickly becomes sick, so Peter and Lois take him to the hospital, where a doctor quickly and correctly diagnoses Stewie's condition as exposure to tainted water. Stewie is quarantined in a germ-free environment. Lois asks Peter what his religious beliefs are, sending him on a quest to find out.
69	19	"Brian Sings and Swings"	Chuck Klein & Zac Moncrief	Michael Rowe	January 8, 2006	4ACX21	8.10
Brian is nearly killed when Peter hits him with the car. He recovers but he's depressed by the uncertainty of life and death. He meets Frank Sinatra Jr. and is inspired by his live-for-today lifestyle. Brian follows in his footsteps by singing with him in concerts on a regular basis. On one night, Brian had to babysit Stewie, so he had no choice but to bring him along to one of his concerts, but he had to stay backstage. Stewie with nothing to do, decides to join Brian on stage by telling jokes and singing. Brian does not perform anymore due to his alcoholic issues during performances and leads him into anger from Peter and Lois confronting him. Meanwhile, Sarah, a girl in Meg's science class, invites Meg to her after-school club. Thrilled at being included, Meg agrees but discovers the club is the Lesbian Alliance. She joins anyway and pretends to be a lesbian because the girls in the group treat her as a friend.
70	20	"Patriot Games"	Cyndi Tang	Mike Henry	January 29, 2006	4ACX25	9.08
Peter becomes a player for the New England Patriots football team after Tom Brady picks up on his display of impressive charging skills at a high school reunion, however, Peter's attitude forces Tom into removing Peter from the team into playing for a British football team. Meanwhile, Brian loses a bet with Stewie and he must pay him his money. When Brian fails once, Stewie brutally beats him and another time, he beats Brian with a golf club, shooting him in the leg, and torches him with a flamethrower. Brian finally pays him, and Stewie lets Brian have his revenge but Brian will not tell him when the revenge is coming, which makes Stewie paranoid and frightened. At the finale, Brian has his revenge by pushing Stewie in the road and getting him hit by a bus while in London.
71	21	"I Take Thee Quagmire"	Seth Kearsley	Tom Maxwell, Don Woodard & Steve Callaghan	March 12, 2006	4ACX23	8.06
When Peter makes a surprise win on Wheel of Fortune, he wins a free maid for a week. While he shows off how he could cause a huge mess for her to clean up, she meets Quagmire when he came over to his house, who then immediately falls for her. He gives up his philandering ways and becomes a caring lover as proposes to Joan at the sea shore at sunset. Meanwhile, Lois is concerned when Stewie’s teeth causes her pain during breastfeeding. Brian suggests that Lois begin weaning Stewie, to which Stewie objects. He becomes desperate for breastmilk, going as far as replacing the baby of another mother to get what he wanted.
72	22	"Sibling Rivalry"	Dan Povenmire	Cherry Chevapravatdumrong	March 26, 2006	4ACX24	8.22
After a pregnancy scare, Peter agrees to get a vasectomy, but before the surgery, he goes to donate his sperm in case he and Lois want to have another baby in the future. However, while donating his sperm, he accidentally knocks a large rack of samples over and replaces them himself so that he won't get in trouble, with one of his own. One of the recipients of his sperm is a lesbian couple, who give birth to Stewie's half-brother Bertram, who appeared in "Emission Impossible". Meanwhile, after the vasectomy, Peter does not have any interest in his sex life anymore. Lois does not like this and takes out her frustration by eating and because of this, she gains some weight. After Peter makes fun of her curvy figure, Lois' eating out of frustration turns into eating out of spite as she deliberately puts on more weight, eventually growing even fatter than Peter is. In bed one night as they try to ignore each other, they accidentally have sex and Peter realizes that he finds Lois much sexier as a fat woman. Thanks to Lois' massive figure, their sex life is restored.
73	23	"Deep Throats"	Greg Colton	Alex Borstein	April 9, 2006	4ACX26	7.83
When Meg lands an internship with Mayor Adam West, Brian feels pressured to get a job to avoid being branded "the new Meg" by the family. He gets a job driving a taxi, but when he receives a $400 parking ticket, he argues to the Mayor that he's corrupt. Determined to expose his shady ways, Brian and Stewie go undercover and discover that Meg is in deeper than they thought as she is engaged in an innocent, yet secret, relationship with the mayor. When Brian confronts Meg with pictures of her and the Mayor, she tells Adam, and because of what she did, he ends the relationship to protect her from getting her name dragged through the mud. Meanwhile, a local talent show, in which Peter and Lois planned on participating in, brought them back to their folk singing days. Unfortunately, they also revert to their hippie ways, smoking pot to conjure ideas for songs. Oblivious in their high state, Peter and Lois horribly blunder their performance at the show and lose.
74	24	"Peterotica"	Kurt Dumas	Patrick Meighan	April 23, 2006	4ACX27	7.91
Peter buys an erotic book which he reads but finds disappointment after doing so. He writes a letter to the publisher, suggesting how he would have written the book differently. Impressed by his letter, his friends suggest he write his own erotic book. After taking their advice, Peter writes his own book, and it sells well from its beginning stages as a xeroxed, stapled manuscript to its later incarnation as a professionally produced audiobook read by Betty White, and published by Carter Pewterschmidt. Meanwhile, Stewie practices to be a gymnast in the Olympics. He practices pole vaulting with the unconscious Chris as a cushion.
75	25	"You May Now Kiss the... Uh... Guy Who Receives"	Dominic Polcino	David A. Goodman	April 30, 2006	4ACX28	7.45
Mayor West, facing growing outrage from the town for spending the entire treasury on a statue, bans gay marriage to distract everyone's attention, and it worked. Jasper is heartbroken and Brian decides to do something about it. He goes around gathering signatures on a petition supporting gay marriage. Lois is struggling with the idea of gay marriage and refuses to sign Brian's petition. Alyssa, who Chris is dating and is against gay marriage, tells Chris that if he destroys the petition she will let him touch her boobs. After he burned them, Brian stays up all night gathering another 10,000 signatures. When he finally presents it to Mayor West, he tosses it out of the window. What Mayor West did was the last straw for Brian, as he grabs a gun from a cop and takes him hostage. When Lois sees Brian on TV for what he's doing, she realizes how strongly he feels and changes her mind about gay marriage. She goes down to the courthouse and convinces Brian to give himself up. Since Brian kidnapping has distracted everyone from the statue situation, Mayor West tears up the gay marriage ban, and in the end, Jasper and Ricardo have their wedding.
76	26	"Petergeist"	Sarah Frost	Alec Sulkin & Wellesley Wild	May 7, 2006	4ACX29	8.47
After Joe builds a home theater, Peter tries to build a multiplex in his backyard just out of spite. While doing construction, Peter finds the skull of a deceased Indian Chief buried in the backyard. Brian urges him to put the skull back, but Peter decides to use it as a novelty. That night, the Griffins start experiencing strange paranormal activity, such as Stewie talking to the TV static, the chairs and refrigerator being stacked upside down on the kitchen table, and Chris getting attacked by an evil tree before being saved by Herbert. Lois is in denial of the events that are happening, until Stewie gets sucked into his closet and disappears. To find Stewie, the Griffins hire a spiritual medium to contact the other side, and learn that the entrance to spirit world is Stewie’s closet, while the exit is Meg's rear end. After they eventually rescue Stewie, the spirits ravage the Griffin house. As the Griffins drive off away from the scene, Peter dumps the native American skull in a garbage can, restoring things to normal.
77	27	"The Griffin Family History"	Zac Moncrief	John Viener	May 14, 2006	4ACX30	8.03
Lois is trying to get Peter to brush his teeth when they hear a noise coming from downstairs. Peter looks downstairs and finds three robbers in balaclavas. The whole family wakes up and Meg startles Peter, and in a delayed response, he hits her in the head with the baseball bat he was carrying. The whole family then flee to Peter's panic room. It is a small steel room with boxes and TV monitors that can be used to watch every room in the house. Unfortunately, the room has no phone, so Peter decides to tell stories about the Griffin family history. Unfortunately, after telling the stories, Peter accidentally activates the fire sprinklers with a flare gun, threatening to drown the family. As the water is reaching its peak, Joe shows up and opens the door. Due to what he did, all of the water drains out of the room, saving their lives.
78	28	"Stewie B. Goode" (Note: "Stewie B. Goode", "Bango Was His Name, Oh!" and "Stu and Stewie's Excellent Adventure" make up the direct-to-DVD movie Stewie Griffin: The Untold Story.) (Part 1)	Pete Michels	Gary Janetti & Chris Sheridan	May 21, 2006	4ACX05	8.20
Peter and Lois try to teach Stewie how to swim. After meeting the star pupil of the swimming class, Brad, Stewie finds he can not compete with him. Attempting to beat him in a race, Stewie ends up barely leaving the starting line, and because of this, he attempts to kill Brad. Meanwhile, at the Lackluster Video store, Peter starts ranting on how the new video store will not sell pornography. While he continues, Tom Tucker from Channel 5 News was there and wants to give Peter his own segment called "You Know What Really Grinds My Gears?". The segment instantly becomes popular, causing Tom to become jealous of Peter's fame. The next day he attempts to sabotage Peter's segment, leading to the network head's firing of Tom. After a short period, Tom Tucker learns about Stewie driving the car into the Drunken Clam under the influence. Peter's lack of parenting skills lead to him being fired and Tom Tucker being rehired.
79	29	"Bango Was His Name, Oh!" (Part 2)	Pete Michels	Alex Borstein	May 21, 2006	4ACX06	7.87
Visiting a local electronic store to get a new VCR, Peter and Lois are persuaded into buying a TiVo. Once home, Brian and Stewie are watching a news interview when Stewie sees someone identical to him. Stewie believes that the man he sees is his real father. When he discovered this, he starts trying to make money for a flight to California and once Stewie is ready, he learns that Quagmire is going to the same location as he is, and changes his plans to go along with him. Brian stops him, and insisted of going with him. Meanwhile, Peter is trying to have sex with Lois but Chris and Meg keep intruding. Lois and Peter decide to get their kids to start dating. Lois teaches Chris how to treat a woman, manners, eating out, and to name the women of Sex and the City through example and torture, while Peter teaches Meg how to treat a man through shaving his back and loving the man's flatulence.
80	30	"Stu and Stewie's Excellent Adventure" (Part 3)	Pete Michels	Steve Callaghan	May 21, 2006	4ACX07	8.14
"Stu", as Stewie's future self is called, is taking a time-travel vacation. When Stu travels back to the future, Stewie stows away with him. Stu passes off Stewie as a Nicaraguan boy named Pablo. Stewie learns that at age 35, he will be a virgin working for the Quahog Circuit Shack, and living by himself in an apartment. Disgusted with the way his life will turn out, Stewie remodels Stu's apartment and gets him to lose his virginity to his co-worker Fran. The next day, Fran tells everyone about it, costing Stu his job for having relations with a co-worker. With his life now ruined, Stu laments the day of his near-death experience at the Community Pool, revealing that memories of the experience will re-surface when Stewie is twenty, causing him to regress and preventing him from taking any risks.

== Production ==
In 2002, Family Guy was canceled after three seasons due to low ratings. Fox tried to sell rights for reruns of the show, but it was hard to find networks that were interested; Cartoon Network eventually bought the rights, "[...] basically for free", according to the president of 20th Century Fox Television Production. When the reruns were shown on Cartoon Network's Adult Swim in 2003, Family Guy became the channel's most-watched show with an average 1.9 million viewers per episode. Following this, the show's first season was released on DVD in April 2003. The DVD set sold 2.2 million copies, making it the best-selling television DVD of 2003 and the second highest-selling television DVD ever, behind the first season of Comedy Central's Chappelle's Show. The season 2 DVD release also sold more than 1 million copies. The show's popularity in both DVD sales and reruns rekindled Fox's interest. They ordered 35 new episodes in 2004, marking the first revival of a television show based on DVD sales. Gail Berman said cancelling the show was one of her most difficult decisions, and she was therefore happy it would return. The network also began production of a film based on the show. It would also air on Sundays again for the first time since the first season.

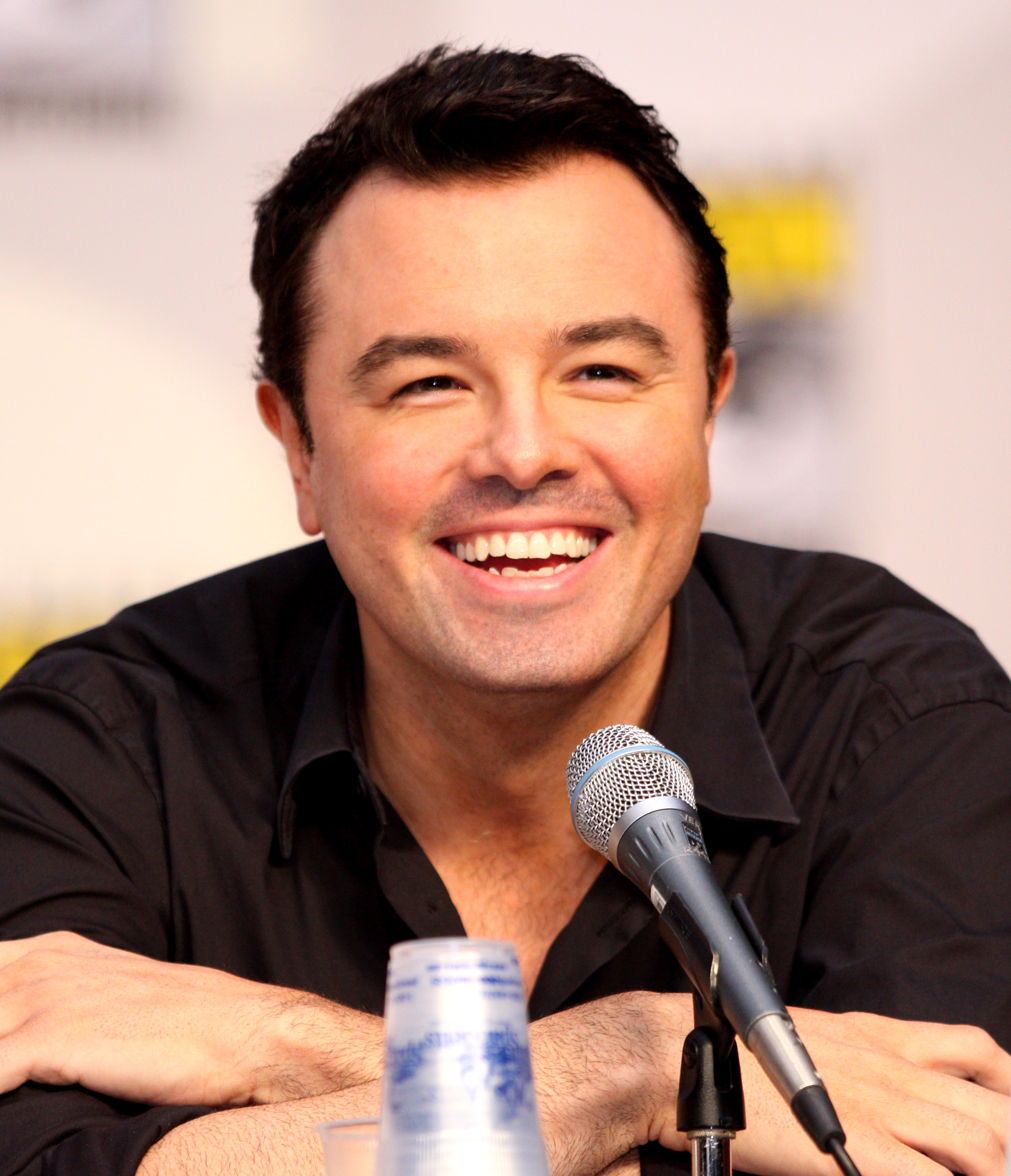
Creator Seth MacFarlane wrote the season premiere "North by North Quahog".

"North by North Quahog" was the first episode to be broadcast after the show's cancellation. It was written by Seth MacFarlane and directed by Peter Shin. MacFarlane believed the show's three-year hiatus was beneficial because animated shows do not normally have hiatuses, and towards the end of their seasons "... you see a lot more sex jokes and (bodily function) jokes and signs of a fatigued staff that their brains are just fried". With "North by North Quahog", the writing staff tried to keep the show "... exactly as it was" before its cancellation, and did not "... have the desire to make it any slicker" than it already was. Walter Murphy, who had composed music for the show before its cancellation, returned to compose the music for "North by North Quahog". Murphy and the orchestra recorded an arrangement of Bernard Herrmann's score from North by Northwest, a film referenced multiple times in the episode.

Fox had ordered five episode scripts at the end of the third season; these episodes had been written but not produced. One of these scripts was adapted into "North by North Quahog". The original script featured Star Wars character Boba Fett, and later actor, writer and producer Aaron Spelling, but the release of the iconic film The Passion of the Christ inspired the writers to incorporate Mel Gibson into the episode. Multiple endings were written, including one in which Death comes for Gibson. During production, an episode of South Park was released entitled "The Passion of the Jew" that also featured Gibson as a prominent character. This gave the Family Guy writers pause, fearing accusations "[...] that we had ripped them off."

== Reception ==
=== Ratings ===
The season received high Nielsen ratings; the season premiere, "North by North Quahog", was broadcast as part of an animated television night on Fox, alongside two episodes of The Simpsons and the pilot episode of American Dad!. The episode was watched by 11.85 million viewers, the show's highest ratings since the airing of the first season episode "Brian: Portrait of a Dog". Its ratings also surpassed the ratings of both episodes of The Simpsons and American Dad!. Season four's three-part finale was watched by 8.2 million viewers, bringing the season average to 7.9 million viewers per episode.

=== Awards and nominations ===
The season was nominated for a number of awards. In 2005, the Academy of Television Arts & Sciences nominated "North by North Quahog" for a Primetime Emmy Award for Outstanding Animated Program (for Programming Less Than One Hour). It nominated "PTV" in the same category one year later. Neither of the episodes won the award, as South Park received the award in 2005 and The Simpsons was the eventual recipient of the award in 2006. Peter Shin and Dan Povenmire were both nominated for an Annie Award in the Best Directing in an Animated Television Production category, for directing "North by North Quahog" and "PTV" respectively; Shin eventually won the award. MacFarlane won the Annie Award for Best Voice-over Performance for providing the voice of Stewie in "Brian the Bachelor". At the Annie Awards the following year, John Viener was nominated in the category Writing in an Animated Television Production, for writing "Untitled Griffin Family History", but lost the award to Ian Maxtone-Graham, who wrote the episode of The Simpsons titled "The Seemingly Neverending Story". The editors of the episode "Blind Ambition" won the Motion Picture Sound Editors Golden Reel Award for Best Sound Editing in Television Animated.

=== Critical reception ===
Season 4 received positive reviews from critics. Reviewing the season premiere, Mark McGuire of The Times Union wrote: "... the first minute or so of the resurrected Family Guy ranks among the funniest 60 seconds I've seen so far this season." The Pitt News reviewer John Nigro felt that the show had not lost its steam while it was on hiatus, and was surprised that the show had been canceled because of its "wildly extravagant shock factor". Nigro cited "Breaking Out Is Hard to Do", "Petarded" and "Perfect Castaway" as the season's best episodes. In 2007, BBC Three named the episode "PTV" "The Best Episode...So Far". The episode has also been praised by Maureen Ryan of the Chicago Tribune, who called it "Family Guy's most rebellious outing yet". The Boston Globe critic Matthew Gilbert felt Family Guy's fourth season was as "crankily irreverent as ever".

Fewer critics responded negatively to the season; Seattle Post-Intelligencer critic Melanie McFarland reacted very bitterly, stating "Three years off the air has not made the Family Guy team that much more creative". Critics of both PopMatters and IGN criticized the first few episodes but felt the show regained its humor after "Don't Make Me Over"; IGN's Mike Drucker commented "At that point, we get some amazingly creative humor. It's almost like MacFarlane and gang decided they had thanked their fans enough and could return to what made the show successful in the first place." Media watchdog group the Parents Television Council, a frequent critic of the show, branded the episodes "North by North Quahog", "The Father, the Son, and the Holy Fonz", "Brian Sings and Swings", "Patriot Games", and "The Courtship of Stewie's Father" as "worst show of the week".
