= Jungle Love =

"Jungle Love" may refer to:

== Film and television ==
- "Jungle Love", an episode of season 2 of Tom and Jerry Tales
- "Jungle Love" (Family Guy), an episode of the animated television series Family Guy
- Jungle Love (film), a 1990 Hindi movie

== Music ==
- "Jungle Love" (Steve Miller Band song), a song by the Steve Miller Band from their 1977 album Book of Dreams
- "Jungle Love" (The Time song), a 1984 hit song by The Time
- "Jungle Love", a song by Krizz Kaliko from his 2008 debut album Vitiligo

== Other uses ==
- Jungle Love (festival), an arts and music festival in Queensland, Australia
