= Peter's Got Woods =

- Family Guy episode
- Episode no.: Season 4 Episode 11
- Directed by: Peter Shin; Chuck Klein; Zac Moncrief
- Written by: Danny Smith
- Production code: 4ACX14
- Original air date: September 11, 2005

Guest appearances
- Gary Cole as Principal Shepherd; Michael Dorn as Lt. Commander Worf; Susana Esteban as various characters; Jonathan Frakes as Commander Riker; Rachael MacFarlane as various characters; Patrick Stewart as Captain Picard; Fred Tatasciore as Arnold Palmer; Gabrielle Union as Shauna Parks; Wally Wingert as various characters; James Woods as himself; Jeff Bergman as Barney Rubble

Episode chronology
← Previous "Model Misbehavior"	Next → "Perfect Castaway"
- Family Guy season 4

"Peter's Got Woods" is the 11th episode and the mid-season premiere of the fourth season of the American animated television series Family Guy. It originally aired on Fox in the United States on September 11, 2005. In the episode, Brian offers to help an African-American woman change the name of James Woods Regional High School to Martin Luther King Jr., but his friendship with Peter becomes strained when Peter — who objects to the idea — recruits actor James Woods to sabotage the idea. James Woods would later return for revenge in the season 6 episode "Back to the Woods", and again for "Brian Griffin's House of Payne" and would eventually be killed off in the season 9 premiere episode "And Then There Were Fewer", but is later revealed to have survived his death in the season 10 episode "Tom Tucker: The Man and His Dream".

Directed by Peter Shin, Chuck Klein and Zac Moncrief and written by Danny Smith, the episode was initially scheduled for September 18, 2005, but was aired a week earlier due to Fox delaying the broadcast of the episode "Perfect Castaway" over sensitivity for Hurricane Katrina victims. It features guest performances from Gary Cole, Michael Dorn, Susana Esteban, Jonathan Frakes, Rachael MacFarlane, Patrick Stewart, Fred Tatasciore, Gabrielle Union, Wally Wingert, and James Woods, along with several recurring voice actors for the series. "Peter's Got Woods" was seen by approximately 9.22 million viewers during its original broadcast, and received mostly positive reviews from critics.

== Plot ==
After Lois asks Peter to go to a PTA meeting in her place, Peter asks Brian to go instead. Brian reluctantly attends, but he falls in love with one of Meg's teachers (played by Gabrielle Union) named Shauna Parks (a reference to Rosa Parks), who is black. They go out on a date, and Brian, attempting to win her over, suggests changing the name of James Woods Regional High School to honor Martin Luther King Jr.. Shauna likes Brian's idea, and the board holds a meeting to consider the name change. However, Peter, a James Woods fan, tries to protest the idea, and brings James Woods himself to the school during the name-changing to sabotage the effort.

When Woods permits them to change the name and the school, the board is impressed by his humility and reinstates the name to the James Woods Regional High School again. Brian gets furious with Peter for sabotaging the attempt to change the name of the high school and continues his denial of just wanting to impress his girlfriend because of her race, leading to Brian and Peter ending their friendship. To replace Brian as a friend, Peter becomes best friends with James Woods, and the two become inseparable.

Meanwhile, during a date at the movie theater, Brian is forced to admit to Shauna that he is still loyal to Peter. Shauna, however, hates Peter for sabotaging them and makes Brian choose between her or Peter. Brian chooses Peter and they break up. When Brian comes back home, he sees that Woods has replaced him; Woods sleeps on the bed with Peter and Lois, plays fetch with Peter, and both Peter and Woods ignore Brian.

Over time, Peter and Brian get bored without each other and they decide to reconcile. However, Peter notices that Woods has become obsessive with their friendship after he goes into a tirade at Peter for missing 5 minutes of a dinner. To rid themselves of Woods for good, Peter and Brian plant a trap baited with Reese's Pieces, ending in a crate held up by a stick tied to a rope. The plan works and Woods ends up trapped underneath the crate, which he is then locked up inside and taken to a storage warehouse where, according to Peter, he will later be examined by "top men".

== Production ==
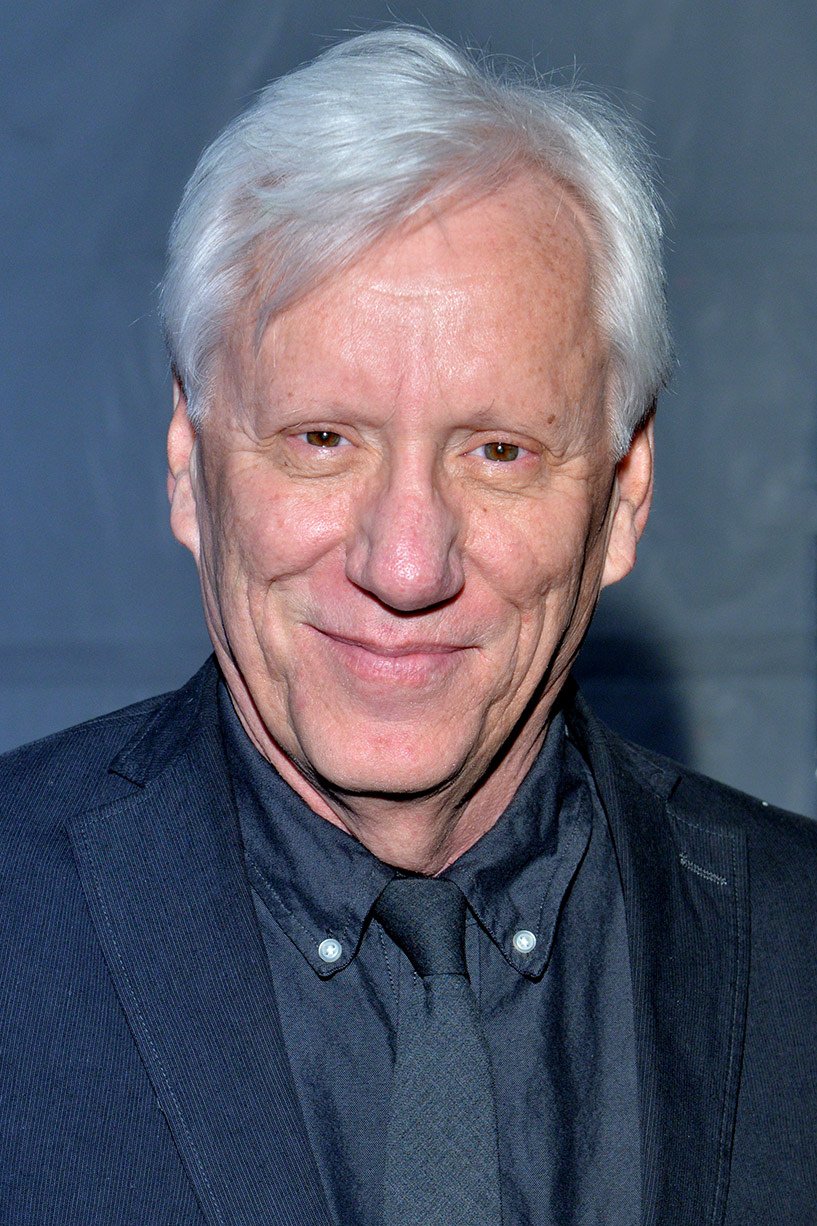
James Woods voiced himself

The episode was written by Danny Smith and was directed by Peter Shin, Chuck Klein, and Zac Moncrief before the conclusion of the fourth production season. The episode was initially scheduled for September 18, 2005, but was aired a week earlier due to FOX delaying the broadcast of the episode "Perfect Castaway" over sensitivity for Hurricane Katrina victims, as the episode made many jokes about tropical storms. Although most episodes of Family Guy are rated TV-14, "Peter's Got Woods" was rated TV-PG.

In addition to the regular cast, actors Gary Cole, Michael Dorn, Susana Esteban, Jonathan Frakes, Rachael MacFarlane, Patrick Stewart, Fred Tatasciore, Gabrielle Union, Wally Wingert, and James Woods. In a cutaway of Star Trek: The Next Generation, actors Patrick Stewart, Jonathan Frakes, and Michael Dorn reprised their roles of Captain Picard, Commander Riker, and Lt. Commander Worf respectively. Recurring guest voices include Alex Breckenridge, Mike Henry, John Viener, and Adam West, who portrays an exaggerated version of himself.

Marina Sirtis, also of Star Trek: The Next Generation, was also cast in the episode reprising her role of Counselor Deanna Troi. Her scene, however, was removed from the final cut and is only available on DVD bonus features.

== Cultural references ==
The episode contains some cultural references. In a scene, the toilet that Barney Rubble used in the Flintstones was used in a comparison. Stewie is shown playing Marco Polo with Helen Keller. In a cutaway of Star Trek: The Next Generation, Patrick Stewart, Jonathan Frakes and Michael Dorn are seen making fun of Worf (or rather, Worf's cranial ridges). During the episode Stewie reads The Da Vinci Code. Peter and James Woods sing a parody of the song "You Two" from the musical Chitty Chitty Bang Bang. In the scene where James Woods shows Peter his idea of "fun", he shows him a copy of Videodrome and points out his scenes in the movie. The phrase "tear down this wall" was parodied with Ronald Reagan punching a wall at a McDonald's repeatedly. Luring James Woods out with a trail of Reese's Pieces is a reference to E.T. the Extra-Terrestrial. The final scene with Peter repeating "top men" and Woods being stored away in a crate is a reference to Raiders of the Lost Ark. When Shauna introduces herself to Brian, the same a cappella doo-wop vocals that play in Ferris Bueller's Day Off when Jeanie Bueller (Jennifer Grey) introduces herself to a boy (Charlie Sheen) in police headquarters ("It's Jean but most guys call me Shauna") plays in the background.

== Reception ==
This episode had 9.22 and 9.72 million viewers on its first airing, and its lead-out, American Dad!, won the hour among the 18-49 demographic. Ryan J. Budke of AOL's blog TV Squad gave this episode a favorable review.
