= Brian the Bachelor =

- Family Guy episode
- Episode no.: Season 4 Episode 7
- Directed by: Dan Povenmire
- Written by: Mark Hentemann
- Production code: 4ACX10
- Original air date: June 26, 2005

Guest appearances
- Jessica Biel as Brooke; Kevin Michael Richardson as Doug; Michael Bell as AllStar Seaworthy; Nancy Cartwright as Daffney Gillfin; Drew Pinsky as The Dermatologist (credited as Dr. Drew); Joey Slotnick; Sebastian Siegel; John Erwin as He-Man

Episode chronology
← Previous "Petarded"	Next → "8 Simple Rules for Buying My Teenage Daughter"
- Family Guy season 4

"Brian the Bachelor" is the seventh episode from the fourth season of Family Guy. It originally broadcast on Fox on June 26, 2005, and was written by Mark Hentemann and directed by Dan Povenmire. The episode sees Brian becoming a contestant on The Bachelorette and falling in love with the bachelorette, only to be let down by her ignoring him off–camera. Meanwhile, Chris discovers his pimple, "Doug", can talk, and the pair cause mischief across the city. Overall, the episode was received with positive comments by critics and news sources.

== Plot ==
As Cleveland is still despondent from his upcoming divorce from Loretta, Peter takes him to audition for the upcoming season of The Bachelorette. Cleveland gets nervous at the audition and in an effort to calm him down, Peter removes Cleveland's clothes and then his own, only for the producers to see this. Brian explains to the producers that Peter was simply trying to help Cleveland, who is struggling from loneliness since his wife, and tries to convince them to give Cleveland a chance. However, they ask Brian to go on the show instead. Brian reluctantly accepts so he can take advantage of the free food and drinks.

While on the show, Brian ends up falling in love with the reality starlet, Brooke Roberts. Quagmire and Brian are the show's final two contestants, and after Brooke's disastrous visits to both their houses, Brian wins her heart and the final rose. However, when the cameras are turned off, Brooke wishes Brian good luck and says that it was nice "working with him", revealing the show really is scripted, as Brian initially suspected. Brian quickly becomes obsessed with Brooke and stalks her, leaving several messages on her answering machine, and even trying to serenade her outside her apartment, angering her into throwing her telephone at him. In the end, Brian feels upset about becoming the very thing he had mocked.

Meanwhile, Chris has a pimple on his face which he names "Doug". Lois worries about Chris, as Doug, who can talk, tells Chris to make some mischief. He goes to the Swansons' house and sets a bag of feces on fire on their porch, and writes "That's enough, John Mayer" in spray paint on the wall of the Quahog Mini-Mart. Lois sees Chris sneaking back into his room and tries to punish him, but Chris tells her that Doug said not to listen to her. An outraged Lois goes to Goldman's Pharmacy the next day to get some astringent to get rid of Doug, only to find there has been a break-in, and someone has destroyed Mort's entire stock of acne medication. Joe later comes to the Griffins, saying he has proof that it was Chris who vandalized, broke into Goldman's Pharmacy and stole Mort's acne medication. Having had enough of Doug's bad influence and terrified of Doug's threats to kill him, Chris finally goes to the dermatology clinic to get him removed. A struggle ensues as Doug tries to shoot Chris in the brain, but Chris manages to overpower him and uses cortisone on Doug, finally neutralizing him.

== Production ==
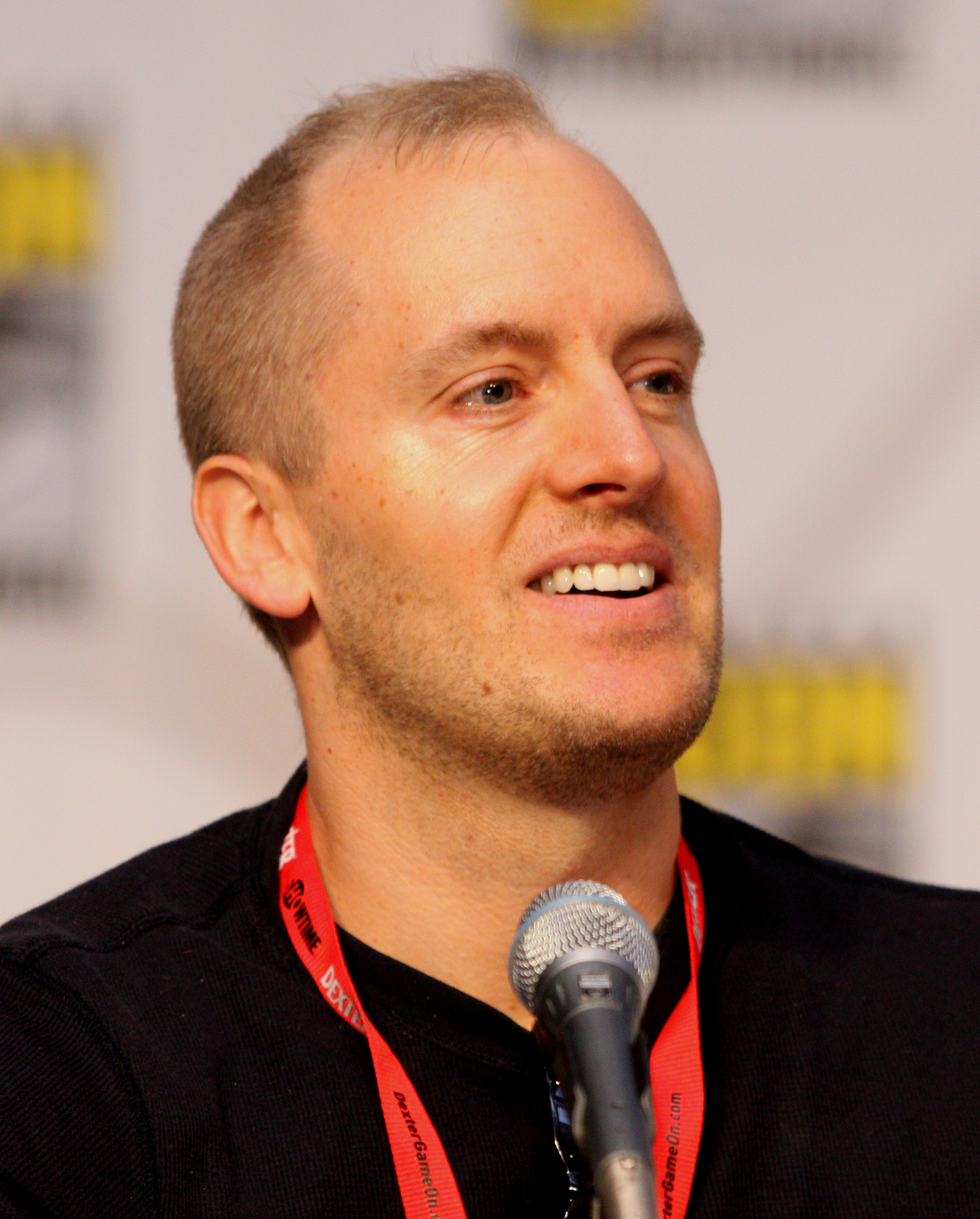
Mark Hentemann wrote the episode.

When this episode was being produced, The Bachelorette was a bigger and more prolific program than when the episode was originally broadcast. In addition, ABC was not doing very well at the time of this episode's production. The production staff encountered some trouble when deciding what Peter would be doing in the lobby with Cleveland during his Bachelorette audition; although the series could never come up with ideas they deemed to be suitable, they intended for Peter to put his buttocks in an aquarium tank in order to embarrass Cleveland and make him want to leave. This scene was not used, and the production staff used a scene of Peter putting his naked buttocks on Cleveland's naked buttocks; they also shortened this more detailed version and used the less-detailed current version.

During Cleveland's audition for The Bachelorette, an unused scene was created that showed both Peter and Cleveland naked, with Peter sitting on top of Cleveland and bouncing up and down, as if he and Cleveland were engaging in anal sex, but broadcasting standards prohibited the scene. Family Guy creator Seth MacFarlane comments in the DVD commentary that Walter Murphy, who composes much of the music for Family Guy, goes back and forth from standard Family Guy music to Bachelorette-style music during the episode. During the sequence where Brian and Brooke are talking in the barn, originally, the two horses in the background were intended to begin mating, but the sketch was never used. Voice actors Nancy Cartwright and Michael Bell reprise their roles as Allstar Seaworthy and Daffney Gillfin for the Snorks cutaway. The name of Quagmire's cat was originally "Pussy", but broadcasting standards objected. The episode was originally to feature a sequence showing Chris breaking entry into Goldman's Pharmacy in order to destroy the acne medication wearing a Balaclava, but the scene was never shown. The promo features Quagmire in a limo finding the girl of his dreams, but the scene was also cut. This is John Erwin's final acting credit before his retirement in 2010 and passing on December 20, 2024.

== Cultural references ==
According to the commentary from the DVD, Chris' talking pimple is a reference to Little Shop of Horrors. Chris shown waving his shirt above his head and being watched by Herbert through the window is a reference to 1978 comedy film National Lampoon's Animal House. He-Man from the Masters of the Universe media franchise is shown at the ranch during Brian's time on The Bachelorette. Chris mentions the Snorks to his zit in the scene where he spray paints the mini mart. The sequence of Peter and Lois at Mort Goldman's pharmacy after the store vandalism is a reference to Fast Times at Ridgemont High, with Jeff Spicoli coming out of the restroom. Brian's phone call to Brooke after she selects him as a final contestant makes references to the Billy Vera song At This Moment. Disney CEO Michael Eisner is featured after Brooke reveals that "it's just TV". He comes out to give Brian a "consolation prize", which turns out to be a bill for the Bachelorette mansion.

== Reception ==
As the most-watched Fox program that night, this episode had an audience of 7.29 million.

In a positive review of the episode in Family Guy, Volume 3, Dan MacIntosh of PopMatters praised the performance of Chris:

"Chris' best scenes occur during "Brian the Bachelor", where he is shown developing an unlikely friendship with one of his facial zits."

By contrast, Family Guy, Volume 3, included a negative review by Francis Rizzo III (aka Turdboy) of DVD Talk:

"Among the more frustrating trends in the series is its willingness to stretch an unfunny joke to its very limits. When Stewie berated Brian for not finishing his novel for nearly two minutes, not once, but twice, in "Brian the Bachelor", it tested my patience severely, and didn't even make me smile."
