= North by North Quahog =

- Family Guy episode
- The promo image, parodying a scene from North by Northwest.
- Episode no.: Season 4 Episode 1
- Directed by: Peter Shin
- Written by: Seth MacFarlane
- Production code: 4ACX01
- Original air date: May 1, 2005

Guest appearances
- Don LaFontaine as himself; Hunter Gomez as Pinocchio; Bill Ratner as Flint; André Sogliuzzo as Mel Gibson

Episode chronology
← Previous "When You Wish Upon a Weinstein"	Next → "Fast Times at Buddy Cianci Jr. High"
- Family Guy season 4

"North by North Quahog" is the fourth season premiere of the animated television series Family Guy. It originally aired on the Fox network in the United States on May 1, 2005, though it had premiered three days earlier at a special screening at the University of Vermont, Burlington. In the episode, Peter and Lois go on a second honeymoon to rekindle their marriage, but are chased by Mel Gibson after Peter steals the sequel to The Passion of the Christ from Gibson's private hotel room. Meanwhile, Brian and Stewie take care of Chris and Meg at home.

Family Guy had been cancelled in 2002 due to low ratings, but was revived by Fox in 2005 after reruns on Adult Swim became the cable network's most watched program, and more than three million DVDs of the show were sold. Written by the series creator Seth MacFarlane and directed by Peter Shin, much of the plot and many of the technical aspects of the episode, as well as the title, are direct parodies of the 1959 Alfred Hitchcock classic movie North by Northwest; in addition, the episode makes use of Bernard Herrmann's theme music from that film. The episode contains many cultural references; in the cold opening, Peter lists 29 shows that were canceled by Fox after very short runs (several after Family Guy was canceled) and says that if all of those shows were to be canceled, they might have a chance at returning.

Critical responses to "North by North Quahog" were mostly positive, with the opening sequence being praised in particular. The episode was watched by nearly 12 million viewers and received a Primetime Emmy Award nomination for Outstanding Animated Program (for Programming Less Than One Hour). Shin won an Annie Award for Directing in an Animated Television Production for this episode.

== Plot ==
In a cold open, Peter breaks the fourth wall by telling his family that their show has ended. He then lists 29 Fox shows that coincided with Family Guy's initial run and were canceled after one season (several of which aired between the show's cancellation and revival), and says that if all of those shows were to fail, they might have a chance at returning.

Peter is watching The Passion of the Christ and imagines that if he were Jesus, he would tell the Roman centurion to stop whipping him. Later, as Peter and Lois are having sex, she yells out George Clooney's name, so Peter realizes that she is imagining him as Clooney to maintain her libido. Lois and Peter decide to take a second honeymoon to enliven their marriage, and leave their dog Brian to take care of their children Stewie, Chris, and Meg. Brian is unable to control the children, but Stewie offers to help (in exchange for Brian changing his diaper) and together they manage the home. The pair chaperone a dance at Chris's school, during which the school principal catches Chris in the boys' restroom with vodka that belongs to his classmate Jake Tucker. Although Brian and Stewie punish Chris by grounding him, they try to clear his name. Jake's father Tom refuses to believe Brian and Stewie, so they resort to planting cocaine in Jake's locker, and Jake is sentenced to community service.

On the way to their vacation spot, Lois falls asleep. Unfortunately, Peter doesn't pay attention to the road, deciding instead to read a comic book while driving, and crashes the car into a tree. They are forced to spend their entire honeymoon money on car repairs and are about to return home when Peter discovers that actor/director Mel Gibson has a private suite at a luxurious hotel nearby, "which he barely uses". He and Lois then go to the hotel, where Peter poses as Gibson to gain access to his room. When Lois yells out Gibson's name during intercourse, Peter, again, decides to return home. As the two are about to leave, Peter accidentally stumbles upon Gibson's private screening room and discovers a sequel to The Passion of the Christ entitled The Passion of the Christ 2: Crucify This, which depicts Jesus as a crime fighting vigilante in a modern setting. To spare the world from more “Jesus mumbo jumbo”, Peter steals the film. However, when they leave the hotel, they are noticed by two priests, Gibson's associates, who were there to collect the film.

Pursued by the priests in a car chase that leads them through a shopping mall, Lois and Peter escape from the priests and drive to a cornfield where Peter buries the film. While he is doing so, the priests fly down in a crop-duster and kidnap Lois. Peter is then given a message telling him that if he does not return the film to Gibson at his estate on top of Mount Rushmore, his wife will be killed. Peter arrives at the house and gives Gibson a film can. As Peter and Lois are about to leave, Gibson discovers that the film has been replaced with dog feces, leading to a chase on the face of the mountain. While being chased, Lois slips but hangs on to George Washington's lips. Peter grabs her and, while being held at gunpoint, he jokes a location about the film and points to the other side of the monument. Gibson follows Peter's direction and falls off the edge (Peter claims that Christians don't believe in gravity) as Peter pulls Lois to safety. Upon climbing back to the top of the mountain, the two have sexual intercourse there, improving their marriage.

== Production and development ==
In 2002, Family Guy was canceled after three seasons due to low ratings. The show was first canceled after the 1999–2000 season, but following a last-minute reprieve, it returned for a third season in 2001. The second cancellation on May 16, 2002, just after Fox's annual revealing of their Fall lineup (in which Family Guy was absent) was official and it was never going to come back. Fox tried to sell rights for reruns of the show, but it was hard to find networks that were interested; Cartoon Network eventually bought the rights, "basically for free", according to the president of 20th Century Fox Television Production. When the reruns were shown on Cartoon Network's Adult Swim in 2003, Family Guy became Adult Swim's most-watched show with an average 1.9 million viewers an episode. Following Family Guy's high ratings on Adult Swim, the first season was released on DVD in April 2003. Sales of the DVD set reached 2.2 million copies, becoming the best-selling television DVD of 2003 and the second highest-selling television DVD ever, behind the first season of Comedy Central's Chappelle's Show. The second season DVD release also sold more than a million copies. The show's popularity in both DVD sales and reruns rekindled Fox's interest in it. They ordered 35 new episodes in 2004, marking the first revival of a television show based on DVD sales. Fox president Gail Berman said that it was one of her most difficult decisions to cancel the show, and was therefore happy it would return. The network also began production of a film based on the series.

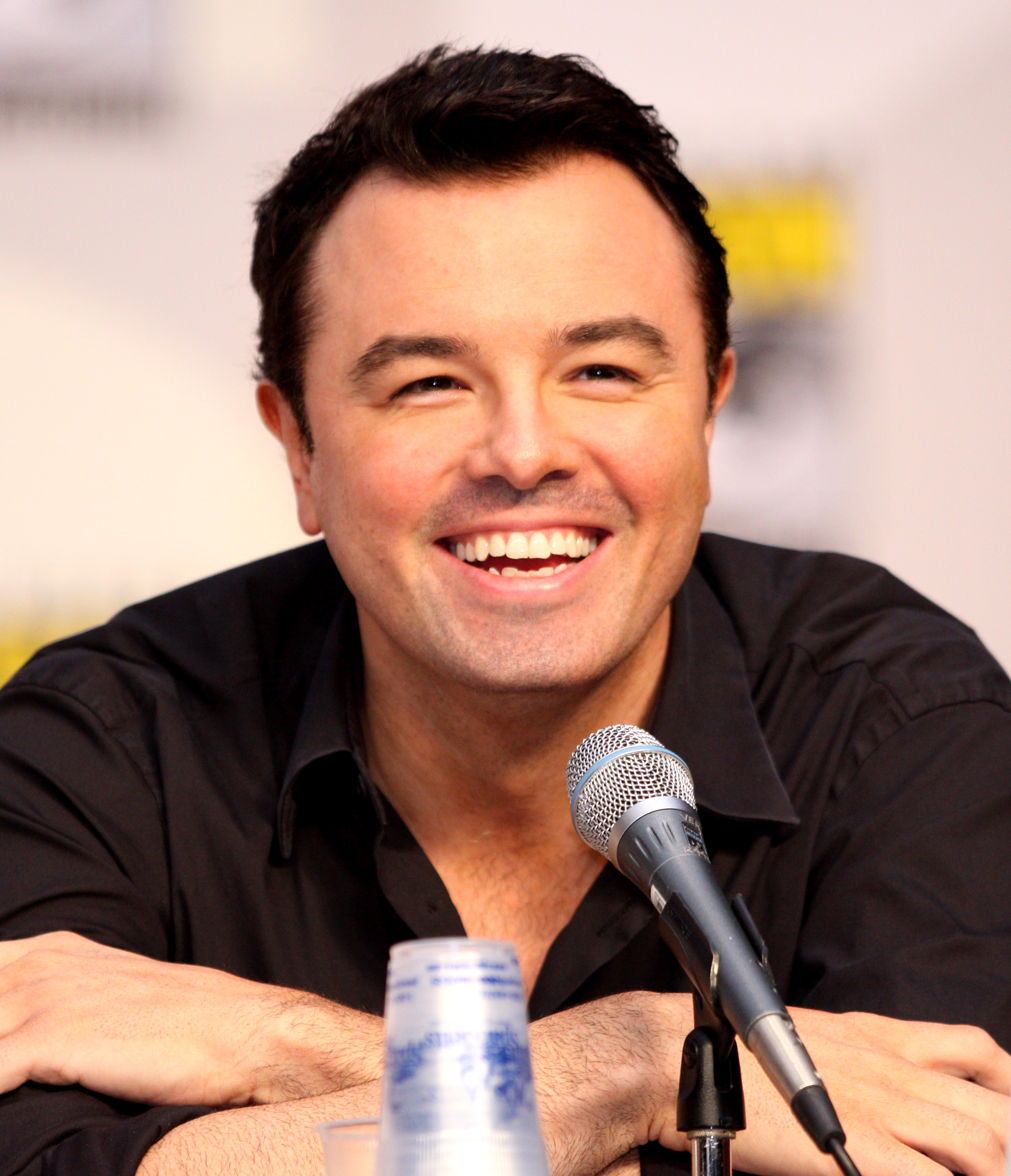
Creator Seth MacFarlane wrote the episode.

"North by North Quahog" was the first episode to be broadcast after the show's cancellation. It was written by MacFarlane and directed by Peter Shin, both of whom also wrote and directed the pilot together. MacFarlane believed the show's three-year hiatus was beneficial because animated shows do not normally have hiatuses, and towards the end of their seasons "you see a lot more sex jokes and (bodily function) jokes and signs of a fatigued staff that their brains are just fried". With "North by North Quahog", the writing staff tried to keep the show "exactly as it was" before its cancellation, and did not "have the desire to make it any slicker" than it already was. Walter Murphy, who had composed music for the show before its cancellation, returned to compose the music for "North by North Quahog". Murphy and the orchestra recorded an arrangement of Bernard Herrmann's score from North by Northwest, a film referenced multiple times in the episode.

Fox had ordered five episode scripts at the end of the third season; these episodes had been written but not produced. One of these scripts was adapted into "North by North Quahog". The original script featured Star Wars character Boba Fett, and later actor, writer and producer Aaron Spelling, but the release of the iconic film The Passion of the Christ inspired the writers to incorporate Mel Gibson into the episode. Multiple endings were written, including one in which Death comes for Gibson. During production, an episode of South Park was released entitled "The Passion of the Jew" that also featured Gibson as a prominent character. This gave the Family Guy writers pause, fearing accusations "that we had ripped them off."

Three days before the episode debuted on television, it was screened at the University of Vermont (UVM) in Burlington, accompanied by an hour-long question-and-answer session with MacFarlane. The UVM's special screening of the episode was attended by 1,700 people. As promotion for the show, and to, as Newman described, "expand interest in the show beyond its die hard fans", Fox organized four Family Guy Live! performances, which featured cast members reading old episodes aloud; "North by North Quahog" was also previewed. In addition, the cast performed musical numbers from the Family Guy Live in Vegas comedy album. The stage shows were an extension of a performance by the cast during the 2004 Montreal Comedy Festival. The Family Guy Live! performances, which took place in Los Angeles and New York, sold out and were attended by around 1,200 people each.

== Cultural references ==
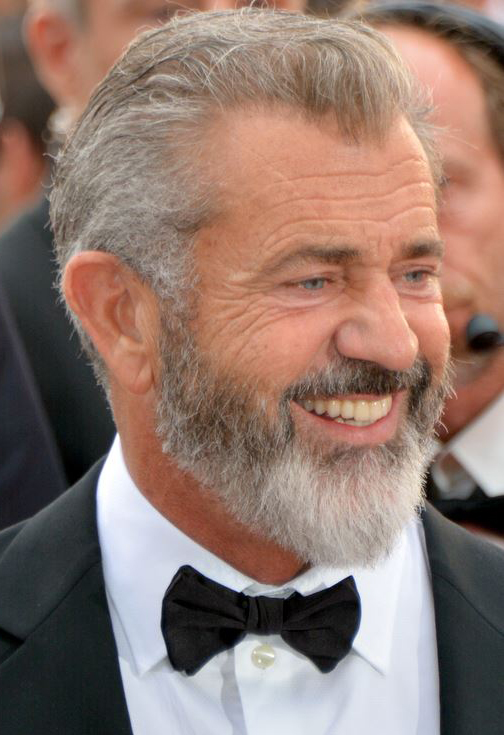
Actor Mel Gibson is prominently featured as a character in the episode

The episode opens with Peter telling the rest of the family that Family Guy has been cancelled. He lists the following 29 shows (in chronological order), that he says Fox has to make room for: Dark Angel (lasted for two seasons and gained a cult following), Titus (though Titus was facing cancellation the same year Family Guy was), Undeclared, Action, That '80s Show, Wonderfalls, Fastlane, Andy Richter Controls the Universe, Skin, Girls Club, Cracking Up, The Pitts (which MacFarlane worked on following Family Guy's cancellation), Firefly, Get Real, FreakyLinks, Wanda at Large, Costello (which premiered and was cancelled before Family Guy had ever aired), The Lone Gunmen, A Minute with Stan Hooper, Normal, Ohio, Pasadena, Harsh Realm, Keen Eddie, The $treet, The American Embassy, Cedric the Entertainer Presents, The Tick, Luis, and Greg the Bunny (he glances at Chris, voiced by Seth Green, who was a cast member on that show). Lois asks whether there is any hope, to which Peter replies that if all these shows are canceled they might have a chance, the joke being all these shows had indeed already been canceled by Fox. The New York Times reported that, during the first Family Guy Live! performance, "the longer [the list] went, the louder the laughs from the Town Hall crowd [became]".

Australian-American actor Mel Gibson is prominently featured in the episode; his voice was impersonated by André Sogliuzzo. Gibson directed the film The Passion of the Christ (2004) and, in the episode, is seen making a sequel entitled Passion of the Christ 2: Crucify This. The fictional sequel is a combination of The Passion of the Christ and Rush Hour (1998), and stars Chris Tucker, who starred in Rush Hour, and Jim Caviezel who portrayed Jesus in The Passion of the Christ.

Besides the title, the episode contains several references to Alfred Hitchcock's 1959 film North by Northwest, including the scene where Lois is kidnapped by Gibson's associates, the two priests flying a crop-duster who chase Peter through a cornfield, the final face-off between Peter, Lois and Gibson that takes place on Mount Rushmore, and even its theme music as originally composed by Bernard Hermann.

As Peter and Lois are driving to Cape Cod for their second honeymoon, Peter is reading a Jughead comic book and their car crashes. The fictional Park Barrington Hotel, where Peter and Lois steal Gibson's film, is located in Manhattan. The car chase scene through a shopping mall is a recreation of a scene from the 1980 comedy film The Blues Brothers. To stop Meg and Chris from fighting, Brian reads to them from one of the few books Peter owns, a novelization of the 1980 film Caddyshack and quotes a line by Chevy Chase's character, Ty Webb.

The episode contains a number of other cultural references. When Peter and Lois enter their motel room and find a hooker on the bed, Peter warns Lois to stay perfectly still, as the prostitute's vision is based on movement. This is a reference to a scene in the movie Jurassic Park (1993) in which Dr. Grant gives this warning in reference to a Tyrannosaurus Rex. Pinocchio appears in a cutaway gag, in which Geppetto bends over and deliberately sets Pinocchio up to tell a lie in an attempt to emulate anal sex. This was based on a joke MacFarlane's mother had told her friends when he was a child. Lois yells out George Clooney's name when she and Peter are having sex. The 1950s sitcom The Honeymooners is also referenced when a fictional episode of the sitcom is shown in which Ralph Kramden, the show's main character, hits his wife, Alice, something he would only threaten to do on the show. Meg watches an episode of the CBS sitcom Two and a Half Men, which shows three men in a living room, one of whom is cut in half at the waist and screaming in agony, the other two standing over him and screaming in horror. Fictional army soldier Flint of G.I. Joe: A Real American Hero appears briefly after Chris is caught drinking vodka, and educates the children on drinking and informs them that "knowing is half the battle". Flint's voice was provided by Bill Ratner, the actor who had voiced the character in the G.I. Joe television series. According to Seth Green, who voices Chris, the reason the Family Guy cast members did not voice Flint themselves is because if you have the original actor providing the voice "you take it with a little bit more gravitas".

== Reception ==
"MacFarlane penned the premiere segment, whose storyline largely involves Peter and Lois heading off on a second honeymoon to bring the passion back to a marriage that leaves her fantasizing about George Clooney during sex. As if that isn't offensive enough there's also copulation that occurs atop the carved mountain Mount Rushmore icons. It's funny stuff, sometimes too smugly self-aware of its own outrageousness. But hey, you can bet the DVD is gonna be huge."

— Ray Richmond, The Hollywood Reporter.

"North by North Quahog" was broadcast on May 1, 2005, as part of an animated television night on Fox, was preceded by two episodes of The Simpsons (including the show's 350th episode), and was followed by the premiere of MacFarlane's new show, American Dad!. It ranked #25 for the week, and was watched by 11.85 million viewers, higher than both The Simpsons and American Dad. The episode's ratings were Family Guy's highest ratings since the airing of the season one episode "Brian: Portrait of a Dog". Family Guy was the week's highest-rated show among teens and men in the 18 to 34 demographic, and more than doubled Fox's average in its timeslot. The episode's first broadcast in Canada on Global was watched by 1.27 million viewers, making it fourth for the week it was broadcast, behind CSI: Crime Scene Investigation, CSI: Miami and Canadian Idol.

The reactions of television critics to "North by North Quahog" were mostly positive. In a simultaneous review of the two episodes of The Simpsons that preceded this episode and the American Dad! pilot, Chase Squires of the St. Petersburg Times stated that "North by North Quahog" "score[d] the highest". Multimedia news and reviews website IGN was pleased to see Stewie and Brian get more screen time as a duo, something they thought had always been one of the show's biggest strengths. IGN placed Peter's idea to pose as Mel Gibson and steal Passion of the Christ 2 in 9th place on their list of "Peter Griffin's Top 10 Craziest Ideas". Matthew Gilbert of The Boston Globe commented that the episode's material "would wear thin after a while if the character's weren't as distinct and endearing as they are, most notably Stewie, the wrathful infant."

Critics reacted positively to the opening sequence; in his review of the episode, Mark McGuire of The Times Union wrote: "the first minute or so of the resurrected Family Guy ranks among the funniest 60 seconds I've seen so far this season." Variety critic Brian Lowry considered the opening sequence to be the best part of the episode. M. Keith Booker, author of the book Drawn to Television: Primetime Television from The Flintstones to Family Guy, called the opening sequence an "in-your-face, I-told-you-so rejoinder to the Fox brass [...] followed by one of the most outrageous Family Guy episodes ever".

However, the episode also garnered negative responses. Melanie McFarland of the Seattle Post-Intelligencer stated that "Three years off the air has not made the Family Guy team that much more creative". Kevin Wong of PopMatters thought the episode made fun of easy targets such as Gibson and The Passion of The Christ, although he felt Family Guy regained "its admirable mix of niche nostalgia and hysterical characterizations" after the first two episodes of the new season. Though Alex Strachan, critic for The Montreal Gazette, praised the opening sequence, he felt "it's all downhill from there". Bill Brioux of the Toronto Star considered the show to be similar to The Simpsons. Media watchdog group the Parents Television Council, a frequent critic of the show, branded the episode the "worst show of the week".

"North by North Quahog" was nominated for a Primetime Emmy Award for Outstanding Animated Program (for Programming Less Than One Hour), the eventual recipient of the award being South Park episode "Best Friends Forever". Peter Shin, director of the episode, won the Annie Award for Best Directing in an Animated Television Production. Fellow Family Guy director Dan Povenmire, was nominated for the same award for directing "PTV".
