= PTV (Family Guy) =

- Family Guy episode
- Promotional image of Federal Communications Commission officials outside the Griffins' shower, censoring Peter’s genitalia with a black censor bar, much to his dislike.
- Episode no.: Season 4 Episode 14
- Directed by: Dan Povenmire
- Written by: Alec Sulkin; Wellesley Wild
- Production code: 4ACX17
- Original air date: November 6, 2005

Guest appearances
- Gary Cole as Mike Brady; Keith Ferguson as Cobra Commander; Ralph Garman as FCC Member/Officer Reeses; Maurice LaMarche as Bob Hope; Hunter Gomez; Wally Wingert as FCC Member; Stacey Scowley; John Viener as Apache Chief/FCC Member

Episode chronology
← Previous "Jungle Love"	Next → "Brian Goes Back to College"
- Family Guy season 4

"PTV" is the fourteenth episode in the fourth season of the American animated television series Family Guy. It originally aired on the Fox network in the United States on November 6, 2005. The episode sees the Federal Communications Commission (FCC) censor the shows on television after a controversial wardrobe malfunction at the Emmy Awards. Peter starts to create his own TV network which he calls PTV, broadcasting classic shows unedited and uncut, as well as original programming. PTV is a big success, and Stewie and Brian join him, creating shows for the network. Lois calls the FCC to close PTV as she is concerned about how children will be influenced by Peter's programming. Not only do the FCC close down the network, but they also start censoring the citizens of Quahog, so the Griffin family takes a road trip to Washington, D.C., and convinces Congress to have the FCC's rules lifted.

The episode was written by Alec Sulkin and Wellesley Wild and was directed by Dan Povenmire. The episode is a response to the FCC's measures to the Super Bowl XXXVIII halftime show controversy. Show creator Seth MacFarlane commented that the episode's plot was inspired by the rage of the Family Guy crew towards the strict rules that the FCC made after the controversy. The episode contains a sequence of various scenes from different previous episodes. Many of the scenes were cut from the episodes they were originally made for owing to Fox's internal censors. With a Nielsen rating of 4.4, "PTV" was the nineteenth most-watched episode of the week in which it was broadcast. The episode gained mostly positive responses from critics, and received a Primetime Emmy Award nomination for Outstanding Animated Program (for Programming Less Than One Hour) as well as an Annie Award nomination for directing.

== Plot ==
In a cold open unconnected to the remainder of the episode (which serves as an extended parody of the opening scenes from The Naked Gun), Stewie prevents Osama bin Laden from sending a hostile message to the United States by attacking him and beating several of his henchmen. He rides off on his Big Wheel, cycling through scenes from various films and video games before eventually arriving at his house, where he almost runs over Homer Simpson (itself a reference to The Simpsons opening sequence). Upon seeing Homer on the ground, Peter asks "Who the hell is that?"

In the episode itself, Peter awakens Lois by noisily installing a red carpet in their bedroom, anticipating watching the Emmy Awards, but Lois forces him to go to Meg's school play (which resembles the musical Godspell) instead. After David Hyde Pierce's wardrobe malfunction during the ceremony, the FCC, led by Cobra Commander, receives an insignificant volume of phone calls concerning the incident, and decides to censor any content from television that could be even slightly harmful to viewers. The censorship is applied to such content as Chrissy Snow's cleavage from Three's Company, Ralph Kramden's threats of spousal abuse on The Honeymooners and even Dick Van Dyke's name. Peter is outraged, and on advice from Tom Tucker, starts his own TV network, PTV, on which he broadcasts classic shows unedited. He also includes original programming, such as Brian and Stewie's sitcom Cheeky Bastard, Quagmire's Midnight Q, Dogs Humping, and The Peter Griffin Sideboob Hour.

PTV is successful, but Lois is furious about everyone's interest in perverted TV, as she is concerned over how children will be influenced by Peter's programming (in the DVD release, Peter and Cleveland, in a parody of Jackass, defecate on top of Lois' car; the theme to the Jackass parody would later be used in the episode "The Man with Two Brians" while the Griffins are actually watching Jackass). Brian comes to Peter's defense by arguing that parents and legal guardians are the ones who should ultimately take responsibility for what their kids watch—he also notes that there are much worse influences for kids besides what they see in pop culture. Regardless, Lois calls the FCC to have PTV switched off for good. This prompts Peter, along with Brian and Stewie, to perform an elaborate musical number lampooning the FCC's regulations. Although impressed with the song, the arriving FCC representatives shut down PTV. When Peter tells them that they cannot prevent people from being who they are even after they censor television, they decide to take on the challenge.

The representatives start to censor any foul language and inappropriate behavior in Quahog, ruining moments of privacy: a "censor's bar" is pulled over Peter's genitals by FCC employees as he leaves the shower, all expletives are drowned out with an air horn, audible farts are overdubbed with Steven Wright punchlines, and Mayor Adam West is cautioned for shaking his penis more than once after using a urinal. Everyone in Quahog is outraged by this change except for Lois, who believes that the citizens need a lesson in decency. However, she discovers that the FCC's guidelines ultimately prevent her and Peter from having sex. Realizing the consequences of her actions and that they were self-righteous as she haven't sex in two weeks, Lois apologizes to Peter and admits that he was right all along (prompting him to unveil a banner reading "Peter's Right!" which he had set up 15 years earlier in preparation for such an event; a clown was also supposed to appear, but he ended up dying and being reduced to a skeleton).

They lobby Congress to have the FCC's rulings lifted; at first they disagree due to their strong support of the FCC, but they relent when Peter retorts by making them realize the resemblance of many Washington buildings to various private parts, including the Washington Monument to a penis, the Capitol Building to a breast and The Pentagon to an anus. With the oppression of the FCC finally over, Lois congratulates Peter, and the family watches an episode of The Brady Bunch that prominently features toilet humor.

== Production ==
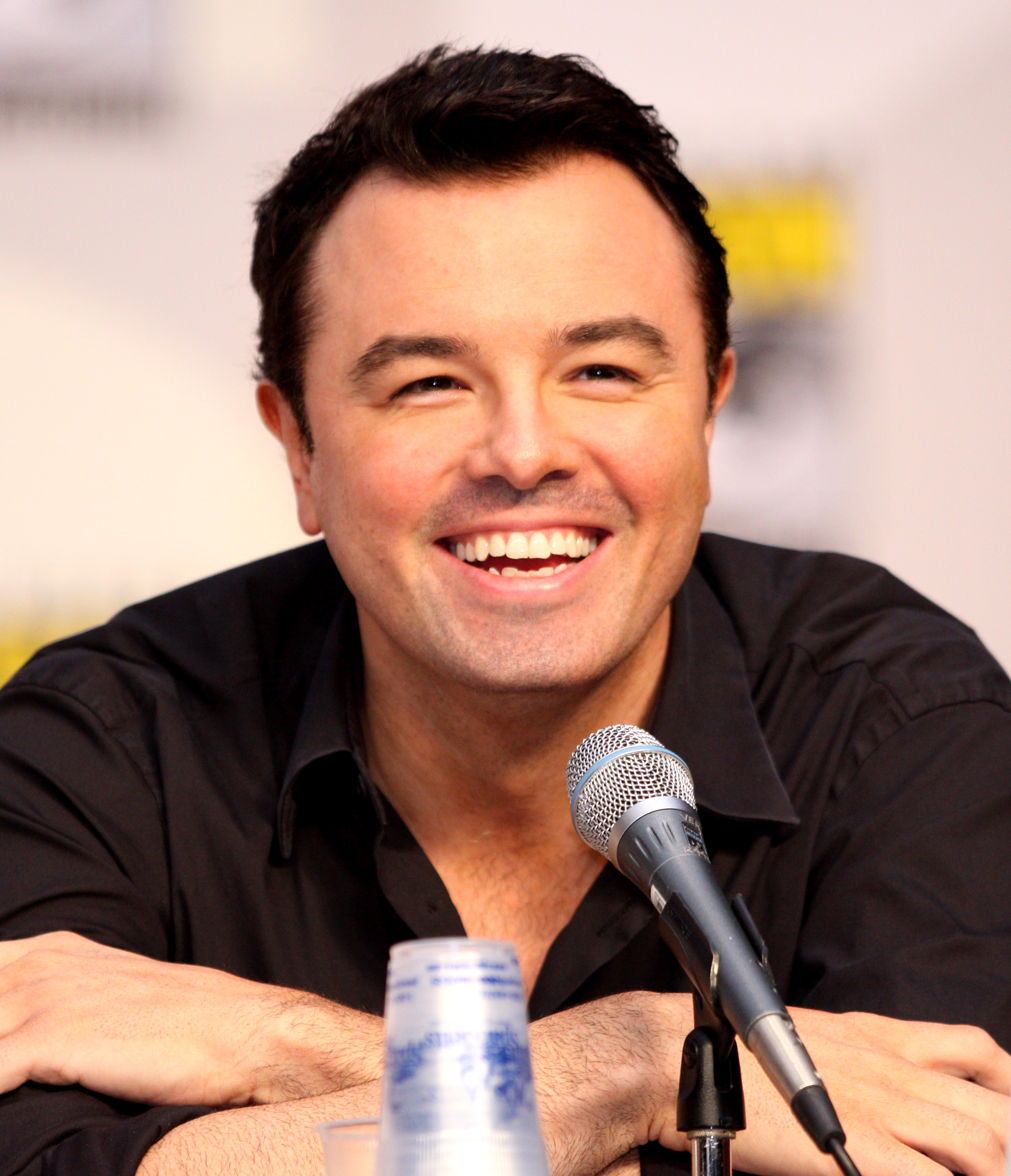
Show creator Seth MacFarlane stated that the plot of the episode was a response to the FCC's reaction to the Super Bowl XXXVIII halftime show controversy.

The episode was co-written by Alec Sulkin and Wellesley Wild. Patrick Meighan, John Viener, Cherry Chevapravatdumrong, Tom Devanney and Kirker Butler acted as staff writers in the episode. The plot of "PTV" is a parody of the FCC's measures after Janet Jackson's wardrobe malfunction during the Super Bowl XXXVIII halftime show. In an interview, MacFarlane was asked where the inspiration to the episode's plot came from, in his response he commented that "In the case of 'PTV' it came out of rage. Rage over all the crap we have to deal with since Janet Jackson showed her 67 year old boob."

The episode was directed by Dan Povenmire, while Peter Shin contributed as supervising director. Various scenes in "PTV" were taken out of the episode due to Fox's internal censors. As the writers worked on the episode the producers ended up, as the Chicago Tribune describes it, "horse trading" with Fox, removing a body-part reference in exchange for a dirty word. While the writing staff of the show was disappointed with the number of scenes that were removed from the episode, they were happy with the final result. The opening sequence, of which Family Guy's creator Seth MacFarlane was particularly proud, was added into the episode after the producers discovered the episode ran three minutes short. The episode contained a montage which showcased the most bawdy moments of the previous seasons; Povenmire recalled the sequence; about it he stated that "I just found those off the DVD and digitized them and edited them in. Basically because I didn't want to draw all those things! I found the most disgusting images from the first three seasons. And we actually got network notes on two of them saying, 'You're gonna have to cut that!' And I went, 'This has been on the air! And I'm only showing 8 frames of it!' And it turns out we cut them now when they're on the air. So apropos for the FCC episode."

"PTV" and the thirteen other episodes from Family Guy's fourth season were released on a three-disc DVD set in the United States, in Europe, and in Australia on November 16, 2006, April 24, 2006, and May 29, 2006, respectively. The DVDs included brief audio commentaries by Seth MacFarlane, various crew and cast members from several episodes, a collection of deleted scenes, and a special mini-feature that shows director Peter Shin drawing Stewie. The episode was shown in the William S. Paley Television Festival, with which various writers, directors and voice actors of the show assisted.

All the main Family Guy cast members lent their voices to the episode, along with semi-regulars Lori Alan, Adam West, Ralph Garman, Gary Cole and Phil LaMarr. Staff writers Chris Sheridan and John Viener also had minor speaking roles. Guest appearances included voice actors Keith Ferguson, Maurice LaMarche, Hunter Gomez, Wally Wingert, and actress Stacey Scowley. Like with most episodes, the music in the episode was composed by Walter Murphy, including the song titled "The Freaking FCC", with additional music edited by Ron Jones, who also composed for other episodes until 2014.

== Cultural references ==
"PTV" contained various cultural references. "PTV" has been described as a satire on the "government's ever-increasing reach into our living rooms" by Television Watch executive director Jim Dyke. The opening sequence in which Stewie beats up members of Al-Qaeda and then rides his tricycle through various movie and game scenes is a reference to the opening sequence of Bobby's World and The Naked Gun series of films. The movies from which animated scenes are shown are The Wizard of Oz, Ben-Hur, The Shining, and The Sound of Music. Actual footage of The Empire Strikes Back and the video game Doom were also used.

The FCC censors various television shows, such as Ralph Kramden's threats of physical violence in The Honeymooners, two-thirds of Dick Van Dyke's name in The Dick Van Dyke Show ("dick" and "dyke" being slang terms for penis and lesbian, respectively), Archie Bunker and wife Edith dressed as Ku Klux Klan members from All in the Family, John-Boy being caught masturbating in The Waltons and Chrissy Snow's bikini in a Three's Company episode. Former Frasier cast member David Hyde Pierce was briefly mentioned in the episode. The extreme reaction of the FCC to Pierce's incident is a parody of the FCC's reaction to Janet Jackson's "wardrobe malfunction" during Super Bowl XXXVIII. Bob Hope, Wile E. Coyote, Ozzy Osbourne, Cobra Commander, Apache Chief, George W. Bush and Homer Simpson made appearances in cutaway gags. Terrorist Osama bin Laden was depicted prominently in the opening sequence. Stewie and bin Laden's sword fight has the same choreography as Yoda and Count Dooku's fight in the film Star Wars: Episode II – Attack of the Clones. In the uncensored version, one of PTV's shows, "Douchebags" is a parody of the MTV's Jackass, both the TV show and its series of films. The end of the episode is a parody to the ending of The Brady Bunch.

== Reception ==
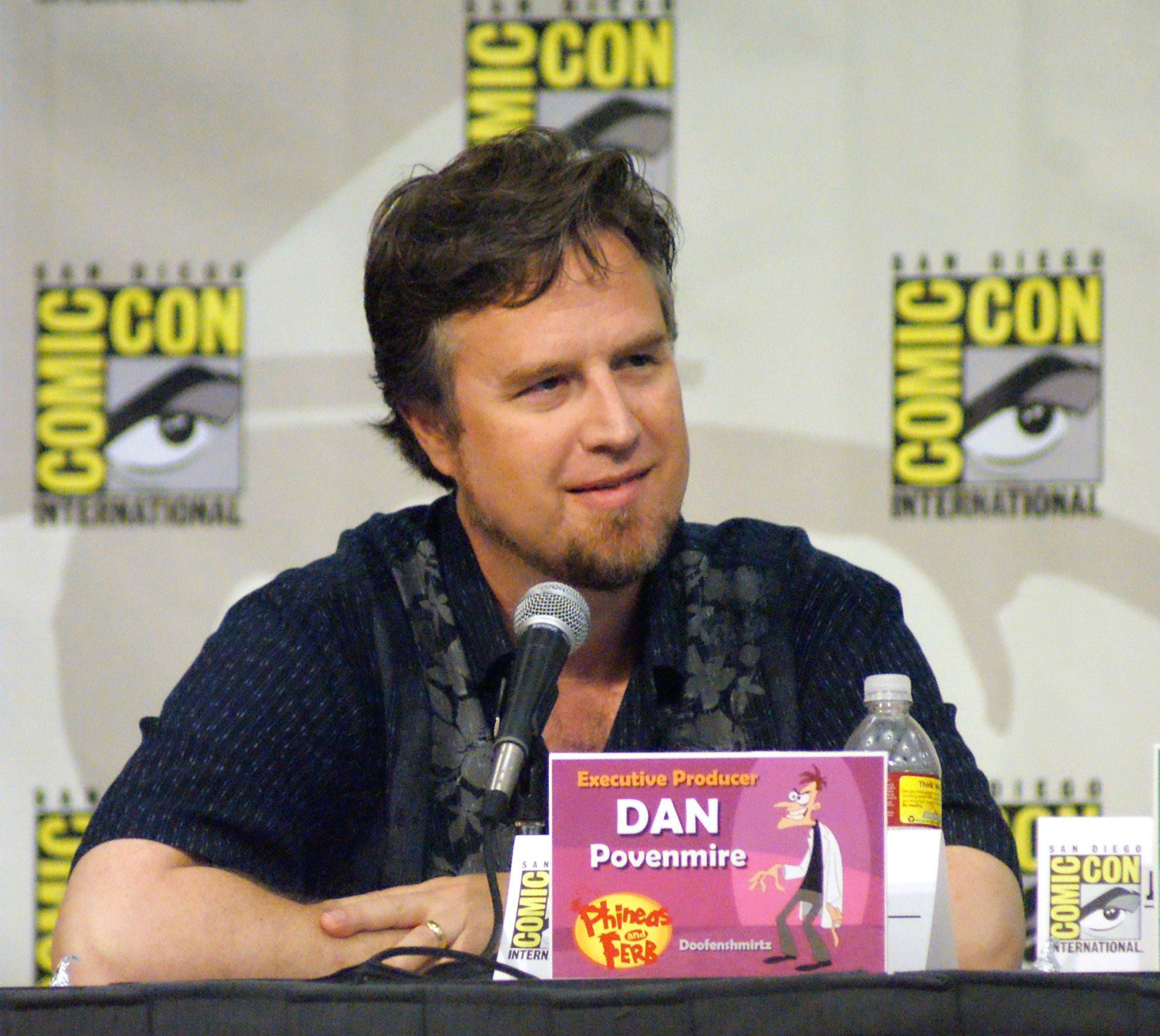
Episode director Dan Povenmire was nominated for an Annie Award for directing "PTV".

The episode was broadcast on November 6, 2005, on Fox. It gained a Nielsen rating of 4.4, making it the nineteenth most watched program in the week of October 31 to November 6.

The episode was positively received by critics. Maureen Ryan of the Chicago Tribune called "PTV" "Family Guy's most rebellious outing yet". TV Squad critic Ryan Budke considered "PTV" his favorite episode ever. Jacqueline Cutler of The Star-Ledger called "PTV" "[...] the funniest, most sardonic half-hour on TV in a while." While exclusively airing the sixth season of Family Guy for British audiences, BBC Three aired this episode as part of the Family Guy 100th Anniversary special, declaring it to be "The Best Episode...So Far". The Hartford Courant, however, gave it a largely negative review, stating it was "not even funny for a second." MacFarlane revealed in an interview that the crew received a letter of inquiry from the U.S. regulatory board regarding the episode, but much to his surprise, "they actually thought it was funny." The 59th Primetime Emmy Awards opened with Stewie and Brian singing about the upcoming TV season using the tune from "The FCC Song", originating from this episode. The altered version of the song contained references to shows such as Scrubs, Two and a Half Men, The Sopranos and Cavemen. Tom Eames of entertainment website Digital Spy placed the episode at number eight on his listing of the best Family Guy episodes in order of "yukyukyuks" and noted the episode was show writer's "way of aiming all their anger at the agencies who get in the way." He added that episode was "one of those episodes where all the jokes worked" and featured "the show's first over-the-top song numbers". IGN ranked PTV sixth in its "Top 15 Family Guy Episodes," compiled in 2014 for the 15th anniversary of the series.

"PTV" received a Primetime Emmy Award nomination in the Outstanding Animated Program (for Programming Less Than One Hour) category. Povenmire was nominated for an Annie Award for Directing in an Animated Television Production, but lost the award to Peter Shin, who directed the Family Guy episode "North by North Quahog". On June 1, 2007, the FCC song was voted second on The Paley Center for Media special "TV's Funniest Moments," behind The Chris Rock Show segment "Black Progress." The song was also voted sixth on IGN's list of Family Guy's "Top 10 Musical Moments", IGN stated "if there's a song that perfectly resonates what Family Guy is all about, then this is it."

== See also ==
- Channel J, public-access television channel featuring nude TV talk shows and other adult content
