= Sarah Frost =

British television director

- Born: Sarah Frost; England
- Occupations: Animator, director, storyboard artist, composer
- Years active: 1991–2009

Sarah Frost is an English television director, animation director, composer, and storyboard artist in America.

Frost is most known for directing The Fairly OddParents and episodes of the animated series Family Guy. She has also worked in animation on The Simpsons and Rocko's Modern Life.

== Family Guy ==
Frost joined Family Guy in 1999. She directed multiple episodes, including "Don't Make Me Over", "Model Misbehavior", "The Fat Guy Strangler", and "Petergeist".

== Partial filmography ==
As director

- The Jimmy Timmy Power Hour (2004)
- The Fairly OddParents (32 episodes, 2002–2005)
- The Jimmy Timmy Power Hour 2: When Nerds Collide (2006)
- Family Guy (5 episodes, 2002–2006)

As assistant director

- Family Guy (6 episodes, 2000–2003)

Animation department

- Rocko's Modern Life (8 episodes, 1993)
- King of the Hill (1997)
- The Simpsons (20 episodes, 1991–1997)
- Family Guy (4 episodes, 2001–2009)
- The Fairly OddParents (2 episodes, 2002)

As composer

- Rocko's Modern Life (16 episodes, 1993–1996)
