= The Courtship of Stewie's Father =

- Family Guy episode
- Episode no.: Season 4 Episode 16
- Directed by: Kurt Dumas
- Written by: Kirker Butler
- Production code: 4ACX19
- Original air date: November 20, 2005

Guest appearances
- Mo Collins; Carrie Fisher as Angela; Hunter Gomez; Phil LaMarr; Kim Parks; Kevin Michael Richardson; Jennifer Jean Snyder; Tara Strong; Fred Tatasciore

Episode chronology
← Previous "Brian Goes Back to College"	Next → "The Fat Guy Strangler"
- Family Guy season 4

"The Courtship of Stewie's Father" is the 16th episode of the fourth season of Family Guy, which originally aired on Fox on November 20, 2005. The episode sees Peter attempt to bond with Stewie after realizing that Stewie enjoys seeing Lois get hurt. After things go too far and Lois confronts Peter over the escalating pranks, Stewie feels betrayed, prompting a repentant Peter to take him to Walt Disney World Resort. Meanwhile, Chris is made to assist Herbert in his household chores after breaking his window, much to the delight of Herbert.

== Plot ==
After failing to receive the Employee of the Month award at Pawtucket Brewery, Peter attempts to charm his supervisor, Angela, who is unimpressed by his work performance. Meanwhile, Lois speaks with Stewie's preschool teacher and discovers several graphic pictures Stewie has drawn that show him killing her. She is oblivious to the obvious interpretation and instead notes that Peter is not included in any of the pictures.

Lois suggests that Peter make more effort to bond with Stewie. Peter reluctantly agrees but fails to make headway until he accidentally knocks a box off a high shelf in the kitchen, hitting Lois in the head, causing Stewie to laugh hysterically. After striking her with larger boxes and then a jar, and seeing Stewie's delight, Peter interprets Lois being hurt as a sign of father-son bonding. This prompts more vicious pranks on Lois, culminating with an incident where Peter pushes her into the trunk of their station wagon before driving it to the lake, where he and Stewie push it into the water. Later, a furious Lois returns home and, after sending Stewie to his room, demands an explanation from Peter. When Peter fails to win the argument and realizes he went too far, Stewie feels betrayed and refuses to talk to his father.

To make amends with Stewie after using Brian's advice, Peter takes him to Walt Disney World Resort in Florida. Excited at the prospect of visiting Disney World, Stewie forgives Peter. When the pair arrive, Peter inadvertently loses Stewie, who is captured by Disney World employees and forced to sing at the Tiny World ride. Peter finds him and takes him away while also freeing the slave children. The pair escape and return home, Stewie's faith in Peter is restored.

Meanwhile, after playing baseball in the street, Chris accidentally smashes his neighbor Herbert's window. In an attempt to repay his debt to Herbert, Chris agrees to help the elderly man in his household chores, much to Herbert's delight. Herbert takes Chris to dinner at a fine restaurant, where a photographer takes their photograph. Herbert then sings "Somewhere That's Green", envisioning a family life with Chris, but he falls asleep at the table after the song ends. Later at home, Herbert and his dog, Jesse, mope around the house until the ESPN Little League World Series comes on, perking up Herbert's spirits.

== Production ==
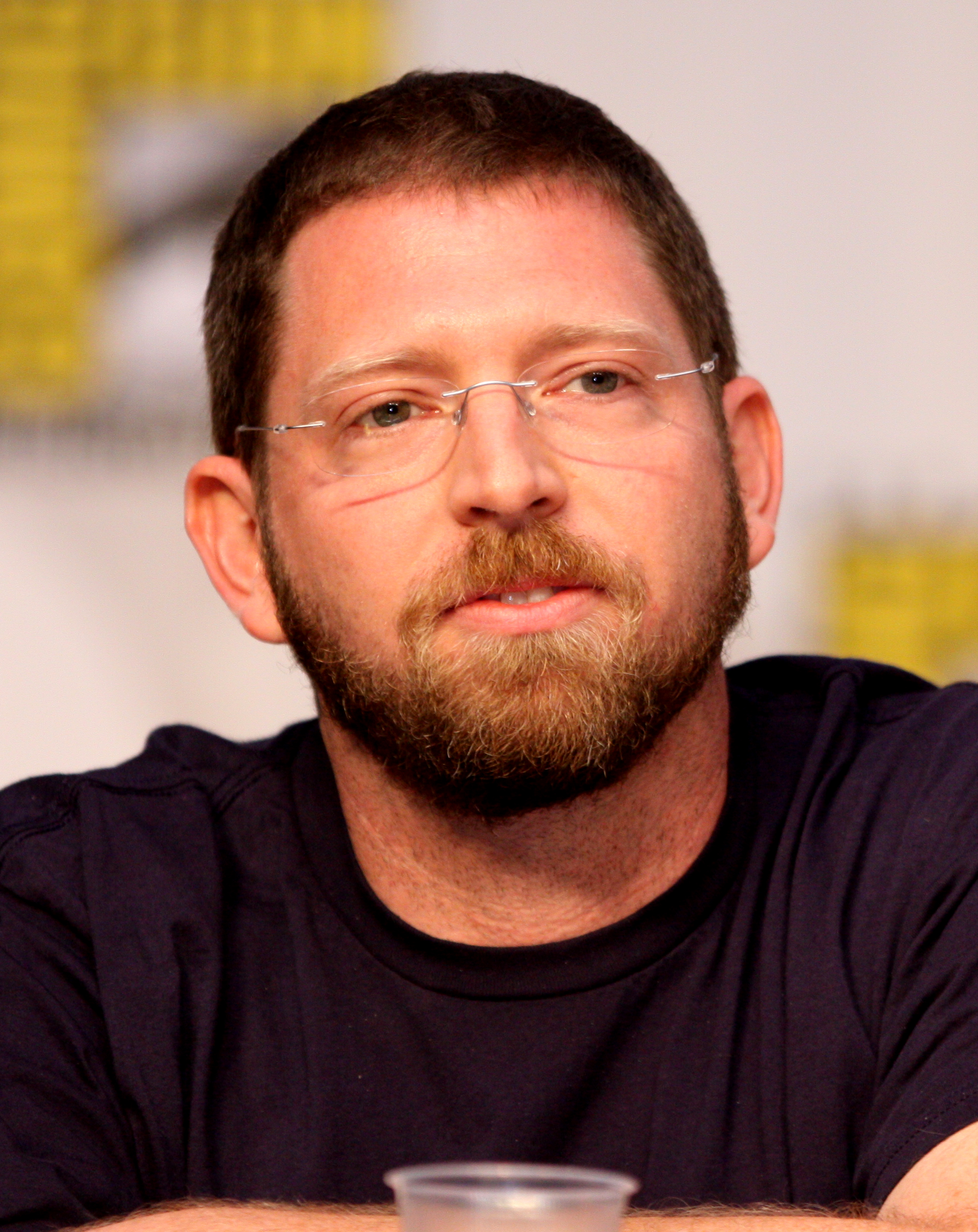
Kirker Butler wrote the episode.

This is the first storyline the show has produced which focuses largely on Herbert. Originally, the Herbert storyline was designed to be longer, and several other gags had been created showing Herbert attempting to come on to Chris, but broadcasting standards were nervous about the episode and forced the show to reduce the amount of time spent on the storyline. When Herbert comes to the house to tell Peter and Lois that Chris broke his window, he was meant to say more, but it was cut; one scene was intended to have Peter replying with "If he wants you to do a job, give him the best job you've ever given". When Quagmire is describing how he seduced two homeless twins, Fox censored the gesture which saw Quagmire pretending to put his hand up a woman's vagina (along with many other implied sexual acts) and showed Peter covering Stewie's ears. When God speaks to his lover after being telephoned by Jesus, he asks her "where were we", which she replies with "right about here" and hands him a condom. After telling her it's his birthday (so he won't have to use it), she replies a firm "no". The gag was designed in this way because broadcasting standards wanted to portray the message that God would not have unprotected sex.

Upon learning he has lost Stewie, a deleted scene was created showing Peter listing things he was going to do before finding Stewie, always leaving Stewie at the end of the list and putting his own needs before Stewie's.

Show producer Seth MacFarlane comments that the aftermath of the cockfight which Peter arranged was "a great drawing by Kurt Dumas". MacFarlane comments that it was "amazing lighting" on the flying car scene and that it is "so cool-looking". Stewie going crazy with excitement after learning Peter is taking him to Disney World is described by MacFarlane to be "a great piece of animation", and the scene "is a little more crazy than they [the show] normally go". In the DVD commentary, MacFarlane describes the vocal performance by Mike Henry, when singing as Herbert, to be "nothing short of brilliant", adding that "there's so much feeling in the song, you almost root for Herbert to get at least a wink from Chris".

MacFarlane made the sound effects of Stewie and Peter laughing excessively after attacking Lois, with no sounds of laughter being used from previous episodes. MacFarlane comments that he was "sweaty and exhausted after it". The reaction to the "Peanut Butter Jelly Time" scene astonished MacFarlane, as he believes it has become repetitious and annoying after he visited a karaoke bar in Hollywood and the club played it excessively. This scene was recreated in the ninth-season episode "The Big Bang Theory" with Stewie being the one in the banana.

== Cultural references ==
- The flying car scene is a reference to the 1989 sequel-film Back to the Future Part II.
- The song Herbert is singing when dreaming of living with Chris is the song "Somewhere That's Green" from the musical Little Shop of Horrors.
- Stewie is told the alternative to being a slave in the Tiny World ride is to be in a "Christmas movie with Tim Allen", referencing The Santa Clause.
- After rescuing Stewie, the security guard chases Peter and Stewie in to the "Indiana Jones Ride" (allusion to the Indiana Jones Adventure which is actually at Disneyland in California and not in Florida where the episode takes place). The following encounter with Michael Eisner, is a reference to the climax of Indiana Jones and the Temple of Doom.
- When Peter encounters the crows from Dumbo, he remarks about their racial stereotyping.
- Stewie is put to work on "It's a Tiny World", which is a parody of It's a Small World.
- Peter and Stewie dropping Lois in the lake may be a reference to '97 Bonnie & Clyde by Eminem.

== Reception ==
The episode was watched by over 9 million people on its original airdate. The Parents Television Council, a frequent critic of the show, reacted negatively to the episode, branding it the "Worst show of the week" on August 17, 2006, calling it a "sheer vulgar storyline." In a review of the episode by TV Squad, Ryan J. Budge noted "Tonight was another great episode of Family Guy," adding that "these episodes keep getting better and better."
