= Jungle Love (Family Guy) =

- Family Guy episode
- Episode no.: Season 4 Episode 13
- Directed by: Seth Kearsley
- Written by: Mark Hentemann
- Production code: 4ACX16
- Original air date: September 25, 2005

Guest appearances
- Carrie Fisher as Angela; Jay Mohr as Joe Pesci; Mía Maestro as Loca; Nicole Sullivan as Sandy Duncan

Episode chronology
← Previous "Perfect Castaway"	Next → "PTV"
- Family Guy season 4

"Jungle Love" is the 13th episode of the fourth season of Family Guy. Written by Mark Hentemann and directed by Seth Kearsley, the episode originally aired on Fox on September 25, 2005. Chris runs away from his home after getting hazed on his first day of school and joins the Peace Corps, after which he is dropped off in South America and becomes popular with the indigenous people. Peter gets a job at the Pawtucket Brewery, where the beer is free as long as employees do not drink during their shift.

== Plot ==
Chris is excited to become a freshman at the local high school, until Joe warns Chris about the Freshman Hunt, a hazing ritual in which the freshmen are beaten with paddles by Upperclassman, and even school staff. When Lois is dropping Chris off at school, she falsely assures him the ritual is not real before shouting "Freshman!" to lure over other students.

After a short chase, Chris is caught and paddled by several people, including Mayor Adam West. At home, Chris asks Brian for advice on how to cope, and Brian tells Chris about his time in the Peace Corps. Chris decides to join the Corps and goes to South America, where he becomes popular with the natives. When he leads the tribe in a dance ("Wake Me Up Before You Go-Go"), he unwittingly marries the chief's daughter, as dictated by the tribe's customs.

Meanwhile, Peter, who has been unemployed for some time, goes to work at the Pawtucket Brewery, where the beer is free as long as employees do not drink during their shift. However, Peter cannot control his drinking and he is demoted to the shipping department (where drinking is not permitted), where he ends up as a subordinate to Opie, an intellectually disabled but somewhat more qualified man who speaks in unintelligible babbling.

When Lois learns of Chris' marriage, she immediately travels down to South America with the rest of the family. Upon their arrival, Peter is seen as the richest man in the country with just $37. He takes advantage of this by paying the natives nickels and dimes to act according to his whimsy. When Chris accuses Peter of "using" the natives to escape his troubles, Lois points out that that is also what Chris did. Chris then decides to return to Rhode Island, telling his wife that he must leave her, casually referring to his status as a freshman and mentioning she is only 11. The natives' response imitates the Freshman Hunt by upperclassmen in Quahog: as they chase the Griffins in a hostile manner, Chris realizes that there is no place to hide from his problems. The Griffins escape on a seaplane, but forget Meg, who is left face-down in the river, riddled by darts and arrows.

== Production ==
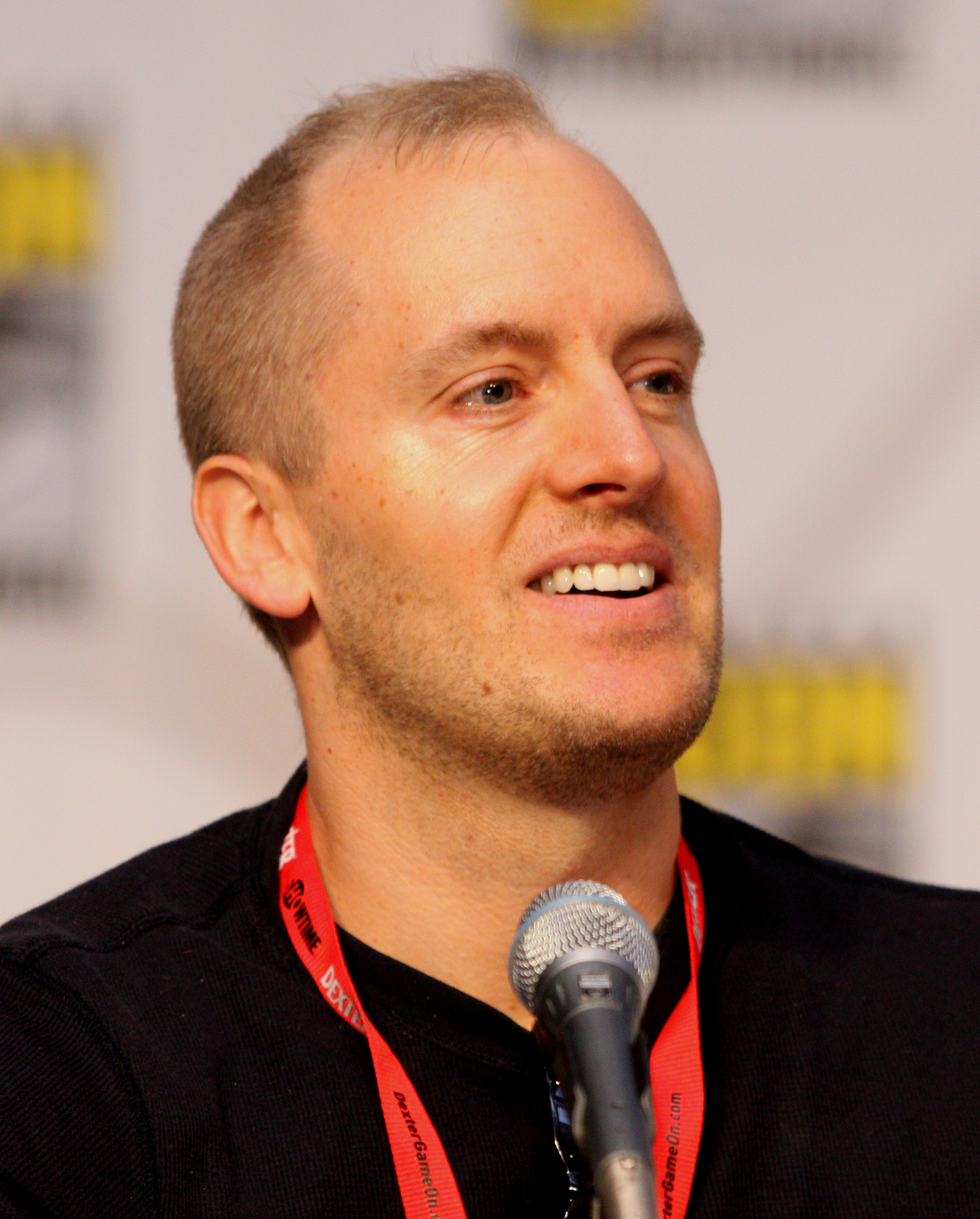
Future showrunner Mark Hentemann wrote the episode. He also provided the voice for Opie in this episode.

The episode was written by future showrunner Mark Hentemann and was directed by Peter Shin and Seth Kearsley. It featured special guest appearances from Ralph Garman, Lisa Wilhoit, Danny Smith, and Nicole Sullivan. It also featured guest appearances by Adam West, playing himself as the eponymous Mayor Adam West, and Carrie Fisher in her first appearance as Angela, Peter's boss.

== Cultural references ==
The episode contains some cultural references, for example when Stewie becomes a tootsie, when Lou Gehrig's evil plot backfired, and Kevin Federline's Magic Mirror, which is Peter. The episode featured the 1984 hit single "Wake Me Up Before You Go-Go" from the British pop duo Wham!. When Chris is being paddled at school, it parodies a scene from the film Dazed and Confused, with Alice Cooper's "No More Mr. Nice Guy" playing. The title of the episode is a reference to songs of the same name by The Time and Steve Miller Band. There is a cutaway gag that involves Stewie starring in a stage musical adaptation of the film My Left Foot, and another where he takes violent revenge on actor Will Ferrell after being disappointed by his film Bewitched. The last scene of the episode is a reference to Raiders of the Lost Ark.

== Reception ==
In his review of the episode, Ryan J. Budke of TV Squad reviewed the episode positively, commenting: "this week had some of the quickest (Deadwood) and longest (cave-couple fight) jokes that Family Guy has done and I was in stitches for just about every one", adding "I can't heap enough praise on this show." Critics of both Popmatters and IGN criticized the first few episodes but felt the show regained its humor after "Don't Make Me Over" which included this episode.
