= Breaking Out Is Hard to Do =

- Family Guy episode
- Episode no.: Season 4 Episode 9
- Directed by: Kurt Dumas
- Written by: Tom Devanney
- Production code: 4ACX12
- Original air date: July 17, 2005

Guest appearances
- Dat Phan; Brian Tochi

Episode chronology
← Previous "8 Simple Rules for Buying My Teenage Daughter"	Next → "Model Misbehavior"
- Family Guy season 4

"Breaking Out Is Hard to Do" is the ninth episode of the fourth season of Family Guy. It originally broadcast on Fox on July 17, 2005, guest-starred Dat Phan and Brian Tochi, and was written by Tom Devanney. The episode sees Lois becoming addicted to the rush of shoplifting; she, however, is soon arrested and sentenced to three years imprisonment. Peter successfully smuggles her out of the prison, and the Griffins begin a new life in "Asiantown" away from where they are high-profile fugitives, only for Joe to track them down and attempt to arrest them. Overall, the episode was received positively by critics and media sources.

== Plot ==
During a grocery shopping trip, Lois realizes she is short on money to pay for food. She goes to return a ham to the meat department but instead hides it in her purse and steals it. Hooked on the thrill of shoplifting, she begins stealing other items, quickly becoming addicted to theft. She begins to indulge in large shoplifting sprees, including stealing a Matisse painting, which arouses the suspicion of Brian. While attempting to steal from an auto parts store, Lois is caught by Brian, who tells her what she is doing is wrong. Lois accepts his reasoning, but as she loads up the car to return her stolen goods, she is caught by Joe and arrested.

In court, Lois is sentenced to serve three years in prison after trying to steal the judge's gavel. The Griffin household turns to chaos in Lois' absence, and the family realizes they need to break Lois out of jail. During a visit to Lois in the prison, Peter smuggles her out by stuffing her into his mouth. As Lois' escape is realized, the Griffins jump into a laundry van, escaping to Quahog's Asiantown (which evokes the traits of Chinatown, Japantown, Koreatown and Vietnamtown). There they rent a run-down apartment to begin new lives.

Chris begins a career as a rickshaw driver, while Stewie takes a job at a sweatshop sewing shoes (but is fired after sewing a shoe to his hand). Peter becomes a sumo wrestler but is spotted by Joe on the television shortly afterward. Joe successfully tracks the family down and pursues them through Asiantown, leading them into the city sewers. Lois decides to surrender and face the consequences so that the rest of the family won't have to, but as Joe attempts to detain her, he slips in the sewer and is almost swept off a nearby ledge. Lois pulls Joe to safety, and to show his gratitude, Joe manages to get Lois' sentence cancelled, and life returns to normal for the family.

== Production ==
"Breaking Out Is Hard to Do" is the first Family Guy episode to be written by Tom Devanney. When Stewie attempts to asphyxiate himself in the supermarket, he was originally meant to state "Either I was a C-section or you're Stretch Vagstrong", which would have been a reference to the Stretch Armstrong action figure, but broadcasting standards prohibited them from showing it. During the "Take On Me" sequence, Family Guy had obtained full rights to use the "Take On Me" music video completely, but animators re-produced the video to make it easier for production. Originally, a joke had been drafted showing Brian standing next to a tabloid newspaper with a picture of Kirstie Alley and commenting on her weight, only for her to enter the grocery shop in Godzilla-like size and throw items from the shelves, but the sketch was removed to save time during the episode. The Matisse painting shown in the Griffins' dining room is only animated similar to an actual Matisse painting due to a legal issue with the paintings. The episode production staff spent a lot of time deciding what would be Lois' motivation for stealing en masse.

An unused scene was drafted showing Chris, directly after hearing Lois' prison term, flashbacking back to him watching Six Feet Under, seeing a same-sex couple kissing, and exclaiming "Oh, come on!" The song based around Glenn Quagmire was sung and recorded by professional studio singers who sing at events such as the Academy Awards. The scene following Peter saying to Lois: "I had to do, well you know, that thing that you usually do for me every Thursday night" showing Peter attempting to give himself fellatio, hitting his head on the wall and falling down the stairs was repeatedly fought by broadcasting standards, but they eventually allowed the scene. In the original episode draft, Peter was to be seen falling down the stairs, and Stewie's foot was to be lodged inside Peter's anus, where he was to lose his shoe. Peter breaks the fourth wall and begins to speak with viewers during his interview with the sumo wrestling employee; Executive Producer David A. Goodman comments in the episode DVD commentary that this is "one of the few times, maybe the only time, when [the show] can step out of format and point out the format." The "CBS Asiantown" logo shown on the Griffins' television was prohibited from broadcast on the televised version of the episode.

== Cultural references ==
Chris is shown participating in the video "Take On Me" — a song released by a-ha in 1985 — while fetching milk for Lois. He then breaks out on the other side, with no understanding of what just happened. Lois calls on Brian saying he was too busy eye-balling Glenn Close on Redbook magazine. Chris watches the movie The Blob. Peter riding Falkor the luckdragon is a reference to fantasy novel The Neverending Story. The chase sequence between Lois and Joe is a reference to a sequence from Raiders of the Lost Ark as Joe is pulled along by the attached garden hose and pulls himself under the moving car. Peter goes to a book club while Lois is gone, where the members are reading The Lovely Bones. The Griffins escaping out of their apartment to evade Joe is a reference to Butch Cassidy and the Sundance Kids, with the rest of the chase through Asiantown being a reference to Revenge of the Pink Panther. The police helicopter pilot in Asiantown stating he pretends he is shooting at Jamie Farr and Alan Alda when firing rockets is a reference to the actors of M*A*S*H. Joe shooting down two TIE fighters while flying through the sewer is a reference to Star Wars. Characters from the 1985 adventure–comedy film The Goonies are seen talking with the Griffins in the sewer. The episode title is a reference to the Neil Sedaka song, "Breaking Up Is Hard To Do."

== Reception ==
This episode was the most-watched Fox program on its airdate among adults 18 to 49; 5.75 million viewers watched. In his review of the Family Guy volume 3 DVD, Francis Rizzo III of DVD Talk wrote "But if any moment stands out among this run, it's the supermarket scene in "Breaking Out is Hard to Do." When Chris is pulled into the "Take On Me" video by a-ha, it's a perfect blend of what this show does best, combining nonsense, the '80s and some neat animation. The lead-in, the punchline and the execution of the whole scene is handled so well that it might be one of the show's most memorable ever." In her review of the episode, Kim Voynar of TV Squad wrote "This was, overall, a very funny episode. Lots of funny references—the Trix Rabbit, Karl Malden, MASH, Star Wars, "Three's Company" The funniest moment for me, was the bit with Stewie walking in on Brian cross-dressing. That alone was worth the price of admission."
