= Peter Shin =

American animator

Peter Shin (born September 7, 1977) is an American animator, director, and producer who served as supervising director of the adult-animated show Family Guy, himself directing the episodes "Death Has a Shadow" (the series premiere), "Emission Impossible", "North by North Quahog", "It's a Trap!", "The Simpsons Guy", "Emmy-Winning Episode" (co-directing with Dominic Bianchi and James Purdum), and "Tales of Former Sports Glory" (co-directing with Joe Vaux) as well as its movie, Stewie Griffin: The Untold Story. He has also directed Big Bug Man and several episodes of Duckman, served as a character layout artist for The Simpsons for several episodes between 1990 and 1995, and has also worked on the cartoon Freakazoid!.

Shin won an Annie Award for directing "North by North Quahog". He has also been nominated for several Emmy Awards.

== Filmography ==
=== Film ===
Title	Year	Notes	
Looney Tunes: Back in Action	2003	—	storyboard artist
Despicable Me	2010	—	additional story artist

=== Television ===
Title	Year	Notes	
The Simpsons	1993–1995	—	timing director; lead character artist
Family Guy	1999–present	—	supervising director; supervising animation producer; co-executive producer
American Dad!	2005	—	storyboard artist
