= University of Rhode Island Botanical Gardens =

Botanical gardens in Kingston, Rhode Island, United States

Coordinates: 41.489608°N 71.5257232°W

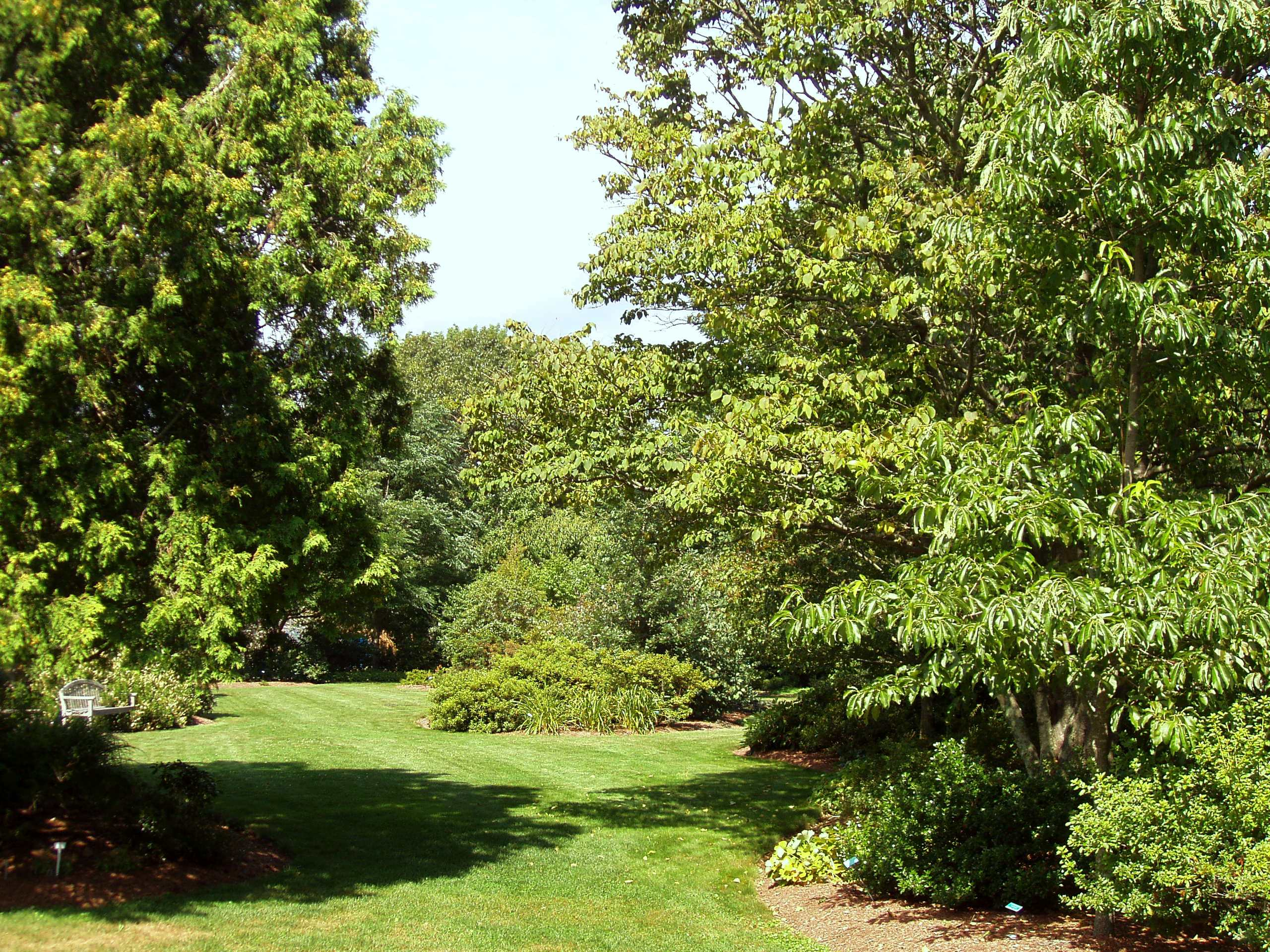
- Interactive map of University of Rhode Island Botanical Gardens
- Type: Botanical garden
- Location: Kingston, Rhode Island
- Area: 4.5 acres (1.8 ha)
- Owner: University of Rhode Island
- Website: Official website

The University of Rhode Island Botanical Gardens are botanical gardens located on the University of Rhode Island campus in Kingston, Rhode Island, United States. The gardens cover an area of 4.5 acres (1.8 ha) and are open to the public free of charge.

The gardens were started as the Learning Landscape in 1992 as a donation of materials and labor from the Rhode Island Nursery and Landscape Association. The gardens were renamed the URI Botanical Gardens in 2003.

The URI Botanical Gardens showcase sustainable landscape plants and practices. They feature a home garden and landscape, a Memorial White Garden, the Ericaceous Garden, the Annual Garden, the Formal Gardens and Graduation Stage, the Shade Garden, the Matthew J. Horridge Conservatory and the Chester Clayton Rose Garden.

== See also ==
- List of botanical gardens and arboretums in Rhode Island
