= List of botanical gardens and arboretums in Rhode Island =

This list of botanical gardens and arboretums in Rhode Island is intended to include all the significant botanical gardens and arboretums in the U.S. state of Rhode Island.

Name	Image	Affiliation	City
Blithewold Mansion, Gardens and Arboretum			Bristol
University of Rhode Island Botanical Gardens		University of Rhode Island	Kingston
Wilcox Park			Westerly
Roger Williams Park Botanical Center			Providence

== See also ==
- List of botanical gardens and arboretums in the United States
