= Roger Williams Park Botanical Center =

Park with greenhouses in Providence, Rhode Island, United States

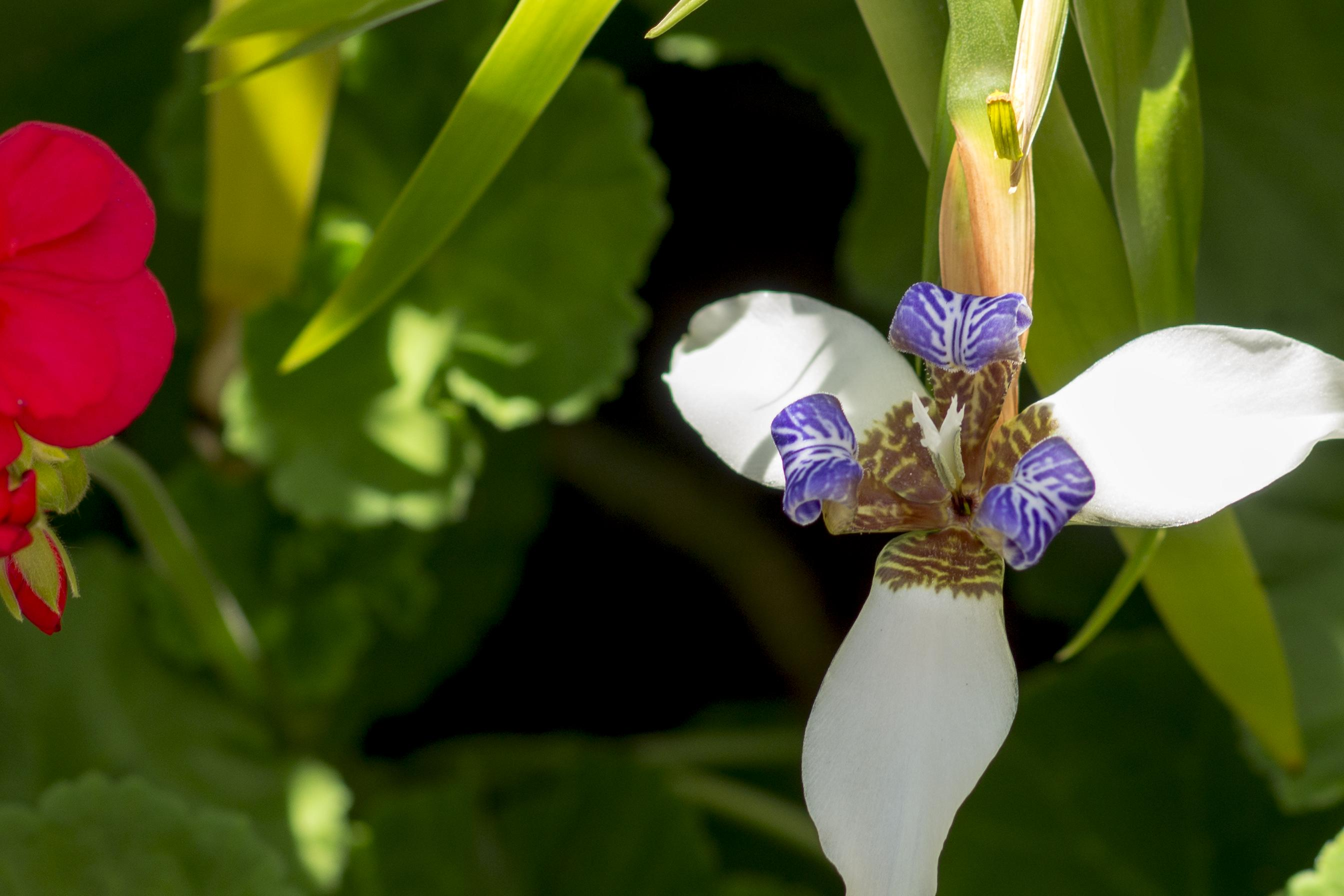
- Interactive map of Roger Williams Park Botanical Center
- Location: Providence, Rhode Island
- Coordinates: 41.7860°N 71.4196°W
- Area: 12000 square ft
- Operator: City of Providence
- Species: approx 150
- Website: Official website

The Roger Williams Park Botanical Center is located in Roger Williams Park in Providence, Rhode Island. It opened in March 2007. It includes two connected greenhouses filled with plants, fountains, a fish pond and a small waterfall. It is the largest indoor garden open to the public in New England, encompassing approximately 12,000 square feet of indoor gardens.

The Botanical Center includes four greenhouses: The Conservatory, the Mediterranean Room, and two smaller greenhouses with a "Flavor Lab," and a Lil Sprouts Play area. There are over 150 different species and cultivars of plants including 17 different types of palms. All the plants, with the exception of the large palm trees, were installed by park personnel. Many of the plants were saved from the old greenhouse displays and replanted, specifically most of the Cacti, Agave and Aloe.

== See also ==
- Roger Williams Park
- List of botanical gardens and arboretums in Rhode Island
