= Brian Goes Back to College =

- Family Guy episode
- Episode no.: Season 4 Episode 15
- Directed by: Greg Colton
- Written by: Matt Fleckenstein
- Production code: 4ACX18
- Original air date: November 13, 2005

Guest appearances
- Ralph Garman; Mark Hentemann; Phil LaMarr as Gary Coleman; Dolph Lundgren (stock footage)

Episode chronology
← Previous "PTV"	Next → "The Courtship of Stewie's Father"
- Family Guy season 4

"Brian Goes Back to College" is the 15th episode of the fourth season of the American animated television series Family Guy. It originally aired on the Fox network in the United States on November 13, 2005. Guest stars on the show were Ralph Garman, Mark Hentemann and Phil LaMarr. The episode was described by show creator Seth MacFarlane to be "a real treat for The A-Team fans". The episode contained several connections with The New Yorker; in response, they wrote a friendly article about the episode. The plot consists of Peter, Joe, Cleveland and Quagmire winning a costume contest dressed as characters from The A-Team, and deciding to improve their community by continuing to act like the characters of the show. Brian is hired by The New Yorker, but is later dismissed as he did not complete college, so he returns to finish his education.

== Plot ==
After Peter, Joe, Cleveland, and Quagmire win a costume contest as characters from The A-Team, Brian writes a report about it for the local newspaper. He is later telephoned by a member of The New Yorker, who tell him they would like him to work for their magazine. Brian is initially given a warm welcome by the staff, but he is immediately fired after he informs them that he never graduated from college.

Meanwhile, disappointed at no longer being able to be The A-Team, Peter decides to become an unofficial A-Team alongside Joe, Cleveland, and Quagmire, and help their local community. Peter designs a replica of the van used by The A-Team.

After encouragement from Lois, Brian decides to return to Brown University in order to complete his education so he can go back to The New Yorker. Stewie, unknown to Brian, returns to college with him. Brian's new teacher takes an instant disliking to him, but his opinion of Brian quickly changes after he cheats and gets high marks on a test by plagiarizing Stewie's work with his permission, due to Stewie's knowledge of technology and physics. Brian goes to tell his teacher that he cheated, but is interrupted, as the teacher tells him Brian has inspired him, and he was so depressed that he was planning to commit suicide. Meanwhile, Peter becomes very satisfied with his A-Team's actions, but the team fails a mission to save a local park from demolition by becoming "side-tracked by idle conversation" with the builders. The guilty A-Team disbands afterwards.

Brian eventually cracks under the pressure of a final test and knowing he will only pass if he cheats, he decides to return home with Stewie. A shocked Lois attempts to encourage him to go back and finish the test, and eventually chases him away with a vacuum cleaner called "Mr. Hoover".

With the help of Stewie, Brian starts to do a lot of exercise, including climbing up a snowy mountain, but then realizes his test is only a few hours away. Worried that Brian would be late, Lois persuades Peter to revive The A-Team one last time and drive Brian to his test, which is successful, and Brian arrives on time. He fails his test, but remains proud of himself for not cheating, much to the dismay of the family, who berate him and tell him that he probably should have cheated.

== Production ==
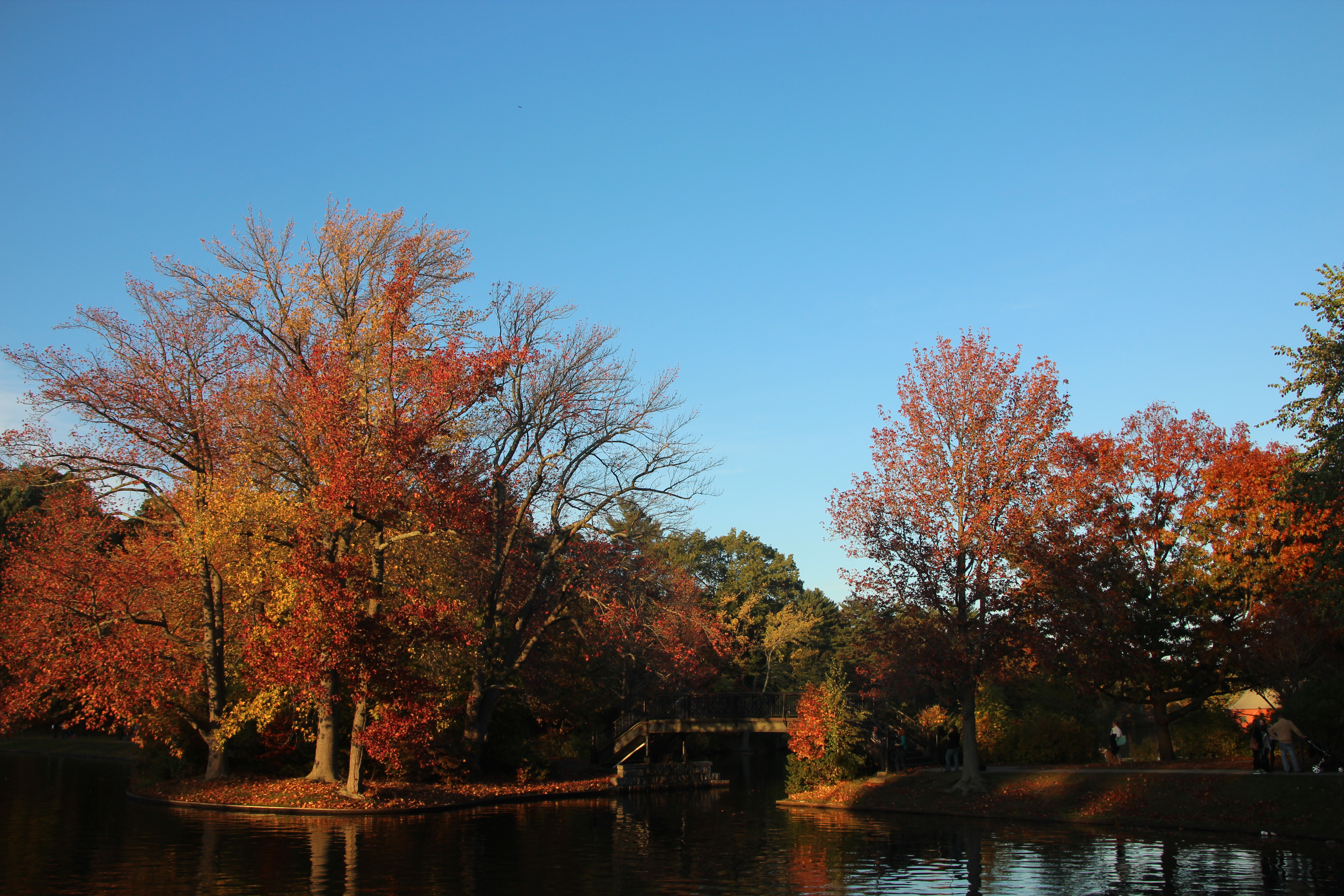
Several viewers wrote to Family Guy staff asking if Roger Williams Park would be demolished in real life

Several people who were involved in the production of the original A-Team worked with show producers for this episode. Ron Jones wrote the music during the scene where Peter and his friends help the man in the bar; Jones had also written music for the actual The A-Team series in the 1980s. This episode marks the third appearance of Brian's wheelchair-using teacher; he originally appears in "Ready, Willing, and Disabled" and "Brian the Bachelor" when competing in the Special Olympics during the former episode and attempting to become a candidate for The Bachelorette in the latter episode. The professor's and his wife's voices were not played by a real person; they were made from a generic computer system in the studio. A deleted scene was animated which showed the professor informing Brian that he once had a student who was identical to him, but instead took human form and had a mustache. David Goodman commented this as being a pretty strange gag. Several viewers contacted Greg Colton, a Family Guy director, asking him if Roger Williams Park (a real public park in Rhode Island) was due to be demolished. He commented that one couple were extremely worried, because they were due to have their wedding there. The title of the episode was originally meant to be "Brian Goes Back to College and Stewie Goes With Him for Obvious Comedic Reasons", but it was deemed too long.

== Cultural references ==
Peter and his friends parody the 1980s American drama series The A-Team. When the introduction sequence of The A-Team was made for the episode, it took the writers and producers several attempts to animate it correctly. The background images used were real images used from The A-Team's intro sequence. When Brian is shown to be exercising heavily at a ski resort under the supervision of Stewie, and then climbs the mountain and shouts from the top, the montage is a reference to Rocky IV. The 1980s television convention that the gang attends features references to Too Close for Comfort ("Cosmic Cow Autographs") and The Cosby Show ("Bill Cosby aerobics"). At the American football game, the teams playing are "Brown" and the "Board of Education", referencing the Brown v. Board of Education court case in 1954 which led to desegregation in the US school system.

== Reception ==
The New Yorker wrote a friendly response article to this episode, as they were featured in it. They appeared to take no offense at the episode, and did not retaliate. Ryan J. Budke of TV Squad praised The A Team parody in the episode, stating that the "30 second recreation of the A-Team opening had me about as excited as anything else on TV".
