= Roger Williams Park =

City park and historic district in Providence, Rhode Island, United States

- Roger Williams Park Historic District
- U.S. National Register of Historic Places
- U.S. Historic district
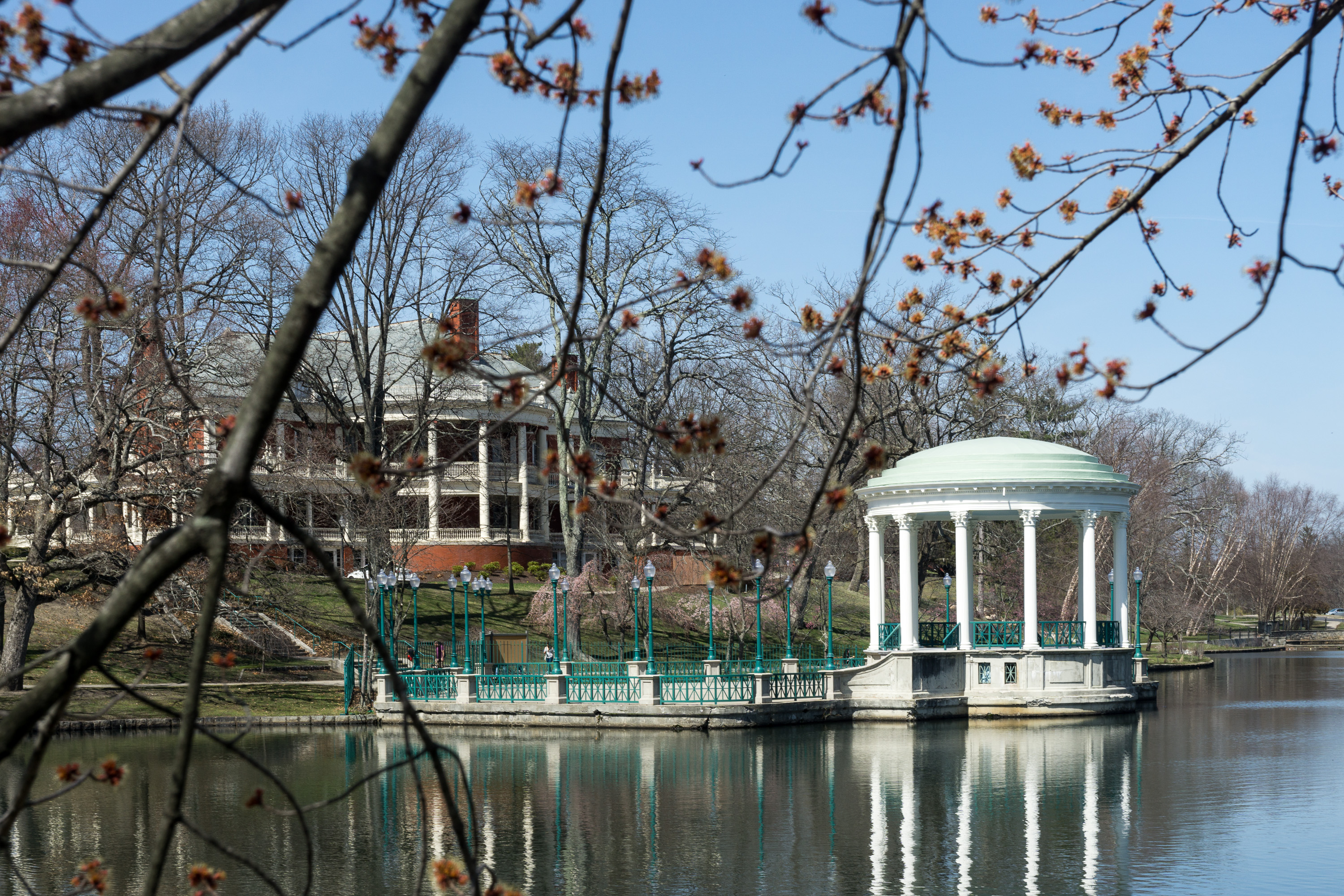
- Bandstand and Casino

- Location within Rhode Island Location within the United States
- Location: Providence, Rhode Island
- Coordinates: 41.78399°N 71.410889°W
- Built: 1872
- Architect: Horace William Shaler Cleveland
- Architectural style: Colonial Revival, Queen Anne
- Website: https://www.providenceri.gov/parks
- NRHP reference No.: 66000002
- Added to NRHP: October 15, 1966

Roger Williams Park is an elaborately landscaped 427-acre (173 ha) city park in Providence, Rhode Island and a historic district listed on the National Register of Historic Places. The park is named after Roger Williams, the founder of the city of Providence and the primary founder of the state of Rhode Island.

== History ==
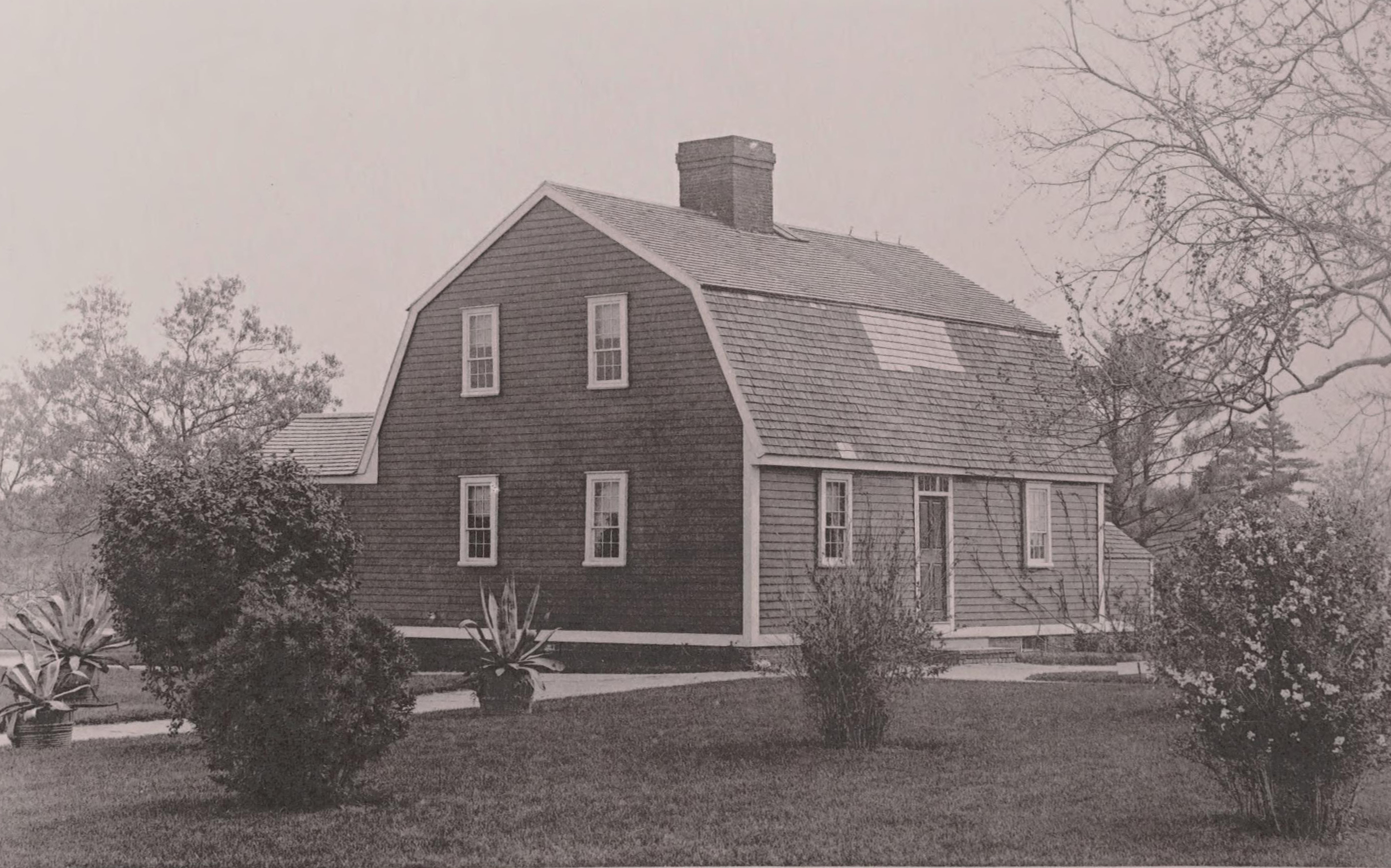
Betsey Williams house, 1891

The land for the park was a gift to the people of Providence in 1872, in accordance with the will of Betsey^{[Note1]} Williams, the last descendant of Roger Williams to inherit his land. It had been the family farm and was the last of the original land granted to Roger Williams in 1638 by Canonicus, chief of the Narragansett tribe. The family farmhouse was built in 1773 and is now known as the Betsey Williams Cottage; the cottage and the Williams family burial ground (including Betsey's grave) are still maintained within the park.

The original bequest consisted of about 100 acres. Additional land to the south was purchased in 1891 at a cost of $359,000, consisting mostly of unimproved land that was covered with woods and ponds; it brought the total area of the park to about 400 acres. The natural history museum opened in 1895.

=== Roger Williams Speedway ===
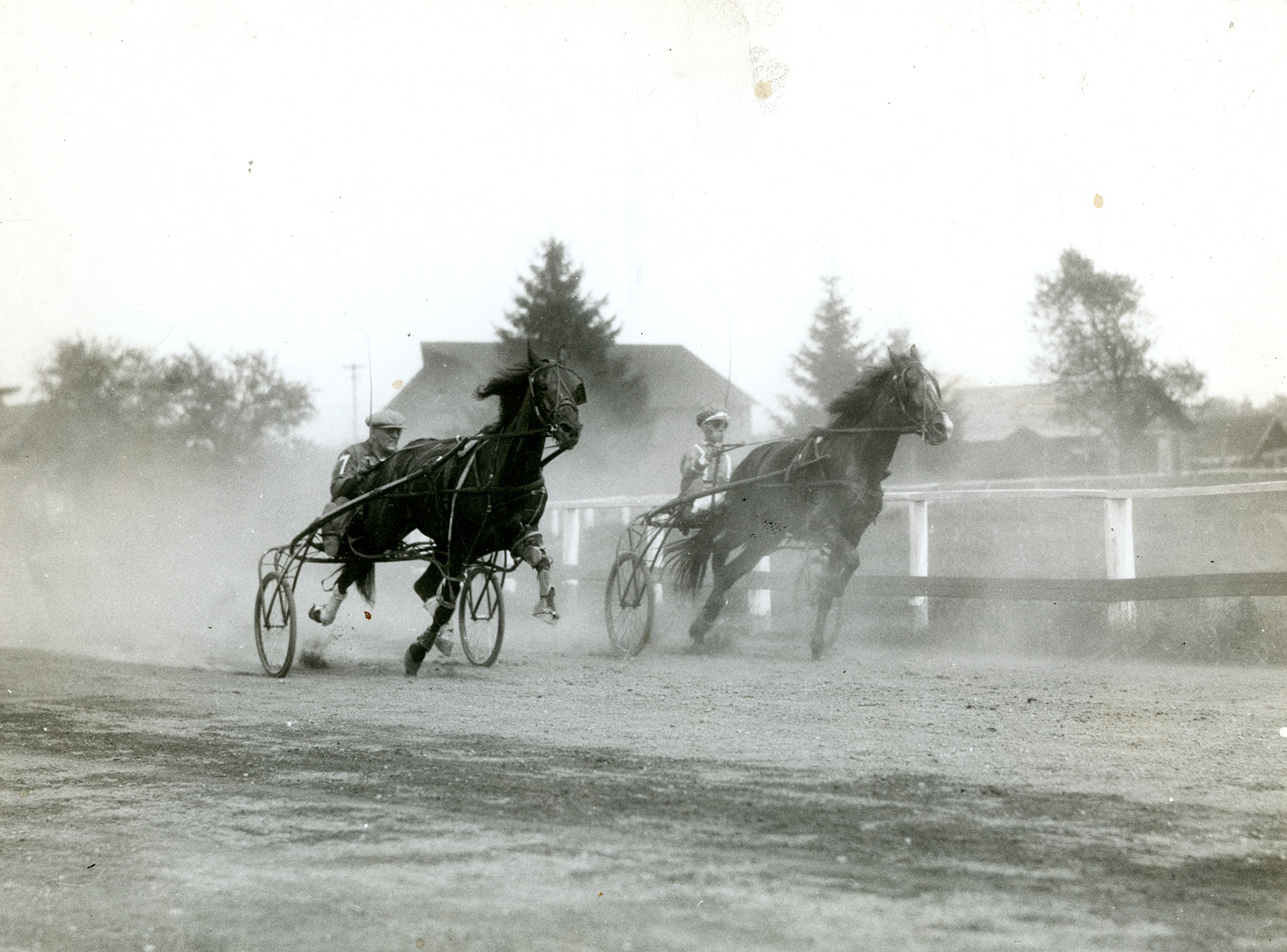
Roger Williams Speedway ca. 1920s

From at least 1915 to about 1949, the park contained a half-mile racetrack that ran from Elmwood Avenue to Broad Street. The track normally hosted harness races; it was a particularly popular Fourth of July attraction. In 1924 it was the site of an army hurdle race.

=== 2016 renovations ===
The Rhode Island Foundation began a renovation effort in the park in 2016 as a celebration of their centennial, beginning with the park's historic bandstand in December 2016. The renovations will expand to other park buildings and entrances. In June 2017, a dedicated car and pedestrian lane was added to Frederick Green Memorial Boulevard as part of these renovations, although this change was opposed by some Cranston residents, including Cranston mayor Allan Fung.

=== Gateway visitor center ===
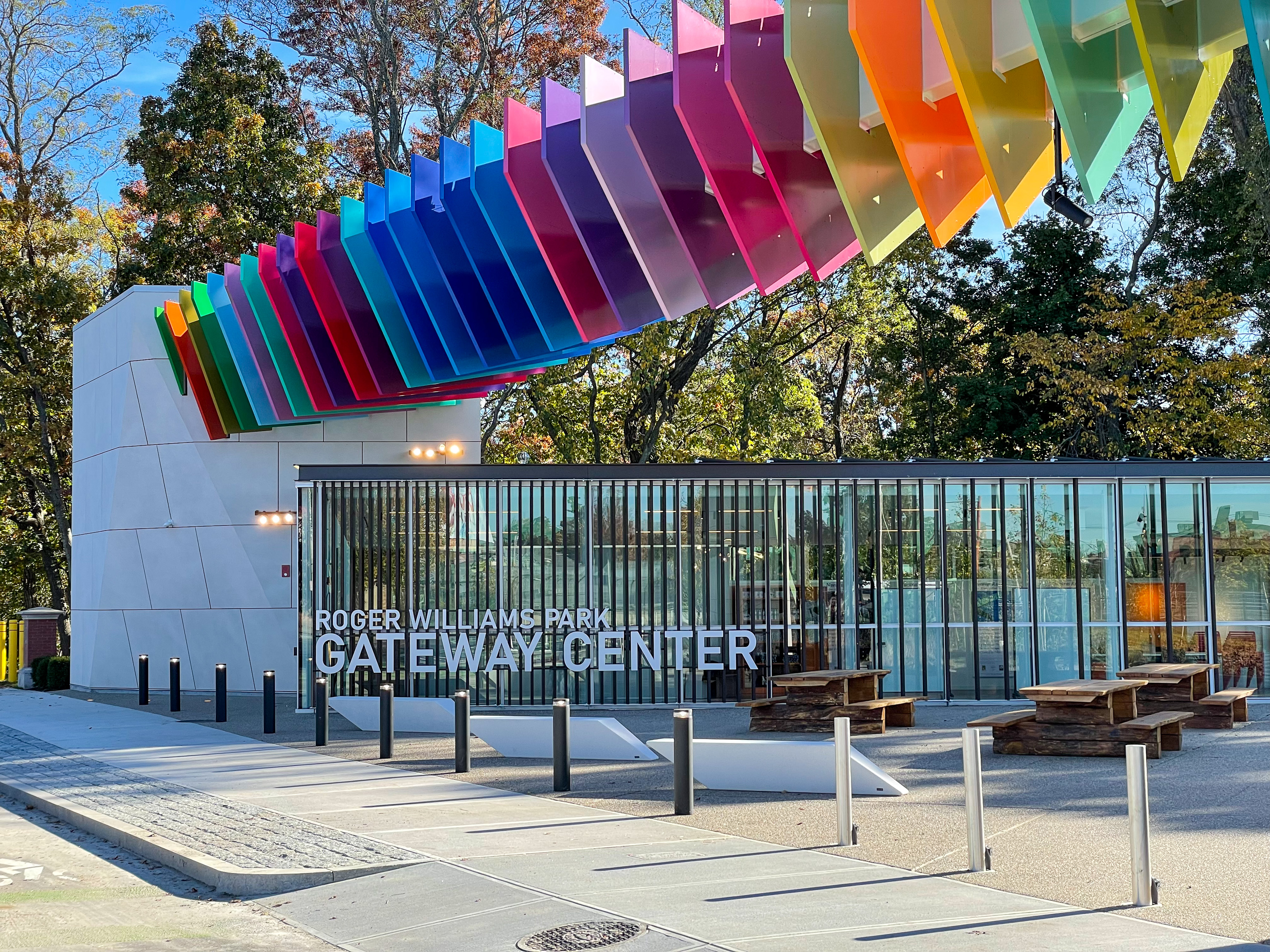
Gateway Center

In Fall 2022, a Gateway and Visitor Center for the park opened on Broad Street. Designed by INFORM studio, the center is intended to increase community access to the park. The center provides information about public events, amenities, and services in Roger Williams Park and in the surrounding neighborhood.

== Layout ==
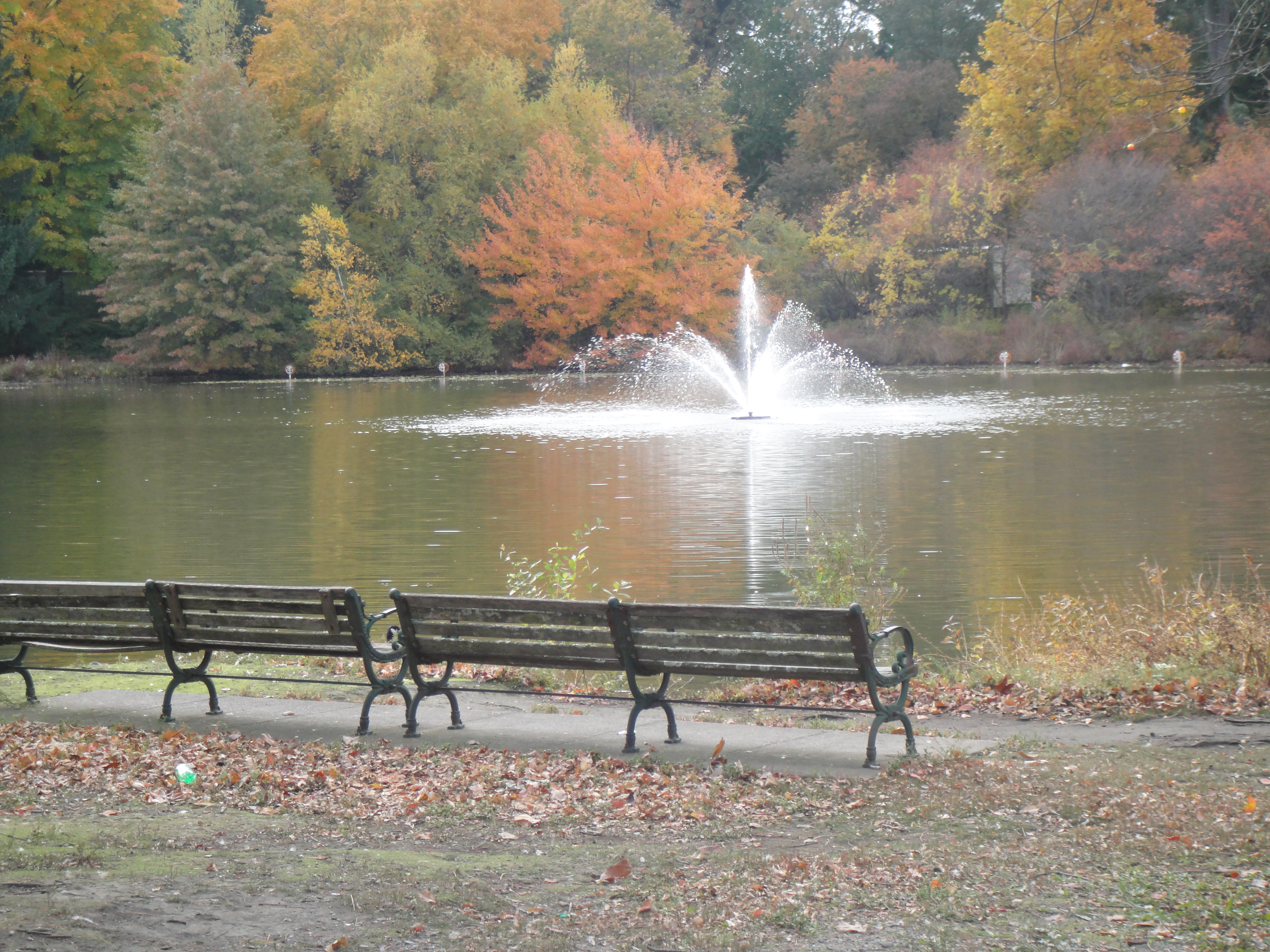
Many lakes are found within the park.

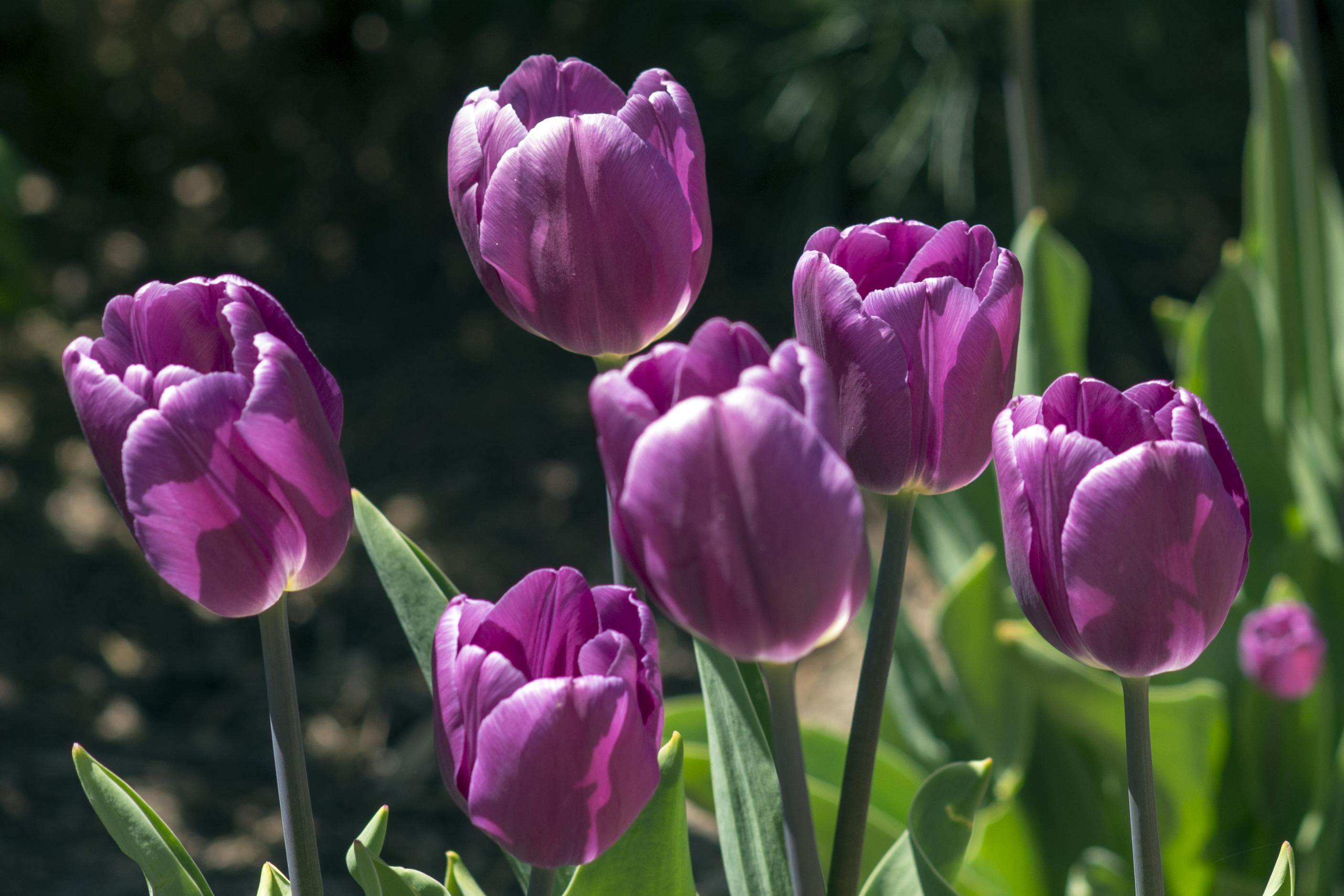
Many flowering plants throughout the Botanical Center, walking paths, and gardens.

The park contains seven lakes which comprise approximately 98 acres (40 ha), and it is located in the southernmost part of the city of Providence bordering the city of Cranston. It was designed by Horace Cleveland in 1878 and was constructed in the 1880s. Many of the roads, bridges, and sidewalks were built by the Works Progress Administration from 1935 to 1940. The National Trust for Historic Preservation called Roger Williams Park one of the finest urban parks in the US in their 2000 annual report.

The park and historic district contains:

- The Gateway Visitor Center on Broad Street
- The Roger Williams Park Zoo
- The Roger Williams Park Museum of Natural History and Planetarium
- The Roger Williams Park Botanical Center
- Japanese Gardens
- Victorian Rose Gardens
- The Dalrymple Boathouse and boat rentals
- The Carousel Village
- The "Hasbro Boundless Playground" which is accessible for handicapped children
- The Temple to Music
- The Roger Williams Park Casino
- The Providence Police Department's Mounted Command Center
- Historical tours
- Miles of walking paths

== Gallery ==
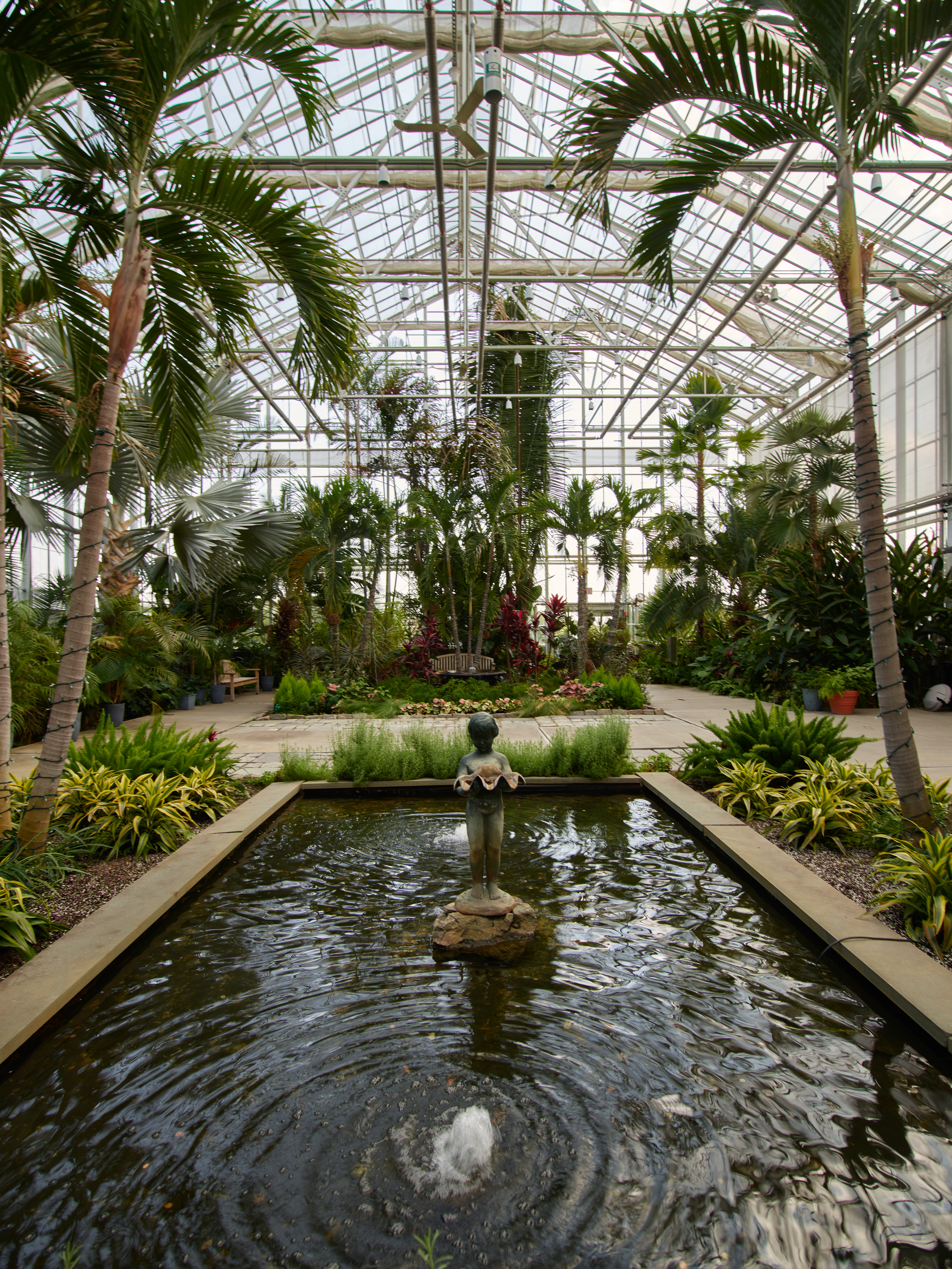
Roger Williams Park Botanical Center

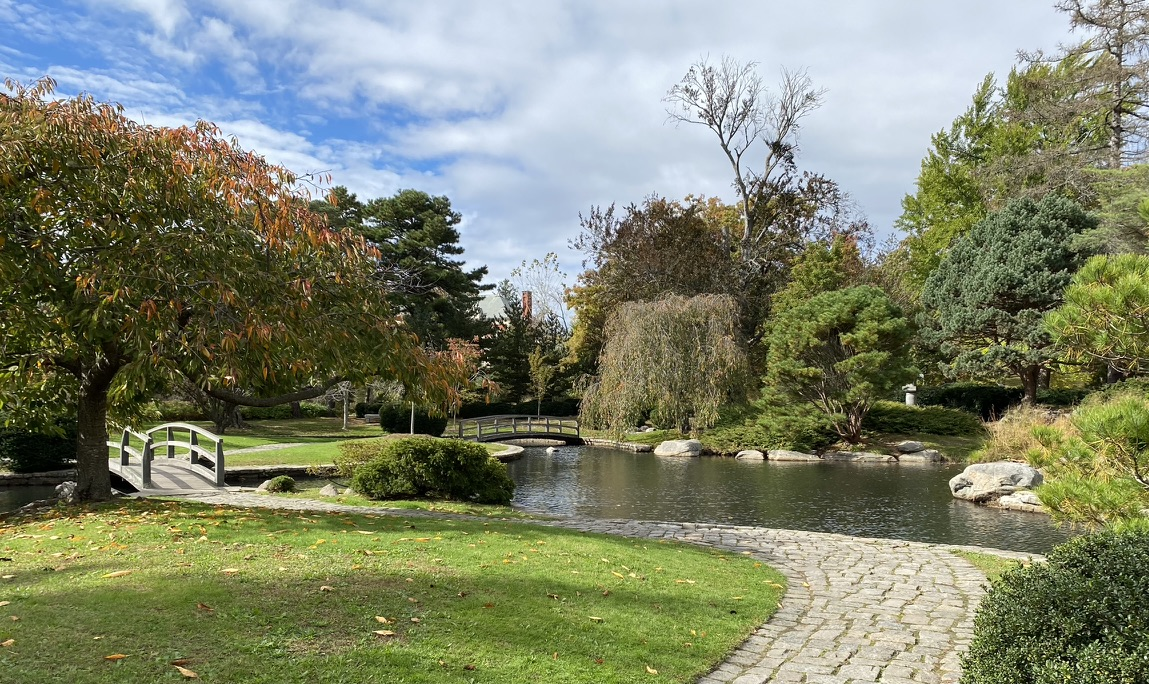
Japanese Garden

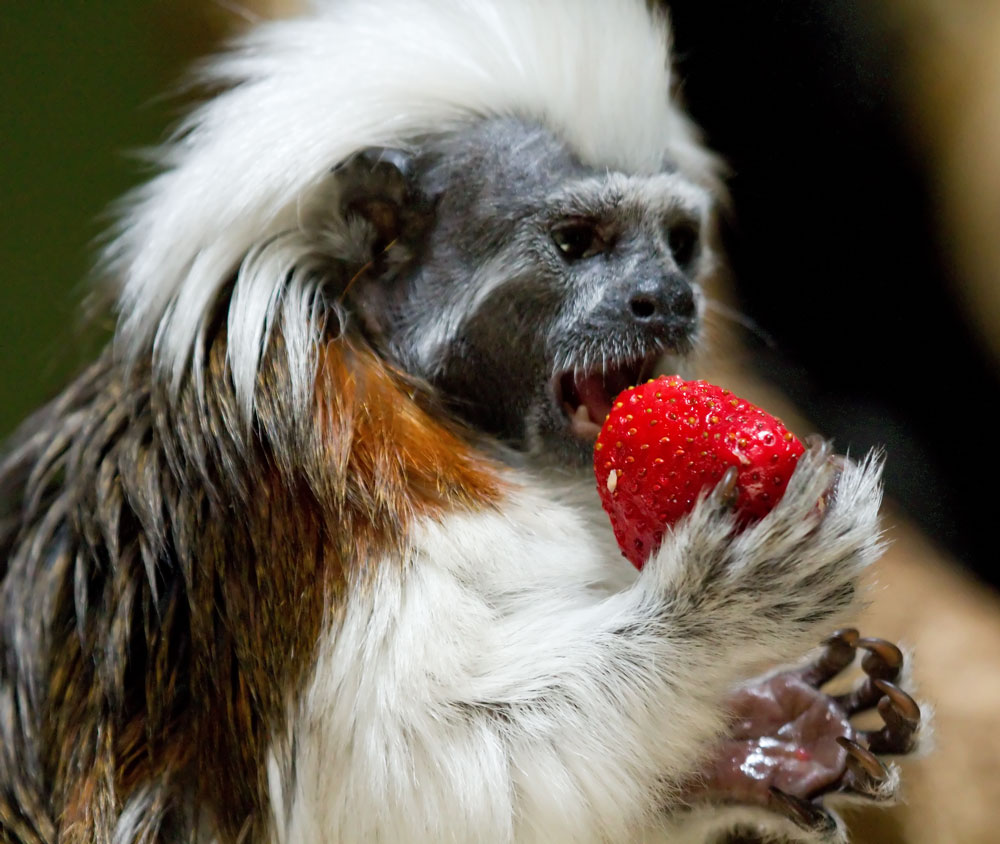
Roger Williams Park Zoo

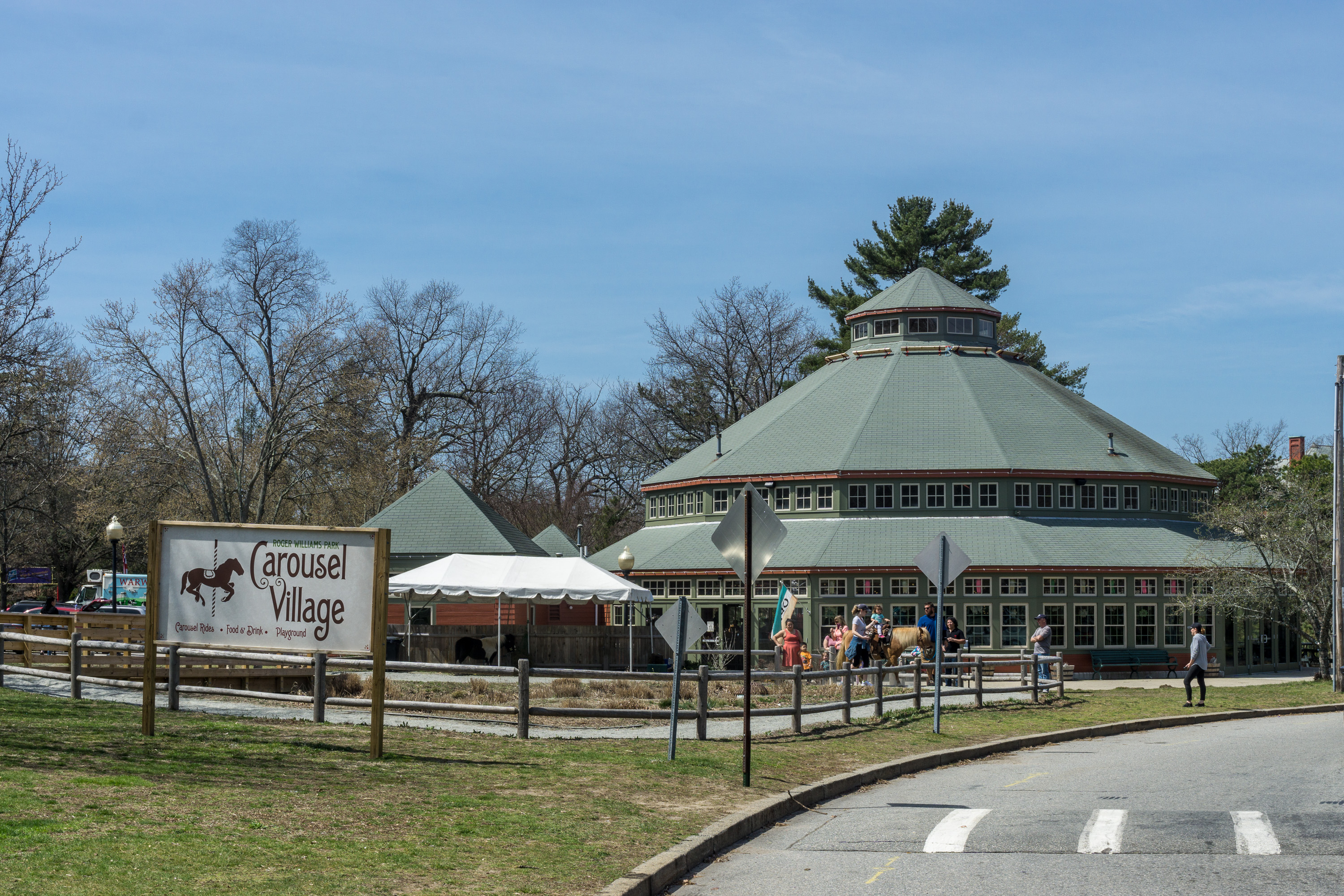
Carousel Village

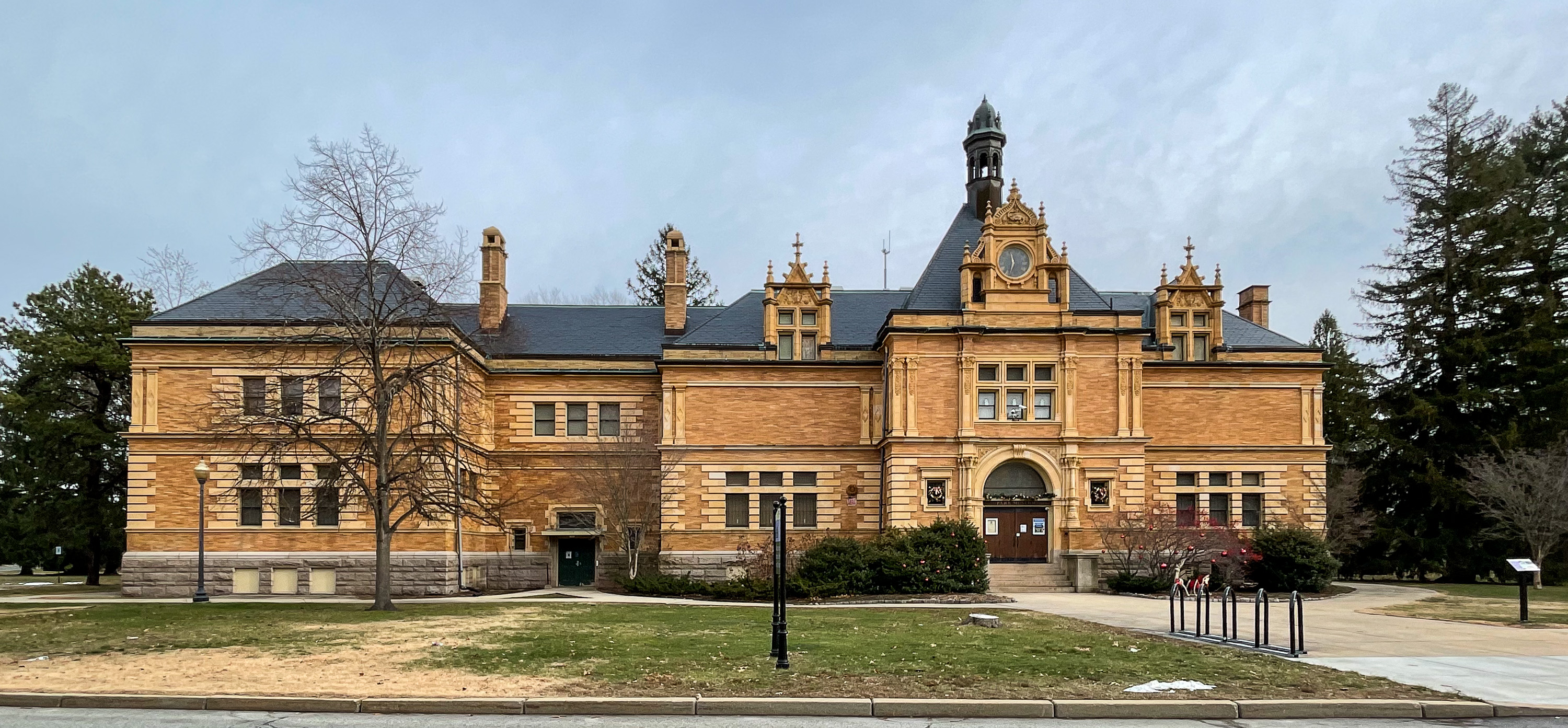
Museum of Natural History and Planetarium

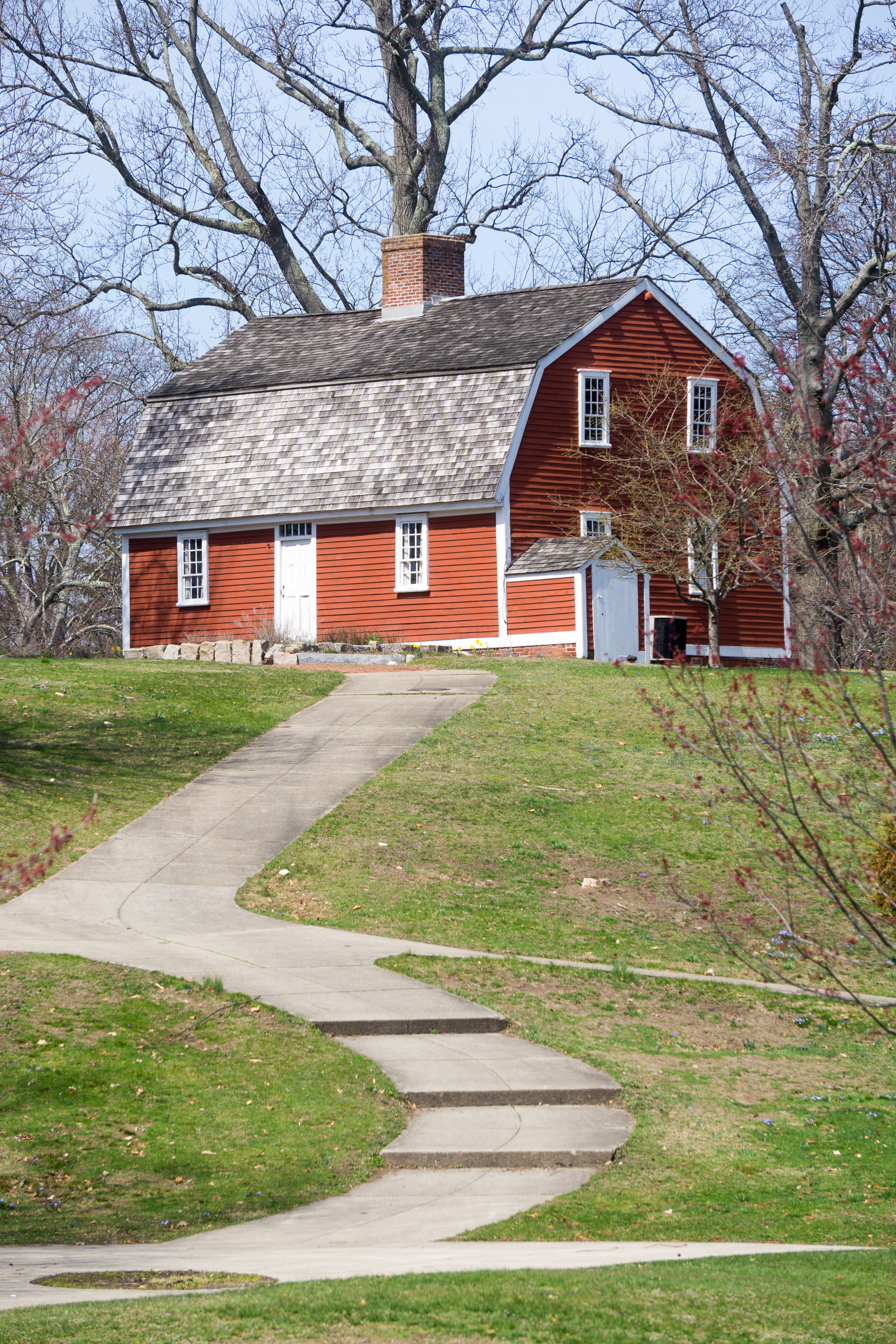
Betsey Williams Cottage (1773)

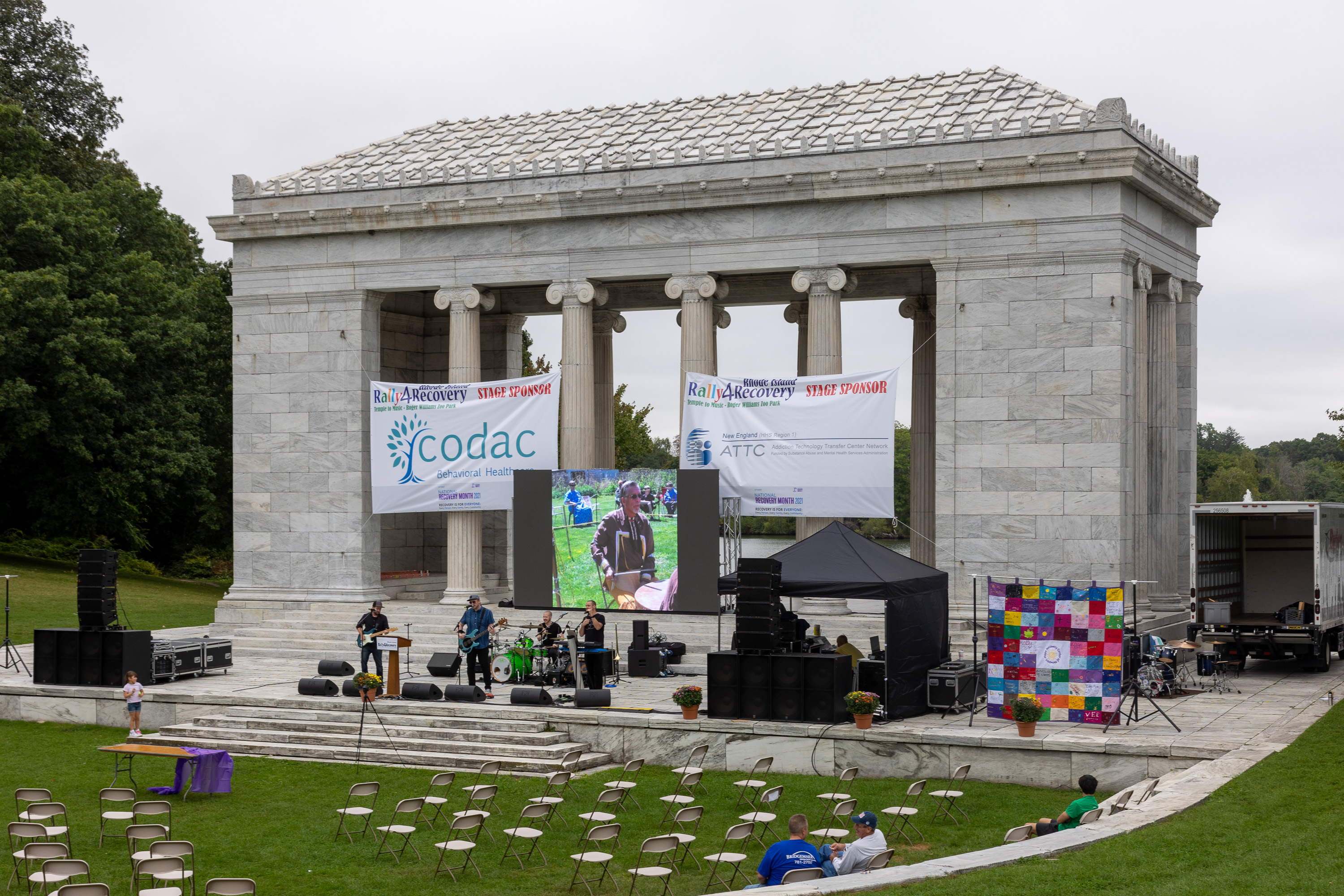
The Temple to Music is the site of community events

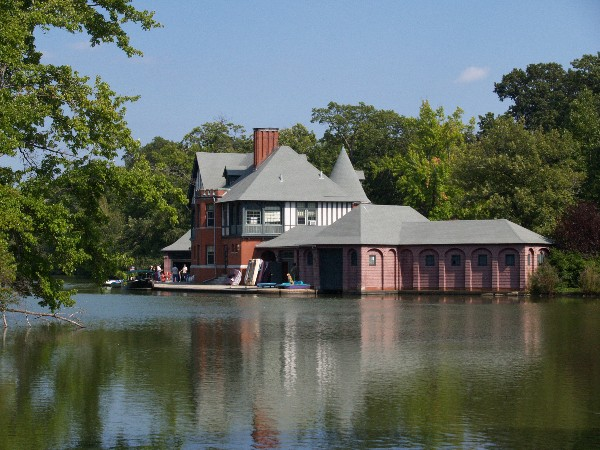
Clark Dalrymple Boathouse (1896)

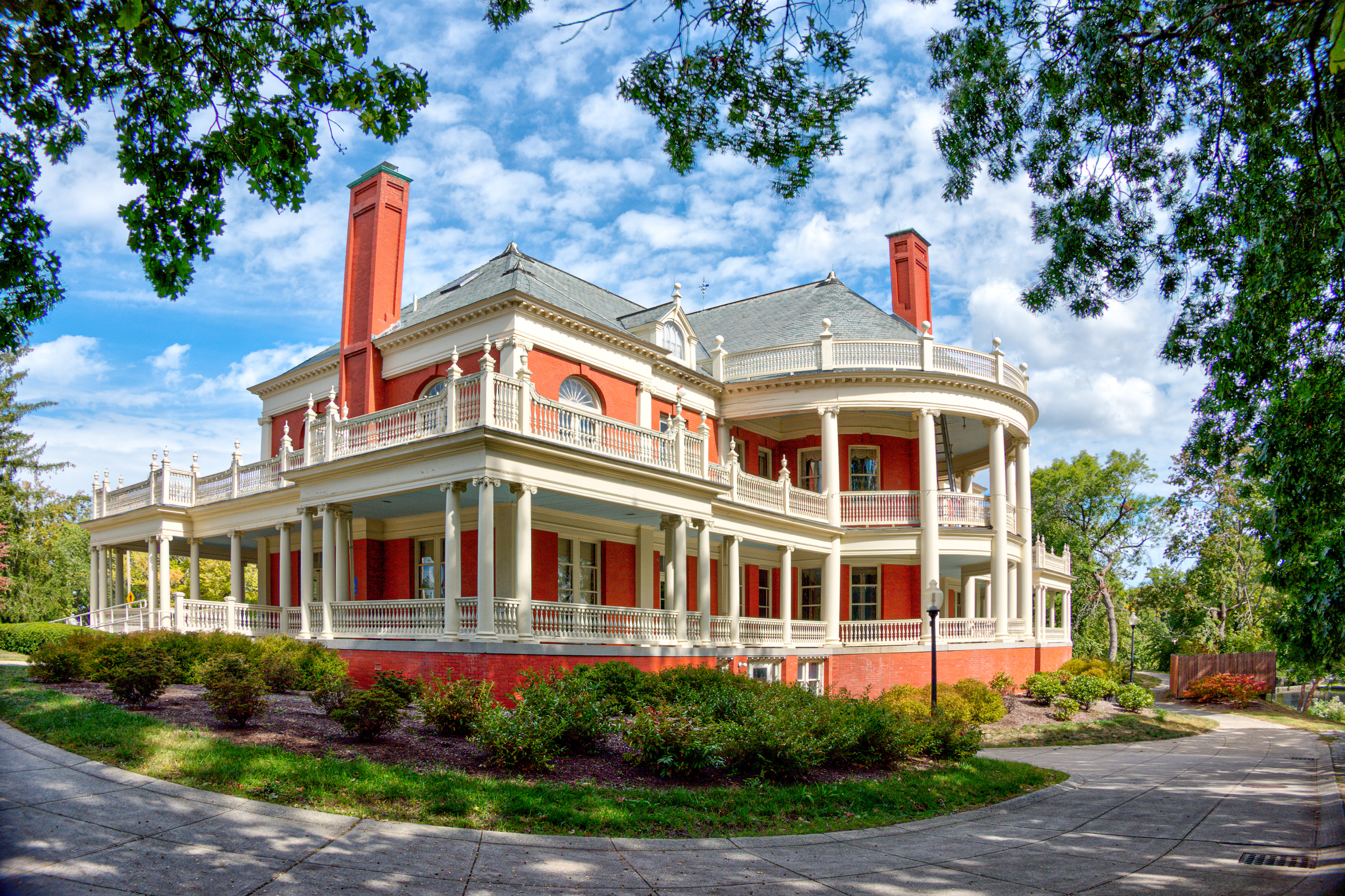
The Casino

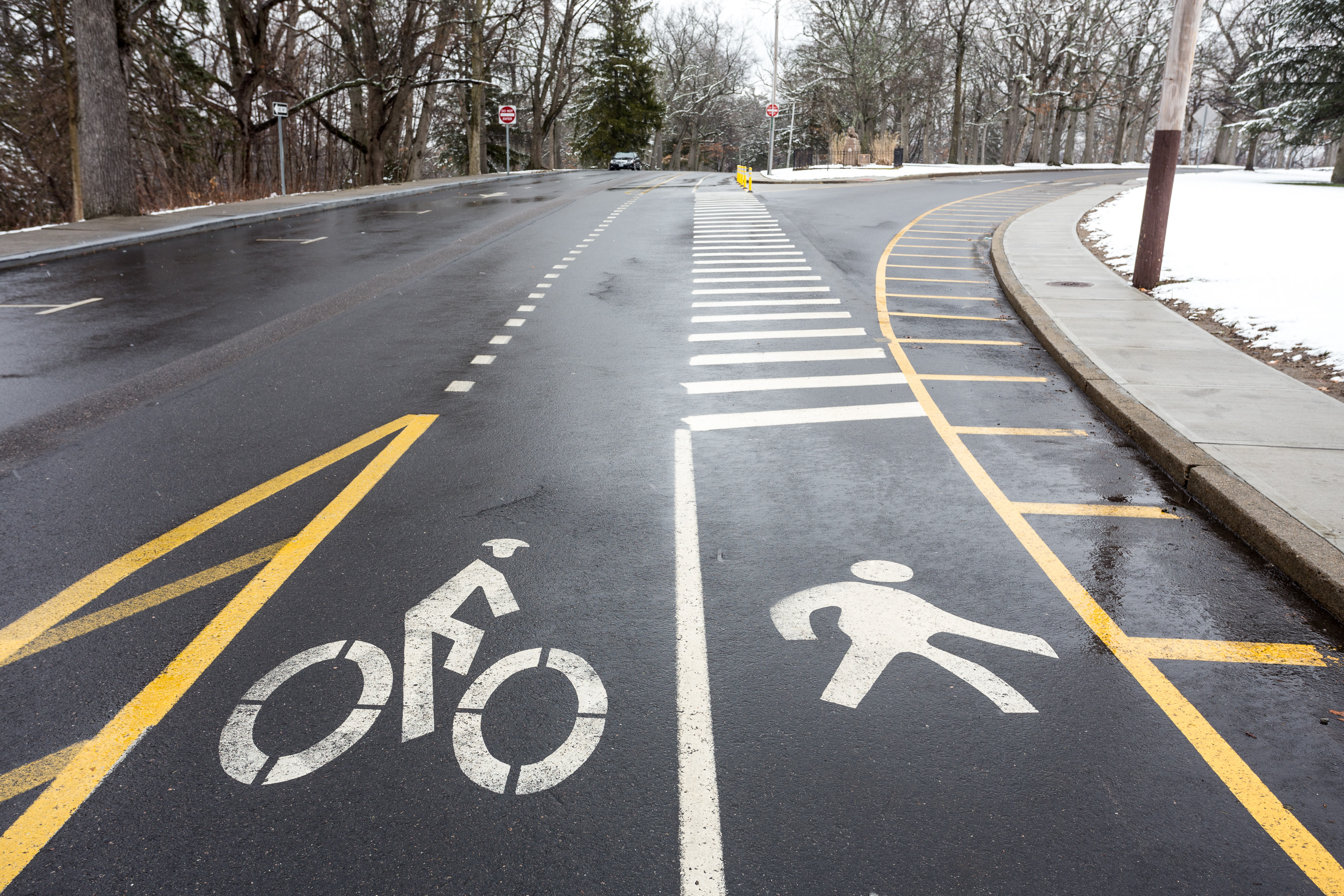
Dedicated lanes for cyclists and runners were installed in 2017

== See also ==
- Roger Williams Park Zoo, third oldest in the U.S., and one of the top 20 zoos in the country
- Roger Williams National Memorial, a distinct park in downtown Providence
- Prospect Terrace Park, park located in Providence's College Hill neighborhood
- National Register of Historic Places listings in Providence, Rhode Island

== In Media ==
Roger Williams Park (or a fictionalized version of it) was featured in the 15th episode of the fourth season of Family Guy "Brian Goes Back to College", first aired November 13, 2005.

== Notes ==
^{Note1} Her headstone name is spelled as "Betsey Williams," but she has been mistakenly called "Betsy" through the centuries, as it appears on numerous articles, postcards, and books.
