= Roger Williams Park Zoo =

Zoo in Providence, Rhode Island; third oldest zoo in the United States

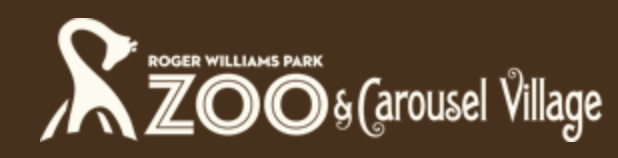
- Interactive map of Roger Williams Park Zoo
- 41.7899°N 71.4163°W
- Date opened: 1872, June 1, 1980 (renovated/expanded)
- Location: Providence, Rhode Island, United States
- Land area: 40 acres
- No. of animals: 800
- No. of species: 160
- Annual visitors: 834,960
- Memberships: AZA
- Major exhibits: Farmyard, Fabric of Africa, Faces of the Rainforest, Feinstein Junior Scholar Wetlands Trail, Himalayan Trek, Wild Woodlands, Coastal Habitat, Our Big Backyard, World of Adaptations
- Website: www.rwpzoo.org

The Roger Williams Park Zoo of Providence, Rhode Island, contains more than 800 animals in natural settings from more than 100 species from around the world. In 1986, the zoo became the first zoo in New England to earn accreditation from the Association of Zoos and Aquariums. Founded in 1872, the zoo is the third oldest zoo in the nation. The zoo and the nearby Carousel Village are some of the main attractions of Roger Williams Park.

== History ==
The Roger Williams Park Zoo first opened in 1872 as a limited collection of small animals, including raccoons, guinea pigs, mice, squirrels, rabbits, hawks, peacocks, and anteaters. Its first building was the Menagerie which opened in 1890. In the 1900s, the facility began to spread out over the entire park, featuring a variety of animals such as monkeys, hoofstock, bears, and big cats. In 1929, the Menagerie building was converted to a birdhouse; this was followed by the opening of an elephant barn in 1930 (which would later be converted to the Tropical America building). In the 1930s, a new sea lion pool was constructed. Bunny Village opened in 1949, one of the zoo's most popular exhibits.

In the mid-1960s, the zoo started to show signs of neglect. In 1962, Sophie Danforth founded the Rhode Island Zoological Society to increase public awareness of the neglect and to raise funds for improvement, and it remains the organization that supports and manages the zoo. The society opened a gift shop and food concessions in 1970, and all funds benefited the zoo. The zoo closed from 1978 to 1980 to undertake an upgrade project. A children's nature center was added, as well as a naturalistic polar bear exhibit, a boardwalk through a wetlands area, and a North American bison exhibit. In the 1980s, a South American Pampas exhibit and a lemur exhibit were built. In 1986, the zoo's old stable/barn - which for many years had been home to the park's workhorses - was converted into an animal hospital, education department, and administrative offices. As a result, the zoo became the first in New England to receive accreditation from the Association of Zoos and Aquariums.

In 1987, a new master plan was formulated to dramatically expand the zoo. Over time, many new exhibits were built, including a new sea lion exhibit (1987), a Humboldt penguin exhibit (1988), Plains of Africa (1991–93), Madagascar (1995), and Marco Polo Trail (1996). In 1989, the old Menagerie building was once again renovated, this time into a new gift shop. A new veterinary hospital opened in the spring of 2011. Hasbro's Our Big Backyard opened in 2012 as an interactive play space, with a second phase completed in 2014 featuring native New England animals. In the summer of 2012, the zoo opened new exhibits for takins, red river hogs, and king vultures.

A new master plan was unveiled in 2015 for the next 20 years. It includes constructing a new rainforest building to be completed in 2018, a new exhibit for Humboldt penguins, a reptile house and a complete reworking of the North America exhibit and front Zoo entrance.

== Animals and exhibits ==
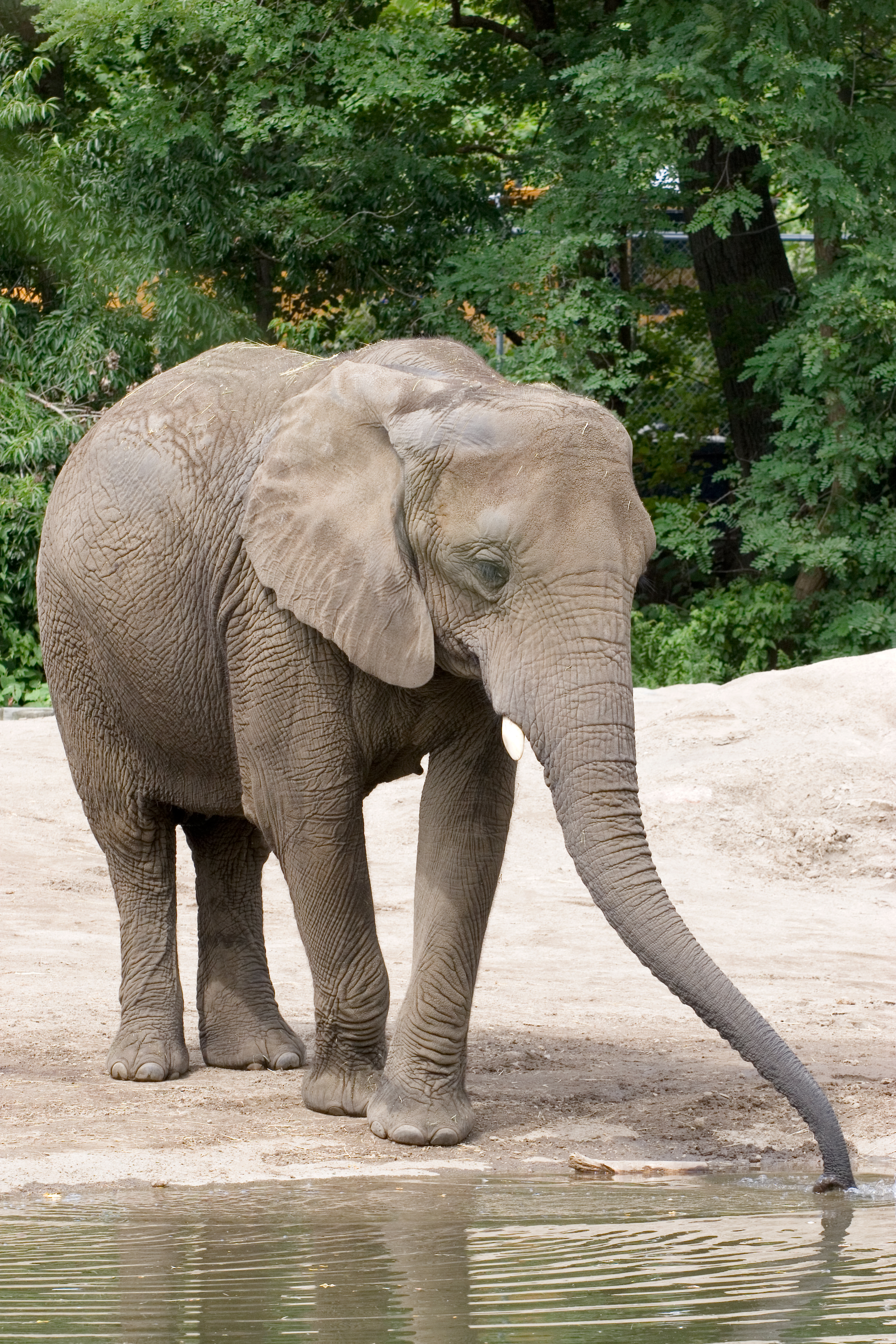
African bush elephant (Loxodonta africana) at the Jambo Junction exhibit.

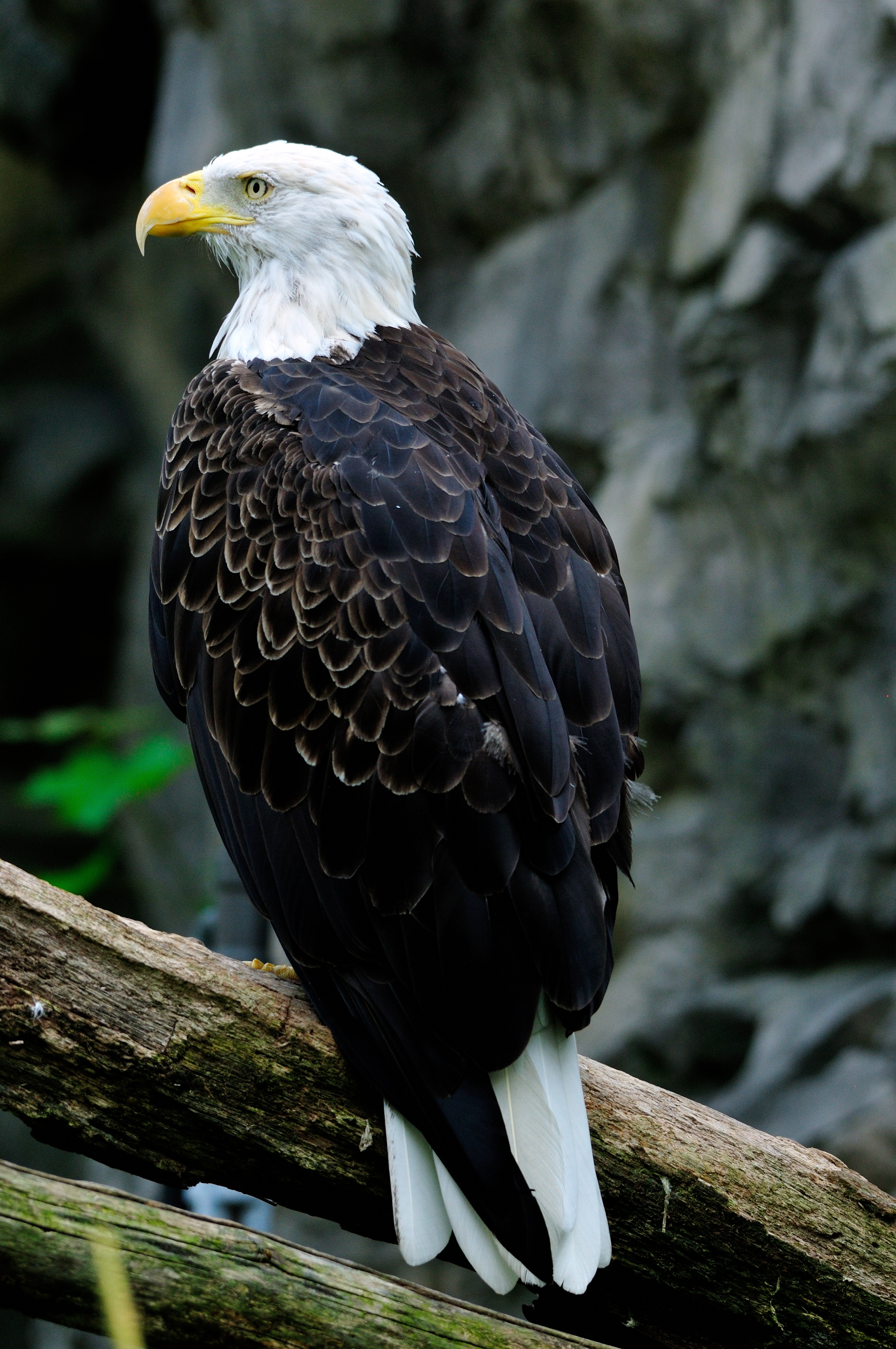
Bald eagle (Haliaeetus leucocephalus) at the North America exhibit.

The zoo is home to more than 100 rare and fascinating animals from around the world. Major exhibits at the zoo include:

- Farmyard: opened in 2014. It serves as a petting zoo where visitors can feed the animals food provided by the zoo. It primarily features domesticated fauna such as Ossabaw Island hogs, Huacaya alpacas, mini Nubian goats, miniature donkeys, and Shetland sheep. It also features wildlife closely associated with farmland, such as barn owls. There are also interactive stations meant to mimic life on a farm, which are sponsored by the local businesses Munroe Dairy, Little Rhody Farms, and Bank RI.
- Fabric of Africa (Lower Savanna): opened in April 1991, expanded in 1993, and renovated in 2008. It is the exhibit closest to the zoo's entrance. It features species indigenous to Africa, including Aldabra giant tortoises, Ankole-Watusi cattles, bat-eared foxes, black crowned cranes, cheetahs, plains zebras, red river hogs, servals, silvery-cheeked hornbills, and blue wildebeest. It also contains Jambo Junction.
- Jambo Junction (Upper Savanna): features African bush elephants and Masai giraffes. Visitors can learn more about how the zoo cares for these large animals in the Elephant & Giraffe Pavilion, an indoor component of Jambo Junction. It is the only zoo in New England that contains elephants, which occupy a 13,500 sq. ft. (1,254.191 sq. meters) enclosure. Though the three elephants they have are all females. The Fabric of Africa was renovated in 2008 to revamp Jambo Junction, specifically to better accommodate the elephants. Jambo Junction is sponsored by the Robert F. Stoico/FIRSTFED Charitable Foundation and Textron.
- Faces of the Rainforest: A state-of-the-art building first opened in 2018 for neotropical life featuring a free-flight aviary, cascading waterfall, open concept primate habitat and more. Animals in and around the building include black howler monkeys, Bolivian gray titis, Chilean flamingos, dyeing poison dart frogs, giant anteaters, giant otters, golden lion tamarins, green anacondas, hyacinth macaws, keel-billed toucans, Linnaeus's two-toed sloths, piranhas, scarlet ibises, southern tamanduas, sunbitterns, white-faced sakis, yellow-banded poison dart frogs, and yellow-rumped caciques.
- Feinstein Junior Scholar Wetlands Trail: a walk through area that reflects the natural wetland environments of Rhode Island, which are becoming increasingly rarer as the state continues to be urbanized. All wildlife is indigenous to Rhode Island, and while the animals are protected by the zoo they are not the property of them. It is known to feature Canada geese, great blue herons, several species of freshwater fish and turtles, and wood ducks. The trail is sponsored by the Feinstein Junior Scholar through the local Feinstein Foundation. There is also an exhibit for Reeves's muntjacs at the start of the trail.
- Himalayan Trek: opened in 1996 under the name Marco Polo's Adventure Trek (the name was changed in 2024). It is one of two areas to focus on animals from Asia. It features fauna encountered (or likely to have been encountered) by the explorer Marco Polo, including Bactrian camels, moon bears, red-crowned cranes, red pandas, Sichuan takins, and snow leopards.
- Wild Woodlands (formerly called North America until 2024): features American bison, bald eagles, black vultures, golden eagles, northern copperhead snakes, pronghorns, red wolves, timber rattlesnakes, turkey vultures and wild turkeys.
- Our Big Backyard: an interactive live play space for children and families. The exhibit promotes outdoor, free-ended play. The playspace is funded by the toy company Hasbro and the pharmaceutical company CVS Health. There is also an aviary for common ravens.
- World of Adaptations (Adaptations) (formerly Australasia): it features animals primarily from Southeast Asia and Oceania, including Australian snake-necked turtles, Bali mynas, Bennett's wallabies, eastern rosellas, emerald tree boas, Indian blue peafowl, king vultures, Komodo dragons, laughing kookaburras, Matschie's tree kangaroos, North American river otters, North Sulawesi babirusa, northern white-cheeked gibbons, Palawan binturongs, radiated tortoises and wrinkled hornbills. The Komodo dragon at the zoo is the first of its kind in New England.
- Penguin Point (Coastal Habitat) Penguin Point opened in 2025, and the only animals displayed there are the Humboldt penguins. They can be viewed through an underwater window.

== Gallery ==
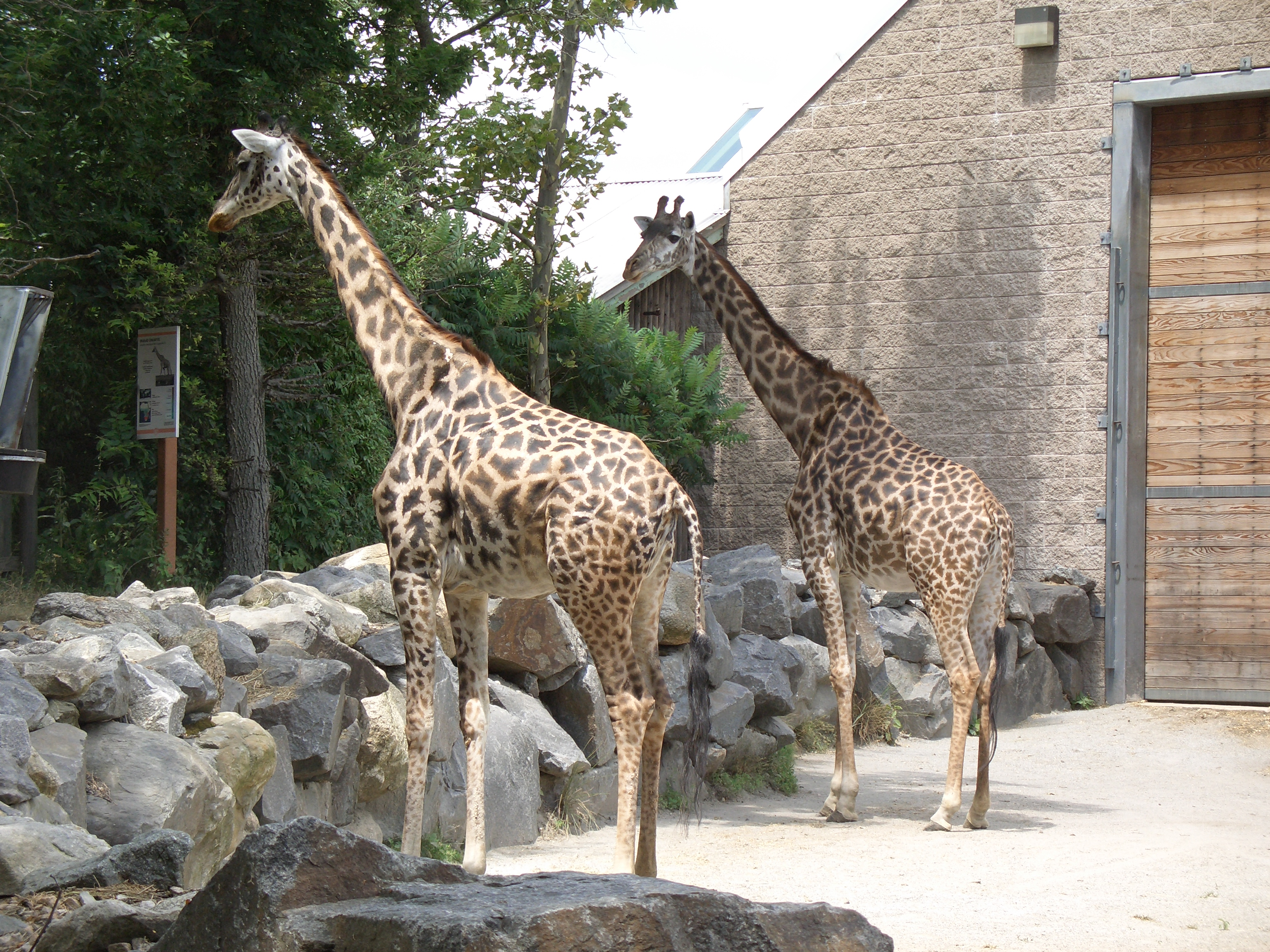
Masai giraffe

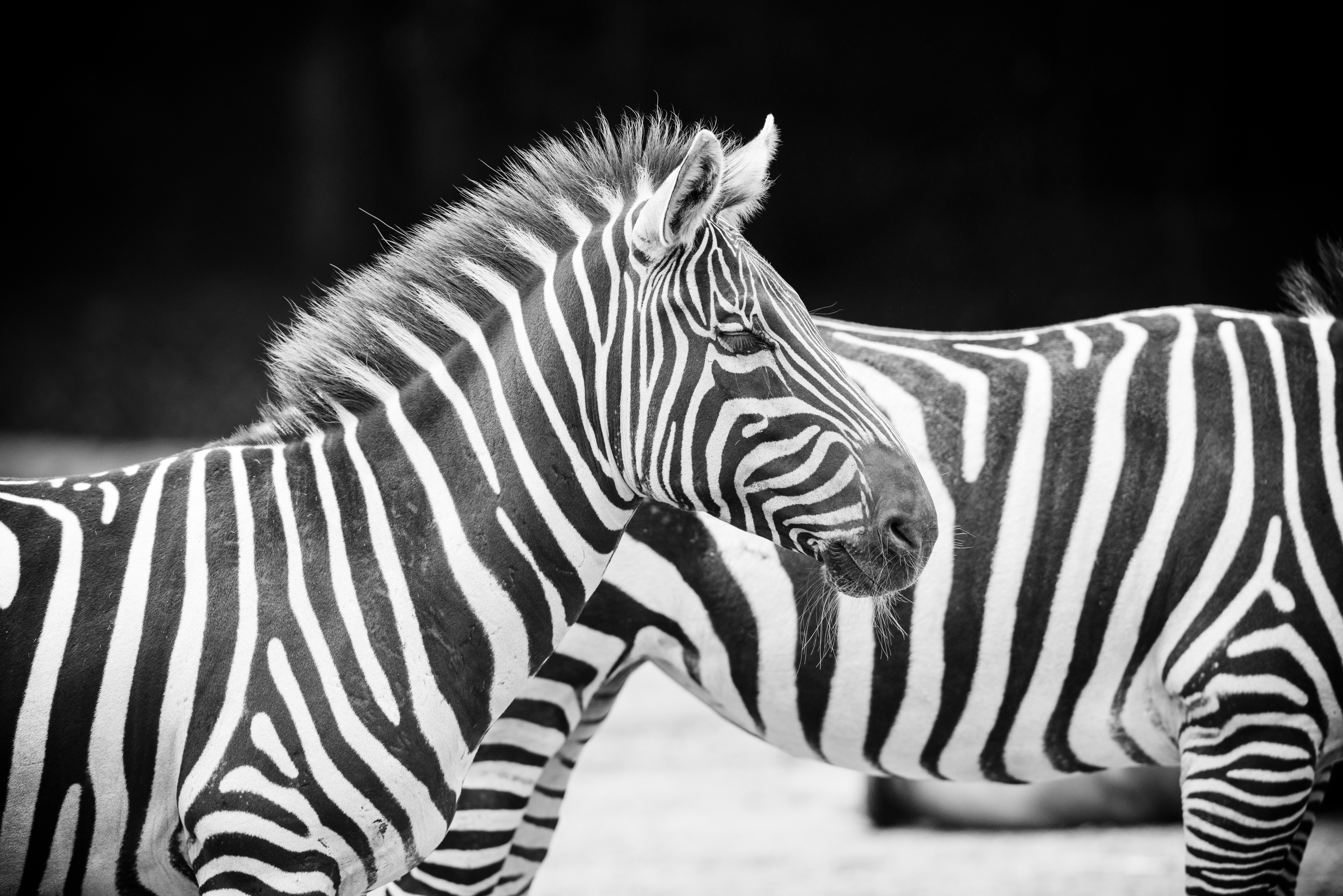
Zebras

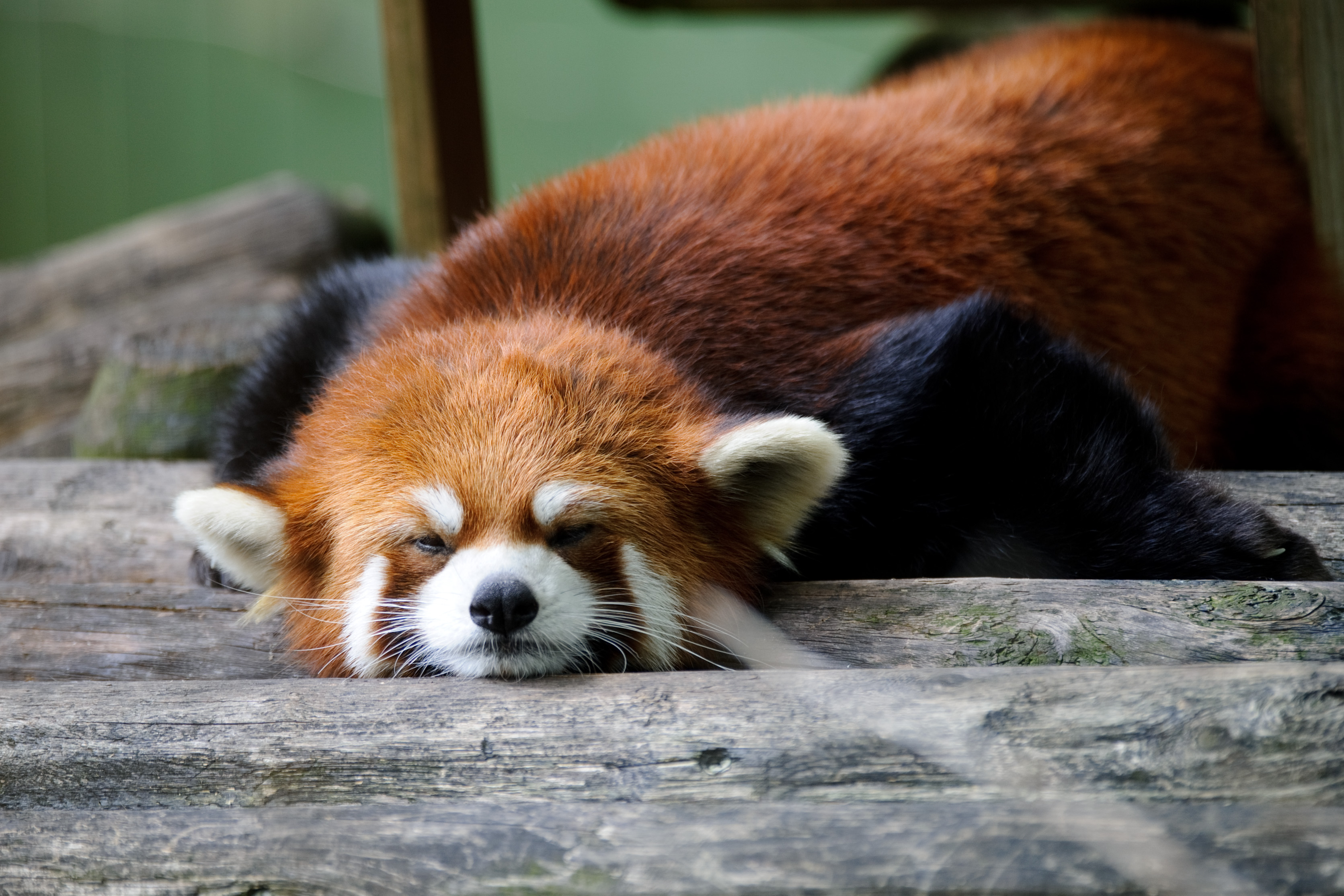
Red panda (Ailurus fulgens).

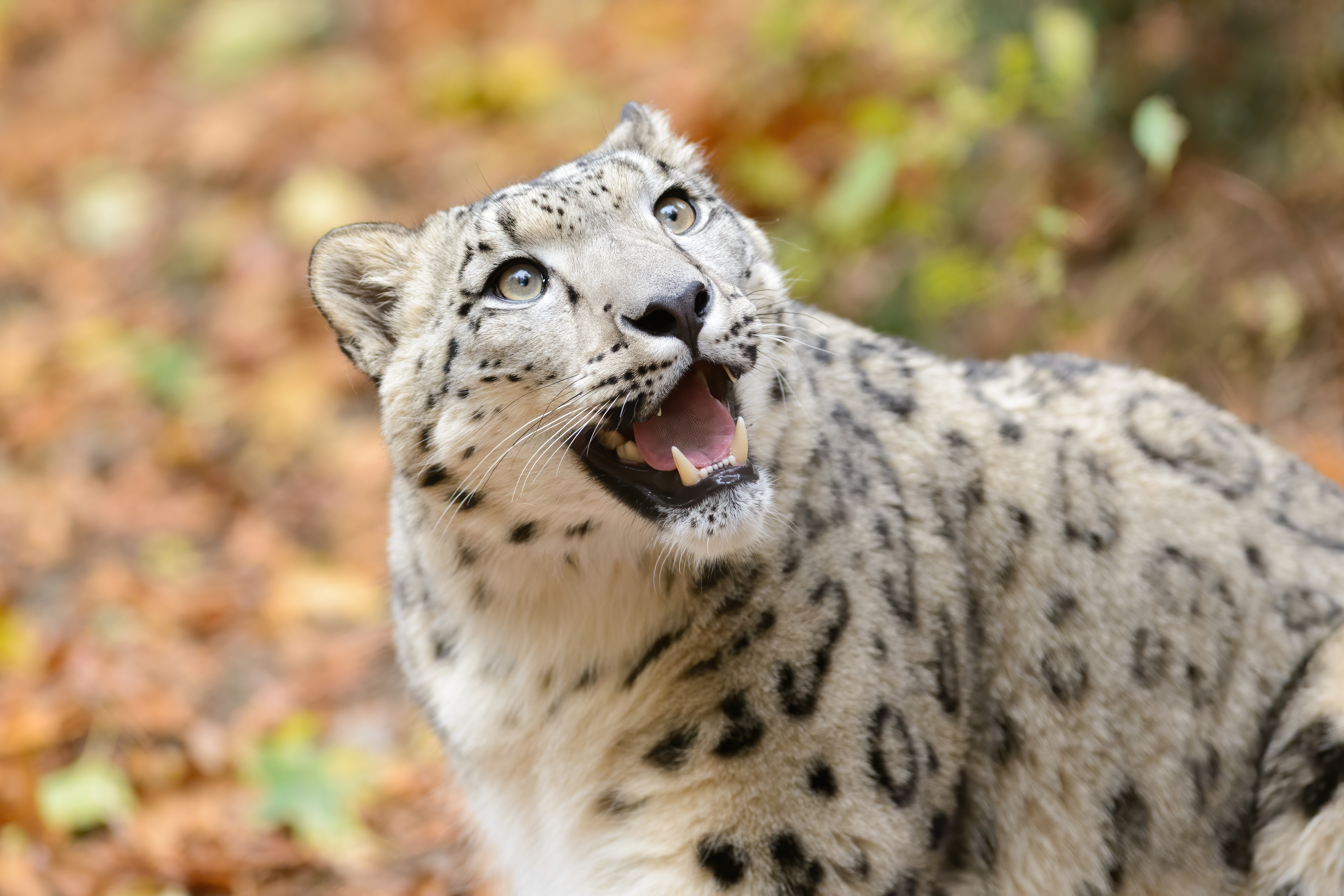
Snow leopard

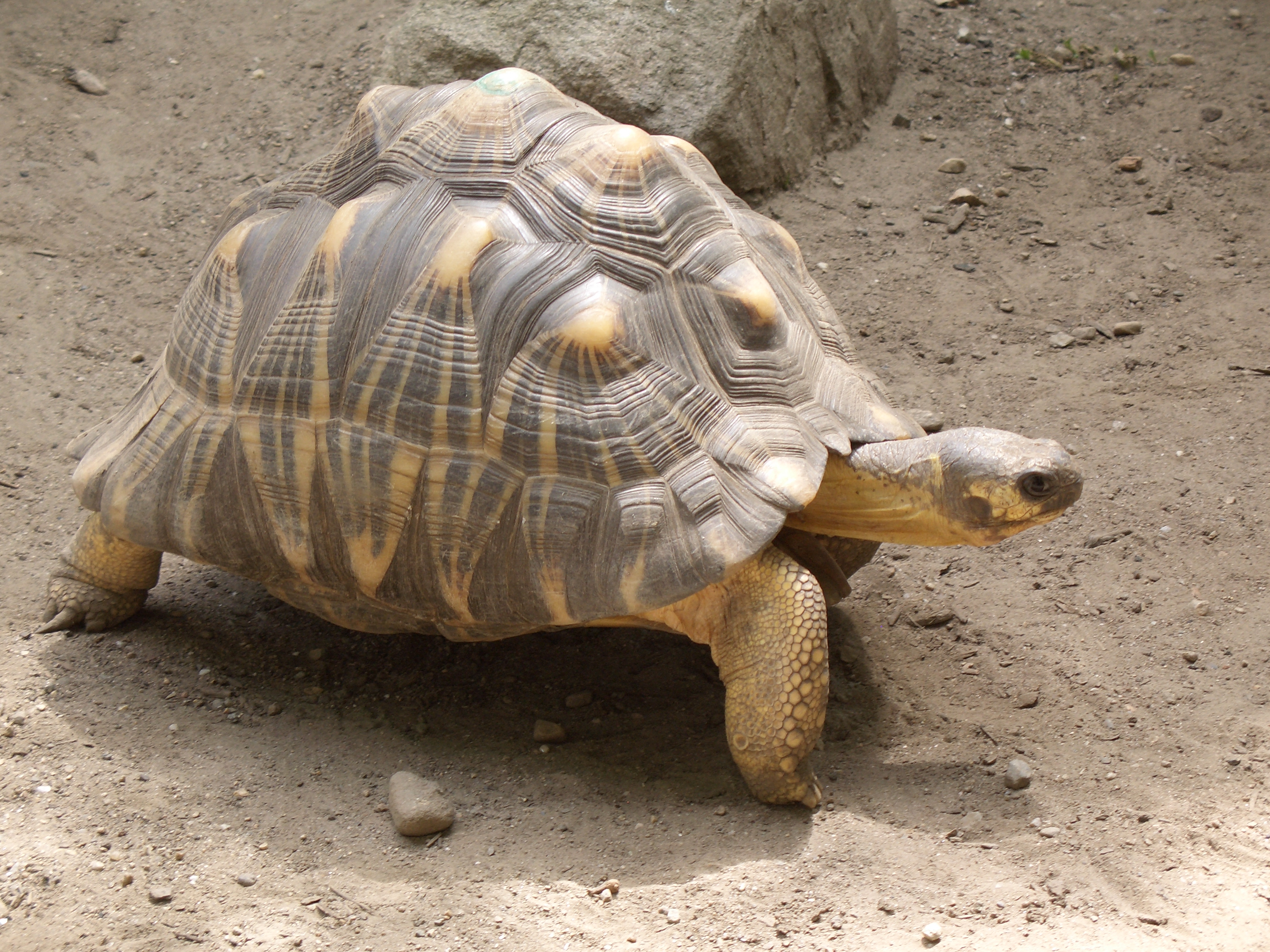
Radiated tortoise

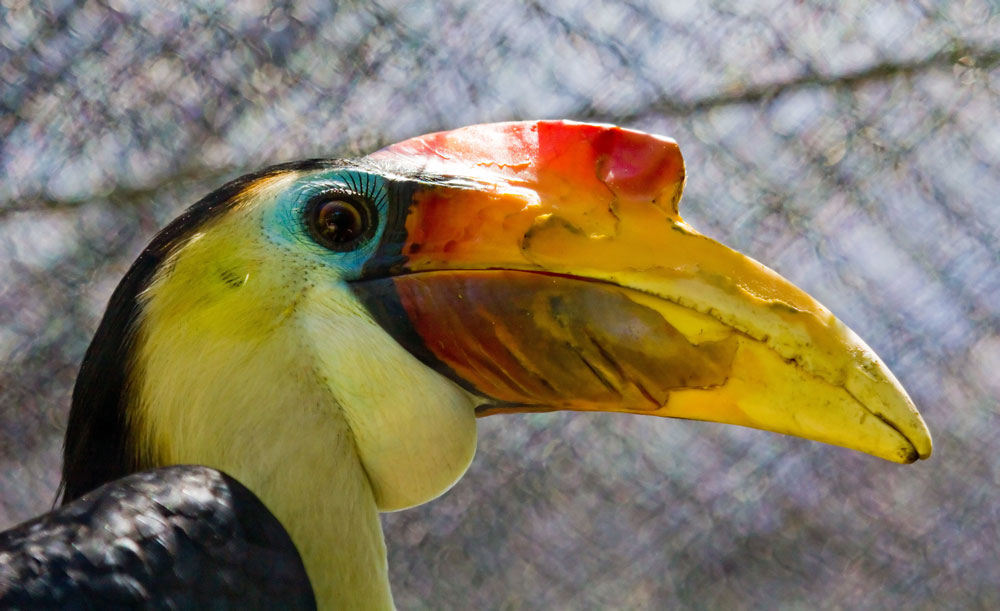
Wrinkled hornbill

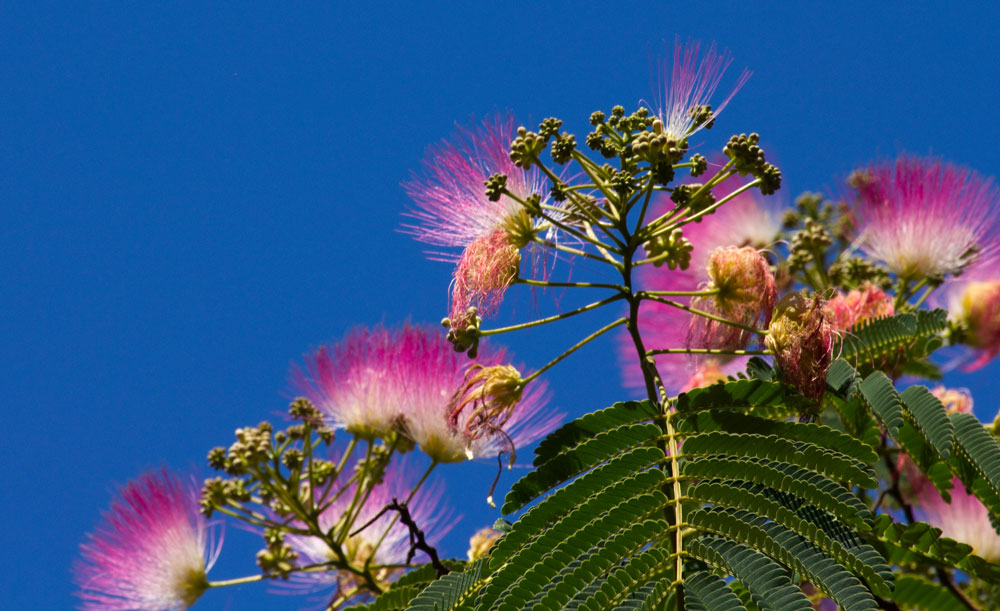
One of the many flowering plants at the zoo.

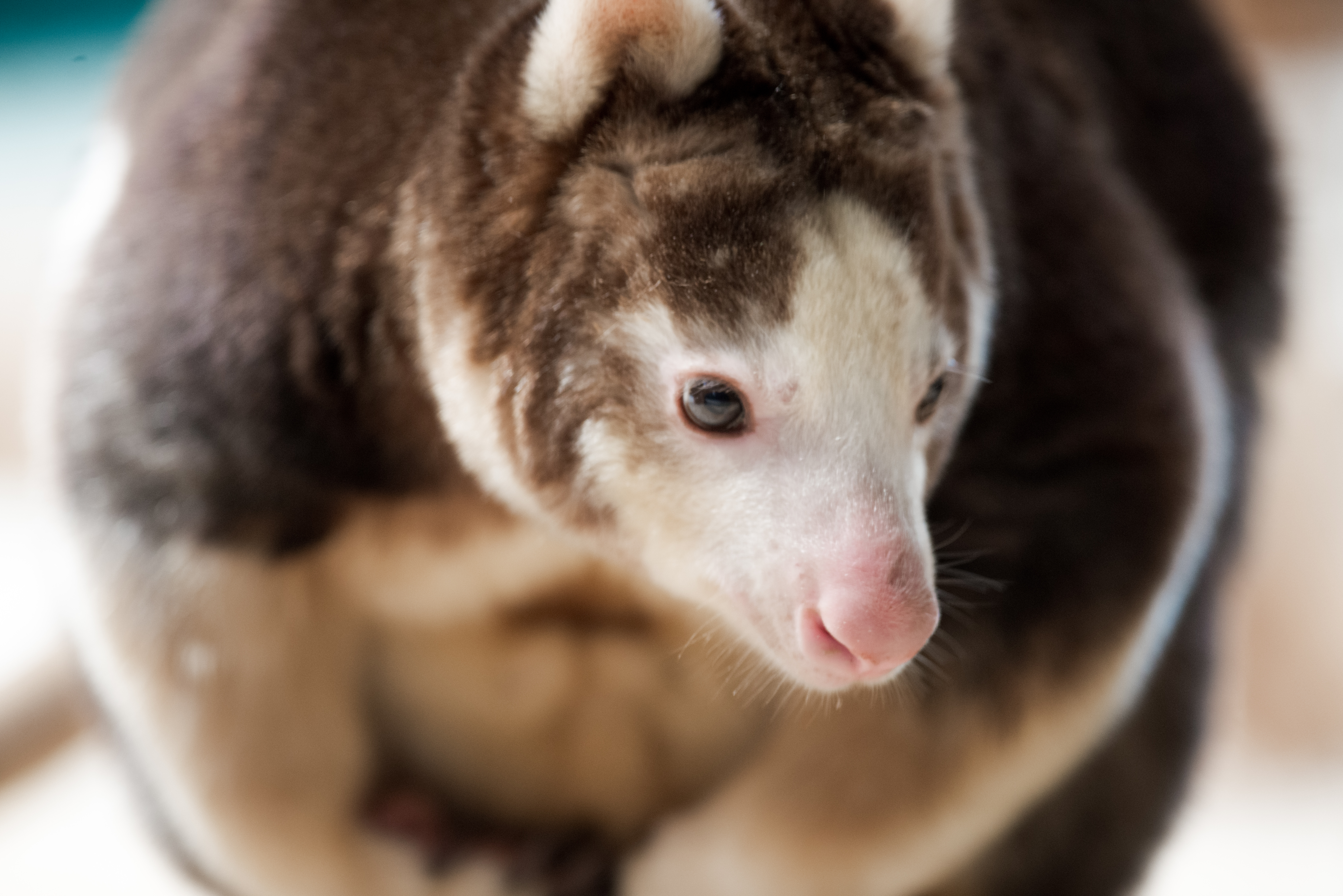
Matschie's tree kangaroo

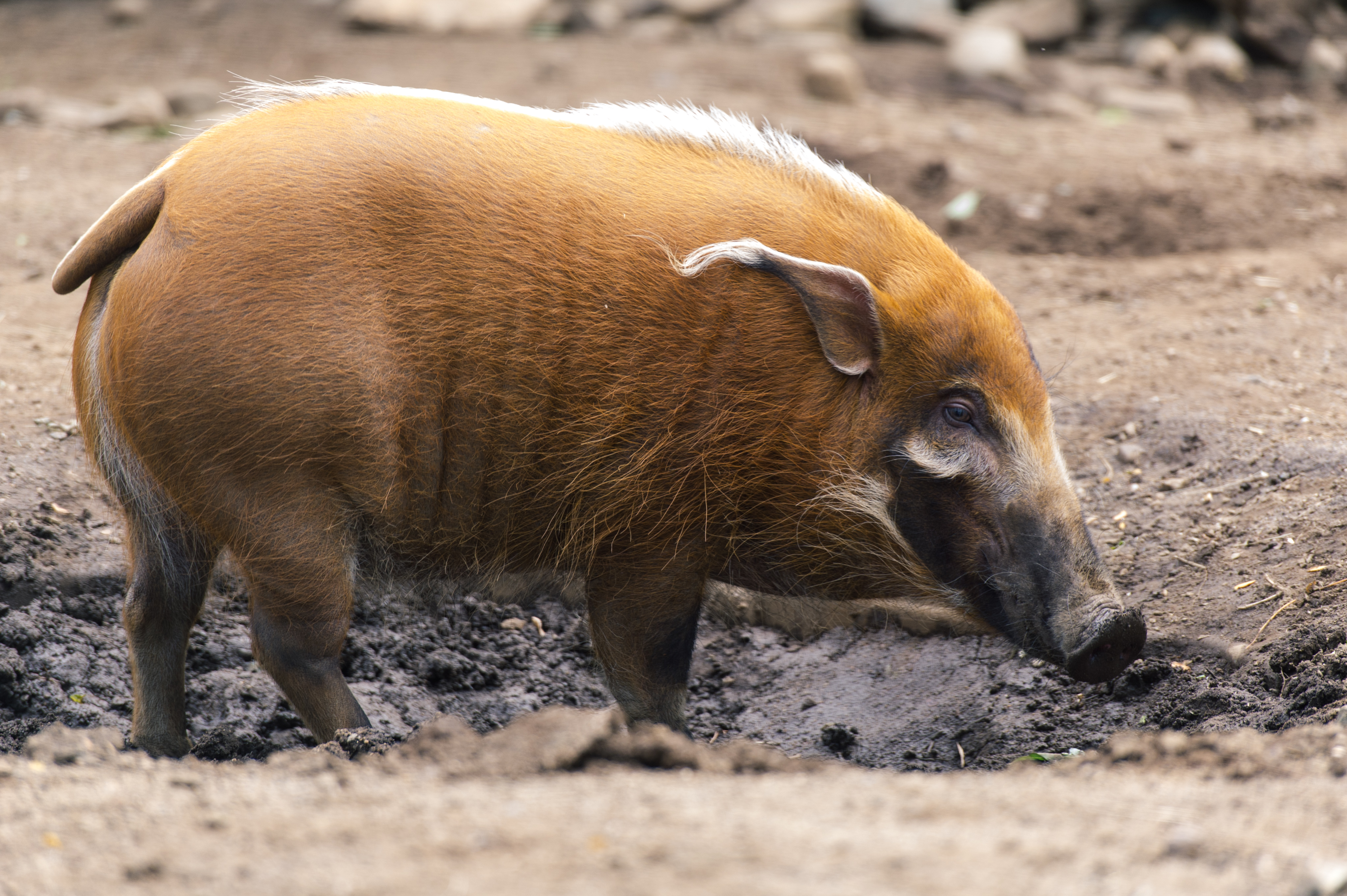
Red river hog

== See also ==
- Roger Williams Park
- Roger Williams
- Roger Williams National Memorial
