= List of The Fairly OddParents episodes =

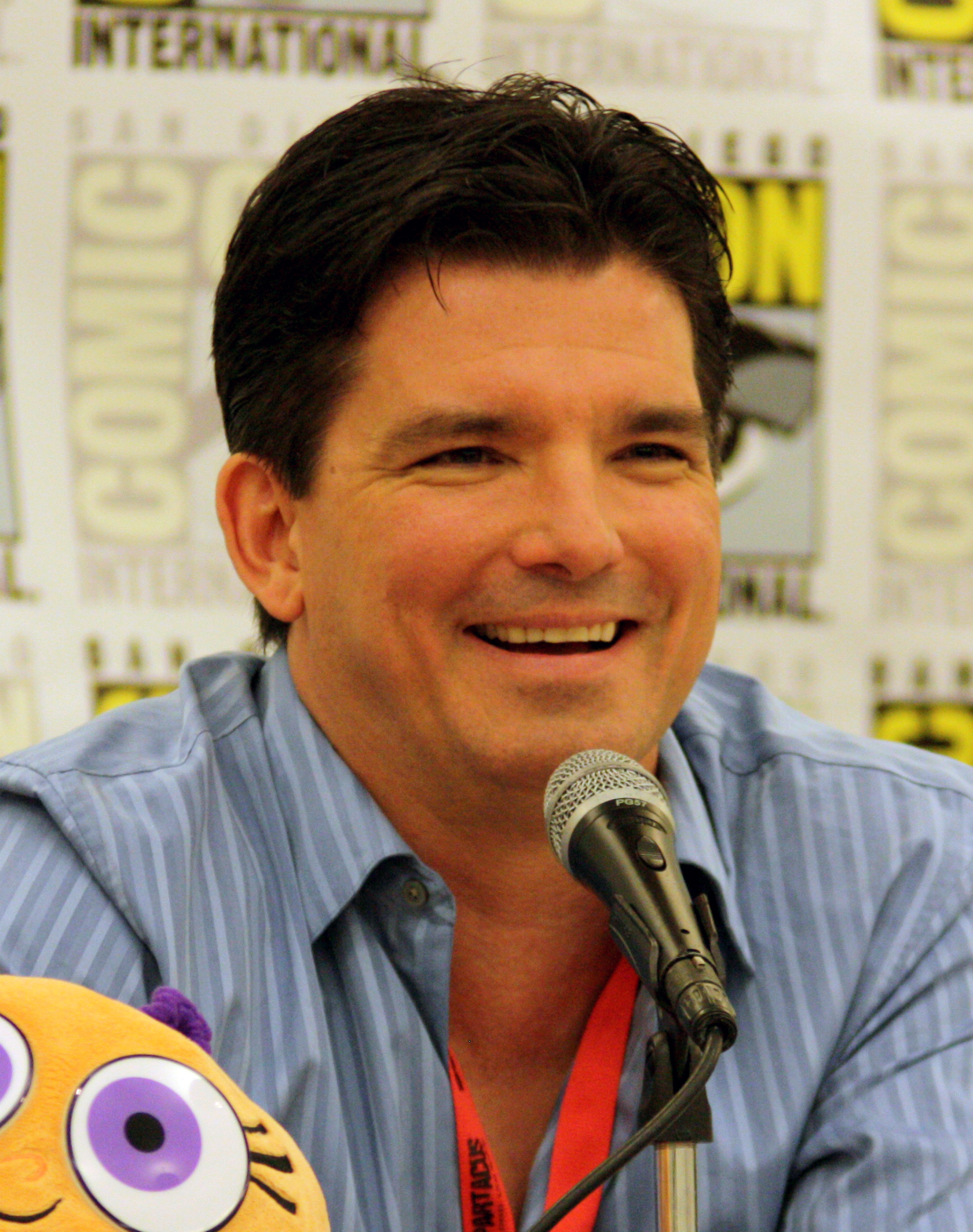
Butch Hartman, shown here in 2009, created The Fairly OddParents, which premiered on March 30, 2001.

The Fairly OddParents is an American animated television series created by Butch Hartman for Nickelodeon. The series follows the adventures of Timmy Turner, a 10-year-old boy who is neglected by his parents and abused by his babysitter, Vicky, and schoolteacher, Denzel Crocker. One day, he is granted two fairy godparents named Cosmo and Wanda who grant him his every wish to improve his miserable life. However, these wishes usually backfire and cause a series of problems that Timmy must fix.

Prior to the creation of The Fairly OddParents, Hartman was working at Cartoon Network on Dexter's Laboratory and Johnny Bravo. The series is based on a series of Frederator's Oh Yeah! Cartoons, beginning with the short "The Fairly OddParents!". From 1998 until 2002, the Oh Yeah! Cartoons series aired ten Fairly OddParents shorts with a run time of seven and a half minutes each. The show's success has spanned three Jimmy Timmy Power Hour crossover movies and three full-length live-action films. Notable television films include "Abra-Catastrophe", which aired in 2003, and "Channel Chasers", which aired a year later in 2004. The latest live-action film, A Fairly Odd Summer was released in 2014. The first eight seasons, with the help of Amazon, were released on DVD in 2011. After a year-long hiatus, the series returned in 2013 with its ninth season, which began airing on March 23, 2013 with the half-hour special "Fairly OddPet".

On August 17, 2015, a tenth season was officially announced, and it introduced another new character named Chloe Carmichael, Timmy's new neighbor who also has Cosmo and Wanda as her fairy godparents due to a fairy shortage. On December 30, 2015, Nickelodeon's Twitter posted the new character's picture, and the Season 10 premiere date, January 15, 2016. The series moved to Nicktoons in 2017 to air the remainder of Season 10, which switched to Flash animation beginning with its fourteenth episode.

The final episode aired on July 26, 2017. A live-action sequel of the series premiered on Paramount+ on March 31, 2022. An animated sequel series was released in 2024.

== Series overview ==
Season	Episodes		Segments	Originally released		
Season	Episodes		Segments	First released	Last released	Network
Shorts	10		N/A	September 6, 1998	March 23, 2001	Nickelodeon
1	7		13	March 30, 2001	December 9, 2001	Nickelodeon
2	13		24	March 1, 2002	January 20, 2003	Nickelodeon
3	19		33	November 8, 2002	November 21, 2003	Nickelodeon
4	20		32	November 7, 2003	June 10, 2005	Nickelodeon
5	21		37	July 2, 2004	November 25, 2006	Nickelodeon
6	20		30	February 18, 2008	August 12, 2009	Nickelodeon
7	20		39	July 6, 2009	August 5, 2012	Nickelodeon
8	6		N/A	February 12, 2011	December 29, 2011	Nickelodeon
9	26		43	March 23, 2013	March 28, 2015	Nickelodeon
10	20 (Note: 37 segments total)	9	15	January 15, 2016	September 16, 2016	Nickelodeon
10	20	11	22	January 18, 2017	July 26, 2017	Nicktoons

== Episodes ==
All of the episodes of The Fairly OddParents listed below are arranged in the order of the complete series DVD set, rather than their original production, broadcast or packaging order.

=== Shorts (1998–2002) ===
No.	Title	Story by	Original release date	Prod. code
1	"The Fairly OddParents!"	Butch Hartman	September 6, 1998	YEA−627
2	"Too Many Timmys!"	Butch Hartman	September 18, 1999	YEA−719
3	"Where's the Wand?"	Butch Hartman, Zac Moncrief & Bob Boyle	September 18, 1999	TBA
4	"Party of Three!"	Butch Hartman	October 16, 1999	YEA−717
5	"The Fairy Flu!"	Mike Bell	October 30, 1999	YEA−720
6	"The Temp!"	Butch Hartman & Steve Marmel	November 13, 1999	YEA−725
7	"The Zappys!"	Butch Hartman & Steve Marmel	November 20, 1999	TBA
8	"Scout's Honor"	Butch Hartman & Steve Marmel	April 6, 2002	TBA
9	"Super Humor"	Butch Hartman, Steve Marmel & Mike Bell	June 6, 2002 (Nicktoons)	TBA
10	"The Really Bad Day!"	Butch Hartman & Steve Marmel	June 9, 2002 (Nicktoons)	TBA

=== Season 1 (2001) ===
Clips from The Big Problem!, the first episode of Season 1

No. overall	No. in season	Title	Directed by	Written by	Storyboard by	Original release date	Prod. code	Viewers (millions)
1	1	"The Big Problem!"	Butch Hartman & Jaime Diaz	Steve Marmel	Butch Hartman & Bernie Petterson	March 30, 2001	FOP−101	3.59 2.30 (HH) (Note: (HH) indicates the amount of households an episode was viewed in when it premiered.)
1	1	"Power Mad!"	Butch Hartman	Story by : Mike Bell & Steve Marmel; Teleplay by : Steve Marmel	Butch Hartman	March 30, 2001	FOP−104	3.59 2.30 (HH)
2	2	"Spaced Out"	Butch Hartman	Mike Bell, Butch Hartman & Steve Marmel	Butch Hartman & Barry Bunce	April 6, 2001	FOP−102	2.64
2	2	"TransParents!"	Butch Hartman & Larry Leichliter	Butch Hartman & Steve Marmel	Butch Hartman & Joe Daniello	April 6, 2001	FOP−105	2.64
3	3	"Chin Up!"	Butch Hartman	Steve Marmel	Paul McEvoy & Butch Hartman	April 27, 2001	FOP−106	2.17
3	3	"Dog's Day Afternoon"	Butch Hartman & Larry Leichliter	Steve Marmel	Paul McEvoy & Butch Hartman	April 27, 2001	FOP−103	2.17
4	4	"A Wish Too Far!"	Butch Hartman	Steve Marmel	Butch Hartman & Erik Wiese	April 13, 2001	FOP−109	2.93
4	4	"Tiny Timmy!"	Butch Hartman and Larry Leichliter	Story by : Butch Hartman, Mike Bell & Steve Marmel; Teleplay by : Steve Marmel	Paul McEvoy	April 13, 2001	FOP−108	2.93
5	5	"Father Time!"	Butch Hartman & Jaime Diaz	Butch Hartman & Steve Marmel	John Fountain & Butch Hartman	April 20, 2001	FOP−107	2.37
5	5	"Apartnership!"	Butch Hartman	Butch Hartman & Steve Marmel	John Fountain & Butch Hartman	April 20, 2001	FOP−112	2.37
6	6	"Dream Goat!"	Butch Hartman & Larry Leichliter	Story by : Butch Hartman, Mike Bell & Steve Marmel; Teleplay by : Steve Marmel	John Fountain	May 4, 2001	FOP−110	2.41
6	6	"The Same Game"	Butch Hartman	Butch Hartman & Steve Marmel	Paul McEvoy & Butch Hartman	May 4, 2001	FOP−111	2.41
7	7	"Christmas Everyday!"	Butch Hartman	Story by : Butch Hartman, Tracy Berna & Steve Marmel; Teleplay by : Butch Hartman & Steve Marmel	Butch Hartman & Bob Boyle	December 9, 2001	FOP−124	2.65
7	7	"Christmas Everyday!"	Butch Hartman	Story by : Butch Hartman, Tracy Berna & Steve Marmel; Teleplay by : Butch Hartman & Steve Marmel	Butch Hartman & Bob Boyle	December 9, 2001	FOP−125 (Note: This episode was originally produced for the second season, and was a part of the season 2 DVD set. However, digital outlets label this episode as part of season 1.)	2.65

=== Season 2 (2002–03) ===
No. overall	No. in season	Title	Directed by	Written by	Storyboard by	Original release date	Prod. code	Viewers (millions)
8	1	"Boys in the Band"	Butch Hartman	Butch Hartman & Steve Marmel	Butch Hartman & Paul McEvoy	March 1, 2002	FOP−118	3.15
8	1	"Hex Games"	Butch Hartman	Tim O'Rourke	Bob Boyle	March 1, 2002	FOP−113	3.15
9	2	"Boy Toy"	Butch Hartman	Butch Hartman & Steve Marmel	Butch Hartman & Jim Schumann	March 8, 2002	FOP−116	3.35
9	2	"Inspection Detection"	Butch Hartman	Story by : Butch Hartman & Steve Marmel; Teleplay by : Spencer Green	Butch Hartman	March 8, 2002	FOP−117	3.35
10	3	"Action Packed"	John Fountain & Butch Hartman	Tracy Berna & Steve Marmel	John Fountain	March 22, 2002	FOP−115	3.14
10	3	"Smarty Pants"	John Fountain & Butch Hartman	Tracy Berna	John Fountain	March 22, 2002	FOP−120	3.14
11	4	"Super Bike"	Butch Hartman	Jack Thomas	Butch Hartman	May 10, 2002	FOP−121	2.84
11	4	"A Mile in My Shoes"	Gary Conrad & Butch Hartman	Tim O'Rourke, Butch Hartman & Steve Marmel	Chris Robertson	May 10, 2002	FOP−123	2.84
12	5	"Timvisible"	Butch Hartman	Butch Hartman & Steve Marmel	Butch Hartman & Paul McEvoy	April 26, 2002	FOP−114	2.66
12	5	"That Old Black Magic"	Sarah Frost & Butch Hartman	Butch Hartman & Steve Marmel	Jim Schumann, Butch Hartman & Sarah Frost	April 26, 2002	FOP−126	2.66
13	6	"Totally Spaced Out"	John Fountain & Butch Hartman	Steve Marmel & Jack Thomas	John Fountain & Paul McEvoy	July 12, 2002	FOP−128	2.12
13	6	"The Switch Glitch"	Gary Conrad & Butch Hartman	Story by : Jenny Nissenson; Teleplay by : Butch Hartman, Steve Marmel & Jenny Nissenson	Jim Schumann, Gary Conrad & Butch Hartman	July 12, 2002	FOP−122	2.12
14	7	"Foul Balled"	John Fountain & Butch Hartman	Butch Hartman & Steve Marmel (Note: In "The Boy Who Would Be Queen", the two are credited in the opposite order.)	Chris Robertson & John Fountain	June 7, 2002	FOP−127	2.69 2.33 (HH)
14	7	"The Boy Who Would Be Queen"	Sarah Frost & Butch Hartman	Butch Hartman & Steve Marmel	Butch Hartman & Sarah Frost	June 7, 2002	FOP−119	2.69 2.33 (HH)
15	8	"Mighty Mom & Dyno Dad"	John Fountain & Butch Hartman	Butch Hartman & Steve Marmel	John Fountain & Chris Robertson	September 6, 2002	FOP−131	3.87 2.41 (HH)
15	8	"Knighty Knight"	Sarah Frost & Butch Hartman	Butch Hartman, Steve Marmel & Jack Thomas	Butch Hartman, Sarah Frost & Heather Martinez	September 6, 2002	FOP−134	3.87 2.41 (HH)
16	9	"Fairy Fairy Quite Contrary"	John Fountain & Butch Hartman	Jack Thomas, Butch Hartman & Steve Marmel	John Fountain & Jim Schumann	September 13, 2002	FOP−132	3.97 2.66 (HH)
16	9	"Nectar of the Odds"	Sarah Frost & Butch Hartman	Jack Thomas	Sarah Frost & Butch Hartman	September 13, 2002	FOP−135	3.97 2.66 (HH)
17	10	"Hail to the Chief"	Gary Conrad & Butch Hartman	Steven Banks, Jack Thomas & Steve Marmel	Gary Conrad & Butch Hartman	September 27, 2002	FOP−130	2.98
17	10	"Twistory"	Gary Conrad & Butch Hartman	Butch Hartman, Steve Marmel & Jack Thomas	Paul McEvoy & Butch Hartman	September 27, 2002	FOP−136	2.98
18	11	"Fool's Day Out"	Gary Conrad & Butch Hartman	Jack Thomas, Butch Hartman & Steve Marmel	Chris Robertson & Gary Conrad	October 11, 2002	FOP−133	2.23 (HH)
18	11	"Deja Vu"	Butch Hartman	Story by : Tracy Berna; Teleplay by : Butch Hartman & Steve Marmel	Butch Hartman	October 11, 2002	FOP−129	2.23 (HH)
19	12	"Information Stupor Highway"	Sarah Frost, John Fountain & Butch Hartman	Butch Hartman & Steve Marmel	Butch Hartman, Jim Schumann, Chris Robertson & John Fountain	January 20, 2003	FOP−137	4.28 2.86 (HH)
19	12	"Information Stupor Highway"	Sarah Frost, John Fountain & Butch Hartman	Butch Hartman & Steve Marmel	Butch Hartman, Jim Schumann, Chris Robertson & John Fountain	January 20, 2003	FOP−138	4.28 2.86 (HH)
20	13	"Scary Godparents"	John Fountain, Gary Conrad & Butch Hartman	Butch Hartman, Steve Marmel & Jack Thomas	Heather Martinez, Chris Robertson, Shawn Murray, Butch Hartman & John Fountain	October 29, 2002	FOP−139	3.29
20	13	"Scary Godparents"	John Fountain, Gary Conrad & Butch Hartman	Butch Hartman, Steve Marmel & Jack Thomas	Heather Martinez, Chris Robertson, Shawn Murray, Butch Hartman & John Fountain	October 29, 2002	FOP−140	3.29

=== Season 3 (2002–03) ===
No. overall	No. in season	Title	Directed by	Written by	Storyboard by	Original release date	Prod. code	Viewers (millions)
21	1	"Ruled Out"	Gary Conrad	Karin Gutman	Dave Thomas	November 8, 2002	FOP−142	3.15
21	1	"That's Life!"	Sarah Frost & Butch Hartman	Spencer Green, Butch Hartman & Steve Marmel	Butch Hartman & Jim Schumann	November 8, 2002	FOP−141	3.15
22	2	"Shiny Teeth"	Butch Hartman	Butch Hartman & Steve Marmel	Heather Martinez & Butch Hartman	November 30, 2002	FOP−155	2.32
22	2	"Odd, Odd West"	John Fountain & Butch Hartman	Steve Marmel & Jack Thomas	Jim Schumann & John Fountain	November 30, 2002	FOP−143	2.32
23	3	"MicroPhony"	Gary Conrad	Butch Hartman, Steve Marmel & Jack Thomas	Dave Thomas	August 1, 2003 (Note: This episode was first released in Canada on March 19, 2003.)	FOP−145	2.86
23	3	"So Totally Spaced Out"	Sarah Frost & Butch Hartman	Steve Marmel & Jack Thomas	Chris Robertson	August 1, 2003	FOP−144	2.86
24	4	"Love Struck!"	Sarah Frost, Gary Conrad & Butch Hartman	Scott Fellows, Steve Marmel & Butch Hartman	Dave Thomas, Chris Robertson, Heather Martinez, Shawn Murray & Butch Hartman	February 14, 2003 (Note: This episode was first released in Canada on February 12, 2003.)	FOP−153	3.99 2.41 (HH)
24	4	"Love Struck!"	Sarah Frost, Gary Conrad & Butch Hartman	Scott Fellows, Steve Marmel & Butch Hartman	Dave Thomas, Chris Robertson, Heather Martinez, Shawn Murray & Butch Hartman	February 14, 2003	FOP−154	3.99 2.41 (HH)
25	5	"Cosmo Con"	Wincat Alcala & Butch Hartman	Scott Fellows & Jack Thomas	Wincat Alcala	January 10, 2003	FOP−156	2.66
25	5	"Wanda's Day Off!"	Sarah Frost & Butch Hartman	Jack Thomas	Heather Martinez & Shawn Murray	January 10, 2003	FOP−158	2.66
26	6	"Odd Jobs"	Gary Conrad	Scott Fellows	Dave Thomas & Chris Robertson	January 27, 2003	FOP−159	3.04
26	6	"Movie Magic"	Wincat Alcala & Butch Hartman	Scott Fellows & Jack Thomas	Ian Graham	January 27, 2003	FOP−146	3.04
27	7	"Abra-Catastrophe!"	Butch Hartman	Butch Hartman & Steve Marmel	John Fountain, Ian Graham, Heather Martinez, Shawn Murray, Chris Robertson, Dave Thomas & Butch Hartman	July 12, 2003	FOP−147 FOP−148	4.49 2.97 (HH)
28	8	"Abra-Catastrophe!"	Butch Hartman	Butch Hartman & Steve Marmel	John Fountain, Ian Graham, Heather Martinez, Shawn Murray, Chris Robertson, Dave Thomas & Butch Hartman	July 12, 2003	FOP−149 FOP−150	4.49 2.97 (HH)
29	9	"Abra-Catastrophe!"	Butch Hartman	Butch Hartman & Steve Marmel	John Fountain, Ian Graham, Heather Martinez, Shawn Murray, Chris Robertson, Dave Thomas & Butch Hartman	July 12, 2003	FOP−151 FOP−152	4.49 2.97 (HH)
30	10	"Sleepover and Over"	Ken Bruce & Butch Hartman	Scott Fellows, Steve Marmel & Jack Thomas	Heather Martinez and Shawn Murray	May 17, 2003	FOP−157	3.00
30	10	"Mother Nature"	Gary Conrad	Scott Fellows & Jack Thomas	Dave Thomas & Chris Robertson	May 17, 2003	FOP−163	3.00
31	11	"The Crimson Chin Meets Mighty Mom & Dyno Dad!" "Mighty Mom & Dyno Dad Meet Crimson Chin"	Ken Bruce & Butch Hartman	Butch Hartman & Steve Marmel	Heather Martinez & Shawn Murray	May 9, 2003	FOP−162	2.72
31	11	"Engine Blocked"	Wincat Alcala & Butch Hartman	Jack Thomas	Ian Graham & Butch Hartman	May 9, 2003	FOP−160	2.72
32	12	"Most Wanted Wish"	Gary Conrad	Scott Fellows	Dave Thomas	May 2, 2003	FOP−164	2.83
32	12	"This is Your Wish"	Sarah Frost	Butch Hartman, Steve Marmel, Scott Fellows & Jack Thomas	Heather Martinez & Shawn Murray	May 2, 2003	FOP−166	2.83
33	13	"Beddy Bye"	Wincat Alcala & Butch Hartman	Story by : Mike Lewis; Teleplay by : Steve Marmel, Jack Thomas & Scott Fellows	Erik Wiese	May 23, 2003	FOP−165	2.89 2.03 (HH)
33	13	"The Grass is Greener"	Ken Bruce & Butch Hartman	Steve Marmel, Jack Thomas & Spencer Green	Ian Graham & Butch Hartman	May 23, 2003	FOP−161	2.89 2.03 (HH)
34	14	"The Secret Origin of Denzel Crocker!"	Gary Conrad, Sarah Frost & Wincat Alcala	Butch Hartman & Steve Marmel	Dave Thomas, Ian Graham, Heather Martinez & Shawn Murray	June 27, 2003	FOP−167	3.08
34	14	"The Secret Origin of Denzel Crocker!"	Gary Conrad, Sarah Frost & Wincat Alcala	Butch Hartman & Steve Marmel	Dave Thomas, Ian Graham, Heather Martinez & Shawn Murray	June 27, 2003	FOP−168	3.08
35	15	"Kung Timmy"	Wincat Alcala & Gary Conrad	Jack Thomas & Scott Fellows	Heather Martinez & Shawn Murray	November 11, 2003 (Note: This episode was first released in Canada on November 4, 2003.)	FOP−170	3.02
35	15	"Which Witch is Which?"	Sarah Frost & Ken Bruce	Butch Hartman & Jack Thomas	Butch Hartman	November 11, 2003	FOP−169	3.02
36	16	"Pipe Down!"	Sarah Frost	Butch Hartman, Steve Marmel, Jack Thomas & Scott Fellows	Dave Thomas	September 26, 2003	FOP−171	2.92
36	16	"The Big Scoop!"	Wincat Alcala & Gary Conrad	Butch Hartman & Steve Marmel	Ian Graham & Lane Lueras	September 26, 2003	FOP−172	2.92
37	17	"Crime Wave"	Wincat Alcala & Butch Hartman	Butch Hartman & Steve Marmel	Heather Martinez & Shawn Murray	October 10, 2003	FOP−176	3.75
37	17	"Odd Ball"	Sarah Frost	Jack Thomas, Scott Fellows & Jim Hecht	Ian Graham	October 10, 2003	FOP−177	3.75
38	18	"Where's Wanda?"	Gary Conrad	Jack Thomas	Heather Martinez & Shawn Murray	October 18, 2003	FOP−179	3.55 2.72 (HH)
38	18	"Imaginary Gary"	Gary Conrad	Steve Marmel & Butch Hartman	Heather Martinez & Shawn Murray	October 18, 2003	FOP−180	3.55 2.72 (HH)
39	19	"Chip Off the Old Chip"	Wincat Alcala & Butch Hartman	Butch Hartman, Steve Marmel & Jack Thomas	Dave Thomas & Butch Hartman	November 21, 2003	FOP−175	3.09
39	19	"Snow Bound"	Sarah Frost	Scott Fellows	Ian Graham & Rayfield Angrum	November 21, 2003	FOP−178	3.09

=== Season 4 (2003–05) ===
No. overall	No. in season	Title	Directed by	Written by	Storyboard by	Original release date	Prod. code	Viewers (millions)
40	1	"Miss Dimmsdale"	Sarah Frost	Scott Fellows	Dave Thomas & Ian Graham	November 7, 2003	FOP−182	N/A
40	1	"Mind Over Magic"	Gary Conrad	Jack Thomas	Heather Martinez & Shawn Murray	November 7, 2003	FOP−187	N/A
41	2	"Shelf Life"	Wincat Alcala & Butch Hartman	Butch Hartman, Steve Marmel & Jack Thomas	Wincat Alcala, Ian Graham & Butch Hartman	September 10, 2004 (Note: This episode was first released in Canada on September 6, 2004.)	FOP−181	N/A
41	2	"Shelf Life"	Wincat Alcala & Butch Hartman	Butch Hartman, Steve Marmel & Jack Thomas	Wincat Alcala, Ian Graham & Butch Hartman	September 10, 2004	FOP−183	N/A
42	3	"Hard Copy"	Sarah Frost	Scott Fellows	Heather Martinez & Shawn Murray	November 14, 2003	FOP−188	N/A
42	3	"Parent Hoods"	Gary Conrad & Ken Bruce	Butch Hartman, Steve Marmel & Jack Thomas	Maureen Mascarina & Dave Thomas	November 14, 2003	FOP−184	N/A
43	4	"Lights...Camera...Adam!"	Sarah Frost & Gary Conrad	Jack Thomas, Scott Fellows, Steve Marmel & Butch Hartman	Mike Manley	June 1, 2004 (Note: This episode was first released in Canada on February 29, 2004.)	FOP−185	N/A
43	4	"A Bad Case of Diary-Uh!"	Sarah Frost & Gary Conrad	Karin Gutman	Heather Martinez & Shawn Murray	June 1, 2004	FOP−189	N/A
44	5	"The Jimmy Timmy Power Hour"	Keith Alcorn & Butch Hartman	Story by : Rico Hall; Teleplay by : Gene Grillo, Butch Hartman & Steve Marmel	Paul Claerhout, Jason Dorf, Rod Douglas & Dan Nosella (3D segments); Ian Graham, Maureen Mascarina, Heather Martinez & Shawn Murray (2D segments)	May 7, 2004	FOP−191	4.96 3.44 (HH)
44	5	"The Jimmy Timmy Power Hour"	Keith Alcorn & Butch Hartman	Story by : Rico Hall; Teleplay by : Gene Grillo, Butch Hartman & Steve Marmel	Paul Claerhout, Jason Dorf, Rod Douglas & Dan Nosella (3D segments); Ian Graham, Maureen Mascarina, Heather Martinez & Shawn Murray (2D segments)	May 7, 2004	FOP−192	4.96 3.44 (HH)
45	6	"Baby Face"	Ken Bruce	Scott Fellows	Maureen Mascarina, Chris Garbutt & Dave Needham	March 19, 2004 (Note: This episode was first released in Australia on March 12, 2004.)	FOP−194	N/A
45	6	"Mr. Right!"	Gary Conrad	Jack Thomas	Ian Graham & Aaron Rozenfeld	March 19, 2004	FOP−190	N/A
46	7	"Vicky Loses Her Icky"	Sarah Frost	Andrew Nicholls & Darrell Vickers	Maureen Mascarina, Aaron Rozenfeld & Wincat Alcala	February 20, 2004	FOP−195	N/A
46	7	"Pixies Inc."	Gary Conrad	Jack Thomas	Shawn Murray & Heather Martinez	February 20, 2004	FOP−193	N/A
47	8	"The Odd Couple"	Gary Conrad	Cynthia True	Heather Martinez & Shawn Murray	June 14, 2004 (Note: This episode was first released in Canada on April 6, 2004.)	FOP−186	N/A
47	8	"Class Clown"	Ken Bruce	Andrew Nicholls & Darrell Vickers	Ian Graham & Tom King	June 14, 2004	FOP−197	N/A
48	9	"The Big Superhero Wish!"	Gary Conrad & Sarah Frost	Butch Hartman & Steve Marmel	Heather Martinez, Shawn Murray, Aaron Rozenfeld & Tom King	February 16, 2004	FOP−199	5.03 3.73 (HH)
48	9	"The Big Superhero Wish!"	Gary Conrad & Sarah Frost	Butch Hartman & Steve Marmel	Heather Martinez, Shawn Murray, Aaron Rozenfeld & Tom King	February 16, 2004	FOP−200	5.03 3.73 (HH)
49	10	"Power Pals"	Sarah Frost	Scott Fellows	Mike Manley	May 18, 2004 (Note: This episode was first released in Canada on April 19, 2004.)	FOP−196	N/A
49	10	"Emotion Commotion!"	Ken Bruce	Jack Thomas	Ian Graham & Maureen Mascarina	May 18, 2004	FOP−198	N/A
50	11	"Fairy Friends & Neighbors!"	Sarah Frost	Story by : Dave Thomas; Teleplay by : Scott Fellows & Jack Thomas	Heather Martinez, Shawn Murray & Dave Thomas	November 27, 2004 (Note: This episode was first released in Canada on April 29, 2004.)	FOP−202	4.25 2.94 (HH)
50	11	"Just the Two of Us!"	Ken Bruce	Jack Thomas, Scott Fellows & Jim Hecht	Maureen Mascarina & Aaron Rozenfeld	November 27, 2004	FOP−201	4.25 2.94 (HH)
51	12	"Who's Your Daddy?"	Gary Conrad	Story by : Bob Boyle & Lewis Foulke; Teleplay by : Andrew Nicholls & Darrell Vickers	Maureen Mascarina & Aaron Rozenfeld	June 18, 2004 (Note: This episode was first released in Canada on May 4, 2004.)	FOP−209	N/A
51	12	"Homewrecker"	Ken Bruce	Cynthia True	Tom King & Shawn Murray	June 18, 2004	FOP−210	N/A
52	13	"A New Squid in Town!"	Ken Bruce	Steve Marmel & Butch Hartman	Tom King & Butch Hartman	November 27, 2004 (Note: This episode was first released in Canada on September 6, 2004.)	FOP−214	4.15 2.89 (HH)
52	13	"Wish Fixers"	Sarah Frost	Scott Fellows	Maureen Mascarina & Aaron Rozenfeld	November 27, 2004	FOP−211	4.15 2.89 (HH)
53	14	"Truth or Cosmoquences"	Gary Conrad	Jack Thomas	Heather Martinez & Shawn Murray	February 15, 2005 (Note: This episode was first released in Canada on September 29, 2004.)	FOP−212	N/A
53	14	"Beach Bummed!"	Sarah Frost	Scott Fellows & Jack Thomas	Dave Thomas, Tom King & Heather Martinez	February 15, 2005	FOP−213	N/A
54	15	"Channel Chasers"	Butch Hartman	Steve Marmel & Butch Hartman	Dave Thomas, Rayfield Angrum, Chris Graham, Butch Hartman, Tom King, Mike Manley, Heather Martinez, Maureen Mascarina, Shawn Murray, Aaron Rozenfeld & Erik Wiese	July 23, 2004	FOP−203 FOP−204	3.71
55	16	"Channel Chasers"	Butch Hartman	Steve Marmel & Butch Hartman	Dave Thomas, Rayfield Angrum, Chris Graham, Butch Hartman, Tom King, Mike Manley, Heather Martinez, Maureen Mascarina, Shawn Murray, Aaron Rozenfeld & Erik Wiese	July 23, 2004	FOP−205 FOP−206	3.71
56	17	"Channel Chasers"	Butch Hartman	Steve Marmel & Butch Hartman	Dave Thomas, Rayfield Angrum, Chris Graham, Butch Hartman, Tom King, Mike Manley, Heather Martinez, Maureen Mascarina, Shawn Murray, Aaron Rozenfeld & Erik Wiese	July 23, 2004	FOP−207 FOP−208	3.71
57	18	"Catman Meets the Crimson Chin"	Ken Bruce	Scott Fellows	Shawn Murray & Tom King	January 17, 2005 (Note: This episode was first released in Australia on August 4, 2004.)	FOP−216	N/A
57	18	"Genie Meanie Minie Mo"	Gary Conrad	Jack Thomas	Maureen Mascarina & Aaron Rozenfeld	January 17, 2005	FOP−215	3.92 3.05 (HH)
58	19	"School's Out!: The Musical"	Butch Hartman	Steve Marmel & Butch Hartman	Dave Thomas, Tom King, Heather Martinez, Maureen Mascarina, Shawn Murray & Aaron Rozenfeld	June 10, 2005	FOP−217 FOP−218	3.99 2.75 (HH)
59	20	"School's Out!: The Musical"	Butch Hartman	Steve Marmel & Butch Hartman	Dave Thomas, Tom King, Heather Martinez, Maureen Mascarina, Shawn Murray & Aaron Rozenfeld	June 10, 2005	FOP−219 FOP−220	3.99 2.75 (HH)

=== Season 5 (2004–06) ===
No. overall	No. in season	Title	Directed by	Written by	Storyboard by	Original release date	Prod. code	Viewers (millions)
60	1	"Nega-Timmy"	Gary Conrad	Story by : Dave Thomas; Teleplay by : Scott Fellows & Jack Thomas	Dave Thomas & Butch Hartman	February 14, 2005 (Note: This episode was first released in Canada on October 13, 2004.)	FOP−221	N/A
60	1	"Love at First Height"	Ken Bruce	Joel Zimmer	Maureen Mascarina	February 14, 2005	FOP−222	N/A
61	2	"You Doo!"	Gary Conrad	Scott Fellows & Jack Thomas	Heather Martinez	February 16, 2005 (Note: This episode was first released in Canada on October 21, 2004.)	FOP−224	N/A
61	2	"Just Desserts!"	Sarah Frost	Scott Fellows	Tom King	February 16, 2005	FOP−223	N/A
62	3	"Go Young, West Man!"	Sarah Frost	Jack Thomas	Aaron Rozenfeld & Butch Hartman	May 9, 2005 (Note: This episode was first released in Canada on November 2, 2004.)	FOP−226	3.17 (Note: Mistakenly listed as May 8, 2005.)
62	3	"Birthday Wish!"	Ken Bruce	Cynthia True	Brandon Kruse & Shawn Murray	May 9, 2005	FOP−225	3.17
63	4	"Blondas Have More Fun!"	Gary Conrad	Scott Fellows	Mike Manley	April 2, 2005 (Note: This episode was first released in Canada on November 10, 2004.)	FOP−227	4.72 3.09 (HH)
63	4	"Five Days of F.L.A.R.G."	Ken Bruce	Scott Fellows	Maureen Mascarina	April 2, 2005	FOP−228	4.72 3.09 (HH)
64	5	"Timmy's 2-D House of Horror"	Gary Conrad	Cynthia True	Heather Martinez	May 10, 2005 (Note: This episode was first released in Canada on November 15, 2004.)	FOP−230	2.87
64	5	"It's a Wishful Life"	Sarah Frost	Jack Thomas	Tom King	May 10, 2005	FOP−229	2.87
65	6	"Escape from Unwish Island"	Ken Bruce	Scott Fellows	Shawn Murray	May 11, 2005 (Note: This episode was first released in Canada on December 3, 2004.)	FOP−231	3.26
65	6	"The Gland Plan" "Fa Giggly Gland"	Sarah Frost	Jack Thomas	Aaron Rozenfeld	May 11, 2005	FOP−232	3.26
66	7	"Back to the Norm"	Gary Conrad	Jack Thomas	Dave Thomas	February 17, 2005 (Note: This episode was first released in Australia on January 14, 2005.)	FOP−234	3.92 3.05 (HH)
66	7	"Teeth for Two"	Ken Bruce	Cynthia True	Maureen Mascarina	February 17, 2005	FOP−233	N/A
67	8	"Hassle in the Castle"	Gary Conrad	Jack Thomas	Heather Martinez	May 12, 2005 (Note: This episode was first released in Canada on March 8, 2005.)	FOP−238	2.92
67	8	"Remy Rides Again"	Sarah Frost	Jack Thomas	Tom King	May 12, 2005	FOP−236	2.92
68	9	"Talkin' Trash"	Sarah Frost	Jack Thomas	Tom King & Maureen Mascarina	May 13, 2005 (Note: This episode was first released in Canada on March 30, 2005.)	FOP−240	2.83
68	9	"Timmy TV"	Ken Bruce	Cynthia True	Shawn Murray	May 13, 2005	FOP−239	2.83
69	10	"The Masked Magician"	Butch Hartman	Scott Fellows	Dave Thomas	February 18, 2005 (Note: This episode was first released in Australia on February 4, 2005.)	FOP−235	N/A
69	10	"The Big Bash"	Ken Bruce & Juli Hashiguchi	Cynthia True	Maureen Mascarina & Shawn Murray	February 18, 2005	FOP−237	N/A
70	11	"Crash Nebula"	Butch Hartman	Butch Hartman & Steve Marmel	Erik Wiese	July 2, 2004	FOP−173	N/A
70	11	"Crash Nebula"	Butch Hartman	Butch Hartman & Steve Marmel	Erik Wiese	July 2, 2004	FOP−174	N/A
71	12	"Mooooving Day"	Gary Conrad	Story by : Jack Thomas; Teleplay by : Gene Grillo	Dave Thomas	October 3, 2005 (Note: This episode was first released in Australia on August 26, 2005.)	FOP−243	N/A
71	12	"Big Wanda"	Ken Bruce	Jack Thomas	Butch Hartman	October 3, 2005	FOP−244	N/A
72	13	"Oh, Brother!"	Gary Conrad	Story by : Kevin Sullivan & Deirdre Brenner; Teleplay by : Kevin Sullivan	Steve Daye	October 4, 2005 (Note: This episode was first released in Australia on September 9, 2005.)	FOP−248	N/A
72	13	"What's the Difference?"	Ken Bruce	Jack Thomas	Maureen Mascarina	October 4, 2005	FOP−245	N/A
73	14	"Smart Attack!"	Ken Bruce	Greg Fideler	Dave Thomas	October 5, 2005 (Note: This episode was first released in Australia on September 16, 2005.)	FOP−246	N/A
73	14	"Operation F.U.N."	Gary Conrad	Cynthia True	Dave Cunningham	October 5, 2005	FOP−247	N/A
74	15	"Something's Fishy!"	Gary Conrad	Steve Marmel & Jack Thomas	Brandon Kruse	October 6, 2005 (Note: This episode was first released in Australia on September 23, 2005.)	FOP−254	N/A
74	15	"Presto Change-O"	Ken Bruce	Story by : Deirdre Brenner & Kevin Sullivan; Teleplay by : Kevin Sullivan	Maureen Mascarina	October 6, 2005	FOP−252	N/A
75	16	"The Good Old Days!"	Gary Conrad	Story by : Dave Thomas & Steve Marmel; Teleplay by : Dave Thomas	Dave Thomas	October 7, 2005	FOP−251	N/A
75	16	"Future Lost"	Ken Bruce	Jack Thomas	Dave Cunningham & Butch Hartman	October 7, 2005	FOP−253	N/A
76	17	"The Jimmy Timmy Power Hour 2: When Nerds Collide!"	Keith Alcorn, Mike Gasaway & Butch Hartman	Story by : Gene Grillo, Steve Marmel, Jed Spingarn & Jack Thomas; Teleplay by : Gene Grillo & Steve Marmel	Jason Dorf, Rod Douglas & Dan Nosella (3D segments); Maureen Mascarina, Steve Daye & Butch Hartman (2D segments)	January 16, 2006	FOP−249	5.48 4.09 (HH)
76	17	"The Jimmy Timmy Power Hour 2: When Nerds Collide!"	Keith Alcorn, Mike Gasaway & Butch Hartman	Story by : Gene Grillo, Steve Marmel, Jed Spingarn & Jack Thomas; Teleplay by : Gene Grillo & Steve Marmel	Jason Dorf, Rod Douglas & Dan Nosella (3D segments); Maureen Mascarina, Steve Daye & Butch Hartman (2D segments)	January 16, 2006	FOP−250	5.48 4.09 (HH)
77	18	"Timmy the Barbarian!"	Ken Bruce	Story by : Dave Thomas; Teleplay by : Jack Thomas & Steve Marmel	Dave Thomas	November 25, 2006 (Note: This episode was first released in Australia on December 9, 2005.)	FOP−257	N/A
77	18	"No Substitute for Crazy!"	Gary Conrad	Kevin Sullivan	Dave Cunningham & Butch Hartman	November 25, 2006	FOP−258	N/A
78	19	"Fairy Idol"	Ken Bruce & Gary Conrad	Story by : Steve Marmel, Dave Thomas & Kevin Sullivan; Teleplay by : Butch Hartman & Steve Marmel	Steve Daye, Maureen Mascarina, Dave Thomas & Butch Hartman	May 19, 2006	FOP−259 FOP−260	5.03 3.53 (HH)
79	20	"Fairy Idol"	Ken Bruce & Gary Conrad	Story by : Steve Marmel, Dave Thomas & Kevin Sullivan; Teleplay by : Butch Hartman & Steve Marmel	Steve Daye, Maureen Mascarina, Dave Thomas & Butch Hartman	May 19, 2006	FOP−261 FOP−262	5.03 3.53 (HH)
80	21	"The Jimmy Timmy Power Hour 3: The Jerkinators!"	Keith Alcorn, Mike Gasaway & Butch Hartman	Steve Marmel & Jed Spingarn	Jason Dorf, Rod Douglas & Dan Nosella (3D segments); Dave Cunningham, Steve Daye, Maureen Mascarina, Dave Thomas & Butch Hartman (2D segments)	July 21, 2006	FOP−255	3.7
80	21	"The Jimmy Timmy Power Hour 3: The Jerkinators!"	Keith Alcorn, Mike Gasaway & Butch Hartman	Steve Marmel & Jed Spingarn	Jason Dorf, Rod Douglas & Dan Nosella (3D segments); Dave Cunningham, Steve Daye, Maureen Mascarina, Dave Thomas & Butch Hartman (2D segments)	July 21, 2006	FOP−256	3.7

=== Season 6 (2008–09) ===
No. overall	No. in season	Title	Directed by	Written by	Storyboard by	Original release date	Prod. code	US viewers (millions)
81	1	"Fairly OddBaby"	Ken Bruce, Michelle Bryan & Gary Conrad	Scott Fellows, Butch Hartman & Kevin Sullivan	Wincat Alcala, Aaron Hammersley, Butch Hartman & Marty Warner	February 18, 2008	FOP−263 FOP−264	8.81
82	2	"Fairly OddBaby"	Ken Bruce, Michelle Bryan & Gary Conrad	Scott Fellows, Butch Hartman & Kevin Sullivan	Wincat Alcala, Aaron Hammersley, Butch Hartman & Marty Warner	February 18, 2008	FOP−265 FOP−266	8.81
83	3	"Mission: Responsible"	Michelle Bryan	Scott Fellows	Butch Hartman	March 10, 2008	FOP−268	3.70
83	3	"Hairicane"	Ken Bruce	Kevin Sullivan	Brandon Kruse	March 11, 2008	FOP−267	N/A
84	4	"Open Wide and Say Aaagh!"	Gary Conrad	Butch Hartman	Wincat Alcala	March 12, 2008	FOP−269	N/A
84	4	"Odd Pirates"	Michelle Bryan	Kevin Sullivan	Butch Hartman & Marty Warner	March 13, 2008	FOP−270	N/A
85	5	"The Fairly Oddlympics"	Ken Bruce & Gary Conrad	Scott Fellows, Butch Hartman & Kevin Sullivan	Aaron Hammersley & Butch Hartman	August 1, 2008	FOP−271	N/A
85	5	"The Fairly Oddlympics"	Ken Bruce & Gary Conrad	Scott Fellows, Butch Hartman & Kevin Sullivan	Aaron Hammersley & Butch Hartman	August 1, 2008	FOP−272	N/A
86	6	"Odd Squad"	Michelle Bryan	Scott Fellows	Brandon Kruse	May 12, 2008	FOP−273	N/A
86	6	"For Emergencies Only"	Ken Bruce	Butch Hartman	Wincat Alcala	May 12, 2008	FOP−274	N/A
87	7	"Cheese & Crockers"	Michelle Bryan	Scott Fellows	Butch Hartman	May 14, 2008	FOP−276	N/A
87	7	"Land Before Timmy"	Gary Conrad	Story by : Tom Krajewski; Teleplay by : Kevin Sullivan	Rayfield Angrum & Butch Hartman	May 15, 2008	FOP−275	N/A
88	8	"Merry Wishmas"	Ken Bruce	Butch Hartman, Scott Fellows & Kevin Sullivan	Aaron Hammersley, Butch Hartman & Brandon Kruse	December 12, 2008 (Note: This episode was first released in A Very Merry Nickmas iTunes on July 10, 2008.)	FOP−277	N/A
88	8	"Merry Wishmas"	Ken Bruce	Butch Hartman, Scott Fellows & Kevin Sullivan	Aaron Hammersley, Butch Hartman & Brandon Kruse	December 12, 2008	FOP−278	N/A
89	9	"King Chang"	Michelle Bryan	Kevin Sullivan	Wincat Alcala	May 16, 2008	FOP−279	N/A
89	9	"The End of the Universe-ity"	Ken Bruce	Scott Fellows	Butch Hartman & Rayfield Angrum	August 11, 2008	FOP−280	N/A
90	10	"Sooper Poof"	Gary Conrad	Laurie Israel & Rachel Ruderman	Aaron Hammersley	August 12, 2008	FOP−281	N/A
90	10	"Wishing Well"	Michelle Bryan	Kevin Sullivan	Butch Hartman	August 13, 2008	FOP−282	N/A
91	11	"Wishy Washy"	Ken Bruce	Butch Hartman	Brandon Kruse	August 14, 2008	FOP−283	N/A
91	11	"Poof's Playdate"	Gary Conrad	Scott Fellows	Butch Hartman	August 14, 2008	FOP−284	N/A
92	12	"Vicky Gets Fired"	Ken Bruce	Kevin Sullivan	Aaron Hammersley	November 30, 2008 (Note: This episode was first released in Canada on November 13, 2008.)	FOP−286	N/A
92	12	"Chindred Spirits"	Michelle Bryan	Amy Keating Rogers	Butch Hartman & Rayfield Angrum	November 30, 2008	FOP−285	N/A
93	13	"9 Lives!"	Ken Bruce	Chris Prouty	Wincat Alcala	November 30, 2008 (Note: This episode was first released in Canada on November 14, 2008.)	FOP−289	N/A
93	13	"Dread 'n' Breakfast"	Gary Conrad	Scott Fellows	Butch Hartman	November 30, 2008	FOP−287	N/A
94	14	"Birthday Bashed!"	Michelle Bryan	Butch Hartman	Brandon Kruse	July 9, 2009 (Note: This episode was first released in Canada on May 18, 2008.)	FOP−288	N/A
94	14	"Momnipresent"	Gary Conrad	Kevin Sullivan	Rayfield Angrum & Butch Hartman	August 12, 2009	FOP−290	N/A
95	15	"Wishology! The Big Beginning"	Butch Hartman; Gary Conrad (uncredited)	Scott Fellows, Butch Hartman & Kevin Sullivan	Wincat Alcala, Aaron Hammersley, Butch Hartman & Brandon Kruse	May 1, 2009	FOP−291 FOP−292	4.01
96	16	"Wishology! The Big Beginning"	Butch Hartman; Gary Conrad (uncredited)	Scott Fellows, Butch Hartman & Kevin Sullivan	Wincat Alcala, Aaron Hammersley, Butch Hartman & Brandon Kruse	May 1, 2009	FOP−293 FOP−294	4.01
97	17	"Wishology! The Exciting Middle Part"	Butch Hartman	Scott Fellows, Butch Hartman & Kevin Sullivan	Wincat Alcala, Aaron Hammersley, Butch Hartman & Brandon Kruse	May 2, 2009	FOP−295 FOP−296	3.68
98	18	"Wishology! The Exciting Middle Part"	Butch Hartman	Scott Fellows, Butch Hartman & Kevin Sullivan	Wincat Alcala, Aaron Hammersley, Butch Hartman & Brandon Kruse	May 2, 2009	FOP−297 FOP−298	3.68
99	19	"Wishology! The Final Ending"	Butch Hartman	Scott Fellows, Butch Hartman & Kevin Sullivan	Aaron Hammersley, Butch Hartman & Brandon Kruse	May 3, 2009	FOP−299 FOP−300	4.07
100	20	"Wishology! The Final Ending"	Butch Hartman	Scott Fellows, Butch Hartman & Kevin Sullivan	Aaron Hammersley, Butch Hartman & Brandon Kruse	May 3, 2009	FOP−301 FOP−302	4.07

=== Season 7 (2009–12) ===
No. overall	No. in season	Title	Directed by	Written by	Storyboard by	Original release date	Prod. code	US viewers (millions)
101	1	"Anti-Poof"	Michelle Bryan & Gary Conrad	Ray DeLaurentis, Butch Hartman, Kevin Sullivan & Ed Valentine	Brandon Kruse & Aaron Hammersley	July 10, 2009	FOP−303	N/A
101	1	"Anti-Poof"	Michelle Bryan & Gary Conrad	Ray DeLaurentis, Butch Hartman, Kevin Sullivan & Ed Valentine	Brandon Kruse & Aaron Hammersley	July 10, 2009	FOP−304	N/A
102	2	"Add-a-Dad"	Michelle Bryan	Story by : Ray DeLaurentis & Butch Hartman; Teleplay by : Kevin Sullivan	Heather Martinez	August 11, 2009	FOP−306	N/A
102	2	"Squirrely Puffs"	Ken Bruce & Butch Hartman	Kevin Sullivan	Fred Gonzales	August 13, 2009	FOP−305	N/A
103	3	"Micecapades"	Gary Conrad	Ray DeLaurentis	Butch Hartman & Vic Harrison	July 8, 2009	FOP−307	N/A
103	3	"Formula for Disaster"	Michelle Bryan	Will Schifrin	Butch Hartman & Dan Haskett	July 7, 2009	FOP−308	N/A
104	4	"Bad Heir Day"	Ken Bruce	Kevin Sullivan	Aaron Hammersley	July 6, 2009	FOP−309	N/A
104	4	"Freaks & Greeks"	Gary Conrad	Tom Krajewski	Fred Gonzales	September 30, 2009	FOP−310	N/A
105	5	"Fly Boy"	Michelle Bryan	Ed Valentine	Brandon Kruse	August 14, 2009	FOP−312	N/A
105	5	"Temporary Fairy"	Ken Bruce	Amy Keating Rogers	Dave Thomas	September 29, 2009	FOP−311	N/A
106	6	"Crocker Shocker"	Gary Conrad	Story by : Amy Keating Rogers; Teleplay by : Kevin Sullivan	Aaron Hammersley	September 28, 2009	FOP−313	N/A
106	6	"Super Zero"	Ken Bruce	Ray DeLaurentis & Will Schifrin	Fred Gonzales	October 1, 2009	FOP−314	N/A
107	7	"Dadbra-Cadabra"	Gary Conrad	Gary Conrad	Dave Thomas	October 2, 2009	FOP−315	N/A
107	7	"Timmy Turnip"	Michelle Bryan	Story by : Ray DeLaurentis & Will Schifrin; Teleplay by : Will Schifrin	Butch Hartman & Cindy Morrow	August 10, 2009	FOP−316	N/A
108	8	"One Man Banned"	Michelle Bryan	Ed Valentine	Aaron Hammersley	October 16, 2009	FOP−319	N/A
108	8	"Frenemy Mine"	Ken Bruce	Kevin Sullivan	Brandon Kruse	October 16, 2009	FOP−317	N/A
109	9	"Chicken Poofs"	Gary Conrad	Ray DeLaurentis & Will Schifrin	Fred Gonzales	April 9, 2010	FOP−318	N/A
109	9	"Stupid Cupid"	Ken Bruce	Will Schifrin	Heather Martinez	February 6, 2010	FOP−320	5.2 (Note: These numbers represent the rating/share that this episode received with children aged 6 through 11.)
110	10	"Double-Oh Schnozmo!"	Gary Conrad	Kevin Sullivan	Brandon Kruse	September 11, 2010	FOP−321	4.0
110	10	"Planet Poof"	Michelle Bryan	Ed Valentine	Dave Thomas	April 5, 2010	FOP−322	N/A
111	11	"The Boss of Me"	Ken Bruce	Charlotte Fullerton	Aaron Hammersley	September 11, 2010	FOP−323	4.0
111	11	"He Poofs He Scores!"	Michelle Bryan	Ray DeLaurentis & Will Schifrin	Fred Gonzales	April 6, 2010	FOP−325	N/A
112	12	"Playdate of Doom"	Gary Conrad	Kevin Sullivan	Heather Martinez	April 7, 2010	FOP−324	N/A
112	12	"Teacher's Pet"	Ken Bruce	Ray DeLaurentis & Will Schifrin	Dave Thomas	April 8, 2010	FOP−326	N/A
113	13	"Manic Mom-Day"	Michelle Bryan	Kevin Sullivan	Brandon Kruse	September 18, 2010	FOP−327	4.7
113	13	"Crocker of Gold"	Gary Conrad	Will Schifrin	Butch Hartman	September 18, 2010	FOP−328	4.7
114	14	"Beach Blanket Bozos"	Michelle Bryan	Ed Valentine	Heather Martinez	August 15, 2011 (Note: This episode was first released on The Fairly Odd Parents: Season 7 DVD on June 10, 2011.)	FOP−330	N/A
114	14	"Poltergeeks"	Ken Bruce	Ed Valentine	Fred Gonzales & Greg Rankin	August 15, 2011	FOP−329	N/A
115	15	"Old Man and the C-"	Gary Conrad	Kevin Sullivan	Dave Thomas	July 14, 2011	FOP−331	N/A
115	15	"Balance of Flour"	Ken Bruce	Ray DeLaurentis & Will Schifrin	Brandon Kruse	July 14, 2011	FOP−332	N/A
116	16	"Food Fight"	Michelle Bryan	Ed Valentine	Aaron Hammersley	July 12, 2011	FOP−333	N/A
116	16	"Please Don't Feed the Turners"	Gary Conrad	Ray DeLaurentis & Will Schifrin	Fred Gonzales	July 12, 2011	FOP−334	N/A
117	17	"Take and Fake"	Ken Bruce	Kevin Sullivan	Heather Martinez	February 6, 2010	FOP−335	5.2
117	17	"Cosmo Rules"	Michelle Bryan	Joanna Lewis	Brandon Kruse	July 11, 2011	FOP−336	5.2
118	18	"Lights Out"	Ken Bruce	Story by : Butch Hartman (uncredited); Teleplay by : Kevin Sullivan	Dave Thomas	July 13, 2011	FOP−338	N/A
118	18	"Dad Overboard"	Gary Conrad	Ray DeLaurentis & Will Schifrin	Aaron Hammersley	July 13, 2011	FOP−337	N/A
119	19	"Farm Pit"	Michelle Bryan	Ed Valentine	Fred Gonzales	August 5, 2012	FOP−339	2.49
119	19	"Crock Talk"	Gary Conrad	Ray DeLaurentis & Will Schifrin	Heather Martinez & Butch Hartman	July 11, 2011	FOP−340	N/A
120	20	"Spellementary School"	Michelle Bryan	Kevin Sullivan	Dave Thomas	February 26, 2011	FOP−341	4.7
120	20	"Operation: Dinkleberg"	Ken Bruce	Ray DeLaurentis & Will Schifrin	Brandon Kruse	February 26, 2011	FOP−342	4.7

=== Season 8 (2011) ===
No. overall	No. in season	Title	Directed by	Written by	Storyboard by	Original release date	Prod. code	Viewers (millions)
121	1	"Love Triangle"	Ken Bruce & Gary Conrad	Dave Thomas, Kevin Sullivan, Will Schifrin, Butch Hartman & Ray DeLaurentis	Dave Thomas & Fred Gonzales	February 12, 2011 (Note: This episode first aired in Latin America on August 26, 2010.)	FOP−343	5.6
121	1	"Love Triangle"	Ken Bruce & Gary Conrad	Dave Thomas, Kevin Sullivan, Will Schifrin, Butch Hartman & Ray DeLaurentis	Dave Thomas & Fred Gonzales	February 12, 2011	FOP−344	5.6
122	2	"Timmy's Secret Wish!"	Dave Thomas	Will Schifrin & Kevin Sullivan	Dave Thomas	November 23, 2011 (Note: This episode first aired in Latin America on November 3, 2011.)	FOP−345 FOP−346	2.91
123	3	"Timmy's Secret Wish!"	Dave Thomas	Will Schifrin & Kevin Sullivan	Dave Thomas	November 23, 2011	FOP−347 FOP−348	2.91
124	4	"Invasion of the Dads"	Ken Bruce & Michelle Bryan	Ray DeLaurentis, Will Schifrin & Kevin Sullivan	Aaron Hammersley & Butch Hartman	June 18, 2011	FOP−351	3.75
124	4	"Invasion of the Dads"	Ken Bruce & Michelle Bryan	Ray DeLaurentis, Will Schifrin & Kevin Sullivan	Aaron Hammersley & Butch Hartman	June 18, 2011	FOP−352	3.75
125	5	"When L.O.S.E.R.S. Attack"	John McIntyre & Ken Bruce	Ray DeLaurentis, Will Schifrin & Kevin Sullivan	Ed Baker & Butch Hartman	October 15, 2011	FOP−349	4.8
125	5	"When L.O.S.E.R.S. Attack"	John McIntyre & Ken Bruce	Ray DeLaurentis, Will Schifrin & Kevin Sullivan	Ed Baker & Butch Hartman	October 15, 2011	FOP−350	4.8
126	6	"Meet the OddParents"	Michelle Bryan & John McIntyre	Ray DeLaurentis, Will Schifrin & Kevin Sullivan	Aaron Hammersley, Butch Hartman & Dave Thomas	December 29, 2011	FOP−353	N/A
126	6	"Meet the OddParents"	Michelle Bryan & John McIntyre	Ray DeLaurentis, Will Schifrin & Kevin Sullivan	Aaron Hammersley, Butch Hartman & Dave Thomas	December 29, 2011	FOP−354	N/A

=== Season 9 (2013–15) ===
No. overall	No. in season	Title	Directed by	Written by	Storyboard by	Original release date	US viewers (millions)
127	1	"Fairly OddPet"	Gary Conrad & Tuck Tucker	Ray DeLaurentis, Will Schifrin & Kevin Sullivan	Miguel Puga & Josh Zinman	March 23, 2013	3.90
128	2	"Dinklescouts"	Gary Conrad	Kevin Arrieta & Sindy Spackman	Marcelo DeSouza	April 14, 2013	2.06
128	2	"I Dream of Cosmo"	Randy Myers & Michelle Bryan	Kevin Arrieta & Sindy Spackman	Mike Nassar & Butch Hartman	April 14, 2013	2.06
129	3	"Turner & Pooch"	Tuck Tucker	Ray DeLaurentis, Will Schifrin & Kevin Sullivan	Butch Hartman & Jim Mortensen	May 4, 2013	3.10
129	3	"Dumbbell Curve"	Randy Myers & Michelle Bryan	Kevin Arrieta, Ray DeLaurentis, Will Schifrin, Sindy Spackman and Kevin Sullivan	Josh Zinman & Butch Hartman	May 11, 2013	3.05
130	4	"The Terrible Twosome"	Gary Conrad	Ray DeLaurentis, Will Schifrin & Kevin Sullivan	Miguel Puga	June 1, 2013	3.19
130	4	"App Trap"	Tuck Tucker & Butch Hartman	Story by : Alec Schwimmer; Teleplay by : Kevin Arrieta & Sindy Spackman	Mike Nassar & Butch Hartman	June 8, 2013	2.73
131	5	"Force of Nature"	Michelle Bryan & Randy Myers	Kevin Arrieta & Sindy Spackman	Marcelo DeSouza	June 15, 2013	3.03
131	5	"Viral Vidiots"	Gary Conrad	Ellen Byron & Lissa Kapstrom	Jim Mortensen & Butch Hartman	June 22, 2013	3.22
132	6	"Scary GodCouple"	Michelle Bryan, Butch Hartman, Randy Myers & Tuck Tucker	Ray DeLaurentis, Will Schifrin & Kevin Sullivan	Miguel Puga, Josh Zinman & Butch Hartman	October 19, 2013	2.96
133	7	"Two and a Half Babies"	Gary Conrad	Sindy Spackman	Mike Milo & Butch Hartman	July 25, 2014 (Note: This episode first aired on November 18, 2013 in Germany and Austria.)	1.57
133	7	"Anchor's Away"	Gary Conrad	Kevin Arrieta & Sindy Spackman	Mike Nassar & Butch Hartman	July 25, 2014	1.57
134	8	"Finding Emo"	Michelle Bryan & Randy Myers	Ray DeLaurentis, Will Schifrin & Kevin Sullivan	Jim Mortensen & Butch Hartman	July 9, 2014	1.57
134	8	"Dust Busters"	Michelle Bryan, Kevin Petrilak & Tuck Tucker	Jonathan Butler, Ray DeLaurentis, Will Schifrin & Kevin Sullivan	Marcelo DeSouza	July 9, 2014	1.57
135	9	"The Bored Identity"	Michelle Bryan, Kevin Petrilak & Tuck Tucker	Ray DeLaurentis, Will Schifrin & Kevin Sullivan	Miguel Puga	July 23, 2014	1.80
135	9	"Country Clubbed"	Michelle Bryan	Kevin Arrieta, Alec Schwimmer & Sindy Spackman	Mike Nassar & Butch Hartman	July 23, 2014	1.80
136	10	"Dog Gone"	Gary Conrad	Story by : Alec Schwimmer; Teleplay by : Kevin Arrieta, Ray DeLaurentis, Will Schifrin, Sindy Spackman & Kevin Sullivan	Marcelo DeSouza	July 28, 2014	1.80
136	10	"Turner Back Time"	Michelle Bryan, Kevin Petrilak & Tuck Tucker	Ellen Byron & Lissa Kapstrom	Jim Mortensen & Butch Hartman	July 28, 2014	1.80
137	11	"Cosmonopoly"	Michelle Bryan	Ray DeLaurentis, Will Schifrin, Kevin Sullivan & Becky Wangberg	Mike Milo & Butch Hartman	July 7, 2014	1.60
137	11	"Hero Hound"	Gary Conrad	Kevin Arrieta	Miguel Puga	July 7, 2014	1.60
138	12	"A Boy and His Dog-Boy"	Michelle Bryan	Sindy Spackman	Marcelo DeSouza	July 8, 2014	1.72
138	12	"Crock Blocked"	Michelle Bryan, Kevin Petrilak & Tuck Tucker	Sindy Spackman	Mike Nassar & Butch Hartman	July 8, 2014	1.72
139	13	"Weirdos on a Train"	Gary Conrad	Ray DeLaurentis, Will Schifrin & Kevin Sullivan	Jim Mortensen & Butch Hartman	July 29, 2014	1.74
139	13	"Tons of Timmys"	Michelle Bryan, Kevin Petrilak, and Tuck Tucker	Ray DeLaurentis, Will Schifrin & Kevin Sullivan	Mike Milo & Butch Hartman	July 29, 2014	1.74
140	14	"Let Sleeper Dogs Lie"	Michelle Bryan	Sindy Spackman	Miguel Puga	July 14, 2014	1.86
140	14	"Cat-Astrophe"	Gary Conrad	Alec Schwimmer	Mike Nassar & Butch Hartman	July 14, 2014	1.86
141	15	"Lame Ducks"	Michelle Bryan	Sindy Spackman	Jim Mortensen & Butch Hartman	July 30, 2014	2.21
141	15	"A Perfect Nightmare"	Kevin Petrilak	Ray DeLaurentis, Will Schifrin & Kevin Sullivan	Marcelo DeSouza	July 30, 2014	2.21
142	16	"Love at First Bark"	Gary Conrad	Ray DeLaurentis, Will Schifrin & Kevin Sullivan	Mike Milo & Butch Hartman	July 21, 2014	1.54
142	16	"Desperate Without Housewives"	Kevin Petrilak	Lissa Kapstrom	Miguel Puga	July 21, 2014	1.54
143	17	"Jerk of All Trades"	Michelle Bryan	Sindy Spackman	Mike Nassar & Butch Hartman	July 15, 2014	1.85
143	17	"Snack Attack"	Gary Conrad	Story by : Alec Schwimmer; Teleplay by : Ray DeLaurentis, Will Schifrin & Kevin Sullivan	Marcelo DeSouza	July 15, 2014	1.85
144	18	"Turning Into Turner"	Kevin Petrilak	Joanna Lewis, Alec Schwimmer & Kristine Songco	Jim Mortensen & Butch Hartman	July 16, 2014	1.91
144	18	"The Wand That Got Away"	Michelle Bryan	Sindy Spackman	Mike Milo & Butch Hartman	July 16, 2014	1.91
145	19	"Stage Fright"	Gary Conrad	Joanna Lewis, Kristine Songco & Becky Wangberg	Miguel Puga	July 22, 2014	1.56
145	19	"Gone Flushin'"	Kevin Petrilak	Lissa Kapstrom	Mike Nassar & Butch Hartman	July 22, 2014	1.56
146	20	"Fairly Old Parent"	Michelle Bryan & Gary Conrad	Ray DeLaurentis, Will Schifrin, Alec Schwimmer, Kevin Sullivan & Becky Wangberg	Marcelo DeSouza, Jim Mortensen & Butch Hartman	March 28, 2015 (Note: This episode first aired on November 20, 2014 in Germany and Austria.)	1.95
147	21	"School of Crock"	Ken Bruce & Michelle Bryan	Ray DeLaurentis, Will Schifrin, Alec Schwimmer & Kevin Sullivan	Wolf-Rüdiger Bloss & Fred Gonzales	May 26, 2014	2.45
148	22	"Dimmsdale Tales"	Ken Bruce & Gary Conrad	Joanna Lewis, Alec Schwimmer, Kristine Songco & Sindy Spackman	Brandon Kruse & Miguel Puga	July 18, 2014	1.75
149	23	"The Past and the Furious"	Michelle Bryan and Gary Conrad	Ray DeLaurentis, Will Schifrin, Alec Schwimmer & Kevin Sullivan	Wolf-Rüdiger Bloss, Marcelo DeSouza & Brandon Kruse	July 11, 2014	2.12
150	24	"The Fairy Beginning"	Ken Bruce and Michelle Bryan	Ray DeLaurentis, Will Schifrin, Alec Schwimmer & Kevin Sullivan	Fred Gonzales, Brandon Kruse & Miguel Puga	March 28, 2015 (Note: This episode first aired on November 26, 2014 in Germany and Austria.)	2.03
151	25	"Fairly Odd Fairy Tales"	Ken Bruce & Gary Conrad	Whitney Fox, Joanna Lewis, Alec Schwimmer & Kristine Songco	Marcelo DeSouza & Brandon Kruse	August 1, 2014	2.14
152	26	"Man's Worst Friend"	Michelle Bryan & Gary Conrad	Ray DeLaurentis, Will Schifrin, Alec Schwimmer & Kevin Sullivan	Wolf-Rüdiger Bloss & Fred Gonzales	February 8, 2015 (Note: This episode first aired on November 28, 2014 in Germany and Austria.)	1.48

=== Season 10 (2016–17) ===
No. overall	No. in season	Title	Directed by	Written by	Storyboard by	Original release date	Prod. code	US viewers (millions)
Nickelodeon
153	1	"The Big Fairy Share Scare!"	Ken Bruce & John McIntyre	Ellen Byron, Ray DeLaurentis & Lissa Kapstrom	Fred Gonzales & Butch Hartman	January 15, 2016	FOP-407	1.20
153	1	"The Big Fairy Share Scare!"	Ken Bruce & John McIntyre	Ellen Byron, Ray DeLaurentis & Lissa Kapstrom	Fred Gonzales & Butch Hartman	January 15, 2016	FOP-408	1.20
154	2	"Whittle Me This!"	John McIntyre	Ellen Byron, Bob Colleary, Ray DeLaurentis & Lissa Kapstrom	Sarah Johnson	January 22, 2016	FOP-410	1.23
154	2	"Mayor May Not"	Ken Bruce	Ellen Byron, Bob Colleary, Ray DeLaurentis & Lissa Kapstrom	Butch Hartman & Paul Lee	January 29, 2016	FOP-411	1.13
155	3	"Girly Squirrely"	Sherie Pollack	Ellen Byron, Bob Colleary, Ray DeLaurentis & Lissa Kapstrom	John West	February 5, 2016	FOP-412	1.30
155	3	"Birthday Battle"	Sherie Pollack	Ellen Byron, Bob Colleary, Ray DeLaurentis & Lissa Kapstrom	Gavin Freitas	February 19, 2016	FOP-409	1.22
156	4	"The Fair Bears"	John McIntyre	Ellen Byron, Bob Colleary, Ray DeLaurentis & Lissa Kapstrom	Benji Williams	February 26, 2016	FOP-413	1.27
156	4	"Return of the L.O.S.E.R.S."	Ken Bruce	Ellen Byron, Bob Colleary, Ray DeLaurentis & Lissa Kapstrom	Gavin Freitas	June 14, 2017 (Nicktoons) (Note: This episode first aired on May 5, 2016 in Latin America.)	FOP-414	0.17
157	5	"A Sash and a Rash"	Sherie Pollack	Ellen Byron, Bob Colleary, Ray DeLaurentis & Lissa Kapstrom	Sarah Johnson	September 12, 2016 (Note: This episode first aired on May 6, 2016 in Latin America.)	FOP-415	1.46
157	5	"Fish Out of Water"	John McIntyre	Ellen Byron, Bob Colleary, Ray DeLaurentis & Lissa Kapstrom	Butch Hartman & Paul Lee	September 12, 2016	FOP-416	N/A
158	6	"Animal Crockers"	Ken Bruce	Ellen Byron, Bob Colleary, Ray DeLaurentis & Lissa Kapstrom	Sarah Johnson	September 14, 2016 (Note: This episode first aired on August 17, 2016 in Israel.)	FOP-420	1.36
158	6	"One Flu Over the Crocker's Nest"	Ken Bruce	Ellen Byron, Bob Colleary, Ray DeLaurentis & Lissa Kapstrom	John West	September 14, 2016	FOP-417	1.36
159	7	"Booby Trapped"	John McIntyre & Sherie Pollack	Ellen Byron, Bob Colleary, Ray DeLaurentis & Lissa Kapstrom	Gavin Freitas, Sarah Johnson & Benji Williams	September 16, 2016 (Note: This episode first aired on August 18, 2016 in Israel.)	FOP-418	1.60
159	7	"Booby Trapped"	John McIntyre & Sherie Pollack	Ellen Byron, Bob Colleary, Ray DeLaurentis & Lissa Kapstrom	Gavin Freitas, Sarah Johnson & Benji Williams	September 16, 2016	FOP-419	1.60
160	8	"Blue Angel"	John McIntyre	Bob Colleary & Ray DeLaurentis	John West	September 13, 2016 (Note: This episode first aired on August 21, 2016 in Israel.)	FOP-422	1.39
160	8	"Marked Man"	Sherie Pollack	Ellen Byron, Bob Colleary, Ray DeLaurentis, Lissa Kapstrom & Becky Wangberg	Butch Hartman & Paul Lee	September 13, 2016	FOP-421	1.39
161	9	"Clark Laser"	Ken Bruce	Ray DeLaurentis	Benji Williams	September 15, 2016 (Note: This episode first aired on August 22, 2016 in Israel.)	FOP-423	1.55
161	9	"Married to the Mom"	Sherie Pollack	Ellen Byron & Lissa Kapstrom	Gavin Freitas	September 15, 2016	FOP-424	1.55
Nicktoons
162	10	"Which Is Wish"	John McIntyre	Ellen Byron, Bob Colleary, Ray DeLaurentis & Lissa Kapstrom	Sarah Johnson	June 21, 2017 (Note: This episode first aired on August 23, 2016 in Israel.); April 2, 2018 (Nickelodeon)	FOP-425	0.22
162	10	"Nuts and Dangerous"	Ken Bruce	Bob Colleary, Ray DeLaurentis & Lissa Kapstrom	Butch Hartman and Paul Lee	February 22, 2017; April 2, 2018 (Nickelodeon)	FOP-426	N/A
163	11	"Fairy Con"	John McIntyre	Ellen Byron, Bob Colleary & Ray DeLaurentis	Benji Williams	June 28, 2017 (Note: This episode first aired on November 3, 2016 in Germany.); April 2, 2018 (Nickelodeon)	FOP-428	0.23
163	11	"The Hungry Games"	Sherie Pollack	Becky Wangberg	John West	July 12, 2017 (Note: This episode first aired on November 3, 2016 in Austria.); April 2, 2018 (Nickelodeon)	FOP-427	0.26
164	12	"Spring Break-Up"	Ken Bruce	Ellen Byron, Bob Colleary, Ray DeLaurentis & Lissa Kapstrom	Gavin Freitas	February 1, 2017 (Note: This episode first aired on November 7, 2016 in Germany.); April 3, 2018 (Nickelodeon)	FOP-429	0.21
164	12	"Dimmsdale Daze"	Sherie Pollack	Ellen Byron, Bob Colleary, Ray DeLaurentis & Lissa Kapstrom	Sarah Johnson	June 21, 2017 (Note: This episode first aired on November 8, 2016 in Germany.); April 3, 2018 (Nickelodeon)	FOP-430	0.22
165	13	"Cat 'n Mouse"	Ken Bruce	Ellen Byron, Bob Colleary, Ray DeLaurentis & Lissa Kapstrom	Sarah Johnson & Paul Lee	February 22, 2017 (Note: This episode first aired on November 9, 2016 in Germany.); April 3, 2018 (Nickelodeon)	FOP-431	N/A
165	13	"Chip Off the Old Crock!"	Sherie Pollack	Ellen Byron, Bob Colleary, Ray DeLaurentis & Lissa Kapstrom	John West	June 28, 2017 (Note: This episode first aired on November 10, 2016 in Germany.); April 3, 2018 (Nickelodeon)	FOP-432	0.23
166	14	"Space Ca-Dad"	George Elliott & Keith Oliver	Ellen Byron, Bob Colleary, Ray DeLaurentis & Lissa Kapstrom	Steve Daye	July 19, 2017 (Note: This episode first aired on December 10, 2016 in Austria.); April 4, 2018 (Nickelodeon)	FOP-433	0.28
166	14	"Summer Bummer"	George Elliott & Keith Oliver	Ellen Byron, Bob Colleary, Ray DeLaurentis & Lissa Kapstrom	Ted Collyer	July 12, 2017 (Note: This episode first aired on December 10, 2016 in Austria.); April 4, 2018 (Nickelodeon)	FOP-434	0.26
167	15	"Hare Raiser"	George Elliott & Keith Oliver	Ellen Byron, Bob Colleary, Ray DeLaurentis & Lissa Kapstrom	Blayne Burnside & Brian Coughlan	July 26, 2017 (Note: This episode first aired on December 10, 2016 in Austria.); April 4, 2018 (Nickelodeon)	FOP-435	0.38
167	15	"The Kale Patch Caper"	George Elliott & Keith Oliver	Ellen Byron, Bob Colleary, Ray DeLaurentis, Lissa Kapstrom & Becky Wangberg	Steve Daye	July 26, 2017; April 4, 2018 (Nickelodeon)	FOP-437	0.38
168	16	"Dadlantis"	George Elliott & Keith Oliver	Ellen Byron, Bob Colleary, Ray DeLaurentis & Lissa Kapstrom	Blayne Burnside, Brian Wong & Gerry Duchemin	February 8, 2017 (Note: This episode first aired on December 10, 2016 in Austria.); April 5, 2018 (Nickelodeon)	FOP-436	N/A
168	16	"Chloe Rules!"	George Elliott & Keith Oliver	Ellen Byron, Bob Colleary, Ray DeLaurentis & Lissa Kapstrom	Steve Remen	February 15, 2017 (Note: This episode first aired on December 10, 2016 in Austria.); April 5, 2018 (Nickelodeon)	FOP-438	0.14
169	17	"Crockin' the House" "Crockin' the Town"	George Elliott & Keith Oliver	Ellen Byron, Bob Colleary, Ray DeLaurentis & Lissa Kapstrom	Ted Collyer	January 25, 2017 (Note: This episode first aired on December 26, 2016 in Germany.); April 5, 2018 (Nickelodeon)	FOP-439	0.17
169	17	"Tardy Sauce"	George Elliott & Keith Oliver	Ellen Byron, Bob Colleary, Ray DeLaurentis & Lissa Kapstrom	Brian Coughlan	February 15, 2017 (Note: This episode first aired on December 27, 2016 in Germany.); April 5, 2018 (Nickelodeon)	FOP-440	0.14
170	18	"Knitwits"	George Elliott & Keith Oliver	Ellen Byron, Bob Colleary, Ray DeLaurentis & Lissa Kapstrom	Gerry Duchemin	February 8, 2017; April 6, 2018 (Nickelodeon)	FOP-441	N/A
170	18	"Dimmsdale's Got Talent?"	George Elliott & Keith Oliver	Ellen Byron, Bob Colleary, Ray DeLaurentis, Lissa Kapstrom & Becky Wangberg	Steve Daye & Seema Virdi	June 17, 2017; April 6, 2018 (Nickelodeon)	FOP-442	N/A
171	19	"Certifiable Super Sitter"	George Elliott & Keith Oliver	Story by : Kiley Vorndran; Teleplay by : Ellen Byron, Bob Colleary, Ray DeLaurentis & Lissa Kapstrom	Simon Paquette & Ted Collyer	January 18, 2017; April 6, 2018 (Nickelodeon)	FOP-443	0.23
171	19	"Certifiable Super Sitter"	George Elliott & Keith Oliver	Story by : Kiley Vorndran; Teleplay by : Ellen Byron, Bob Colleary, Ray DeLaurentis & Lissa Kapstrom	Simon Paquette & Ted Collyer	January 18, 2017; April 6, 2018 (Nickelodeon)	FOP-444	0.23
172	20	"Goldie-Crocks and the Three Fair Bears"	George Elliott & Keith Oliver	Ray DeLaurentis & Will Schifrin	Katie Shanahan	July 19, 2017 (Note: This episode first aired on February 21, 2017 in Germany.)	FOP-446	0.28
172	20	"Fancy Schmancy"	George Elliott & Keith Oliver	Becky Wangberg	Brian Coughlan	February 1, 2017	FOP-445	0.21

== Live-action television films ==
Title	Directed by	Written by	Original release date	U.S. viewers (millions)
A Fairly Odd Movie: Grow Up, Timmy Turner!	Savage Steve Holland	Butch Hartman & Scott Fellows	July 9, 2011	5.82
A Fairly Odd Christmas	Savage Steve Holland	Story by : Butch Hartman, Ray DeLaurentis & Will Schifrin; Teleplay by : Butch Hartman & Savage Steve Holland	November 29, 2012	4.47
A Fairly Odd Summer	Savage Steve Holland	Story by : Butch Hartman, Ray DeLaurentis & Kevin Sullivan; Teleplay by : Butch Hartman & Savage Steve Holland	August 2, 2014	2.80

== Notes ==
Early international premieres
