= Talkin' Trash =

Talkin' Trash may refer to:

- List of The Fairly OddParents episodes
- Godzilla: The Series
- "Talkin' Trash", song by Betty Davis 1976
- "Talkin' Trash", song by The Marathons 1961
