= The Fairly OddParents season 9 =

The Fairly OddParents
- Season 9
- DVD cover
- Showrunner: Butch Hartman
- No. of episodes: 26 (43 segments)

Release
- Original network: Nickelodeon
- Original release: March 23, 2013 – March 28, 2015

Season chronology
- ← Previous; Season 8 Next → Season 10

The ninth and penultimate season of The Fairly OddParents premiered on March 23, 2013 with the episode "Fairly OddPet" which aired after the 2013 Nickelodeon Kids' Choice Awards. Nickelodeon renewed the show for a ninth season on March 14, 2012, during its upfront. The season ended on March 28, 2015 with the episode "The Fairy Beginning".

== Production ==
Promotional poster

The season was produced from 2012 to 2014. Recording for the ninth season took place from June 2012 to March 2013. This is the season with the most episodes, featuring episodes 127-152. It is the second season to air after a year-long hiatus, after the 2006 cancellation. It is also the first season produced fully for high definition and widescreen presentation, making it one of the last Nickelodeon shows to switch to that format along with the network's longest-running show, SpongeBob SquarePants.

In this season, Timmy Turner gets a fairy dog named Sparky.

== Episodes ==
No. overall	No. in season	Title	Directed by	Written by	Storyboard by	Original release date	US viewers (millions)
127	1	"Fairly OddPet"	Gary Conrad & Tuck Tucker	Ray DeLaurentis, Will Schifrin & Kevin Sullivan	Miguel Puga & Josh Zinman	March 23, 2013	3.90
Timmy adopts a mischievous and magical fairy dog named Sparky. However, owning a fairy dog proves to be a much bigger challenge than Timmy could have ever predicted.
128	2	"Dinklescouts"	Gary Conrad	Kevin Arrieta & Sindy Spackman	Marcelo DeSouza	April 14, 2013	2.06
128	2	"I Dream of Cosmo"	Randy Myers & Michelle Bryan	Kevin Arrieta & Sindy Spackman	Mike Nassar & Butch Hartman	April 14, 2013	2.06
Timmy doesn't want his dad to be scout leader anymore, and wishes for Dinkleberg to be scout leader. Cosmo loses his memory and mistakenly thinks his job is to grant wishes for Timmy's father. They instantly cause chaos and Timmy, Wanda, Poof and Sparky must stop it.
129	3	"Turner & Pooch"	Tuck Tucker	Ray DeLaurentis, Will Schifrin & Kevin Sullivan	Butch Hartman & Jim Mortensen	May 4, 2013	3.10
129	3	"Dumbbell Curve"	Randy Myers & Michelle Bryan	Kevin Arrieta, Ray DeLaurentis, Will Schifrin, Sindy Spackman and Kevin Sullivan	Josh Zinman & Butch Hartman	May 11, 2013	3.05
Mr. Crocker tries to find the new source of magic in the Turner house. Crocker grades on a bell curve so Timmy wishes everyone was dumber than him. A meteor threatens Earth and with everyone mistaking it for a giant muffin. So, Timmy is the only one smart enough to stop it.
130	4	"The Terrible Twosome"	Gary Conrad	Ray DeLaurentis, Will Schifrin & Kevin Sullivan	Miguel Puga	June 1, 2013	3.19
130	4	"App Trap"	Tuck Tucker & Butch Hartman	Story by : Alec Schwimmer; Teleplay by : Kevin Arrieta & Sindy Spackman	Mike Nassar & Butch Hartman	June 8, 2013	2.73
Poof goes through the terrible twos, however, Foop goes through the terrific twos so Timmy and his fairies have to survive Poof's terrible twos. Timmy gets a smartphone with top-of-the-line features, but the phone begins to become intrusive in his life.
131	5	"Force of Nature"	Michelle Bryan & Randy Myers	Kevin Arrieta & Sindy Spackman	Marcelo DeSouza	June 15, 2013	3.03
131	5	"Viral Vidiots"	Gary Conrad	Ellen Byron & Lissa Kapstrom	Jim Mortensen & Butch Hartman	June 22, 2013	3.22
Timmy helps clean up a park and angers the animals when he wishes they would keep things tidy on their own. Crocker kidnaps Timmy's mom because he thinks she's a troll who possesses magic.
132	6	"Scary GodCouple"	Michelle Bryan, Butch Hartman, Randy Myers & Tuck Tucker	Ray DeLaurentis, Will Schifrin & Kevin Sullivan	Miguel Puga, Josh Zinman & Butch Hartman	October 19, 2013	2.96
Foop becomes Vicky's anti-fairy godparent. Vicky and Foop terrorize Timmy and the kids of Dimmsdale. Foop tells Vicky that the reason Timmy has thwarted her all these years is because he has fairy godparents. If they can destroy the fairies, no one will be able to stop them.
133	7	"Two and a Half Babies"	Gary Conrad	Sindy Spackman	Mike Milo & Butch Hartman	July 25, 2014 (Note: This episode first aired on November 18, 2013 in Germany and Austria.)	1.57
133	7	"Anchor's Away"	Gary Conrad	Kevin Arrieta & Sindy Spackman	Mike Nassar & Butch Hartman	July 25, 2014	1.57
Foop and Poof must take care of an egg for a school project. However, Foop breaks it and swaps it with a dangerous one. Due to several of Timmy's wishes causing effects on the news reports, Chet Ubetcha quits his job. Timmy's dad becomes the new(s) reporter and chaos ensues.
134	8	"Finding Emo"	Michelle Bryan & Randy Myers	Ray DeLaurentis, Will Schifrin & Kevin Sullivan	Jim Mortensen & Butch Hartman	July 9, 2014	1.57
134	8	"Dust Busters"	Michelle Bryan, Kevin Petrilak & Tuck Tucker	Jonathan Butler, Ray DeLaurentis, Will Schifrin & Kevin Sullivan	Marcelo DeSouza	July 9, 2014	1.57
Timmy falls in love with a girl named Missy and wishes to become emo to impress her. However, he stops caring about everything and his fairies become at risk. Guest star: Dannah Phirman as Missy Timmy's house gets filled with fairy "dust" from wishing, so Timmy and his fairies try to clean it up. Meanwhile, Mr. and Mrs. Turner are taken to a fake spa by a disguised Jorgen.
135	9	"The Bored Identity"	Michelle Bryan, Kevin Petrilak & Tuck Tucker	Ray DeLaurentis, Will Schifrin & Kevin Sullivan	Miguel Puga	July 23, 2014	1.80
135	9	"Country Clubbed"	Michelle Bryan	Kevin Arrieta, Alec Schwimmer & Sindy Spackman	Mike Nassar & Butch Hartman	July 23, 2014	1.80
Dad is upset because everyone thinks he's boring. Timmy wishes that his dad's life would be as exciting as Jason Bored's, an international secret agent. After being kicked out of the Buxaplenty's "Fancy Shmancy Country Club" thanks to Cosmo, Timmy wishes to look like a rich kid in order to get back inside. Meanwhile, Wanda and Sparky's brains are switched.
136	10	"Dog Gone"	Gary Conrad	Story by : Alec Schwimmer; Teleplay by : Kevin Arrieta, Ray DeLaurentis, Will Schifrin, Sindy Spackman & Kevin Sullivan	Marcelo DeSouza	July 28, 2014	1.80
136	10	"Turner Back Time"	Michelle Bryan, Kevin Petrilak & Tuck Tucker	Ellen Byron & Lissa Kapstrom	Jim Mortensen & Butch Hartman	July 28, 2014	1.80
Timmy's dad refuses to sell Sparky to his boss, and he makes his life miserable at work in response. Timmy and Sparky attempt to make up a plan in order to solve the issue. When Timmy discovers that his ancestor could have been rich if he made the right decision, Timmy wishes that his ancestor did make the right decision. While the Turner family basks in their riches, the whole town is a dump and Timmy's fairies get taken away (except for Sparky) because he's no longer miserable.
137	11	"Cosmonopoly"	Michelle Bryan	Ray DeLaurentis, Will Schifrin, Kevin Sullivan & Becky Wangberg	Mike Milo & Butch Hartman	July 7, 2014	1.60
137	11	"Hero Hound"	Gary Conrad	Kevin Arrieta	Miguel Puga	July 7, 2014	1.60
Timmy, his dad and the fairies get trapped in a board game created by Cosmo and must find a way to get out before Timmy's mom throws the game in a woodchipper. Timmy wishes Sparky would get a chance to be heroic, while Dad thinks he can talk to animals.
138	12	"A Boy and His Dog-Boy"	Michelle Bryan	Sindy Spackman	Marcelo DeSouza	July 8, 2014	1.72
138	12	"Crock Blocked"	Michelle Bryan, Kevin Petrilak & Tuck Tucker	Sindy Spackman	Mike Nassar & Butch Hartman	July 8, 2014	1.72
Timmy wishes that Sparky was a human so that they could do activities together, but Jorgen informs him that he has violated the "Dog-Human Continuum" and he turns Timmy into a dog to restore balance. Timmy has to convince Sparky to change back to canine form within 1 hour, or else he will be stuck as a dog forever. Timmy wishes Mr. Crocker would disappear, but he becomes invisible. Due to this, Dad thinks the house is haunted.
139	13	"Weirdos on a Train"	Gary Conrad	Ray DeLaurentis, Will Schifrin & Kevin Sullivan	Jim Mortensen & Butch Hartman	July 29, 2014	1.74
139	13	"Tons of Timmys"	Michelle Bryan, Kevin Petrilak, and Tuck Tucker	Ray DeLaurentis, Will Schifrin & Kevin Sullivan	Mike Milo & Butch Hartman	July 29, 2014	1.74
Mr. Crocker agrees to get rid of Dinkleberg for Timmy's dad if he captures Timmy's fish (his fairies) for him. The Dads from the episodes "Add-a-Dad" and "Invasion of the Dads" return to take Timmy to their workplaces. When that proves to be too much for Timmy, he wishes for a clone of himself for each Dad. But when the Timmys want Timmy's fairies (apparently thanks to Cosmo), Timmy must save them.
140	14	"Let Sleeper Dogs Lie"	Michelle Bryan	Sindy Spackman	Miguel Puga	July 14, 2014	1.86
140	14	"Cat-Astrophe"	Gary Conrad	Alec Schwimmer	Mike Nassar & Butch Hartman	July 14, 2014	1.86
Crocker learns that Sparky was once his dog when he was a child, and can regain control of him using a secret trigger word. Catman mistakenly thinks Sparky is his old nemesis, Dogman, and tries to get rid of him. To prevent this, Timmy brings the real Dogman in an attempt to convince Catman that Sparky isn't him.
141	15	"Lame Ducks"	Michelle Bryan	Sindy Spackman	Jim Mortensen & Butch Hartman	July 30, 2014	2.21
141	15	"A Perfect Nightmare"	Kevin Petrilak	Ray DeLaurentis, Will Schifrin & Kevin Sullivan	Marcelo DeSouza	July 30, 2014	2.21
Timmy, Timmy's Dad, and Crocker become detectives and investigate a string of robberies all over Dimmsdale following a robbing of the Turners' house. Their actions, however, end up doing more harm than good. Timmy wishes for the perfect family to win a contest, but it turns into a nightmare for being perfect all the time.
142	16	"Love at First Bark"	Gary Conrad	Ray DeLaurentis, Will Schifrin & Kevin Sullivan	Mike Milo & Butch Hartman	July 21, 2014	1.54
142	16	"Desperate Without Housewives"	Kevin Petrilak	Lissa Kapstrom	Miguel Puga	July 21, 2014	1.54
Sparky falls in love with Dinkleberg's dog, but Timmy's dad forbids him from seeing her. Timmy, his dad, Cosmo and Mr. Crocker get tired of their respective mothers'/wives' nagging, so Mr. Turner wishes the universe was without women for 24 hours. However, this turns out to have consequences, as they are unable to survive properly without the women. Worse yet, a group of alligator-like aliens called the Snobulacs arrive to Earth and blame them for their females disappearing.
143	17	"Jerk of All Trades"	Michelle Bryan	Sindy Spackman	Mike Nassar & Butch Hartman	July 15, 2014	1.85
143	17	"Snack Attack"	Gary Conrad	Story by : Alec Schwimmer; Teleplay by : Ray DeLaurentis, Will Schifrin & Kevin Sullivan	Marcelo DeSouza	July 15, 2014	1.85
When Timmy inadvertently gets Jorgen fired from his job, he tries to help him get a new job. Mr. Crocker tries to get magic with Sparky's treats.
144	18	"Turning Into Turner"	Kevin Petrilak	Joanna Lewis, Alec Schwimmer & Kristine Songco	Jim Mortensen & Butch Hartman	July 16, 2014	1.91
144	18	"The Wand That Got Away"	Michelle Bryan	Sindy Spackman	Mike Milo & Butch Hartman	July 16, 2014	1.91
Mr. Crocker tries to transform into Timmy with his DNA replicator, the "Turner-Me-Into-Turner-Ator", but due to his mom spitting her DNA on a gum with Timmy's DNA due to one of her allergies, he transforms into a fusion of Timmy Turner and Mrs. Crocker. When he arrives at Timmy's house, Cosmo immediately mistakes him for Timmy from the "future", and Mr. Crocker pretends to be so, leaving Timmy to prevent himself from becoming a monster in a week. After a trip to the 70's with Timmy, Wanda and Poof, Cosmo loses his wand. In an homage to Scooby-Doo, Where Are You!, Timmy and his fairies try to find it or else he can no longer be a fairy godparent.
145	19	"Stage Fright"	Gary Conrad	Joanna Lewis, Kristine Songco & Becky Wangberg	Miguel Puga	July 22, 2014	1.56
145	19	"Gone Flushin'"	Kevin Petrilak	Lissa Kapstrom	Mike Nassar & Butch Hartman	July 22, 2014	1.56
Vicky uses Timmy to help her get into acting...with painful consequences for Timmy. Timmy, Cosmo, Wanda, and Poof (all in fish form) get flushed down the toilet, and must find their wands in the sewer to get back home. Meanwhile, Catman adopts a new superhero identity after ending up getting flushed as well.
146	20	"Fairly Old Parent"	Michelle Bryan & Gary Conrad	Ray DeLaurentis, Will Schifrin, Alec Schwimmer, Kevin Sullivan & Becky Wangberg	Marcelo DeSouza, Jim Mortensen & Butch Hartman	March 28, 2015 (Note: This episode first aired on November 20, 2014 in Germany and Austria.)	1.95
Poof becomes Mrs. Crocker's fairy godparent, but eventually gets tired after she constantly keeps making wishes. Guest star: Phil LaMarr as Denzel Washington and Announcer
147	21	"School of Crock"	Ken Bruce & Michelle Bryan	Ray DeLaurentis, Will Schifrin, Alec Schwimmer & Kevin Sullivan	Wolf-Rüdiger Bloss & Fred Gonzales	May 26, 2014	2.45
Crocker disguises himself as a Spellementary school teacher to steal magic from the kids and Poof begins to learn how to speak when he goes through "prooferty".
148	22	"Dimmsdale Tales"	Ken Bruce & Gary Conrad	Joanna Lewis, Alec Schwimmer, Kristine Songco & Sindy Spackman	Brandon Kruse & Miguel Puga	July 18, 2014	1.75
After Mr. Turner forgets the camping supplies for his scouts trip, Timmy tells scary stories to past the time.
149	23	"The Past and the Furious"	Michelle Bryan and Gary Conrad	Ray DeLaurentis, Will Schifrin, Alec Schwimmer & Kevin Sullivan	Wolf-Rüdiger Bloss, Marcelo DeSouza & Brandon Kruse	July 11, 2014	2.12
On Cosmo and Wanda's anniversary, they go to see their former godkids with Timmy. However, they alter the past and wind up losing their jobs as fairy godparents. Timmy and Sparky must fix the timeline or else they'll never see Cosmo and Wanda again.
150	24	"The Fairy Beginning"	Ken Bruce and Michelle Bryan	Ray DeLaurentis, Will Schifrin, Alec Schwimmer & Kevin Sullivan	Fred Gonzales, Brandon Kruse & Miguel Puga	March 28, 2015 (Note: This episode first aired on November 26, 2014 in Germany and Austria.)	2.03
Cosmo's reputation as a fairy godparent is at risk when he can't remember if he turned in one of his final tests.
151	25	"Fairly Odd Fairy Tales"	Ken Bruce & Gary Conrad	Whitney Fox, Joanna Lewis, Alec Schwimmer & Kristine Songco	Marcelo DeSouza & Brandon Kruse	August 1, 2014	2.14
After Poof refuses to fall asleep Wanda reads him fairy tales.
152	26	"Man's Worst Friend"	Michelle Bryan & Gary Conrad	Ray DeLaurentis, Will Schifrin, Alec Schwimmer & Kevin Sullivan	Wolf-Rüdiger Bloss & Fred Gonzales	February 8, 2015 (Note: This episode first aired on November 28, 2014 in Germany and Austria.)	1.48
Foop replaces Sparky with an Anti-Fairy dog called Anti-Sparky. Guest star: Paul Rugg as the Grim Reaper

== DVD releases ==
Season	Episodes	Release dates
Season	Episodes	Region 1
9	26	Season 9: November 26, 2024; Episodes: Entire season included The Complete Series: December 10, 2024; Episodes: Entire season included
