= The Fairly OddParents season 10 =

Season of television series

The Fairly OddParents
- Season 10
- DVD cover
- Showrunner: Butch Hartman
- No. of episodes: 20 (37 segments)

Release
- Original network: Nickelodeon (2016 episodes); Nicktoons (2017 episodes)
- Original release: January 15, 2016 – July 26, 2017

Season chronology
- ← Previous; Season 9

The tenth and final season of The Fairly OddParents had twenty episodes ordered on December 15, 2015, and premiered on January 15, 2016 and ended on July 26, 2017 on both Nickelodeon and Nicktoons.

== Production ==
Nickelodeon announced this season on August 18, 2015. A total of 20 episodes were ordered after the initial order of seven. It was originally 13. Starting with "Space Ca-Dad", the show's animation made a transition from traditional animation to Adobe Flash animation.

== Episodes ==
No. overall	No. in season	Title	Directed by	Written by	Storyboard by	Original release date	Prod. code	US viewers (millions)
Nickelodeon
153	1	"The Big Fairy Share Scare!"	Ken Bruce & John McIntyre	Ellen Byron, Ray DeLaurentis & Lissa Kapstrom	Fred Gonzales & Butch Hartman	January 15, 2016	FOP-407	1.20
153	1	"The Big Fairy Share Scare!"	Ken Bruce & John McIntyre	Ellen Byron, Ray DeLaurentis & Lissa Kapstrom	Fred Gonzales & Butch Hartman	January 15, 2016	FOP-408	1.20
Timmy is shocked when Jorgen informs him that he has to share his fairies with his new neighbor named Chloe Carmichael, due to overwhelming demand, fairies taking on better paying jobs in the fancy candle industry and fairy godparent shortage. Chaos soon ensues when Timmy tries to find a way not to share Cosmo and Wanda, and Chloe tries to use her magic for good by wishing everyone in Dimmsdale would share everything.
154	2	"Whittle Me This!"	John McIntyre	Ellen Byron, Bob Colleary, Ray DeLaurentis & Lissa Kapstrom	Sarah Johnson	January 22, 2016	FOP-410	1.23
154	2	"Mayor May Not"	Ken Bruce	Ellen Byron, Bob Colleary, Ray DeLaurentis & Lissa Kapstrom	Butch Hartman & Paul Lee	January 29, 2016	FOP-411	1.13
Chloe wishes that she and Timmy would go to Catman's party, but when they get there, Catman believes that Chloe is his sidekick Catgirl and that Timmy has been kidnapped by the Whittler, who in reality is Cosmo. When Timmy's father mopes about not being respected despite being rich, Timmy wishes that his father could be the Mayor of Dimmsdale, but soon he winds up being chased by the paparazzi and risks having his fairies discovered.
155	3	"Girly Squirrely"	Sherie Pollack	Ellen Byron, Bob Colleary, Ray DeLaurentis & Lissa Kapstrom	John West	February 5, 2016	FOP-412	1.30
155	3	"Birthday Battle"	Sherie Pollack	Ellen Byron, Bob Colleary, Ray DeLaurentis & Lissa Kapstrom	Gavin Freitas	February 19, 2016	FOP-409	1.22
Timmy goes a little crazy when he hears Chloe is joining the Squirrely Scouts, while a bear records something on a sheet when Timmy's father does something wrong. It's Timmy's birthday and he wants toys from his favorite franchise, the Transmorphers. When his godparents tell him that Chloe's birthday is on the same day as his, they fight over where the celebration should be taking place.
156	4	"The Fair Bears"	John McIntyre	Ellen Byron, Bob Colleary, Ray DeLaurentis & Lissa Kapstrom	Benji Williams	February 26, 2016	FOP-413	1.27
156	4	"Return of the L.O.S.E.R.S."	Ken Bruce	Ellen Byron, Bob Colleary, Ray DeLaurentis & Lissa Kapstrom	Gavin Freitas	June 14, 2017 (Nicktoons) (Note: This episode first aired on May 5, 2016 in Latin America.)	FOP-414	0.17
Chloe invites Timmy, Cosmo, and Wanda over to her house to watch the Fair Bears (spoof of Care Bears). Coming up with an idea, Chloe wishes that the Fair Bears gang were real, but trouble soon begins when Wanda and Timmy are brainwashed by the gang. When Cosmo and Wanda go shopping, Timmy's enemies learn that he is helpless without his fairies, and try to destroy him while he is weak, while Chloe has to deal with babysitting him. Note: This episode, along with "Goldie-Crocks and the Three Fair Bears / Fancy Schmancy" are the only episodes to never have aired on Nickelodeon.
157	5	"A Sash and a Rash"	Sherie Pollack	Ellen Byron, Bob Colleary, Ray DeLaurentis & Lissa Kapstrom	Sarah Johnson	September 12, 2016 (Note: This episode first aired on May 6, 2016 in Latin America.)	FOP-415	1.46
157	5	"Fish Out of Water"	John McIntyre	Ellen Byron, Bob Colleary, Ray DeLaurentis & Lissa Kapstrom	Butch Hartman & Paul Lee	September 12, 2016	FOP-416	N/A
Chloe thinks she has a stress-caused rash and wishes to be a slacker, but Dimmsdale falls apart without her. Timmy's dad wants to catch a giant fish to win a trophy. Chloe makes things more difficult when she wishes that the fish can fight back, resulting in the fish rebelling against humans.
158	6	"Animal Crockers"	Ken Bruce	Ellen Byron, Bob Colleary, Ray DeLaurentis & Lissa Kapstrom	Sarah Johnson	September 14, 2016 (Note: This episode first aired on August 17, 2016 in Israel.)	FOP-420	1.36
158	6	"One Flu Over the Crocker's Nest"	Ken Bruce	Ellen Byron, Bob Colleary, Ray DeLaurentis & Lissa Kapstrom	John West	September 14, 2016	FOP-417	1.36
Chloe wishes that an animal that looks oddly like Mr. Crocker would no longer be endangered. Timmy, Chloe and the fairies go inside Mr. Crocker to destroy the magical Fairy Flu germs Cosmo sneezed on him.
159	7	"Booby Trapped"	John McIntyre & Sherie Pollack	Ellen Byron, Bob Colleary, Ray DeLaurentis & Lissa Kapstrom	Gavin Freitas, Sarah Johnson & Benji Williams	September 16, 2016 (Note: This episode first aired on August 18, 2016 in Israel.)	FOP-418	1.60
159	7	"Booby Trapped"	John McIntyre & Sherie Pollack	Ellen Byron, Bob Colleary, Ray DeLaurentis & Lissa Kapstrom	Gavin Freitas, Sarah Johnson & Benji Williams	September 16, 2016	FOP-419	1.60
Cosmo and Wanda spend the night at Chloe's, disguised as flightless booby birds. But when Chloe's parents decide to return the boobies to their natural habitat in the rainforest, Timmy and Chloe have to go and save them. Note: This episode was the last to air on the main Nickelodeon channel. Starting with "Certifiable Super Sitter", all the episodes would instead premiere on the Nicktoons channel. Guest stars: Cheri Oteri as Connie Carmichael and Mick Wingert as Clark Carmichael
160	8	"Blue Angel"	John McIntyre	Bob Colleary & Ray DeLaurentis	John West	September 13, 2016 (Note: This episode first aired on August 21, 2016 in Israel.)	FOP-422	1.39
160	8	"Marked Man"	Sherie Pollack	Ellen Byron, Bob Colleary, Ray DeLaurentis, Lissa Kapstrom & Becky Wangberg	Butch Hartman & Paul Lee	September 13, 2016	FOP-421	1.39
Chloe's goodness is draining the Big Anti-Fairy Wand. Foop disguises himself as a girl to try and break Chloe. Timmy introduces Chloe to Mark Chang to prove that aliens exist, but when Chloe convinces Mark to reveal his true form to the world, he's put at the risk of being captured by government agents.
161	9	"Clark Laser"	Ken Bruce	Ray DeLaurentis	Benji Williams	September 15, 2016 (Note: This episode first aired on August 22, 2016 in Israel.)	FOP-423	1.55
161	9	"Married to the Mom"	Sherie Pollack	Ellen Byron & Lissa Kapstrom	Gavin Freitas	September 15, 2016	FOP-424	1.55
Timmy and Chloe save Dark Laser's beloved pet, Flipsie, and Dark Laser becomes bound to them as their body guard. Timmy and Chloe wish up a girlfriend for Mr. Crocker to get him off their backs.
Nicktoons
162	10	"Which Is Wish"	John McIntyre	Ellen Byron, Bob Colleary, Ray DeLaurentis & Lissa Kapstrom	Sarah Johnson	June 21, 2017 (Note: This episode first aired on August 23, 2016 in Israel.); April 2, 2018 (Nickelodeon)	FOP-425	0.22
162	10	"Nuts and Dangerous"	Ken Bruce	Bob Colleary, Ray DeLaurentis & Lissa Kapstrom	Butch Hartman and Paul Lee	February 22, 2017; April 2, 2018 (Nickelodeon)	FOP-426	N/A
Timmy wishes that he and Chloe would switch places, but when Cosmo loses the wands, they risk being stuck as each other forever. Guest stars: Cheri Oteri as Connie Carmicheal and Mick Wingert as Clark Carmichael Timmy and his Dad enter a film festival for some father-son bonding, but things get out-of-hand when Dad casts Catman.
163	11	"Fairy Con"	John McIntyre	Ellen Byron, Bob Colleary & Ray DeLaurentis	Benji Williams	June 28, 2017 (Note: This episode first aired on November 3, 2016 in Germany.); April 2, 2018 (Nickelodeon)	FOP-428	0.23
163	11	"The Hungry Games"	Sherie Pollack	Becky Wangberg	John West	July 12, 2017 (Note: This episode first aired on November 3, 2016 in Austria.); April 2, 2018 (Nickelodeon)	FOP-427	0.26
Mr. Crocker creates wonky Cosmo and Wanda clones, so he can go on a fairy convention to steal the magic of all the fairies. Guest star: Mark Moseley as Security Guard #2 Timmy wishes that Chloe could have a chance to live out her favorite dystopian movie, but he quickly regrets it when everyone is hungry.
164	12	"Spring Break-Up"	Ken Bruce	Ellen Byron, Bob Colleary, Ray DeLaurentis & Lissa Kapstrom	Gavin Freitas	February 1, 2017 (Note: This episode first aired on November 7, 2016 in Germany.); April 3, 2018 (Nickelodeon)	FOP-429	0.21
164	12	"Dimmsdale Daze"	Sherie Pollack	Ellen Byron, Bob Colleary, Ray DeLaurentis & Lissa Kapstrom	Sarah Johnson	June 21, 2017 (Note: This episode first aired on November 8, 2016 in Germany.); April 3, 2018 (Nickelodeon)	FOP-430	0.22
Chloe wishes that her and Timmy's parents would go camping together, but it ends up causing a feud between the families. Guest stars: Cheri Oteri as Connie Carmichael and Mick Wingert as Clark Carmichael Chloe wishes that she would be a mother, so she can go to Dimmsdale Daze Carnival with Timmy. Guest stars: Cheri Oteri as Connie Carmichael and Mick Wingert as Clark Carmichael
165	13	"Cat 'n Mouse"	Ken Bruce	Ellen Byron, Bob Colleary, Ray DeLaurentis & Lissa Kapstrom	Sarah Johnson & Paul Lee	February 22, 2017 (Note: This episode first aired on November 9, 2016 in Germany.); April 3, 2018 (Nickelodeon)	FOP-431	N/A
165	13	"Chip Off the Old Crock!"	Sherie Pollack	Ellen Byron, Bob Colleary, Ray DeLaurentis & Lissa Kapstrom	John West	June 28, 2017 (Note: This episode first aired on November 10, 2016 in Germany.); April 3, 2018 (Nickelodeon)	FOP-432	0.23
Timmy and Chloe help the depressed Catman to prove to his girlfriend that he is a real superhero. Mr. Crocker teaches his nephew, Kevin Crocker, how to become a Fairy Hunter. Note: This is the final episode of the series to be animated with digital ink-and-paint. From the next episode onward, the series is animated entirely in Adobe Flash.
166	14	"Space Ca-Dad"	George Elliott & Keith Oliver	Ellen Byron, Bob Colleary, Ray DeLaurentis & Lissa Kapstrom	Steve Daye	July 19, 2017 (Note: This episode first aired on December 10, 2016 in Austria.); April 4, 2018 (Nickelodeon)	FOP-433	0.28
166	14	"Summer Bummer"	George Elliott & Keith Oliver	Ellen Byron, Bob Colleary, Ray DeLaurentis & Lissa Kapstrom	Ted Collyer	July 12, 2017 (Note: This episode first aired on December 10, 2016 in Austria.); April 4, 2018 (Nickelodeon)	FOP-434	0.26
The Squirrely Scouts go into space to plant a flag on unfamiliar terrain, hoping to achieve a special Squirrely Scout status. Note: This is the first episode of the series to be animated entirely in Adobe Flash. Chloe spends the summer vacation studying, but her inner child disagrees and causes her to make crazy wishes in her sleep.
167	15	"Hare Raiser"	George Elliott & Keith Oliver	Ellen Byron, Bob Colleary, Ray DeLaurentis & Lissa Kapstrom	Blayne Burnside & Brian Coughlan	July 26, 2017 (Note: This episode first aired on December 10, 2016 in Austria.); April 4, 2018 (Nickelodeon)	FOP-435	0.38
167	15	"The Kale Patch Caper"	George Elliott & Keith Oliver	Ellen Byron, Bob Colleary, Ray DeLaurentis, Lissa Kapstrom & Becky Wangberg	Steve Daye	July 26, 2017; April 4, 2018 (Nickelodeon)	FOP-437	0.38
Despite Timmy's warnings, Chloe wants to free the supposedly dangerous class hare. When Timmy's Dad buys the last Kale Patch Kid Chloe needs to complete her collection, she considers stealing it. Note: This episode was the last installment of The Fairly OddParents to air, but wasn't the last to be produced.
168	16	"Dadlantis"	George Elliott & Keith Oliver	Ellen Byron, Bob Colleary, Ray DeLaurentis & Lissa Kapstrom	Blayne Burnside, Brian Wong & Gerry Duchemin	February 8, 2017 (Note: This episode first aired on December 10, 2016 in Austria.); April 5, 2018 (Nickelodeon)	FOP-436	N/A
168	16	"Chloe Rules!"	George Elliott & Keith Oliver	Ellen Byron, Bob Colleary, Ray DeLaurentis & Lissa Kapstrom	Steve Remen	February 15, 2017 (Note: This episode first aired on December 10, 2016 in Austria.); April 5, 2018 (Nickelodeon)	FOP-438	0.14
Timmy and Chloe become mermaid eco-warriors and save the Underwater City of Atlantis from a dangerous sea monster. Chloe becomes the hall monitor at school and takes the job a little too seriously.
169	17	"Crockin' the House" "Crockin' the Town"	George Elliott & Keith Oliver	Ellen Byron, Bob Colleary, Ray DeLaurentis & Lissa Kapstrom	Ted Collyer	January 25, 2017 (Note: This episode first aired on December 26, 2016 in Germany.); April 5, 2018 (Nickelodeon)	FOP-439	0.17
169	17	"Tardy Sauce"	George Elliott & Keith Oliver	Ellen Byron, Bob Colleary, Ray DeLaurentis & Lissa Kapstrom	Brian Coughlan	February 15, 2017 (Note: This episode first aired on December 27, 2016 in Germany.); April 5, 2018 (Nickelodeon)	FOP-440	0.14
Dolores-Day Crocker leaves her son home alone for the first time, and he asks Timmy to help him learn to have fun. Chloe wants to break the attendance record, but Timmy tells her school is canceled and drags her to a taco stand.
170	18	"Knitwits"	George Elliott & Keith Oliver	Ellen Byron, Bob Colleary, Ray DeLaurentis & Lissa Kapstrom	Gerry Duchemin	February 8, 2017; April 6, 2018 (Nickelodeon)	FOP-441	N/A
170	18	"Dimmsdale's Got Talent?"	George Elliott & Keith Oliver	Ellen Byron, Bob Colleary, Ray DeLaurentis, Lissa Kapstrom & Becky Wangberg	Steve Daye & Seema Virdi	June 17, 2017; April 6, 2018 (Nickelodeon)	FOP-442	N/A
Mr. and Mrs. Turner want to renew their marriage vows on a "knight adventure" cruise, but they end up on a knitters cruise instead. Mr. Bickles hosts a talent show, and everyone gets in but Timmy lacks any talent.
171	19	"Certifiable Super Sitter"	George Elliott & Keith Oliver	Story by : Kiley Vorndran; Teleplay by : Ellen Byron, Bob Colleary, Ray DeLaurentis & Lissa Kapstrom	Simon Paquette & Ted Collyer	January 18, 2017; April 6, 2018 (Nickelodeon)	FOP-443	0.23
171	19	"Certifiable Super Sitter"	George Elliott & Keith Oliver	Story by : Kiley Vorndran; Teleplay by : Ellen Byron, Bob Colleary, Ray DeLaurentis & Lissa Kapstrom	Simon Paquette & Ted Collyer	January 18, 2017; April 6, 2018 (Nickelodeon)	FOP-444	0.23
Chloe meets Poof for the first time when he comes home from school on Spring Break. Cosmo and Wanda win a free French dinner, so Chloe gets to babysit Poof and his friends. All goes well until Vicky arrives. Note: This is the final 22-minute special of the series. This is also the first to premiere on the Nicktoons channel and the first episode overall to premiere in 2017. This was the final episode to air on Nickelodeon.
172	20	"Goldie-Crocks and the Three Fair Bears"	George Elliott & Keith Oliver	Ray DeLaurentis & Will Schifrin	Katie Shanahan	July 19, 2017 (Note: This episode first aired on February 21, 2017 in Germany.)	FOP-446	0.28
172	20	"Fancy Schmancy"	George Elliott & Keith Oliver	Becky Wangberg	Brian Coughlan	February 1, 2017	FOP-445	0.21
Yet another Squirrely Scout camping trip goes bad when Mr. Crocker and the Fair Bears show up. Note: This episode, along with "Fancy Schmancy" and "Return of the L.O.S.E.R.S." are the only episodes to never have aired on Nickelodeon. Timmy's dad and Chloe's parents don't allow the children to celebrate their Friends' Day together, due to social differences. Note 1: This episode was the last to be completed, but wasn't the last one to air. Note 2: This episode, along with "Goldie-Crocks and the Three Fair Bears" and "Return of the L.O.S.E.R.S." are the only episodes to never have aired on Nickelodeon. Guest stars: Cheri Oteri as Connie Carmichael and Mick Wingert as Clark Carmichael

== DVD releases ==
Season	Episodes	Release dates
Season	Episodes	Region 1
10	20	Season 10: November 26, 2024 Episodes: Entire season included The Complete Series: December 10, 2024 Episodes: Entire season included

== Ratings ==
No.	Title	Original air date	Viewership (millions) (Live+SD)	Rating/share (18–49) (Live+SD)	Rank per week on Cable
1	"The Big Fairy Share Scare!"	January 15, 2016	1.20	0.22/1.8	#31
2a	"Whittle Me This!"	January 22, 2016	1.23	0.25/2.0	#35
2b	"Mayor May Not"	January 29, 2016	1.13	TBD	TBD
3a	"Girly Squirrely"	February 5, 2016	1.30	TBD	TBD
3b	"Birthday Battle"	February 19, 2016	1.22	TBD	TBD
4a	"The Fair Bears"	February 26, 2016	1.27	TBD	TBD
5a	"A Sash and a Rash"	September 12, 2016	TBD	TBD	TBD
5b	"Fish Out of Water"	September 12, 2016	TBD	TBD	TBD
