= Tuck Tucker =

American animator (1961–2020)

- Born: William Osborne Tucker III; August 20, 1961; Lynchburg, Virginia, U.S.
- Died: December 22, 2020 (aged 59); Lynchburg, Virginia, U.S.
- Other name: Billy Bob Tucker
- Occupations: Writer; storyboard artist; animator; director; songwriter
- Years active: 1987–2020
- Known for: Hey Arnold! SpongeBob SquarePants
- Spouse: Connie Tucker (m. 1990; died 2015)
- Children: 1

William Osborne "Tuck" Tucker III (August 20, 1961 – December 22, 2020) was an American writer, storyboard artist, animator, songwriter, and director who worked on Hey Arnold! and SpongeBob SquarePants. He directed Hey Arnold!: The Movie in 2002.

== Early life and education ==
Tucker was born in Lynchburg, Virginia. He attended Virginia Episcopal School and Virginia Commonwealth University. He would spend most of his time at home watching cartoons with his father and cites these experiences as being very special to him. He married Connie Dyste in 1990 and had one daughter, Gina Tucker. The family resided in La Cañada Flintridge. Connie Tucker died of a rare cancer in 2015 and Tucker moved home to Virginia to teach art to students at Longwood University.

== Career ==
While in animation class, his instructor moved him to Los Angeles after graduation for work at Disney to work on films like The Little Mermaid as his first animation job. Afterwards, he left to work on shows like The Simpsons from Fox, and then going to Nickelodeon while switching from storyboard work on Rugrats and Aaahh!!! Real Monsters to directing on Hey Arnold!. After that, he moved on to SpongeBob SquarePants. He went from being a storyboard artist on The SpongeBob SquarePants Movie to being a writer and storyboard director, and then a supervising storyboard director. During his time on SpongeBob, he won the 38th Annual Annie Award in 2011 for Best Music in a Television Production alongside Jeremy Wakefield, Sage Guyton, and Nick Carr. Afterwards, he went to direct on The Fairly OddParents during its ninth season. In January 2015, Tucker began teaching graphic and animation design at Longwood University in Farmville, Virginia.

== Death ==
Tucker died in Lynchburg on December 22, 2020, at age 59. His cause of death was not publicly disclosed.

== Filmography ==
=== Film ===
Year	Title	Notes
1987	Pinocchio and the Emperor of the Night	Animation Breakdown Artist
1988	BraveStarr: The Movie	Assistant Animator
1989	The Little Mermaid	Breakdown/In between Artist
1990	Flower Planet	Concept Developer & Animator
1996	Arnold	Layout Artist, Storyboard Artist, & Supervising Director
1999	Curbside	Storyboard Artist
2002	Hey Arnold!: The Movie	Director
2003	Looney Tunes: Back in Action	Animator
2004	Party Wagon	Character Designer, Prop Designer, Additional Sheet Timer, Storyboard Artist, & Director
2004	Hare and Loathing in Las Vegas	Storyboard Artist
2004	The Jimmy Timmy Power Hour	Creative Consultant
2004	The SpongeBob SquarePants Movie	Production Storyboard Artist
2006	The Jimmy Timmy Power Hour 2: When Nerds Collide!	Creative Consultant
2006	The Jimmy Timmy Power Hour 3: The Jerkinators!	Creative Consultant
2022	The Bob's Burgers Movie	Storyboard revisionist (posthumous release)

=== Television ===
Year	Title	Notes
1987–1988	BraveStarr	Assistant Animator
1988–1989	ALF Tales	Storyboard Clean-Up (Season 1)
1988–1989	ALF: The Animated Series	Storyboard Clean-Up (Season 2)
1990–1993; 1995	The Simpsons	Character Layout Artist (1990–1993); Storyboard Artist ("Dancin' Homer"); Animation Timer ("Principal Charming"); Background Layout Artist ("A Star Is Burns")
1991; 1994–1995	Rugrats	Character Layout Artist ("Tommy's First Birthday," "Barbecue Story/Waiter, There's a Baby in My Soup," and "Baby Commercial/Little Dude"); Storyboard Artist (1994–1995); Assistant Director (1994)
1992–1993	The Ren and Stimpy Show	Layout Artist
1993	2 Stupid Dogs	Storyboard Artist
1994–1995	Aaahh!!! Real Monsters	Storyboard Artist
1994–1996	Duckman	Storyboard Artist
1996–2004	Hey Arnold!	Creative Director; Supervising Director (1999–2004); Storyboard Director (1996–1999); Storyboard Artist ("24 Hours to Live"); Storyboard Supervisor ("The Journal"); Sheet Timer (1997); Director (1996–1998; 2001)
1997	What a Cartoon!	Layout Artist ("Tales of Worm Paranoia")
1998	Oh Yeah! Cartoons	Storyboard Artist ("Planet Kate")
2002–2006	The Adventures of Jimmy Neutron: Boy Genius	Creative Consultant; Storyboard Artist (2003)
2005	Camp Lazlo	Writer & Storyboard Artist
2005–2006	Family Guy	Storyboard Artist ("PTV"); Assistant Director ("Stewie Griffin: The Untold Story")
2005–2006	Drawn Together	Director
2006–2014	SpongeBob SquarePants	Writer & Storyboard Director (2006–2007); Supervising Storyboard Director (2007–2014); Songwriter ("The Inmates of Summer" and "Pest of the West"); Special Thanks ("Truth or Square")
2006	Squirrel Boy	Storyboard Artist
2008	The Mighty B!	Storyboard Revisionist
2013–2014	The Fairly OddParents	Director (Season 9)
2013–2014	Clarence	Sheet Timer ("Pretty Great Day with a Girl"); Storyboard Supervisor; Storyboard Revision Supervisor ("Belson's Sleepover")
2015	All Hail King Julien	Storyboard Artist ("The Really Really Big Lie")
